= Trans-Nzoia District =

Former district in Kenya

Coordinates: 1.1°N 34.95°E

The Trans-Nzoia District was an administrative district of Rift Valley Province, Kenya, located between the Nzoia River and Mount Elgon with its centre at the town of Kitale.

The district origin go back when the region was transferred from Uganda in 1902. The area remained unclassified, but considered part of Kisumu Province, until 1905 or 1906 when it was admitted to the Naivasha Province as Uasin Gishu District. It contained Trans-Nzoia and later in 1912, when Elgeyo joined, and Marakwet in 1917. In 1919, the colonial authorities split Trans Nzoia from Uasin Gishu District, where two years later, it became an extra-provincial territory. In 1929, Trans-Nzoia and Uasin Gishu districts formed Nzoia Province, only for the province to be absorbed into the Rift Valley Province. The two districts will be joined again in 1945, then settled, were split up sometime later in 1949. Trans-Nzoia was maintained during review of district boundaries in 1962. It became one of the forty districts of Kenya, 1963.

It had an estimated population of 575,662 in 1999.

By the 2000s, Trans Nzoia District had ceased to exist as it had split into Kwanza, Trans Nzoia East and Trans Nzoia West districts. The three districts had a total population of 818,757, with a predominantly rural population across the districts.

In 2010, after the promulgation of the new constitution of Kenya, counties were to be created based on the districts of Kenya that existed as at 1992. This effectively led to the creation of Trans-Nzoia County.

Historically the area had been inhabited by the Kalenjin people. After independence many of the farms vacated by white settlers were bought by individuals from other ethnic groups in Kenya.

The district had three constituencies:

- Cherangani Constituency
- Kwanza Constituency
- Saboti Constituency

Local authorities (councils)
Authority	Type	Population*	Urban pop.*
Kitale	Municipality	86,055	63,245
Nzoia	County	489,607	0
Total	-	575,662	63,245
* 1999 census. Source:

Administrative divisions
Division	Population*	Urban pop.*	Headquarters
Central	147,992	42,884	Kitale
Cherangany	52,974	0	Cherangani
Endebess	61,481	0	Endebess
Kaplamai	89,858	0	
Kiminini	64,685	0	Kiminini
Kwanza	88,727	0	Kwanza
Saboti	69,945	0	Saboti
Total	575,662	42,884	-
* 1999 census. Sources: , ,
