= Suam =

Suam may refer to:

- Suam, Uganda, a town in the Eastern Region of Uganda
- Suam, Kenya, a town in Trans-Nzoia County, Kenya
- Suam River, a river that separates the two towns and forms the international border between Uganda and Kenya
- Suam Market, a street market in Nam-gu, Ulsan, South Korea
- Suam, Scotland, an island in the Outer Hebrides

== Other uses ==
- Suam language - a language spoken in Papua New Guinea
