= Kipruto Rono Arap Kirwa =

Kenyan politician (born 1957)

Honorable Christopher Kipruto Rono Kirwa

IGAD Special Envoy to Somalia
- In office 2008–2012

15th Minister of Agriculture
- In office 4 January 2003 – 17th April 2008
- President: Mwai Kibaki
- Preceded by: Bonaya Godana
- Succeeded by: William Ruto

Member of Parliament from Cherangany Constituency
- In office 1990–2008
- President: Mwai Kibaki
- Preceded by: John Kirwa Rotich
- Succeeded by: Joshua Serem Kutuny

Personal details
- Born: 18 September 1957 (age 68) Tanganyika (presently Tanzania)
- Party: DAP–K (since 2022)
- Children: 4
- Education: The Management University of Africa (Msc); University of Nairobi (MA)
- Occupation: Politician and farmer
- Known for: Defeating Masinde Muliro and for being the Minister for Agriculture during the Kibaki administration

Kipruto Rono Arap Kirwa (born 1957) is a Kenyan politician who served as the 15th Minister of Agriculture between 2003 and 2008 in the Kibaki administration. He previously served as Member of Parliament for Cherangany Constituency between 1990 and 2002.

== Early life and education ==
Kirwa was born in Tanganyika, currently Republic of Tanzania. His father, Kiprono Cheptile Arap Sirng'ewo was a farmer and livestock keeper, who was among the Nandi people evicted from their fertile ancestral lands by the British colonialists in Nandi County to pave the way for white settlers to develop the area that became the white Highlands in the Rift Valley. The late colonial senior chief Elijah Cheruiyot oversaw the issuing of the temporary British permit that allowed the families to enter the northern Tanganyika, settling in Mara, Musoma, Bunda and Mwanza in 1951.

His father begrudgingly settled there though he did not plan to live there for long. According to his parents, life had moved from bad to worse in their new unproductive foreign home. After Kenya attained its independence, they moved back to Kenya around mid-1960s, settling in Cherangany, Trans Nzoia County. Kirwa started his elementary education and later secondary education in Kenya, and he excelled culminating in his admission to the Egerton University where he acquired his tertiary education.

He holds two master's degrees; Master of Science in Applied Management and Leadership from The Management University of Africa, and Master of Arts in International Studies from the University of Nairobi. He is also pursuing further studies at the University of Nairobi which will lead to PhD in International Studies.

== Political career ==
=== Parliament ===
He was elected to represent the Cherangany Constituency in the national assembly of Kenya at the age of 33 during the 1990 by-election. He was re-elected consecutively during the 1992, 1997 and 2002 Kenyan general elections. He served as a member of parliament at the National Assembly of Kenya for approximately two decades.

=== Cabinet ===
When the NARC led by President Mwai Kibaki swept into power during the 2002 Kenyan general election, Kirwa was appointed to serve as the Minister for Agriculture. Later he was nominated to serve as IGAD Special Envoy to Somalia Peace and National Reconciliation from 2008 to 2012.

== Personal life ==
Kirwa is married with four children.
