= GMCA =

GMCA may refer to:

- German Mosquito Control Association, Speyer, Germany
- Government Medical College, Amritsar, a medical college in Punjab, India
- Grantham and Melton Cricket Association, England
- Greater Manchester Combined Authority, England — local government
