= Wafula =

Wafula is a male forename and a surname of African origin. In the Abaluhya tribe of Kenya, the name means a boy born during the rainy season. The female equivalent is Nafula.

== Persons with the given name ==
- Wafula Chebukati (1961–2025), Kenyan politician
- Wafula Oguttu (born 1952), Ugandan journalist and politician
- Wafula Wabuge (1927–1996), Kenyan politician
- Wafula Wamunyinyi, Kenyan politician

== Persons with the surname ==
- Anne Wafula Strike (born 1969), Kenyan-born British Paralympic wheelchair racer
- Azziad Nasenya Wafula (born 2000), Kenyan actress, content creator, radio host and social media personality
- Heristone Wafula (born 2003), Kenyan racewalker
- Innocent Wafula (born 1998), Ugandan footballer
- Jonathan Wafula (born 1994), Kenyan footballer
- Noah Wafula (born 1990), Kenyan footballer
- Stellah Wafula (born 1998), Kenyan rugby sevens player

== See also ==
- Waiola Church
