= Kwanza, Kenya =

Kwanza
- Town
- Location in Kenya
- Coordinates: 01°09′51″N 35°00′00″E
- Country: Kenya
- County: Trans-Nzoia County
- Constituencies of Kenya: Kwanza Constituency
- Town: 1988
- Elevation: 1,984 m (6,509 ft)
- Time zone: UTC+3 (EAT)

Kwanza is a town in Trans-Nzoia County in western Kenya, close to the international border with Uganda. It is the headquarters of Kwanza Ward, one of the constituent wards in Kwanza Constituency. Kwanza has tarmarked road(kitale-kolongolo)

== Location ==
Kwanza is located approximately 20 kilometres (12 mi), by road, north of Kitale, the location of the county headquarters. This is about 37 kilometres (23 mi), by road, east of the Suam, Kenya customs control post, at the border with Uganda. The geographical coordinates of Kwanza are: 01°09'51.0"N, 35°00'00.0"E (Latitude:1.1641; Longitude:35.0000). Kwanza sits at an average elevation of 1,984 metres (6,509 ft), above sea level.

== Overview ==
As of June 2018, Kwanza Constituency lacked a tarmacked road, with residents using donkeys to "transport produce from farms to markets". The planned tarmacking of the Kitale–Namanjalala–Keriget–Chepchoina Road, is expected to boost agriculture in the community, as it will ease the transport of agricultural produce to the market, post-harvest. The 60 kilometres (37 mi) road, is expected to cost US$20 million to upgrade to grade II tarmac, with drainage culverts and shoulders. The contract has been awarded to China National Aero-Technology International Engineering Corporation, with the government of Kenya funding the upgrade.
