= Suam–Endebess–Kitale–Eldoret Road =

Rural road in Kenya

Coordinates: 01°04′27″N 34°51′23″E

Route information
- Length: 48 mi (77 km)
- History: Designated in 2018; Completed in 2021 (Expected)

Major junctions
- Northwest end: Suam
- Endebess; Kitale
- Southeast end: Eldoret

Location
- Country: Kenya

Highway system
- Transport in Kenya

The Suam–Endebess–Kitale–Eldoret Road, is a rural road in Kenya. The road links Suam, in Trans-Nzoia County, to the towns of Endebess, Kitale, and Eldoret in Uasin Gishu County.

== Location ==
The road starts at Suam, at the international border with Uganda and proceeds in a southeasterly direction, through Endebess, to end at Kitale, a total distance of about 45 kilometres (28 mi). The work includes building a bypass around the city of Eldoret, and the dualing of the road section between Kitale and Matisi.

== Overview ==
This road, together with the Ugandan road that connects to it, the Kapchorwa–Suam Road, form an important transport corridor between the two countries, sometimes referred to as the Kapchorwa–Suam–Endebess–Kitale–Eldoret Road Corridor. Both people and goods move along this corridor, with Ugandans buying fuel, fertilizer, and maize seeds from Kenya and Kenyans buying bananas, sugar, electric power and rental accommodation from Uganda.

== Updating to bitumen surface ==
The governments of Kenya and Uganda though the Kenya National Highways Authority and the Uganda National Roads Authority are seeking funds from the African Development Bank to improve the road along with the Kapchorwa–Suam Road on the Ugandan side, to grade II bituminous surface with shoulders and culverts. Some parts of this road are already tarmacked. However a new bypass around the town of Eldoret is part of the planned upgrade. The contract distance on this road is 76 kilometres (47 mi).

In August 2018, William Ruto, the deputy president of Kenya, and Yoweri Museveni, the president of Uganda, officially jointly kick-started the rehabilitation and improvement of this road, and the contiguous Kapchorwa–Suam Road. The projected cost estimate is US$147.3 million, financed by loans from the African Development Bank (AfDB) and African Development Fund (AfDF) and counterpart funding by the Government of Kenya. The improvement to the 77 kilometres (48 mi) road, is expected to last 30 months. As of March 2024, construction was still ongoing.

== See also ==
- List of roads in Kenya
- Kakira–Kisumu Expressway
