= Suam, Kenya =

- Location in Kenya
- Coordinates: 01°12′57″N 34°44′03″E
- Country: Kenya
- County: Trans-Nzoia County

Suam, Kenya is a settlement in the Trans-Nzoia County of Kenya. It sits across the Suam River from Suam, Uganda, at the international border between the two countries.

== Location ==
The settlement lies 44 kilometres (27 mi), by road, northwest of Kitale, where the county headquarters are located. Suam is located approximately 117 kilometres (73 mi), by road, northwest of Eldoret, the nearest large city. This location lies approximately 437 kilometres (272 mi), by road, northwest of Nairobi, the capital of Kenya and the largest city in that country. The coordinates of Suam, Kenya are:1°12'57.0"N, 34°44'03.0"E (Latitude:1.215825; Longitude:34.734172).

== Overview ==
In 2013, the Trans-Nzoia County government received a 100 acres (40 ha) parcel of land at the Kenya-Uganda border, from the Kenya Forest Service, for the purpose of building the town of Suam, Kenya, across the Suam River from the already established town of Suam, Uganda.

In 2014, the governments of Kenya and Uganda began joint efforts to source funds from the African Development Bank for the purpose of tarmacking to grade II bitumen surface, the Kapchorwa–Suam Road in Uganda and the Suam–Endebess–Kitale–Eldoret Road on the Kenya side. It is expected that the road improvement will spur trade between the two countries. In August 2017, The EastAfrican reported that Kenya and Uganda were jointly developing a one-stop-border-crossing (OSBC) at Suam, similar to the crossings at Busia and Malaba.

== See also ==
- Mount Elgon National Park
- Mount Elgon
