= Endebess Constituency =

Constituency in Trans-Nzoia County, Kenya

Endebess
- constituency for the Parliament of Kenya
- Endebess Constituency within Trans Nzoia County

- Trans Nzoia County within Kenya
- County: Trans Nzoia
- Population: 111,782
- Area: 678 km^{2} (261.8 sq mi)

Current constituency
- Number of members: 1
- Party: UDA
- Member of Parliament: Robert Pukose
- Wards: 3

Endebess is a constituency in Kenya. It is one of five constituencies in Trans-Nzoia County. It was established/created for the 2013 general election, and it was carved out of the larger Kwanza constituency. Robert Pukose was elected as its inaugural member of parliament, and was re-elected for the subsequent terms in the 2017 Kenyan general election and the 2022 Kenyan general election .

== Members of Parliament ==
Elections	MP	Party	Notes
2013	Robert Pukose	URP	This was the first election held under the new constitution of Kenya (2010). Uhuru Kenyatta was elected as the fourth president of the Republic of Kenya. Endebess constituency was curved out of the larger Kwanza Constituency, Pukose defeated his closest rival, Joseph Mtoto.
2017	Robert Pukose	JP	
2022	Robert Pukose	UDA	William Ruto was elected as the fifth president of the Republic of Kenya on this general election.

== County Assembly Wards ==
Ward	Registered Voter's
Chepchoina	15,679
Endebess	13,846
Matumbei	13,664
Total	43,189
*September 2022
