= Kwanza (disambiguation) =

Kwanza is the currency of Angola.

Kwanza or Kwanzaa may refer to:

- Cuanza River
- Kwanzaa, an annual late December holiday week
- Kwanza (The First), album
- Kwanza (album) by Archie Shepp
- Kwanza, Angola
- Kwanza, Kenya
