= Joshua Kutuny =

Kenyan politician (born 1978)

Hon Joshua Serem Kutuny

Member of Parliament from Cherangany Constituency
- In office 2017–2022
- Preceded by: Wesley Kipchumba Korir
- Succeeded by: Patrick Barasa Simiyu

Parliament of Kenya

Personal details
- Born: 1978 (age 47–48) Mwaita, Kenya
- Citizenship: Kenya
- Party: ODM (Before 2012); URP (2012–2016); JP (2016–Present)
- Children: 4
- Education: Moi University; Bachelor of Arts (Political Science and Public Administration)
- Occupation: Politician and administrator
- Known for: Defeating Kipruto Arap Kirwa during the 2007 Kenyan general election.

Joshua Serem Kutuny (born 1978) is a Kenyan politician who has been a member of the National Assembly of Kenya for Cherangany Constituency. He belonged to the Orange Democratic Movement from 2007 before he defected to the United Republican Party prior to the 2013 general election, and finally to the Jubilee Party from 2017.

== Early life and education ==
Kutuny undertook his secondary education at Kipkeikei High School, where he passed his examination well and was admitted to the Egerton University under the government scholarship to pursue a degree course in the Bachelor of Science (Agriculture), though he didn't graduate as this was not what he intended to pursue. He later joined Moi University where he pursued a Bachelor of Arts (Political Science and Public Administration), graduating the year 2007. He is currently pursuing further studies which will lead into a Masters of Arts in International Relations.

== Political career ==
He was elected to represent the Cherangany Constituency in the National Assembly of Kenya during the 2007 Kenyan parliamentary election. He lost his parliamentary seat in the 2013 Kenyan general election to the 2012 Boston Marathon winner Wesley Korir.

Thereafter, he was appointed by the President of Kenya Uhuru Muigai Kenyatta as his political advisor, a post he held until December 2017, when he tendered his resignation and declared his candidature for the Cherangany Constituency parliamentary seat. He won the seat with a slim margin during the 2017 Kenyan general election.

He was appointed as an acting Deputy Secretary-General of the ruling JP early 2021; following the ousting of Hon Caleb Kositany from the office, a diehard stalwart of the Deputy President Ruto. This was after President of Kenya Uhuru Muigai Kenyatta ditched long term buddy William Samoei Ruto and turned to Raila Amolo Odinga.

During the 2022 Kenyan general election, he lost his parliamentary seat to the newcomer Patrick Barasa Simiyu of DAP – K under the Azimio la Umoja–One Kenya Coalition Party.

== Personal life ==
Hon Kutuny is married with four children including rockyfn
