= Mabati Tatu =

Mabati Tatu is a fast growing shopping center close to the border of Bungoma County and Trans-Nzoia County in Kenya. It is located 28 kilometres (17 mi) from Kitale town along the Kiminini – Turbo road. The name 'Mabati Tatu' is a direct translation of Swahili for three iron sheets. This name is in reference to the family of Mzee Patrick Wamalwa Ngome who was the first to settle at the then bushy dirt road intersection.

In 1992, Mzee Patrick Ngome relocated his family from the neighboring Uasin Gishu District (now Uasin Gishu County) following a spate of tribal clashes between the Kalenjin and Luhya communities living in the district.
