= Luna Kamau =

Kenyan scientist

- Born: Kitale, Trans-Nzoia County, Kenya
- Citizenship: Kenyan
- Education: Kenyatta University (BEd, MSc, PhD)
- Occupation: Public health scientist
- Employer: Kenya Medical Research Institute
- Known for: Malaria management research
- Title: Chief Research Officer; Deputy Director, Centre for Biotechnology Research and Development
- Awards: Fellow of The World Academy of Sciences (2018); Fellow of the African Academy of Sciences (2021); PAMCA Merit Award (2019)

Luna Kamau is a Kenyan public health scientist who works in malaria management. An executive at the Kenya Medical Research Institute's Centre for Biotechnology Research and Development, she is a 2018 Fellow of The World Academy of Sciences and 2021 Fellow of the African Academy of Sciences.

== Biography ==
Kamau was born in Kitale, Trans-Nzoia County. She studied at Kenyatta University, where she obtained her bachelor of education degree in science in 1991, her Master of Science degree in immunology in 1995, and her doctor of philosophy degree in molecular entomology in 1998, the last one of which was under a Centers for Disease Control and Prevention/World Health Organization joint fellowship.

Kamau joined the Kenya Medical Research Institute (KEMRI), where she has worked as senior principal scientist and deputy director for the Centre for Biotechnology Research and Development; she was promoted to chief research officer in 2019. She served at TWAS as a Young Affiliate from 2008 to 2012. Kamau said that as a woman scientist she had "to become resilient [and] face environments that were not gender sensitive" amidst gender inequality in Africa.

Kamau studies molecular entomology, molecular vector biology, and ecology as a scientist. Her research includes work for global implementation of mosquito net policy and indoor insecticide spraying. In 2006, she received a Swedish International Development Cooperation Agency grant to study mosquito transmission of malaria.

In 2018, Kamau was elected a Fellow of The World Academy of Sciences and a member of the Kenya National Academy of Sciences. She received the 2019 PAMCA Merit Award for Significant Contribution in Capacity Building and Research Support in Africa. She was elected Fellow of the African Academy of Sciences in 2021. KEMRI also awarded her their Gold (Nelion) Excellence/Merit Award in 2015 and Global Research Excellence Award in 2020.
