= Norbert Becker =

Norbert Becker may refer to:

- Norbert Becker (agroscientist) (1937–2012), German agroscientist
- Norbert Becker (biologist) (born 1949), German biologist
