= Suam, Uganda =

- Location in Uganda
- Coordinates: 01°13′02″N 34°43′56″E
- Country: Uganda
- Region: Eastern Region
- District: Bukwo District
- Elevation: 7,090 ft (2,160 m)

Suam, Uganda is a border crossing between Uganda and Kenya. The settlement sits directly across the Suam River from Suam, Kenya.

== Location ==
Suam is located in Bukwo District, in the Eastern Region of Uganda, approximately 13 kilometres (8 mi), by road, southeast of Bukwo, the location of the district headquarters. Suam lies approximately 142 kilometres (88 mi), by road, northeast of Mbale, the nearest large city. This location lies approximately 370 kilometres (230 mi), by road, northeast of Kampala, the capital and largest city of that country.

The average elevation is 2,160 metres (7,090 ft) above sea level.

== Points of interest ==
Suam, Uganda marks the eastern end of the Kapchorwa–Suam Road in Uganda. Across the Suam Bridge in Suam, Kenya, the Suam–Endebess–Kitale–Eldoret Road begins its 117 kilometres (73 mi) journey southeastwards to Eldoret. The governments of Kenya and Uganda are working jointly to tarmac both roads to grade II bitumen surface and improve trade between the two countries in this transport corridor. Both countries are working to establish a one-stop-border-post (OSBP) at Suam, similar to the stops established at Malaba and Busia.

== See also ==
- Mount Elgon
- Mount Elgon National Park
