= George Natembeya =

Kenyan politician (born 1971)

The Honourable George Natembeya

2nd Governor of Trans-Nzoia County
- Incumbent
- Assumed office 25 August 2022
- President: William Ruto
- Deputy: Philomena Bineah Kapkory
- Preceded by: Patrick Khaemba

Personal details
- Born: George Natembeya; 2 September 1971 (age 55) Trans Nzoia
- Citizenship: Kenya
- Party: Democratic Action Party - Kenya
- Spouse: Lilian Khaemba
- Children: 3
- Education: University of Nairobi, Barchelor of Arts in Anthropology
- Occupation: Politician
- Profession: Anthropologist
- Awards: EBS; MBS

George Natembeya (born 2 September 1971) is a Kenyan politician and the governor of Trans Nzoia County. He was first elected during the 2022 Kenyan general election on the Democratic Action Party-Kenya ticket, succeeding Patrick Khaemba. He defeated Chris Wamalwa of the Forum for the Restoration of Democracy – Kenya party with 158,919 against 79,020 votes. He served as a district officer in Trans Mara and later as the Murang'a District Commissioner. During his years in public service, Natembeya was a county commissioner of Isiolo County and later posted as the Rift Valley regional commissioner until resigning to contest in the gubernatorial elections.

== Early life and education ==
Natembeya was born on 2 September 1971 in Trans Nzoia, where his parents were squatters, before they moved to where he grew up in Bungoma. He joined Mother of Apostles Seminary Eldoret in 1986 for his secondary education up to 1989, when he completed his Kenya Certificate for Secondary Education.

After his secondary education, Natembeya joined the University of Nairobi for an undergraduate degree in anthropology, completing it in 1995. After graduating, he enrolled for a postgraduate master's in anthropology at the University of Nairobi, completing it in 1998.

== Career ==
Natembeya is an anthropologist by profession.

=== Public service ===
After completing his undergraduate degree, he was able to get a job as a district officer in 1996. He was posted at the Trans-Mara district commissioner's office. He took leave to go pursue his master's degree, and when he was back, he was posted in Elbugron, Nakuru and then moved to Burnt Forest. After a public administration course at the Kenya School of Government, he was sent to work in Mulot in Narok and then later served as a district officer in Kaplami, Trans Nzoia.

In 2005, Natembeya received a letter from Harambee House assigning him to serve as a personal assistant to the late John Michuki who at the time was serving as Kenya's Minister for State for Provincial Administration and Internal Security. He worked as a PA till 2008, when President Kibaki reshuffled the cabinet.

He went to work in Muranga as a district commissioner till 2012 and later got transferred to Kamkunji, Nairobi, in 2013 when counties were introduced. He got an assignment in 2015 as the Isiolo County commissioner before being sent to Narok in 2017. During his tenure in Narok, he led the restoration of the Mau forest by coordinating the eviction of people who had settled in the forest. Natembeya got a promotion in 2019, replacing Chimwaga Mwongo as the Rift Valley regional Commisioner. He resigned as the region commissioner before contesting for the governor's seat for Trans-Nzoia County.

=== Political career ===
In January 2022, Natembeya resigned as the Rift Valley regional commissioner to contest for governorship in Trans-Nzoia County. He contested under the Democratic Action Party ticket, winning with 158,919 votes against FORD-Kenya's Chris Wamalwa, who got 79,020 votes, succeeding Patrick Khaemba.

== Legal issues and controversies ==
=== Mau forest encroachment ===
In February 2020 the chairman of the Enkarooni Group Ranch testified in the Environment and Lands court before a three-judge bench that Natembeya had confessed to him about owning a piece of land in Enkarooni. The chairman claimed that the ranch's secretary surrendered part of his land to Natembeya through his wife.

=== Security detail withdrawal ===
Natembeya confirmed his security details had been withdrawn on 26 November 2025. The cabinet secretary for the Ministry of Interior and National Administration, Kipchumba Murkomen explained that the National Police Service withdrew the security details for investigation on claims that some of them were involved in criminal activities. On 28 November 2025, a petition was presented before justice Lawrence Mugambi by Julius Ogogoh to challenge the withdrawal of the security detail to Senator Boni Khalwale and Governor Natembeya. The petition was contending the policy on the provision of protective security to VIPs undermined the constitutional directives on protecting state officers from random executive actions.

=== Corruption charges ===
On 18 May 2025, Natembeya was arrested by detectives from the Ethics and Anti-Corruption (EACC) over graft allegations. He was charged with two counts of conflict of interest and one count of unlawful acquisition of public property contrary to the Anti-Corruption and Economic Crimes Act of 2003. Natembeya was detained at the Ethics and Anti-Corruption (EACC) offices overnight before his arraignment at the Milimani anti-corruption court the following day. Magistrate Charles Ondieki ordered his release on a Kenya Shilling 500,000 cash bail and barred him from accessing his office for 60 days. The state alleged that Natembeya received benefits indirectly totalling over 3.2 million from companies that have dealings with the Trans-Nzoia County government between 1 January 2023 and 25 April 2025. The 3.2 million was a total from the allegations of having received 1.1 million from the director of Lyma Agro Science Limited, Mercy Chelangat and 2.1 million from the owner of Easterly Winds Limited, Emmanuel Wafula Masungo.

==== Aquittal and damages ====
Justice Bahati Mwamuye quashed the anti-corruption charges against Natembeya, citing that his arrest and prosecution were unconstitutional and unlawful. Mwamunye ruled that the EACC unlawfully denied the governor access to his lawyers during his arrest, denying his constitutional right to legal representation and a fair trial. The prosecution was found to have illegally accessed his M-Pesa statements, making them inadmissible.

The court awarded Natembeya 2.5 million in damages and interest at court rates from the judgement day till full payment. The Office of the Director of Public Prosecutions (ODPP), the Directorate of Criminal Investigation (DCI) and the Ethics and Anti-Corruption Commission (EACC) were barred from investigating, recommending prosecution or starting criminal proceedings against the governor.

== Awards and state honours ==
During a gazette notice on 20 December 2019, President Uhuru Kenyatta awarded Natembeya the Elder of the Order of the Burning Spear (E.B.S) among 45 other Kenyans. He was also awarded the Moran of the Order of the Burning Spear (M.B.S) earlier on 12 December 2018, by President Uhuru Kenyatta during the Jamhuri Day celebrations.

== Personal life ==
Natembeya is married to Lilian Khaemba and together they have three children.
