= Eugene Wamalwa =

Kenyan politician (born 1969)

Honourable Eugene Ludovic Wamalwa E.G.H.
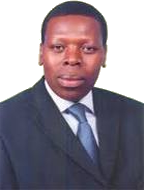

Cabinet Secretary for Defence
- In office 29 September 2021 – 27 October 2022
- President: Uhuru Kenyatta; William Ruto
- Preceded by: Monica Juma
- Succeeded by: Aden Duale

Cabinet Secretary for Devolution and ASALs
- In office 26 January 2018 – 29 September 2021
- President: Uhuru Kenyatta; William Ruto
- Preceded by: Mwangi Kiunjuri
- Succeeded by: Charles Keter

Cabinet Secretary for Water and Irrigation
- In office 9 July 2015 – 26 January 2018
- President: Uhuru Kenyatta; William Ruto
- Succeeded by: Simon Chelugui

Minister of Justice, National Cohesion and Constitutional Affairs
- In office May 2011 – April 2013
- President: Mwai Kibaki; Kalonzo Musyoka
- Preceded by: Mutula Kilonzo

Member of Parliament for Saboti
- In office January 2007 – January 2013
- Preceded by: Davis Wafula Nakitare
- Succeeded by: David Lazaro Wafula

Personal details
- Born: 1 April 1969 (age 57) Saboti, Trans Nzoia County.
- Party: DAP–K
- Spouse: Lucy Musundi
- Relations: Michael Wamalwa (Brother)
- Children: Bartholomew Wamalwa
- Education: University of Nairobi

Eugene Ludovic Wamalwa is a Kenyan politician who served as the Cabinet Secretary for Defence from September 2021 until October 2022. A member of the Azimio la Umoja, Wamalwa previously directed multiple ministries under the Uhuru Kenyatta administration, serving as Cabinet Secretary for Devolution and ASALs from January 2018 to September 2021, and as Cabinet Secretary for Water and Irrigation from July 2015 to January 2018. Prior to his cabinet appointments in the executive, he served as the Minister for Justice, National Cohesion, and Constitutional Affairs from 2012 to 2013 under President Mwai Kibaki.

Wamalwa entered national politics during the 2007 Kenyan parliamentary election, where he was elected on a Party of National Unity (PNU) ticket to represent the Saboti Constituency in the National Assembly. He served a single five-year parliamentary term in the 10th Parliament. During his tenure as a backbencher, he was a member of the Departmental Committee on Justice and Legal Affairs. He did not defend his parliamentary seat in the 2013 Kenyan general election, opting instead to focus on national party politics and his eventual appointment to the Cabinet.

== Early life and education ==
Wamalwa was born on 1 April 1969 in Kitale, Trans-Nzoia County, near the base of Mount Elgon. He was born into a prominent political family; his father, William Wamalwa, served as a post-independence Senator in the First Senate of Kenya, and his elder brother, Michael Kijana Wamalwa, later became the eighth Vice President of Kenya.

He commenced his early education in Kitale before proceeding to Gendia High School in Homa Bay County for his A-levels. Following his secondary school graduation, Wamalwa enrolled at the University of Nairobi's Parklands Campus, where he graduated with a Bachelor of Laws (LL.B.) degree. He subsequently obtained a Postgraduate Diploma in Legal Studies from the Kenya School of Law in 1993, which led to his official admission to the Kenyan bar as an advocate in 1995. He later returned to the University of Nairobi to complete a Master of Laws (LL.M.) degree.

== Legal career ==
Following his admission to the bar in 1995, Wamalwa entered private legal practice, establishing the firm Wamalwa & Associates Advocates in Nairobi. He specialized in constitutional law, commercial litigation, and election petitions.

A prominent highlight of his career as a practicing advocate occurred in 2001, when he was retained as part of the legal team representing Ugandan President Yoweri Museveni. The high-profile case involved defending Museveni's victory in the 2001 Ugandan presidential election following a Supreme Court petition filed by opposition challenger Kizza Besigye, who alleged widespread electoral irregularities. Wamalwa continued managing his private legal practice until his transition into full-time elective politics following the 2007 general elections.

== Political career ==
Following the death of his elder brother and Vice President Michael Kijana Wamalwa in August 2003, the Saboti Constituency parliamentary seat fell vacant. Wamalwa launched his entry into elective politics by contesting the subsequent November 2003 by-election under the little-known Republican Party of Kenya (RPK). He was defeated by Davies Wafula Nakitare of the ruling National Rainbow Coalition (NARC).

Wamalwa contested the Saboti parliamentary seat a second time during the 2007 Kenyan parliamentary election. Running on a FORD–Kenya ticket under the broader Party of National Unity (PNU) coalition umbrella, he secured election to the 10th Parliament.

In March 2012, during his first term as a legislator, Wamalwa was appointed to the Cabinet by President Mwai Kibaki as the Minister for Justice, National Cohesion, and Constitutional Affairs, succeeding Mutula Kilonzo. Ahead of the 2013 Kenyan general election, Wamalwa initially declared his candidacy for the presidency. However, he stepped down from the race to endorse Musalia Mudavadi, forming part of the Amani Coalition Formed by Parties: KANU UDF,NFK.

Hon. Eugene L. Wamalwa’s ministerial career under President Uhuru Kenyatta began on July 9, 2015, when he was sworn in as the Cabinet Secretary for Water and Irrigation. He spearheaded the newly detached docket until a cabinet reshuffle on January 26, 2018, transitioned him to the Ministry of Devolution and Arid and Semi-Arid Lands (ASALs). Wamalwa directed devolution policies for over three years before a subsequent reshuffle on September 29, 2021, appointed him as the Cabinet Secretary for Defence, a position he held until the conclusion of the Kenyatta administration.

During the 2022 general elections, Wamalwa aligned with the Azimio la Umoja, actively campaigning for presidential candidate Raila Odinga. Following the political realignments ahead of the 2027 electoral cycle, Wamalwa integrated his Democratic Action Party of Kenya (DAP-K) into the United Alternative Government (UAG) alliance in late 2025. Comprising a six-party opposition bloc—including Wiper, Jubilee, DCP, PLP, and DP—the coalition was formally established to mount a unified challenge against incumbent President William Ruto.
