= Wesley Korir =

Kenyan marathon runner and politician

Hon. Wesley Kipchumba Korir
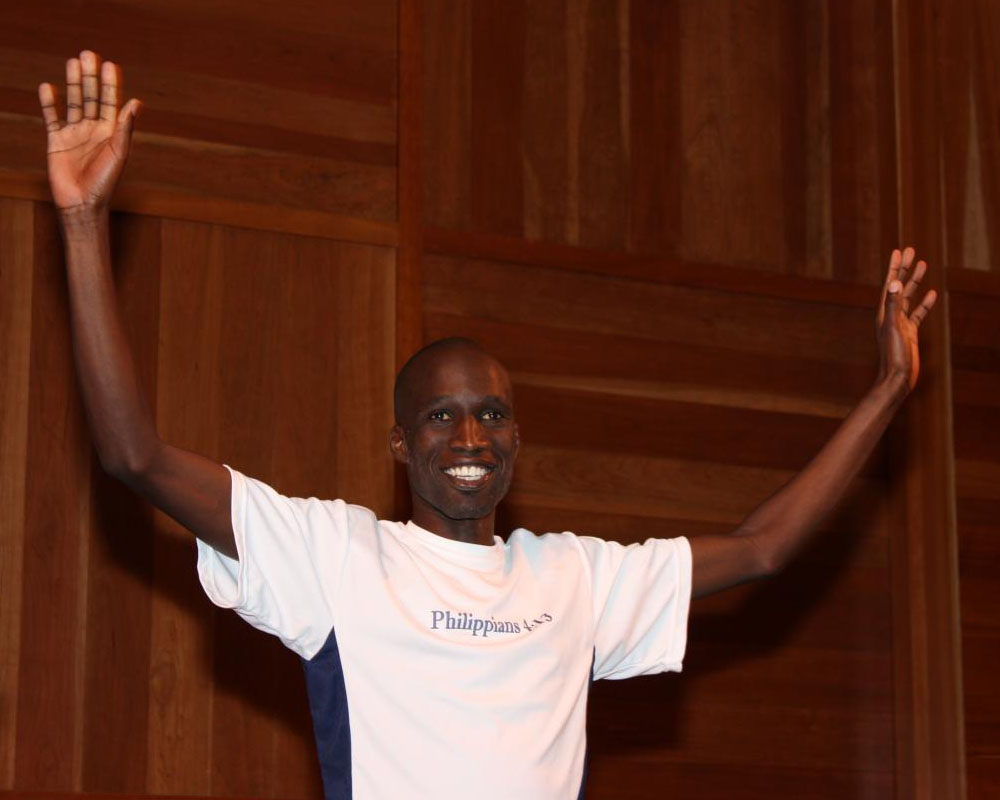
- Korir at a press conference after winning the 2009 Los Angeles Marathon
- Born: 15 November 1982 (age 43); Kitale, Trans-Nzoia District, Kenya
- Education: University of Louisville

Member of Parliament for Cherangany Constituency
- In office 28 March 2013 – 31 August 2017
- Preceded by: Joshua Serem Kutuny
- Succeeded by: Joshua Serem Kutuny
- Sports career
- Country: Kenya
- Sport: Road running
- Event(s): 1500 m, 5000 m, 10000 m, Marathon
- College team: Murray State University, University of Louisville

Sports achievements and titles
- Personal best(s): Half marathon: 1:01:19; Chicago Marathon: 2:06:13

Wesley Kipchumba Korir (15 November 1982) is a Kenyan athlete who specializes in long distance running competitions, as well as a politician who served as an elected member of Parliament for Cherangany Constituency. On 16 April 2012, he won the Boston Marathon with a time of 2 hours 12 minutes 40 seconds. He had previously won the Los Angeles Marathon in 2009 and 2010, the first back-to-back winner there in eight years. He took second place in the 2011 Chicago Marathon in a personal-record time of 2 hours 6 minutes 15 seconds, and improved that personal record by 2 seconds in the 2012 Chicago Marathon. In the 2013 Kenyan general election, Korir was elected to a seat in the National Assembly. He lost his seat in 2017.

== Athletics career ==
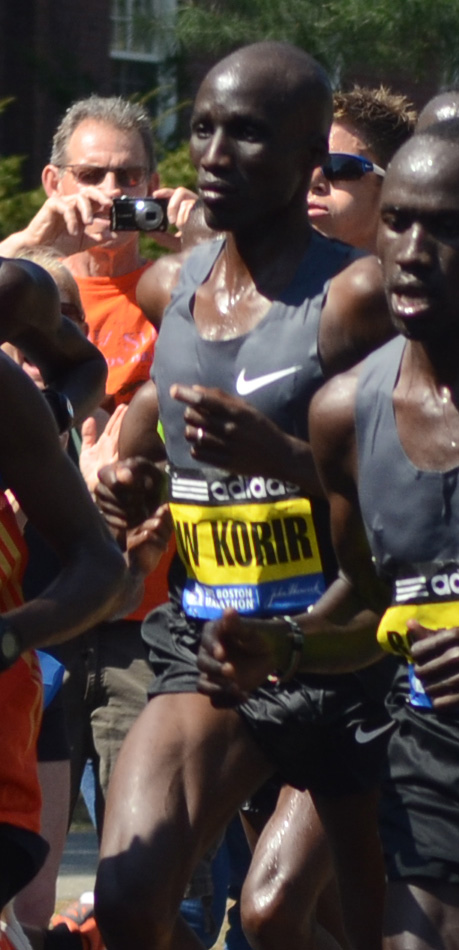
Korir in the 2012 Boston Marathon (which he won), approaching halfway point in Wellesley College scream tunnel

Korir was born on 15 November 1982 in Kitale, Trans-Nzoia District. When he was young, he would run 5 miles (8 km) each way to school, often running back for lunch or to do errands for his mother. However, he never ran competitively until after high school. Fellow Kenyan Paul Ereng, a 1988 Olympic gold medalist from the same hometown as Korir, used his contacts among college coaches in the United States to find Korir a spot at Murray State University in Kentucky. He recalled in 2013 that when he first left for the U.S., he never expected to return to his homeland:

I remember telling God, Hallelujah. I've left the poverty land. I'm going to the land of riches. In my heart and head, I never thought I would go back.

He would win both the 5000 m and 10000 m at the Ohio Valley Conference championships in 2004, but was forced to find a new school when Murray State dropped its men's track and cross country programs. Ereng put him in touch with University of Louisville track coach Ron Mann, and Korir transferred there. Korir would go on to set school records there in the outdoor 1500 m and 5000 m and the indoor mile, 3000 m and 5000 m. He would also earn All-American honors multiple times. He finished 3rd at the 2007 NCAA National Outdoor Track and Field Champions in the 5000 meter race and finished 12th in the fall of 2007 at the NCAA National Cross-Country Championships.

In 2007, he returned to Kenya for a visit, only to be caught up in the violence that followed the country's elections that year. For a short time, he was conscripted into a roving gang; he soon escaped across the Uganda border, spending two weeks as a refugee before he was able to return to Louisville. Korir recalled,

As I was going across the border, I looked at my cousin, who had to go back, and told him, bye bye. I won't see you again. I'm going to America and I'm going to be in America forever. That's what my heart was saying. But let me tell you, God had a different idea. When I said that, I believe God in heaven was laughing.

Korir moved on to the marathon only after his college career had ended. He entered the Chicago Marathon in October 2008, but with no previous marathon experience, he had to enter the open race starting five minutes behind the professional field. He would win the open division and post the fourth fastest time overall, 2:13:53. He would go on to win his next marathon, the May 2009 Los Angeles Marathon, in a time of 2:08:24 which at the time was the fastest marathon ever run in the state of California. He would repeat as champion in Los Angeles in March 2010, while continuing to post strong results in Chicago each October 2009, 2010, 2011, and 2012, including a second-place finish in 2011 in 2:06:15 and a fifth-place finish in 2012 in 2:06:13, his current personal best time.

Korir had his most significant victory to date at the 2012 Boston Marathon, where he ran a strong tactical race under extreme heat which claimed many of the pre-race favorites, including his countryman Geoffrey Mutai who had run the fastest marathon ever during the 2011 Boston event. He was considered one of the favorites for the 2012 Chicago Marathon but he faded away from leaders in the second half of the race and came fifth, although his time of 2:06:13 hours was a new personal record.

== Political career ==
In 2013, Korir was elected a member of Kenya's Parliament as an independent candidate representing Cherangany Constituency. Although elected as an independent, in 2016 he joined the Jubilee Party. In 2017, he lost a bid to represent Jubilee as the MP for Cherangany Constituency.

He is working with dairy farmers of Cherangany to improve and strengthen their yield. He also worked with Semex on Dairy Genetics. Korir's story from elite runner to politician was turned into a documentary in 2014, Transcend.

Since becoming an MP, Korir has taken up the cause of clean water in his constituency and throughout Kenya:

Water is medicine. If you can get water, you get rid of 80 percent of our diseases. That's why water is the song I am going to sing for the next five years. I'll get money from the government. And I'll put as much money as possible in water projects. But it won't be enough. That's why I will partner with people. Every dollar people give us in our area, I'm going to match it.

To that end, he briefly returned to Louisville in August 2013 to establish partnerships with individuals, businesses, and nonprofits in that area to assist him in this effort, and to get training in repairing water pumps. According to Korir, a Swedish group had installed pumps in villages throughout his region in the early 1990s, but most of them soon broke down and had not been supplying water for more than 15 years.

== Personal life ==
Korir is the son of Nehemiah Kipkorir Koros. He attended Murray State University before transferring to the University of Louisville, where he graduated in December 2008 with a bachelor's degree in biology. He is a Kenyan citizen, and a US Permanent resident.

Korir is married to a Canadian runner Tarah McKay, his former teammate on the Louisville track and field team, in March 2010, and they have three children. He and his wife founded the Kenyan Kids Foundation to improve education and healthcare in his homeland, and they are assisting with the construction of a new hospital in Korir's hometown of Kitale. Before his election to the Kenya National Assembly, the family divided its time between Louisville, Canada, and Kenya; they are living full-time in Kenya during his five-year term in office.

Korir is noted for buying two Subway tuna sandwiches before each race, one of which he eats pre-race and the other intended to eat post-race, but which he often gives to a homeless person instead.

When his younger brother John won the 2025 Boston Marathon, they became the first brothers to both win the race.

== Achievements ==
Year	Competition	Venue	Position	Event	Notes
Representing Kenya
2008	Chicago Marathon	Chicago, IL	4th	Marathon	2:13:53
2009	Los Angeles Marathon	Los Angeles, CA	1st	Marathon	2:08:24
2009	Chicago Marathon	Chicago, IL	6th	Marathon	2:10:38
2010	Los Angeles Marathon	Los Angeles, CA	1st	Marathon	2:09:19
2010	2010 Chicago Marathon	Chicago, IL	4th	Marathon	2:08:44
2011	Los Angeles Marathon	Los Angeles, CA	4th	Marathon	2:13:23
2011	2011 Chicago Marathon	Chicago, IL	2nd	Marathon	2:06:15
2012	2012 Boston Marathon	Boston, MA	1st	Marathon	2:12:40
2012	2012 Chicago Marathon	Chicago, IL	5th	Marathon	2:06:13
2013	2013 Boston Marathon	Boston, MA	5th	Marathon	2:12:30
2015	2015 Boston Marathon	Boston, MA	5th	Marathon	2:10:49
2016	2016 Boston Marathon	Boston, MA	4th	Marathon	2:14:05
2017	2017 Boston Marathon	Boston, MA	15th	Marathon	2:18:14
