= 2011 Chicago Marathon =

Foot race in Chicago, Illinois

34th Chicago Marathon
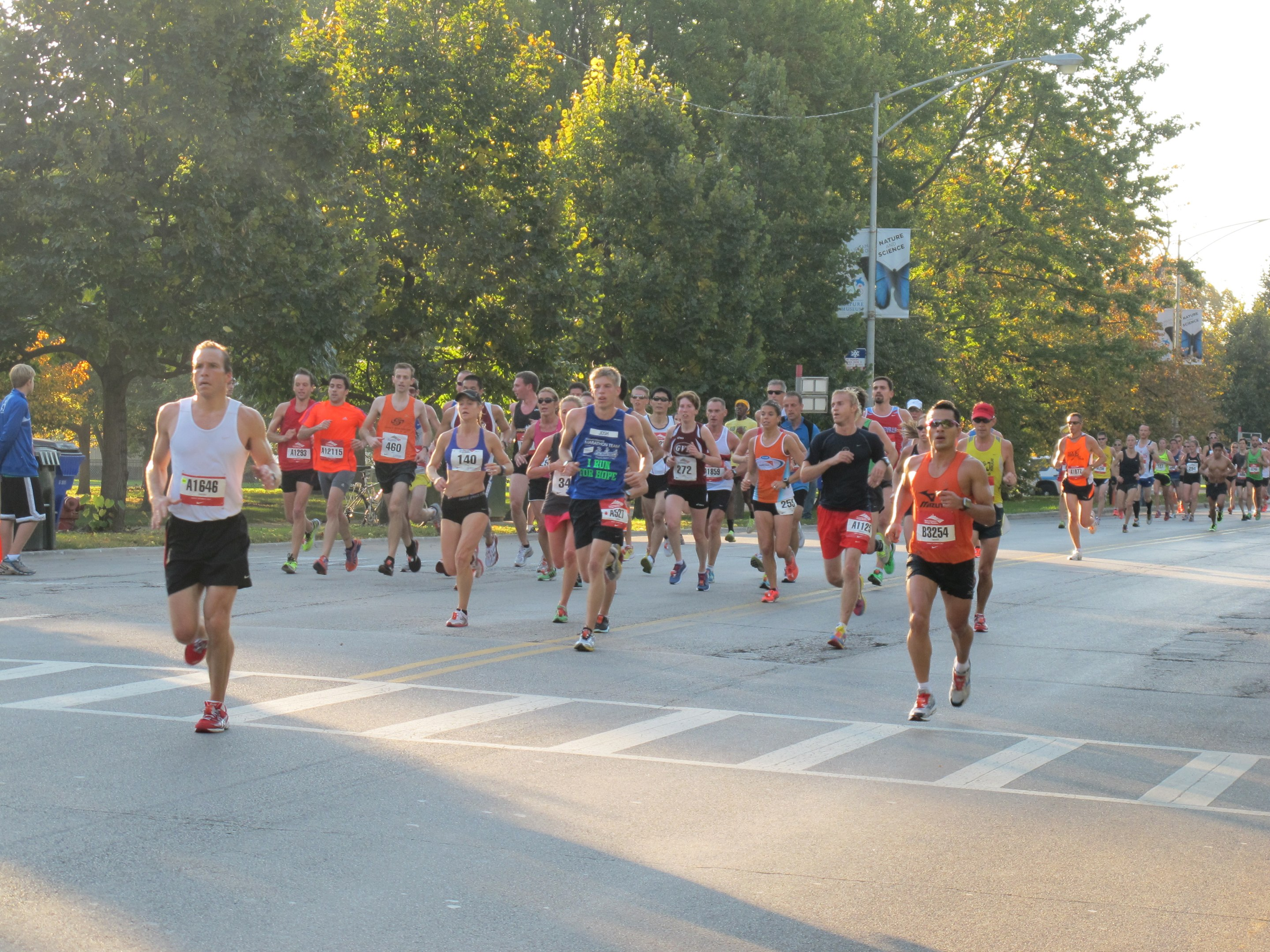
- Amateur runners in the mass race
- Venue: Chicago, United States
- Dates: October 9

Champions
- Men: Moses Mosop (2:05:37)
- Women: Ejegayehu Dibaba (2:22:09)

The 2011 Chicago Marathon was the 34th edition of the annual marathon race in Chicago, Illinois which was held on Sunday, October 9. The men's race was won by Kenya's Moses Mosop in a time of 2:05:37 hours – a course record. Ejegayehu Dibaba, making her marathon distance debut, was the women's winner in 2:22:09. Some 37,400 runners started the event (a new high for the Chicago race) and the final total of 35,670 finishers was the second highest in its history.

The pre-event favorite for the men's competition was Moses Mosop, who had run 2:03:06 for second place at the 2011 Boston Marathon and had broken two track world records at the Prefontaine Classic in July. His principal challengers were Bekana Daba, Ryan Hall, Bernard Kipyego, and the 2008 Chicago winner Evans Cheruiyot. Inconsistent pace-making for the first half of the race reduced the chances of fast times for the elite men. A large number of runners remained at the half-way point, which was reached in just under 63 minutes. The leading pack was reduced to five at the 30 km mark with Ethiopia's Bekana Daba the sole non-Kenyan alongside Wesley Korir, Mosop, Kipyego and Cheruiyot. Mosop pulled away and increased his lead over the final 12 km to win in a course record time of 2:05:38 hours (four seconds faster than the late Samuel Wanjiru's time from 2009). Korir finished quickly to cross the line after 2:06:15 hours and Kipyego soon followed to complete the sixth Kenyan podium sweep of the race's history.

In the women's section, Liliya Shobukhova was expected to be the main protagonist and Askale Tafa, Belaynesh Zemedkun, and Kayoko Fukushi were the next fastest entrants. From the beginning, Shobukhova set a fast starting pace, departing from her usual slower-starting tactics. Ejegayehu Dibaba, a former Olympic track medalist but marathon débutante, kept pace with her, as did Fukushi. The trio remained together up to the half-marathon point, where they all clocked a time of 69:25 minutes. After that point, Shobukhova sped away and remained unchallenged. She completed the second half of the race faster than the first and her time of 6:52 minutes over the final 2.195 km was the third fastest of anyone that day after elite men Wesley Korir and Ryan Hall. Shobukhova's winning time of 2:18:20 hours made her the second-fastest woman ever behind Paula Radcliffe and improved her Russian record by nearly two minutes. However, Shobukhova was subsequently stripped of her three Chicago Marathon titles in April 2014 as IAAF officials stripped her of all titles since October 2009 as a result of an elaborate doping scandal. Dibaba officially was credited with the win following the IAAF decision, with an official winning time of 2:22:09 hours. Fukushi and Ethiopian Belaynesh Zemedkun completed the women's podium, finishing in times of 2:24:38 hours and 2:26:17 hours, respectively.

One person died during the running of the marathon: Will Caviness, a 35-year-old firefighter, collapsed 500 yards from the finish line. Amateur runner Amber Miller from Westchester, Illinois, completed the race in a time of 6:25:50 hours. Miller garnered international attention as she ran while 38 weeks 5 days pregnant and gave birth to daughter June Audra Miller hours later. Kurt Fearnley and Tatyana McFadden were the winners of the men's and women's wheelchair races, respectively.

== Results ==
=== Elite races ===
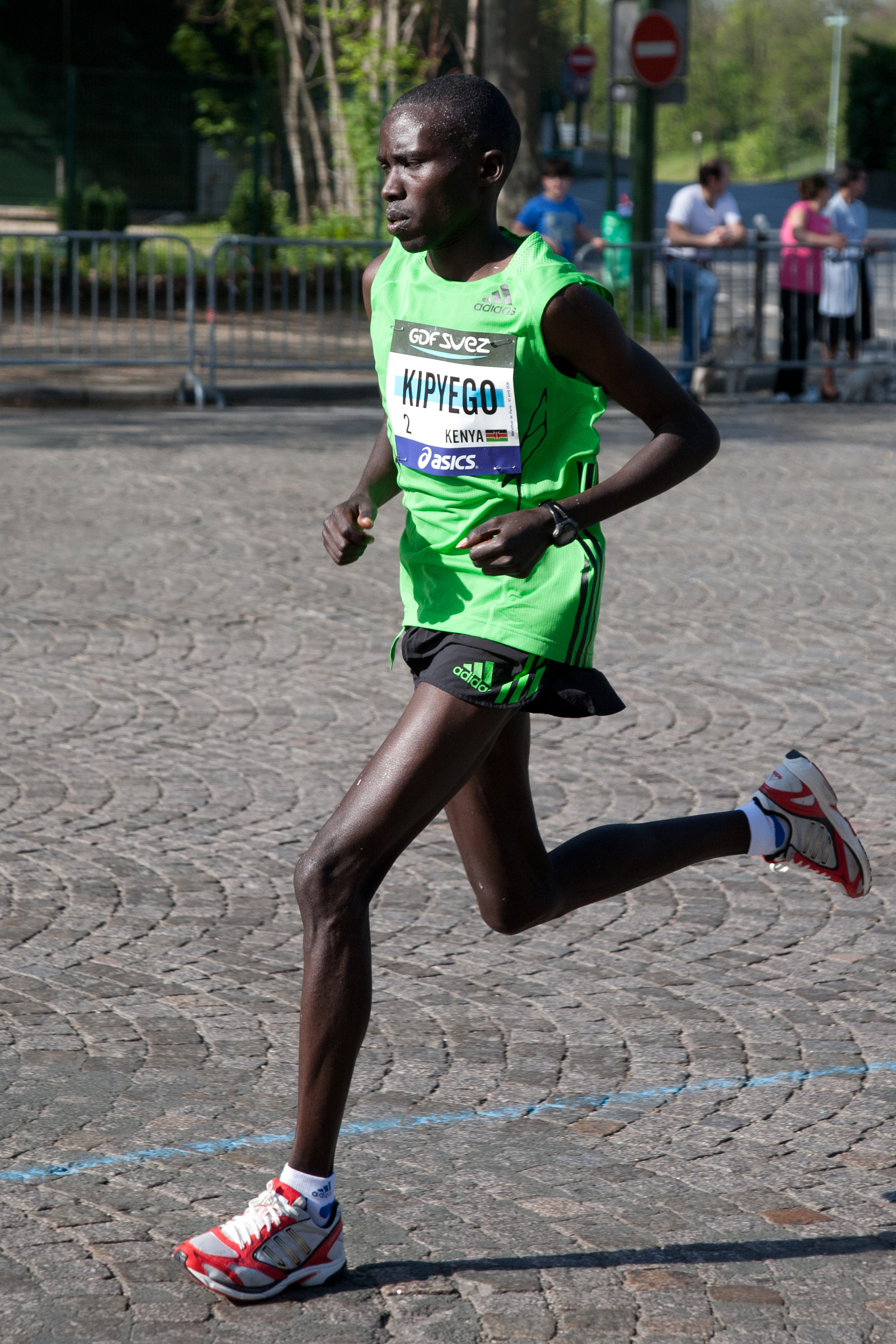
Third placer Bernard Kipyego completed a Kenyan podium sweep.

- Race start time: 7:30:04 AM

Men

Place	Athlete	Nationality	Time
1	Moses Mosop	Kenya	2:05:37
2	Wesley Korir	Kenya	2:06:15
3	Bernard Kipyego	Kenya	2:06:29
4	Bekana Daba	Ethiopia	2:07:59
5	Ryan Hall	United States	2:08:04
6	Evans Cheruiyot	Kenya	2:10:29
7	Koji Gokaya	Japan	2:12:15
8	Hironori Arai	Japan	2:13:17
9	Takashi Horiguchi	Japan	2:14:48
10	Masaki Shimoju	Japan	2:17:49

Women

Place	Athlete	Nationality	Time
1	Ejegayehu Dibaba	Ethiopia	2:22:09
2	Kayoko Fukushi	Japan	2:24:38
3	Belaynesh Zemedkun	Ethiopia	2:26:17
4	Christelle Daunay	France	2:26:41
5	Claire Hallissey	United Kingdom	2:29:27
6	Yue Chao	China	2:32:57
7	Askale Tafa	Ethiopia	2:33:35
8	Cruz Nonata da Silva	Brazil	2:35:35
9	Jeannette Faber	United States	2:36:58

=== Wheelchair ===
Men

Place	Athlete	Nationality	Time
1	Kurt Fearnley	Australia	1:29:18
2	Heinz Frei	Switzerland	1:29:23
3	Joshua George	United States	1:29:23

Women

Place	Athlete	Nationality	Time
1	Tatyana McFadden	United States	1:45:00
2	Christine Dawes	Australia	1:47:01
3	Diane Roy	Canada	1:47:11

== See also ==
- List of winners of the Chicago Marathon
