= Patrick Khaemba =

Kenyan politician

1st Governor of Trans-Nzoia County
- In office 2013 – 25 August 2022
- Preceded by: Post established
- Succeeded by: George Natembeya

Personal details
- Born: Patrick Simiyu Khaemba; 14 December 1955 (age 70) Bungoma, Kenya
- Party: Ford–Kenya

Patrick Simiyu Khaemba (born 14 December 1955) is a Kenyan politician. He was the first Governor of Trans-Nzoia County from 2013 to 2022. He was elected into office in 2013 during the Kenya general elections. He is a member of the Coalition for Reforms and Democracy. He was elected under the Forum for the Restoration of Democracy – Kenya.

== Early life and education ==
Khaemba was born 1956 in Bungoma District, Kenya. He has a master's degree in Public Management.

== Career ==
Khaemba before going into politics served as the Head of the African Development Bank in Uganda. He was then appointed Permanent Secretary in the Ministry of Livestock Development before taking up a position with the United Nations for a short while. In 2013 he vied for gubernatorial seat in Trans-Nzoia County and was elected.

== Controversy ==
Patrick Khaemba was summoned before a senate committee on Public Accounts and Investments over irregularities in the county's audit. Khaemba was said to have used Sh4.1 million in fueling private cars and Sh4.9 million paid for fuel that was not supplied to the county government. Khaemba lashed out on the senate committee over grilling him.
