= Joseph Magutt =

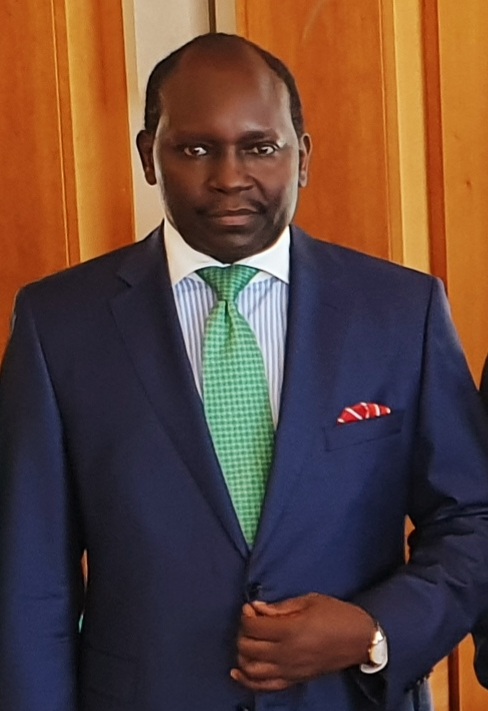
Joseph Magutt

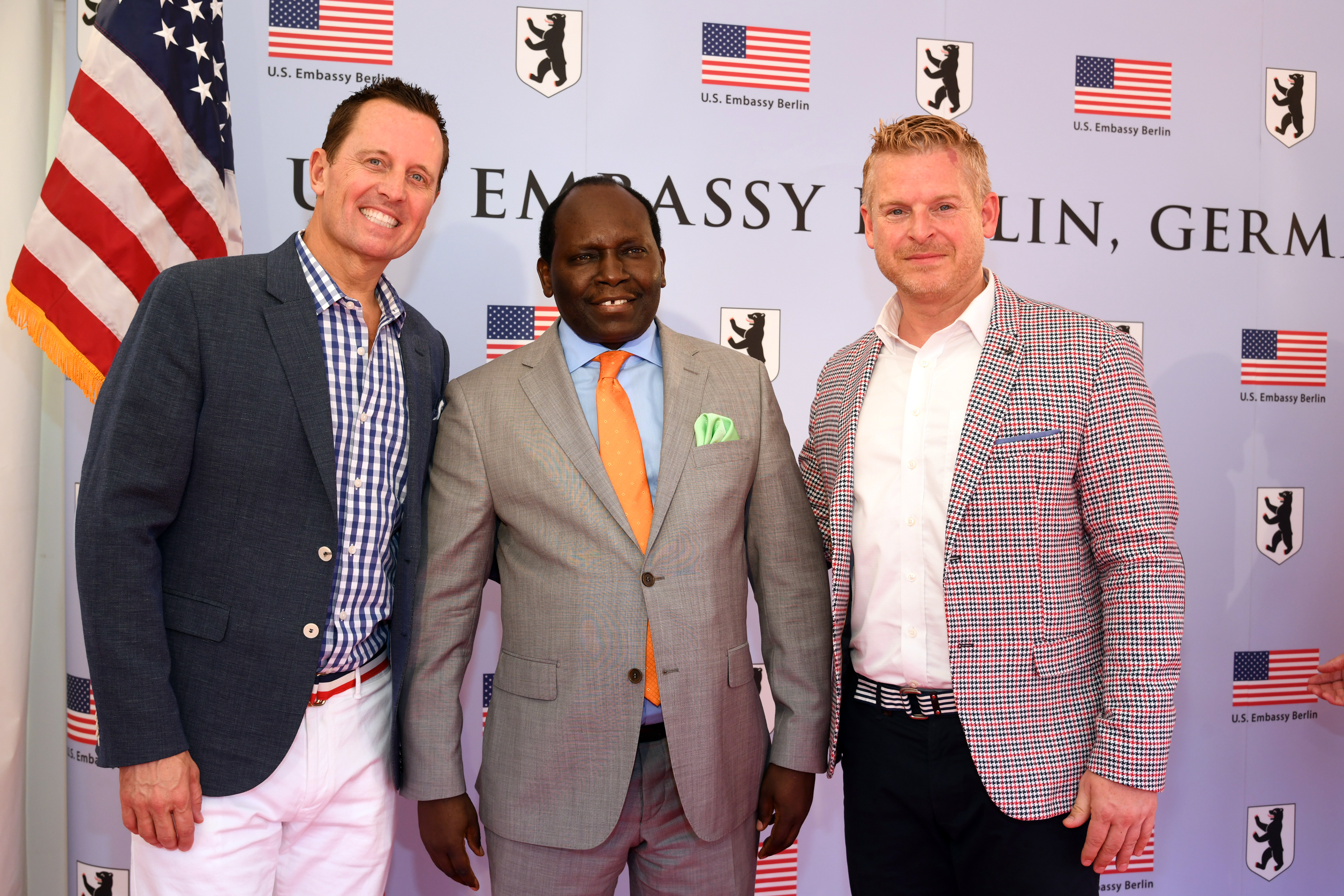
Joseph Magutt (center) with Richard Grenell and Matt Lashey, 4th of July 2018 in Berlin

Joseph Magutt is a Kenyan academic, diplomat and geopolitical consultant. He was appointed by President Uhuru Kenyatta as Ambassador Extraordinary and Plenipotentiary to the Federal Republic of Germany with accreditation in Romania and Bulgaria in August 2014. His diplomatic appointment under the new constitution was for the first time in the history of Kenya subjected to vetting and approval by parliament of the republic of Kenya.

Until his ambassadorial appointment, Magutt was lecturer of political science at Kenyatta University. He also taught on part time, graduate and undergraduate classes in several universities among them: the United States International University, Moi University, Jomo Kenyatta University of Agriculture and Technology and Egerton University.

== Early life and education ==
Magutt was brought up in Eldoret–Kitale districts in Kenya's Rift Valley. His mother Pauline Cherotich, a devout Christian raised her children based on strict Christian values, following the demise of her husband Kimagutt Koross. He earned his bachelor's degree from Kenyatta University and soon after proceeded for further studies. While pursuing his undergraduate studies Magutt took interest in student politics and contested for student presidency. It was during this period that he was drawn into national debates and politics, a platform that enabled him to meet and interact with influential political as well as institutional leaders among them: Daniel Arap Moi, George Eshiwani, Raila Odinga, Kenneth Matiba among other.

== Diplomatic career ==
The recast of Kenya's foreign policy in the post Cold War order placed economic diplomacy as its central pillar in its bilateral and international engagements. This diplomatic philosophy primarily informed Magutt's engagement during his tour of duty. Magutt, initiated as one of his first-to-do assignment the official visit by president Uhuru Kenyatta to Germany after almost 20 years since a Kenyan head of state had visited Germany officially or privately. The arrival of president Uhuru Kenyatta in Germany on a three-day (6 - 8 April 2016) state visit on the invitation of Chancellor Angela Merkel was a reaffirmation of the cordial and excellent bilateral ties between Kenya and Germany. The talks between the two leaders centered on trade, foreign investment and security.

The return of the German car maker Volkswagen (VW) to the Kenyan market after four decades could not have been Magutt's significant moment in his diplomatic career. His efforts culminated in the commissioning of the automobile assembly plant in Thika by president Uhuru Kenyatta in December 2016. In line with Kenya's development blue print and Vision 2030, such an investment was welcome in spurring the manufacturing sector as well as creating job opportunities.

Magutt successfully lobbied for Kenya to host the first ever German–Africa Business Summit in the African continent that brought together leading German companies and captains of the industry as well as African business entities and policy makers to Nairobi. The event which took place from 8–10 February 2017, brought together the who is who in Germany's business landscape and was thought to have generated German investment interest in Kenya. The German delegation was led by Gerd Muller, cabinet minister for Economic Cooperation and Development (BMZ). Magutt, negotiated for the resumption of direct Lufthansa passenger flights from Frankfurt to Nairobi ending an 18-year hiatus. This development has had positive impact on Kenya's tourism and business traffic particularly considering that Germany is a key market source of tourism to the former.

Magutt enjoyed close working relations with German leadership and worked closely with Chancellor Angela Merkel as well as members of parliament especially the Bundestag, as well as the key private sector entities viz SAFRI, IHK, KFW, BDI, Afrika Verein, a fact that enabled him to advance Kenya's interests.

== Role in Kenya's politics and leadership ==
Magutt was a member of the Orange Democratic Movement- Party of Kenya (ODM) campaign team in 2007 and contributed in campaign planning, strategy and writing of the party manifesto towards Raila Odinga's presidential bid in the 2007 general election

In 2019 Magutt announced that he will contest the seat of Governor for Trans - Nzoia County in the 2022 national elections.

In 2002 Joseph Magutt was nationally nominated KTN's person of the year under forty, in what was billed "TOP 40 UNDER 40". This was a national survey of young people who had played significant national role and had distinguished themselves in leadership and influenced the lives of many positively. The nominees were voted by the public nationally.

== Media and professional engagements ==
Magutt comments on local and international political and topical debates. His contributions feature in Kenya's leading newspapers such as the Daily Nation, and The Standard, among other. He is also a frequent panelist on several national and international TV and Radio outlets on critical debates, among these are the Voice of America, Kenya Television Network (KTN), Citizen TV, Nation Television (NTV), Classic 105 fm, Kiss 100 FM, Kass FM etc.

In 2012 through 2013, Magutt was a resident panelist for NTVs prime political show “This is the Point” on AM Live, that was hosted by the political talk show journalist Debarl Inea.

== Private life ==
In his private life, Magutt breeds horses, Llamas and exotic birds. He is the National Chairman of the Llama and Alpaca Owners Association of Kenya.
