= Kapchorwa–Suam Road =

Rural road in the Eastern Region of Uganda

Coordinates: 01°25′03″N 34°37′20″E

Route information
- Length: 48 mi (77 km)
- History: Designated in 2018; Completed in 2021 (Expected)

Major junctions
- West end: Kapchorwa
- East end: Suam

Location
- Country: Uganda

Highway system
- Roads in Uganda

The Kapchorwa–Suam Road, is a rural road in the Eastern Region of Uganda. The road links Kapchorwa, the district capital of Kapchorwa District to Suam, at the international border with Kenya.

== Location ==
The highway will start at Kapchorwa and continue in a general westerly direction to go through Kween in Kween District, then turn in a southeasterly direction to go through Bukwo in Bukwo District and end at Suam, on the banks of the Suam River, which forms the border between Uganda and Kenya. The total road distance is approximately 78 kilometres (48 mi).

== Overview ==
The existing road is gravel surface. Most of the road lies within Mount Elgon National Park. The steep terrain becomes muddy and slippery during the wet season.

== Updating to bitumen surface ==
As early as 2010, the government of Uganda, through Uganda National Roads Authority (UNRA), started planning to upgrade the road to grade II bitumen surface with shoulders and drainage channels. In the earlier years, loans were sought from the World Bank and the Danish International Development Agency.

In 2014, Kenyan print media reported that the governments of Kenya and Uganda were working together to develop the Kapchorwa–Suam Road in Uganda and the Suam–Endebess–Kitale–Eldoret Road in Kenya. UNRA and the Kenya National Highways Authority (KNHA) are jointly seeking funding from the African Development Bank to jointly develop that road corridor in order to promote trade between the two neighboring countries. It is anticipated that physical works will commence in the 2016/2017 financial year. The Ugandan section of the road will cost an estimated $80 million (UShs270 billion), funded by the African Development Bank and the government of Uganda.

In August 2018, Yoweri Museveni, the president of Uganda and William Ruto, the deputy president of Kenya, officially kick-started the rehabilitation and improvement of this road. The projected cost estimate is US$105.76 million, financed by loans from the African Development Bank (AfDB) and African Development Fund (AfDF) and counterpart funding by the Government of Uganda. The improvement to the 73 kilometres (45 mi) road is expected to last 36 months.

As of February 2022, the UNRA public relations officer estimated the completed section to amount to approximately 60 percent. At that time, full completion was contemplated in December 2022. Commercial commissioning of the completed road is expected in 2024.

== See also ==
- List of roads in Uganda
- Kakira–Kisumu Expressway
