= Kakira–Kisumu Expressway =

Road in Kenya and Uganda

Coordinates: 00°17′52″N 34°12′32″E

Route information
- Length: 163 mi (262 km)
- History: Designated in 2026 (Expected); Completion in 2030 (Expected)

Major junctions
- West end: Kakira
- Busitema; Malaba; Kisian
- East end: Kisumu

Location

Highway system
- Transport in

The Kakira–Kisumu Expressway, also Kenya–Uganda Highway, is a road in Uganda and Kenya, connecting the cities of Kakira and Iganga in Uganda to Busia, Malaba and Kisumu in Kenya.

== Location ==
The road starts at Kakira, Uganda and makes its way eastwards through Iganga, Bugiri and Busitema. At Busitema the road takes a right turn and travels southeastwards through Busia and enters Kenya. The road then continues southeast through Matayos and Kisian to end in Kisumu. The road distance between Kakira, Uganda and Kisumu, Kenya is approximately 221 kilometres (137 mi).

A second leg of this road branches off at Busitema and continues eastwards to the Kenyan border at Malaba, a distance of about 42 kilometres (26 mi). The total distance within Uganda is approximately 143 kilometres (89 mi), while that in Kenya is about 120 kilometres (75 mi), for a total road distance of about 263 kilometres (163 mi).

== Upgrade to double carriageway ==
As a preliminary to the rehabilitation and expansion of this single carriageway road to class II bitumen and widening to double carriageway, feasibility studies funded by the African Development Bank are underway.

The contract for the feasibility studies was awarded to GOPA Infra Gmbh of Germany and ITEC Limited of Kenya, at a contract price of US$1,499,587.00. The studies are expected to last 18 months starting in May 2024.

The entire length of the road will be improved to class II bitumen standard, with culverts and drainage channels. The section of this road between Busia, Kenya and Kisian, Kenya measuring 104 kilometres (65 mi) will be expanded to dual carriageway (two lanes in each direction). The road improvement project is being undertaken by the East African Community, as part of decongesting the Northern Corridor. The work includes the improvement of the Malaba and Busia "One Stop Border Point"s (OSBP)s and the conversion of Lwakhakha to an OSBP.

== See also ==
- List of roads in Kenya
- List of roads in Uganda
- Kapchorwa–Suam Road
- Suam–Endebess–Kitale–Eldoret Road
- East African Community
