= Wafula Wabuge =

Kenyan politician

Wafula Wabuge (27 March 1927 – 28 November 1996) was a politician from Kenya.

Wabuge was a Member of Parliament for Kitale West Constituency (later Saboti Constituency).

He was a close ally of influential politician Masinde Muliro.
