= Robert Pukose =

Kenyan politician

Dr. Robert Pukose is a Kenyan politician. He was elected a member of Parliament Endebess in the Trans Nzoia county in the year 2013 to date. He was the First MP after 2010 Constitution and formation of Endebess constituency. The Watlrd is made up of Sabaot, Nandi, Bukusu, Turkana, and Pokot ethnic groups. He vied on a URP (URP) ticket and emerged victorious after beating his closest rival. He is a trained Medical Doctor by Profession.
