= Noah Wekesa =

Kenyan politician

Dr. Noah Wekesa
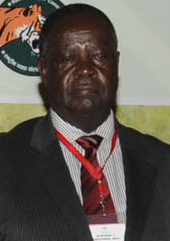

Minister for Forestry and Wildlife
- In office 2008–2012

Minister for Science and Technology
- In office December 2005 – 2007

Minister for Education (acting)
- In office 2007–2007

Assistant Minister for Livestock and Fisheries
- In office May 2004 – 2005

Assistant Minister of Agriculture and Livestock Development
- In office 1988–1992

Member of Parliament for Kwanza Constituency
- In office 1988 – March 2013
- Preceded by: Constituency established (1988)
- Succeeded by: Ferdinand Wanyonyi

Personal details
- Born: Noah Mahalang’ang’a Wekesa; August 21, 1936 (age 89) Kenya
- Party: Party of National Unity
- Children: Paul Wekesa
- Education: Kakamega School
- Alma mater: University of Edinburgh (BVM&S)
- Occupation: Politician, Veterinarian
- Known for: Politics, Rally Driving, Tennis Administration

Noah Mahalang’ang’a Wekesa (born 21 August 1936) is a Kenyan politician. He is affiliated to the Party of National Unity and was elected in the 1988, 2000, 2002 and in the 2007 Kenyan general election to represent the Kwanza Constituency of the National Assembly of Kenya. He was succeeded by Ferdinand Wanyonyi in March 2013. Wekesa was Assistant Minister of Agriculture and Livestock Development from 1988 to 1992 and May 2004 as Assistant Minister for Livestock and Fisheries. He was the Minister for Science and Technology from December 2005 to 2007 and also acted as Minister for Education in 2007. He was the Minister for Forestry and Wildlife from 2008 to 2012.

He was educated at Kakamega School and graduated from the University of Edinburgh with a Bachelor's degree in Veterinary Medicine and Surgery.

He was elected to parliament for the first time in 1988 in the last one-party-system elections in Kenya. He used to be a rally driver and he has featured in Safari Rally. He was a chairman of the Kenya Lawn Tennis Association. His son Paul Wekesa is a retired prominent tennis player.
