= Presidency of Mwai Kibaki =

Government of Kenya from 2002 to 2013

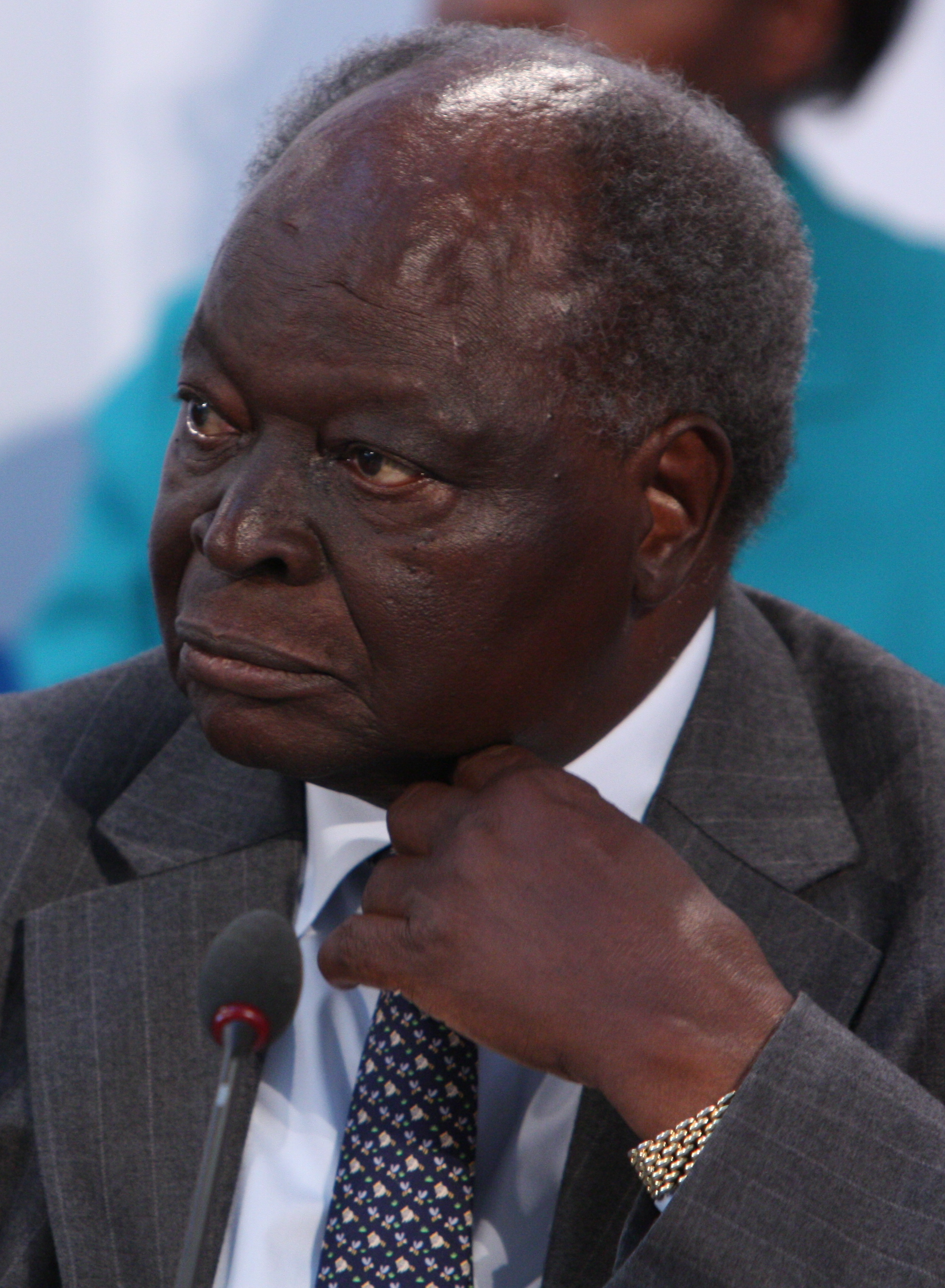
- Kibaki in 2012
- Presidency of Mwai Kibaki; 30 December 2002 – 9 April 2013
- President: Mwai Kibaki
- Party: NARC
- Election: 2002
- Seat: State House
- Standard of the President

The presidency of Mwai Kibaki began at 11:00 AM GMT on Monday 30 December 2002, when Mwai Kibaki was inaugurated as the 3rd president of Kenya and ended on 9 April 2013 when he handed over to Uhuru Kenyatta. A NARC candidate, Kibaki was a businessman and member of parliament of Othaya constituency prior to his 2002 election victory over KANU nominee Uhuru Kenyatta.

== Transition period and inauguration ==
On 30 December 2002, while still recovering from near-fatal accident on 3 December, Mwai Kibaki, was wheeled into the dais at Nairobi's Uhuru Park, to a frenzied crowd that had come to witness the swearing in of Kenya's third President. Kibaki had garnered 62 per cent of the votes while his party won 132 seats in the unicameral parliament of 210 seats.

He was inaugurated at 1:00 AM EAT. Accompanied by his campaign team, headed by Raila, Moody and Wamalwa, Kibaki addressed the nation and made promises based on his campaign agenda of fighting corruption.

Some 100,000 supporters attended the swearing in. In his inaugural address, President Mwai Kibaki, who had been elected on a National Rainbow Coalition (NARC) ticket said he felt honored by the overwhelming support he had received.

The swearing in ceremony was witnessed by many dignitaries and foreign heads of states, including presidents of Uganda, Tanzania and Zambia as well as the prime minister of Rwanda and Zanele Mbeki, the wife of the South African president, Thabo Mbeki.

== Cabinet ==
As a requirement, the president is expected to announce his cabinet shortly after taking office. Kibaki announced the list of his cabinet ministers on 4 January at 2:00 pm.

== Manifesto ==
When he became president, Kibaki inherited a weak and declining economy and a corrupt system, which promised to change by increasing school enrollment, implementing free primary education, introducing basic and affordable health care access to all citizens and rehabilitating roads and other infrastructure. He also vowed to sustain peace and uphold the constitution.

== Achievements ==
Mwai Kibaki made several landmark achievements during his first term as president of Kenya.

=== Free Primary Education ===
To improve the education system, Kibaki introduced the free primary education program and made it accessible to everyone, especially children from ages of six years to thirteen years. This program resulted in a record number of children attending school. Within his first term in office, one million children who previously lacked the financial means to attend school enrolled in public primary schools.

=== Revitalization of agriculture ===
Another campaign promise that Kibaki made to his supporters was improvement of the Agricultural sector in Kenya. Immediately he was elected president, President Kibaki promised to empower the farmers and expand the farming acreage. His other main project was opening up of failed irrigation schemes and the mechanisation of agriculture. These initiatives led to a boom in Agriculture in Kenya.

Additionally, Kibaki endorsed projects to rehabilitate and expand irrigation schemes such as Bura, Hola, West Kano, Mwea, Nzoia, Ahero and Katilu. This increased area under irrigation from 119,200 hectares to 151,800 hectares. In addition, new schemes were opened up in the Yala swamp, Katilu and Lokubae in Turkana, Kibwezi, Masinga, Kiambere, among others. While Kibaki managed to expand irrigation schemes such as Bura, he failed to fulfill most of these promises.

The promotion of agro-based industries and agricultural exports became one of his pet projects. Despite difficulties of drought, and increased global fuel prices, the Kibaki government managed to put agriculture as a driver of the national economy.

In 2003, the number of people Who Were living below the absolute poverty lines of one dollar a day and were food insecure because they could not have access to one full meal a day was 56 per cent and 52 per cent respectively. By the time he left power, these numbers had declined to 46 per cent and 36 per cent respectively.
