= American Mosquito Control Association =

- Abbreviation: AMCA
- Formation: June 26, 1935
- Type: Non-profit organization
- Purpose: Public service
- Headquarters: Sacramento, California
- Members: +1,600 (2025)
- President: Herff Jones
- Technical Advisor: Daniel Markowski, PhD
- Publication: Journal of the American Mosquito Control Association
- Affiliations: New Jersey Mosquito Control Association
- Website: www.mosquito.org

The American Mosquito Control Association (AMCA) is an American nonprofit organization and the world's leading organization dedicated to mosquito control. It was established in Trenton, New Jersey, in 1935 as the Eastern Association of Mosquito Control Workers, obtaining its current name in 1944. Currently, it is based in Sacramento, CA. It publishes the Journal of the American Mosquito Control Association.

== See also ==
- European Mosquito Control Association
- German Mosquito Control Association
- Pan-Africa Mosquito Control Association
- Yesterday's Threats, Today's Solutions
