= Norbert Becker (biologist) =

German biologist (born 1949)

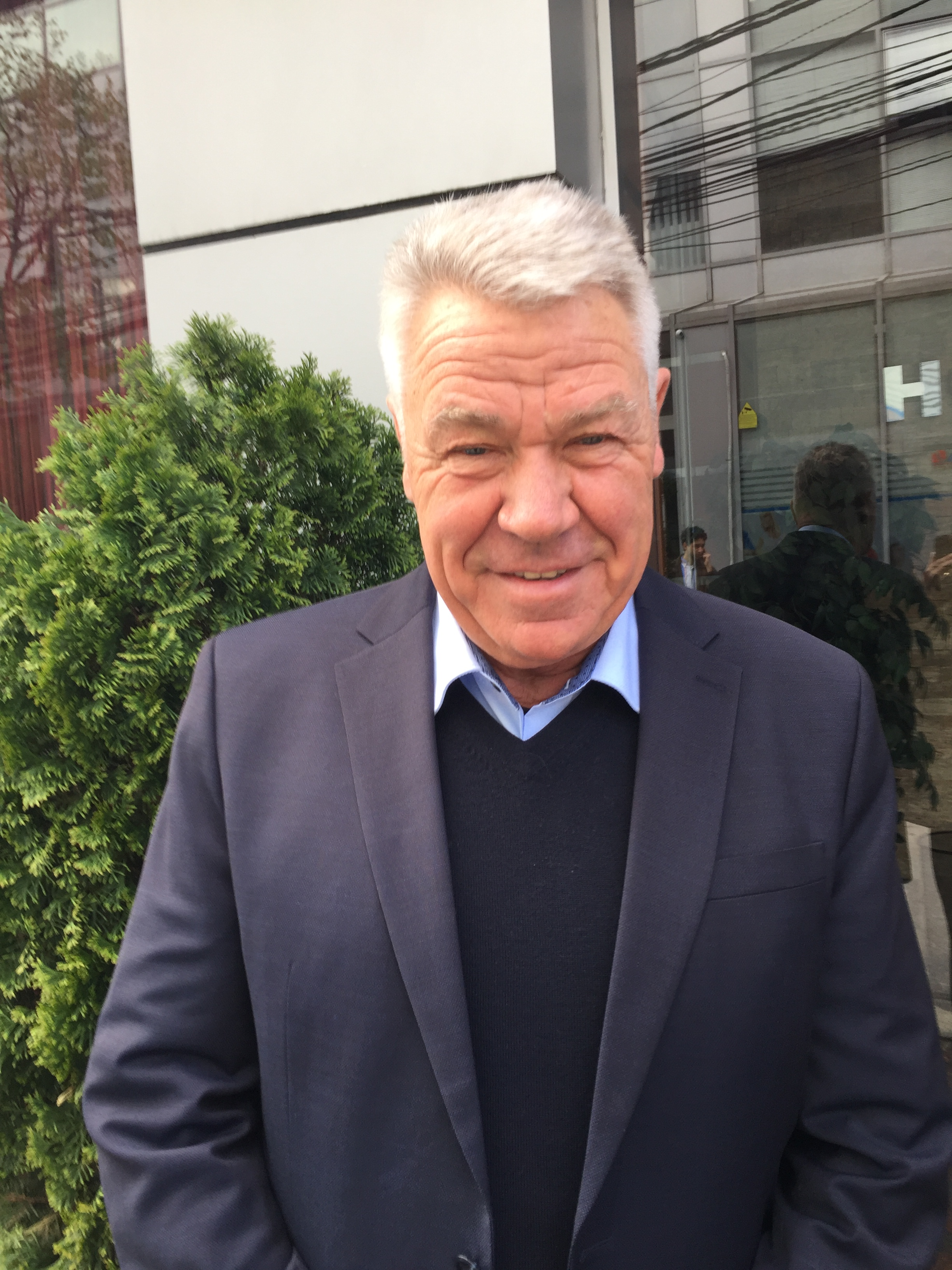
Norbert Becker (2019)

Norbert Becker (born 1949 in Hüffelsheim, Landkreis Bad Kreuznach) is a German biologist, university lecturer at the University of Heidelberg, scientific-technical director of KABS, and managing director and vice-president of the European Mosquito Control Association (EMCA). He is also president of the World Mosquito Control Association (WMCA).

== Life and works ==
After finishing school Becker studied at Heidelberg University and obtained a Bachelor of Science Degree in biology, physics and chemistry in 1974. He obtained a Master of Science degree in biology in 1976 at the Zoological Institute of the same university in 1976. He then obtained a doctorate in Natural Science there, followed by professorship in biology with Venia Legendi in Zoologie at the Faculty of Bioscience in 1993.

He has been a lecturer at Heidelberg University since 1977, where he became a professor in 2008, and gives tutorials in medical entomology und oncology at its Zoological Institute. As a professor, Becker supervises doctoral students in entomology (e.g. medical entomology) and applied field research in Heidelberg.

Becker has been active in mosquito control in the upper Rhine (Schnakenbekämpfung am Oberrhein) since 1976, and since 1981 is the Scientific Director of the German Mosquito Control Organisation and Technical Director of the Community Action Committee for the Fight Against Mosquito Infestation (Kommunalen Aktionsgemeinschaft zur Bekämpfung der Schnakenplage) in Speyer.

In addition Becker is involved in numerous international organisations and is founding president of the World Mosquito Control Association.

Norbert Becker is married and has four grown-up children.

== Activities (selection) ==
- Member of the Steering Committee (SC) for biology and vector control (BCV) of the (WHO / TDR) in Geneva 1989–1994
- Advisor to WHO / TDR in applied field research, extensive vector-associated consultation as member of the SC for BCV, WHO / TDR in Asia, Africa and South America since 1995
- Director of the Society for Vector Ecology (SOVE European Region) von 1988–1990
- President of the worldwide active organisation SOVE in 1993
- Managing Director and Vide-President of the European Mosquito Control Association (EMCA) since 2000.
- Member of the German Expert Committee Mosquitoes as vectors of human diseases since 2015
- President of the World Mosquito Control Association (WMCA) since 2015

Becker‘s goal is to establish a globally active organisation for the control of mosquitos as carriers of disease (Mosquito Control Associations) within the world-wide organisation WMCA in order to limit disease spread by mosquitos in a coordinated manner. By 2018 Becker had published more than two hundred articles

== Honours and awards ==
- National Medal of the Slovenian Republic for his successful involvement in mosquito control, presented by the Slovenian Minister of Tourism in Bonn in 1992
- Distinguished Service Award of the Society for Vector Ecology in 1997
- Escherich-Preis of the German Society of Entomology in 2001
- Order of Merit of the Federal Republic of Germany in 2004
- Meritorious Service Award of the American Mosquito Control Association 2010
- Distinguished Life Time Service Award for dedication and outstanding services to the Society for Vector Ecology (SOVE), International Congress of SOVE, Spain 2017

== Literature ==
- Norbert Becker, Glaser, P., Magin, H.: Biological Mosquito Control on the Upper Rhine, (Commemorative) 20 Years of the Communal Action Organisation against Mosquito Infestation 1996. ISBN 3-00-000584-6
- Norbert Becker et al.ː Mosquitoes and their Control (English), Verlag: Springer, 2nd edition 2010 ISBN 978-3-540-92873-7
