= Grantham & Melton Cricket Association =

Regional English cricket league

- Countries: England
- Format: Limited overs cricket
- First edition: 1984 (Founded)
- Tournament format: League
- Number of teams: 20 (Divisions 1 & 2)
- Current champion: Barrow Town CC
- Website: https://gmca.play-cricket.com

The Grantham & Melton Cricket Association (GMCA) is a Sunday League that administers cricket clubs that participate in its league, cup and trophy competitions. The league headquarters is based in Grantham, Lincolnshire.

The Grantham & Melton Cricket Association was established in 1984 and membership of the Association was opened to all cricket clubs within a radius of 20 miles from Leicestershire village of Buckminster (situated on the Leicestershire - Lincolnshire border) - referred to as The District. Clubs participating in the league are mainly from the north east of Leicestershire and South Kesteven District of Lincolnshire, but some clubs are from beyond the county boundary, with representatives from Rutland, Nottinghamshire and as far west as Hinckley, Leicestershire, which is only a few kilometers from the Warwickshire border. During the 2021 season, the GMCA held 28 clubs in the League which were divided into 3 Divisions.

The most notable team in recent years is Queniborough. In 2019, after an impressive four-year run as League Champions, Queniborough CC were heading towards their 5th successive League Championship title, only for it to be snatched away by the British Shoe Corporation CC.

Grantham & Melton Cricket Association 2021

== Past winners ==
Year	Champions
2013	Buckminster
2014	Houghton-on-the-Hill
2015	Queniborough
2016	Queniborough
2017	Queniborough
2018	Queniborough
2019	British Shoe Corporation
2020	League suspended (Note: Coronavirus pandemic forced all formal competitive sporting activities to be suspended.)
2021	Soft Touch
2022	Grantham
2023	Evington Lions
2024	Rothley Park
2025	Syston Town
2026	Barrow Town

== Performance by season from 2013 (Division 1) ==
Key
Gold	Champions
Blue	Left League
Red	Relegated

Performance by season, from 2013
Club	2013	2014	2015	2016	2017	2018	2019	2020	2021	2022	2023	2024	2025	2026
Afghan Strikers									4	4				
Ashby Carington	3	6	5	5	5							9		
Barkby United	5	8	9								9		7	6
Barrow Town											4	5	5	1
Barrowby	10													
Belton Park	6	11												
Belvoir			3	6							2	3	6	
Billesdon				7	6									
Bingham							7		8	7				
Bottesford	8	10												
British Shoe Corporation						2	1		2					
Buckminster (Note: Buckminster entered into a merger after the 2014 season and became Buckminster & Barrowby.)	1	9												
Egerton Park				4	4	8								
Evington Lions							3			5	1			
Empingham	2	5	7			5								
Frisby, Hoby & Rotherby	12													
Grantham		3	5							1			4	
Harlaxton									3	3				
Hinckley Town				3	2	4	5		6					
Houghton-on-the-Hill		1	2	2	3	3	2		5	8				
Houghton Stars														5
Illston Abey									7	6	7	2		
Kinoulton	9													
Leicester University Staff											10			
Oadby Royals											5	7	2	2
Pickwell, Leesthorpe & Somerby	11													
Queniborough			1	1	1	1	4							
Quorn													9	
Rothley Park							6				3	1	3	4
Sileby Town	4	4	8	8		7	8					6	8	7
Soft Touch									1	2				
Sproxton			10											
Syston Town					8	9					6	4	1	3
Thorpe Arnold						6								8
Woolsthorpe by Belvoir	7	7	6											
Wreake Nomads											8	8		
References								(Note: Coronavirus pandemic forced all formal competitive sporting activities to be suspended.)						
