= Cherangany Constituency =

Constituency in Trans Nzoia County, Kenya

Cherangany Constituency (also spelled Cherangani Constituency), comprises the larger Trans Nzoia East District; otherwise known as Cherangani Sub-County, with an approximate area of 556.9 square km. It is an electoral constituency in Kenya, which was established/created for the 1988 general election.

It comprises seven county assembly wards, each electing a member of the county assembly (MCA) for the Trans-Nzoia County Assembly.

It is one of five constituencies in Trans-Nzoia County. The constituency was established for the 1988 Kenyan general election. Prior to the 1988 Kenyan general election, it was known as Kitale East Constituency, and was represented in the national assembly by Hon Masinde Muliro and earlier on by Hon Fred Gumo.

Hon Muliro was narrowly re-elected in the infamous 1988 (Public Queue Voting), despite mass rigging elsewhere. Immediately, his election was nullified and he lost the ensuing by-election to a Kalenjin newcomer Hon Kirwa.

== Members of Parliament ==
Elections	MP	Party	Notes
1988	Masinde Muliro	KANU	The victory of Masinde Muliro was nullified after John Kirwa Rotich successfully lodged an election petition. Prior to the election, the boundary redistribution adds one seat to Trans Nzoia district, resulting into the remapping of Kitale East and renaming.
1989	Kipruto Arap Kirwa	KANU	By-election occasioned by the nullification of Cherangany Constituency election.
1992	Kipruto Arap Kirwa	KANU	The First multi-party elections after the repeal of section 2A of the constitution of Kenya.
1997	Kipruto Arap Kirwa	KANU	
2002	Kipruto Arap Kirwa	NARC	KANU rule ended when the NARC swept into power with Mwai Kibaki as the new president.
2007	Joshua Serem Kutuny	ODM	
2013	Wesley Kipchumba Korir	Independent	The first election held under the new constitution of Kenya (2010), President Uhuru Muigai Kenyatta was elected the fourth president of the Republic of Kenya.
2017	Joshua Serem Kutuny	JP	
2022	Patrick Barasa Simiyu	DAP–K	Dr Ruto was elected as the fifth president of the Republic of Kenya on this general election.

== Wards ==
Ward	Registered voters
Cherang'any/Suwerwa Ward	16,734
Kaplamai Ward	13,319
Chepsiro/Kiptoror Ward	11,725
Sinyerere Ward	11,603
Sitatunga Ward	13,603
Motosiet/Nzoia Ward	15,528
Makutano Ward	9,318
Cherangany Constituency	91,830
*September 2022
