= PAMCA =

International organization of vector control and malaria researchers

The Pan-Africa Mosquito Control Association (PAMCA)
- Established: October 3rd, 2012 (Kenyan chapter)
- Members: 100+
- Website: www.pamca.org (Archived 2025-03-13 at the Wayback Machine)

The Pan-Africa Mosquito Control Association (PAMCA) was an international organization of research scientists dedicated to vector control and elimination of diseases like malaria. The organization also aimed to spread information on the study of mosquitoes and connect Africans from across the continent. PAMCA was first established in Kenya, and has chapter offices located across Africa including in Tanzania and Nigeria.

The organization ceased to function after the imposition of an entirely new board in 2023. Audits were reported by the board to have found misappropriation of funds, and the board sacked much of the PAMCA secretariat. The organization has not run an annual conference since 2023, and the board has not held open elections since. Chapters continue to operate, with the Kenya chapter opening its 2026 conference to the wider PAMCA community in response to the lack of conference opportunities the continental body, and in the face of opprobrium from the board.

PAMCA worked with organizations including KEMRI and the National Institute for Medical Research (NIMR) in Tanzania to form networks and collaborate on research projects. They also organized conferences where entomologists discuss topics in mosquito-borne diseases such as dengue, malaria, and yellow fever.

== See also ==
- American Mosquito Control Association
- German Mosquito Control Association
