= Saboti Constituency =

Electoral constituency in Kenya

Saboti Constituency is an electoral constituency in Kenya. It is one of five constituencies in Trans-Nzoia County. The constituency was established for the 1988 election.

== Members of Parliament ==
Elections.	MP	Party	Notes
1988	Wafula Wabuge	KANU	One-party system.
1992	Michael Wamalwa Kijana	Ford-Kenya	
1997	Michael Wamalwa Kijana	Ford-Kenya	
2002	Michael Wamalwa Kijana	NARC	Kijana died in 2003.
2003	Davies Wafula Nakitare	NARC	He won the by-election by defeating Eugene Wamalwa
2007	Eugene Wamalwa	PNU	
2013	David Lazaro Wafula	New Ford Kenya	
2017	Caleb Amisi Luyai	ODM	
2022	Caleb Amisi Luyai	ODM	

== Wards ==
Wards
Ward	Registered Voters	Local Authority
Hospital	5,876	Kitale municipality
Kibomet	1,257	Kitale municipality
Kiminini	16,106	Nzoia county
Kinyoro	5,966	Nzoia county
Kipsongo	6,719	Kitale municipality
Kisawai	5,321	Nzoia county
Lessos	1,670	Kitale municipality
Machewa	11,537	Nzoia county
Masaba	4,852	Kitale municipality
Matisi	4,766	Nzoia county
Milimani	3,549	Kitale municipality
Mumia	2,355	Kitale municipality
Saboti	6,198	Nzoia county
Sokoni	3,809	Kitale municipality
Tuwani	3,073	Kitale municipality
Waitaluk	14,228	Nzoia county
Webuye	1,027	Kitale municipality
Total	98,309	
*September 2005.
