= German Mosquito Control Association =

German organisation

- Kommunale Aktionsgemeinschaft zur Bekämpfung der Schnakenplage (KABS)
- Abbreviation: GMCA
- Formation: 1976; 50 years ago
- Founded at: Speyer
- Purpose: Conducts insecticide operations
- Region served: Upper Rhine
- President: Hartwig Rihm
- Scientific director: Dirk Reichle
- Board of directors: Klaus Horst, Marcus Schaile
- Volunteers: 250
- Website: Webpage KABS

The German Mosquito Control Association, or GMCA, (German: Kommunale Aktionsgemeinschaft zur Bekämpfung der Schnakenplage, or KABS — literally "Communal Stock Company for Combating Mosquito Infestation") conducts insecticide operations in the mosquito-infested floodplains of the Upper Rhine between Bingen and Offenburg. The work is carried out by helicopter and by backpack-sprayers.

== Technology ==
The German Mosquito Control Association is an association founded in 1976, with its seat in Speyer (Germany), by 98 bodies (towns, parishes, counties including Baden-Wuerttemberg, 2013 figure) along the upper Rhine to combat the problem of mosquitoes in the area. Of the 33 species found in the upper Rhine area over 80% are Aedes vexans. It is not uncommon to find 50,000 Aedes eggs in a single square meter of river bank in a flood plain area. KABS employees carry out mosquito control on a 300 km stretch of the Rhine between Bingen and Offenburg over an area of around six thousand square kilometers. They exclusively use a protein produced by Bacillus thuringiensis israelensis (BTI). This work is carried out, depending on the current water levels, accessibility of the terrain and statutory requirements, either on foot or by helicopter. In both cases the biologically active ingredient, which is not allowed to contain living bacteria, is applied in areas of water where the larvae breed. The agent must then be ingested by the larvae, as only then is it activated and leads to a breakup of intestinal cells, and thus extremely selectively kills the organisms.

== Distribution ==
The active substance is mixed with water and distributed with a backpack sprayer by workers on foot, or applied as an ice granulate from the air by helicopter. In 2007, 260 tons of the agent were spread by the two available helicopters and 250 helpers, on 84 action days of which 47 were supported by helicopter. This involved 33,000 working hours and 270,000 kilometers travelled. At a cost of €400,000 annually, the result is a reduction of the mosquito population by 99% compared to untreated areas. The time of application is critical for the efficiency of the treatment. Mosquitoes lay their eggs in hollows above the normal water level, and they are activated when flood levels are reached. Treatment must follow within a week.

In addition, residents of the KABS areas are supplied with Culinex tablets free of charge in order to treat smaller bodies of water such as rainwater tanks and garden ponds which do not contain fish. A single barrel can be a source of several hundred mosquitoes.

== Association ==
The founding president of the association was Paul Schädler (district administrator and later president of district government, 1930-2025), founding scientific director of KABS was Norbert Becker until 2019, now Dirk Reichle. It is financed by subscription (membership fees of the 98 affiliated municipal areas). For a city such as Wiesbaden (population 570,000) this means a fee of €45,000 per year.

== International activity ==
KABS also makes its expertise internationally available. Under its English name of German Mosquito Control Association it supports the world-wide mosquito control programme of the WHO and is member of the World Mosquito Control Association.

== Current developments ==
As flood protection is becoming ever more prevalent, the near future will see an increase in low-lying land. These planned flood areas will be further breeding ground for mosquitoes and will require additional effort which will probably require a third helicopter.

== See also ==
- American Mosquito Control Association
- Pan-Africa Mosquito Control Association

== Literature ==
- Norbert Becker, Paul Glaser, Hermann Magin: Biologische Stechmückenbekämpfung am Oberrhein, (Festschrift) 20 Jahre Kommunale Aktionsgemeinschaft zur Bekämpfung der Schnakenplage, 1996, ISBN 3-00-000584-6 (Biological Gnat Control on the Upper Rhine (publication) 20 years of a communal action association to combat the gnat plague, 1996)
- Norbert Becker: Biological control of mosquitoes: management of the Upper Rhine mosquito population as a model programme in Jørgen Eilenberg, Heikki M. T. Hokkanen (eds.): An ecological and societal approach to biological control, Springer, 2006, p. 227–245, ISBN 978-1-4020-4320-8 (Print) ISBN 978-1-4020-4401-4 (Online)
