= Innocent Wafula =

Ugandan footballer (born 1998)

Personal information
- Full name: Innocent Esimu Wafula
- Date of birth: 1 April 1998 (age 28)
- Place of birth: Busia, Uganda
- Height: 1.78 m (5 ft 10 in)
- Position: Defender

Team information
- Current team: KCCA FC
- Number: 30

Senior career*
Years	Team	Apps	(Gls)
2014	Chemilil Sugar F.C.	27	(4)
2015–2018	Gor Mahia	133	(23)
2019–2020	Vipers SC	4	(1)
2021	Mbarara City FC		(1)
2021–	KCCA FC		

International career^{‡}
2021–	Uganda	1	(0)
- * Club domestic league appearances and goals as of 14:48, 10 September 2021 (UTC) ‡ National team caps and goals as of 10 September 2021

Innocent Esimu Wafula (born 1 April 1998) is a Ugandan footballer who plays as a defender for TJ\HE Ugandan Premier League club, KCCA FC, and the Uganda national team.

== Club career ==
Wafula joined Chemelil Sugar in 2014 and made his debut against Muhoroni Youth on 22 February 2014. Chemelil Sugar won 2–0 and Wafula made both assists. He scored his first goal for Chemelil Sugar against Tusker on 23 April 2014 at Ruaraka Stadium Nairobi.

Wafula joined Gor Mahia in 2015 from Chemelil Sugar. In his debut with the club against KCB he scored and the match ended 1–0. In January 2017 he signed a new two-year contract deal at Gor Mahia. On 17 September 2017, Wafula scored a memorable goal for Gor Mahia against SoNy Sugar at Nyayo National Stadium and Gor Mahia unprecedented the 15th Kenyan Premier League title thus taking it for the third successive year.

Wafula joined Vipers SC in January 2019 and signed a three-year deal.,

Wafula joined Mbarara City FC in January 2021 from Vipers SC on a one-year contract. He made his debut on 13 April 2021 against MYDA.

On 24 August 2021, Wafula signed a one-year contract with KCCA FC.

== International career ==
Wafula made his international debut for Uganda national team on 6 September 2021 against Mali during 2022 World Cup Qualifiers when he came in as a substitute replacing Emmanuel Okwi in the 69th minute. The match was played in St Mary's Stadium-Kitende and ended 0–0.

== Personal life ==
Wafula was born to the late Bwire Ogutu and Mary Omoding of Busia District.

== Honours ==
=== Club ===
Gor Mahia

- Kenyan Premier League: 2015, 2016, 2018
- Kenyan Super Cup: 2015, 2017
- KPL Top 8 Cup: 2015
