= Masinde Muliro =

Kenyan politician (1922–1992)

The Honorable Henry Pius Masinde Muliro E.B.S.
- Born: Henry Pius Masinde Muliro; 24 May 1922; Matili, Western Kenya, East Africa Protectorate
- Died: 14 August 1992 (aged 70); Embakasi, Nairobi, Kenya
- Burial place: Sibanga, Trans Nzoia, Kenya.
- Education: University of Cape Town; BA in Education
- Occupations: Politician, educator
- Years active: 1957—1992
- Organisation: Parliament of Kenya
- Title: Member of Parliament from Kitale East Constituency; Trans Nzoia County, Kenya
- Predecessor: Fredrick Fidelis Omulo Gumo
- Successor: Kipruto Rono Arap Kirwa
- Political party: FORD (since 1992)
- Other political affiliations: KANU (before 1992)
- Spouse: Mama Marcia Muliro (m. 1953; until death of husband 1992)

Henry Pius Masinde Muliro (June 30, 1922 – August 14, 1992) was a Kenyan politician from the Bukusu sub-tribe of the larger Abaluhya people of western Kenya. He was one of the central figures in the shaping of the political landscape in Kenya. An anti-colonial activist, he campaigned for the restoration of multi-party democracy in Kenya in his later years.

== Early life ==
Henry Pius Masinde Muliro was born in Matili village, in the Kimilili area of Kenya, the son of Muliro Kisingilie and his wife Makinia. His farmer father was a Roman Catholic, and after his parents died, he was brought up by an older stepbrother, Aibu Naburuk. He undertook his elementary and secondary school studies in Kenya and Uganda, He attended several mission schools run by Catholics, including St. Peter's College in Tororo, Uganda. He joined the University of Cape Town in South Africa in 1949, enrolling for a Bachelor of Arts degree in History, Philosophy and Education. He graduated in 1953 with a degree in arts and education. In 1954, he returned home with his South African wife, Marcia. He taught for a while at a government school. In 1957, he quit his job to join politics. His early political and social ideas were formed when he was at the University of Cape Town.

== Political career ==
In 1948, Muliro joined the Kenya African Union (KAU), a body formed to champion the interests of Africans in colonial Kenya. When he quit teaching in 1957, he contested the Nyanza North Legislative Council seat, which was then held by W.W.W. Awori (the elder brother of the former Kenyan vice president Moody Awori). Muliro won the election. Among his fellow legislators were Daniel arap Moi representing the Rift Valley, Tom Mboya representing the Nairobi area, Bernard Mate representing the Central Province, Ronald Ngala representing the Coast Province, James Nzau Muimi representing the Eastern Province, Lawrence Oguda representing Nyanza South, and Oginga Odinga representing Nyanza Central. In 1958, Muliro formed the Kenya National Party with the support of nine Legco members. He later dissolved his party to join the Kenya African Democratic Union (KADU). He was subsequently appointed minister of commerce just before Kenya gained independence in 1963. Muliro worked in various positions in later governments but was frequently on the wrong side of President Jomo Kenyatta.

After Kenyatta's death, he vied for the Kitale East seat in the 1979 general election, but the new president, Daniel Arap Moi, seeking to assert his authority, ensured his old ally Muliro was rigged out in Kitale East in favor of ex-Mayor Fred Gumo. He remained in the cold between 1979 and 1984; he was again rigged out in the 1983 snap election by the KANU party. However, in the ensuing 1984 by-election, after Gumo’s win was invalidated due to ballot box stuffing, Muliro narrowly won the resulting by-election against a Kalenjin candidate, Hon. Joseph Yego in an election marred by widespread election rigging and malpractices.

He served as the Kitale East Constituency MP until 1988, when the constituency was split up and he contested the newly created Cherangany Constituency parliamentary seat in the infamous 1988 Mlolongo election. He narrowly won the Cherangany Constituency parliamentary seat in the 1988 election, but his election was immediately nullified. At the 1989 by-election, a newcomer, Kalenjin Hon Kipruto Arap Kirwa defeats him.

== Multi-party campaign ==
In 1989, Muliro teamed up with Kenneth Matiba, Charles Rubia, Martin Shikuku, Phillip Gachoka and Oginga Odinga to form FORD (Forum for restoration of democracy), a pressure-group agitating for a return to pluralist politics. After violent clashes pitting FORD supporters against police and government supporters, the KANU government accepted multi-partyism in 1991. FORD became a party with Muliro as its vice chairman.

Disagreements soon cropped up with two main rivals Oginga Odinga and Kenneth Matiba each wanting to run for presidency and not wanting to listen to reason. It was Shortly after this that Muliro left for London for a fundraising mission for the newly formed Ford political party. It was to be an ill-fated trip: on his return, upon his arrival at the Nairobi airport on the morning of August 14, 1992, he collapsed and died. The controversy over his death was heightened by the absence of an official post mortem. Muliro was buried on his rural farm in Sibanga area of Kenya.

The party, then split into two factions after Muliro died due to a disagreement on who was to run for the presidency against President Moi. Kenneth Matiba and Martin Shikuku claiming that they are the real owners of Ford splitting to form Ford Asili and Odinga and others forming Ford Kenya. Had Masinde Muliro not died, the original FORD would have remained united and possibly would have removed president Moi in 1992.

== Personal life ==
He married Mama Marcia Muliro in 1953.

The Masinde Muliro University of Science and Technology in Kakamega is named for him.
