= Kwanza Constituency =

Constituency in Trans-Nzoia County

Kwanza
- constituency for the Parliament of Kenya
- Kwanza Constituency within Trans Nzoia County

- Trans-Nzoia County within Kenya
- County: Trans-Nzoia
- Population: 203,821
- Area: 465 km^{2} (179.5 sq mi)

Current constituency
- Number of members: 1
- Party: FORD Kenya
- Member of Parliament: Ferdinand Kevin Wanyonyi
- Wards: 4

Kwanza Constituency is an electoral constituency in Kenya. The constituency has four wards, all of which elect member of county assembly for the Trans-Nzoia County Assembly. It is one of five constituencies in Trans-Nzoia County. The constituency was established for the 1988 elections. After the promulgation of the new constitution in 2010, the larger constituency was split into two constituencies, and Endebess Constituency was created out of it.

== Members of Parliament ==
Elections	MP	Party	Notes
1988	Dr Noah Mahalang’ang’a Wekesa	KANU	One-party system.
1992	George Kapten	Ford-K	The first election following the repeal of Section 2A of the constitution, this made Kenya a multi-party state. The change enabled the introduction of term limits to the presidency.
1997	George Kapten	Ford-K	
1999	Dr Noah Mahalang’ang’a Wekesa	KANU	By-elections following the death of Hon George Kapten.
2002	Dr Noah Mahalang’ang’a Wekesa	NARC	KANU rule ended when the NARC swept into power with Mwai Kibaki as the new president.
2007	Dr Noah Mahalang’ang’a Wekesa	PNU	
2013	Ferdinand Kevin Wanyonyi	Ford-K	The first election held under the new constitution of Kenya (2010), President Uhuru Muigai Kenyatta was elected the fourth president of the Republic of Kenya. The constituency was re-mapped and Endebess was curved out of the larger Kwanza to create a new constituency.
2017	Ferdinand Kevin Wanyonyi	Ford-K	
2022	Ferdinand Kevin Wanyonyi	Ford-K	Dr Ruto was elected as the fifth president of the Republic of Kenya on this general election.

== Wards ==
Wards
Ward	Registered Voters
Kapomboi	21,887
Keiyo	14,929
Kwanza	21,365
Bidii	17,371
Total	75,552
*9 August 2022.
