= Michael Kijana Wamalwa =

8th Vice President of Kenya (1944–2003)

Honourable Michael Christopher Kijana Wamalwa E.G.H.
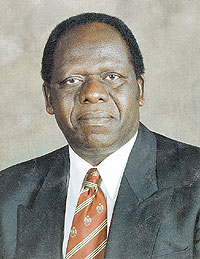

8th Vice President of Kenya
- In office 3 January 2003 – 23 August 2003
- President: Mwai Kibaki
- Preceded by: Musalia Mudavadi
- Succeeded by: Moody Awori

Personal details
- Born: Michael Christopher Kijana Wamalwa; 25 November 1944 Sosio, Kenya
- Died: 23 August 2003 (aged 58) Hampstead, London, England
- Party: National Rainbow Coalition
- Spouse: Yvonne Namibia Wamalwa
- Relatives: Eugene Ludovic Wamalwa, brother
- Education: Strathmore School; King's College London; London School of Economics; Lincoln's Inn
- Occupation: Politician
- Profession: Lawyer; Teacher
- Cabinet: Minister of Home Affairs

Michael Christopher Kijana Wamalwa (25 November 1944 – 23 August 2003) was a renowned Kenyan politician who at the time of his death was serving as the eighth Vice-President of Kenya.

== Early life ==
Michael Christopher Kijana Wamalwa was born in Sosio, a village near Kimilili in Kenya's Bungoma district. He was the son of an influential MP, William Wamalwa. He went on to become head boy and the best debater at his secondary school, Strathmore School. He won a national essay competition and represented Kenya at a UN student forum. In 1965, he was awarded a Commonwealth scholarship to study law at King's College London, graduating with a third-class honours degree in Law in 1968 before going on to the London School of Economics. He was called to the bar at Lincoln's Inn in 1970.

He returned to Kenya that same year and taught law at the University of Nairobi. Some of the students he taught there would later become his political allies and opponents. During this period, he also ran the family farms in the Kitale area, as well as holding several prominent government positions, including general manager of the Kenya Stone Mining Company and director of the Kenya-Japan Association.

== Politics ==
Wamalwa's first foray into politics came in Kenya's 1974 parliamentary election. Just 30, his opponents painted him as too young and from too wealthy a background to effectively represent his constituency. His campaign was flashy: it included the use of an aircraft and extravagant public rallies. He finally won a seat in 1979, as a protégé of Masinde Muliro.

In the run-up to the first multi-party elections in post-independence Kenya, in 1992, Wamalwa identified with the Ford Kenya faction of the FORD opposition movement. He was elected MP for Saboti Constituency, as well as the First Vice Chairman of his party. In January 1994, he became chairman of Ford Kenya following the death of Oginga Odinga. Wamalwa went on to contest the 1997 Kenyan elections as a leader of the opposition, but he fared badly and came only fourth in the nationwide tally of votes.

== Political life ==
Alongside Tom Mboya, Ronald Ngala and PLO Lumumba, Wamalwa was a gifted Kenyan orator.

He sacrificed his riches to assist the poor and needy by paying school fees and assisting in raising living standards of the poor. He started the Touch Africa foundation with a view toward empowering youths, the poor, and the needy to realize their dreams.

He was a member of Parliament (MP) for Saboti Constituency, in Trans-Nzoia District, Rift Valley Province. His home town was Kitale.

Perhaps uniquely in Kenyan history, he managed to secure votes without tribal/ethnic chauvinism.

He was thought of as an automatic successor of President Mwai Kibaki.

=== 2002 elections ===
In the run up to the 2002 general elections, Wamalwa closed ranks with fellow opposition stalwarts in a bid to wrestle KANU out of power. KANU had been the ruling party since independence. He joined fellow 1997 presidential candidates Charity Kaluki Ngilu and Mwai Kibaki and formed an alliance. They were later joined by Raila Odinga who had also contested in the 1997 presidential elections, and Kalonzo Musyoka who jumped ship from KANU after all indications proved that president Daniel Toroitich Arap Moi had settled on his predecessor's son Uhuru Kenyatta as his heir to the presidency. This was seen in bad light by many KANU stalwarts who joined Musyoka and Odinga into the broad opposition alliance that formed the National Rainbow coalition (NARC) that swept KANU from power. Mwai Kibaki was elected president and in turn rewarded Wamalwa with the Vice Presidency for his contribution to his presidential win.

== Failing health ==
In late 2002, during the election campaign, Mwai Kibaki was seriously injured in a car accident and was flown to London for treatment. There he was visited by Wamalwa, who also fell ill and had to be treated, supposedly for kidney problems. This was apparently the forerunner of further illness because he was taken ill again in mid-2003 and was once again treated in London.

He briefly recovered, and returned to Kenya to marry Yvonne Nambia in a sumptuous ceremony; it was said that he proposed in Shakespearean English, and arrived at church in a vintage Ford, wearing a morning coat.

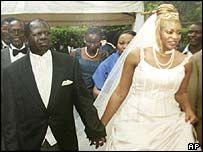
Wamalwa with Yvonne Nambia at their wedding

Just two months after the wedding, Wamalwa returned to the Royal Free Hospital for another check-up, leading to widespread speculation that his health was worse than doctors had been letting on. He was never to recover. He died on the morning of 23 August 2003, and was given a state burial at his farm in Kitale Milimani.

The cause of Wamalwa's illness and death has been disputed, and official statements from the government did not specify a particular cause, though some claim that he died of HIV/AIDS. Various Kenyan newspapers listed gout, a chest infection, or pancreatitis as the reasons for his illness, while the British magazine The Economist reported his death had been caused by complications relating to AIDS.
