= Endebess =

Endebess, Kenya
- Location in Kenya
- Coordinates: 1°4′0″N 34°51′0″E
- Country: Kenya
- County: Trans-Nzoia County

Endebess is a small town that houses the headquarters for the division in Trans-Nzoia County, Kenya. The town is located 17 kilometers west of Kitale, the location of the county headquarters.

Endebess is one of the towns nearest to Mount Elgon, and features accommodation for those interested in hiking in the national park; the town is 4 kilometers from the park's Chorlim Gate.

Endebess was among many areas hit by post-election violence in early 2008, and hosted a camp for internally displaced persons after the violence subsided.
