= Turkwel River =

River flowing on the border of Kenya and Uganda

Coordinates: 3°06′17″N 36°05′51″E

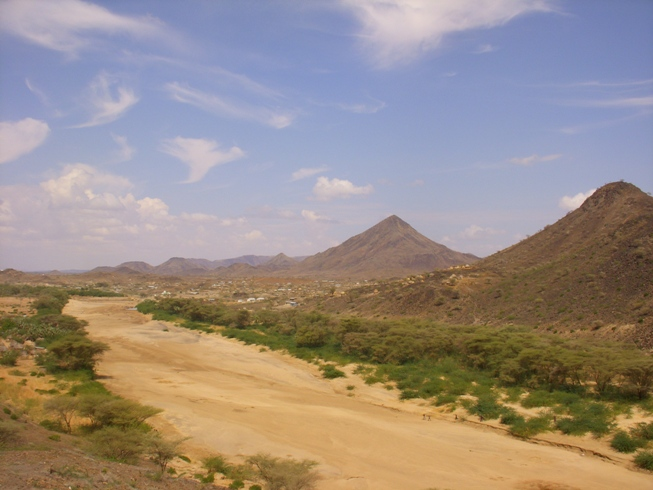
Dry riverbed of the Turkwel river, just outside Lodwar town in Turkana County, Kenya

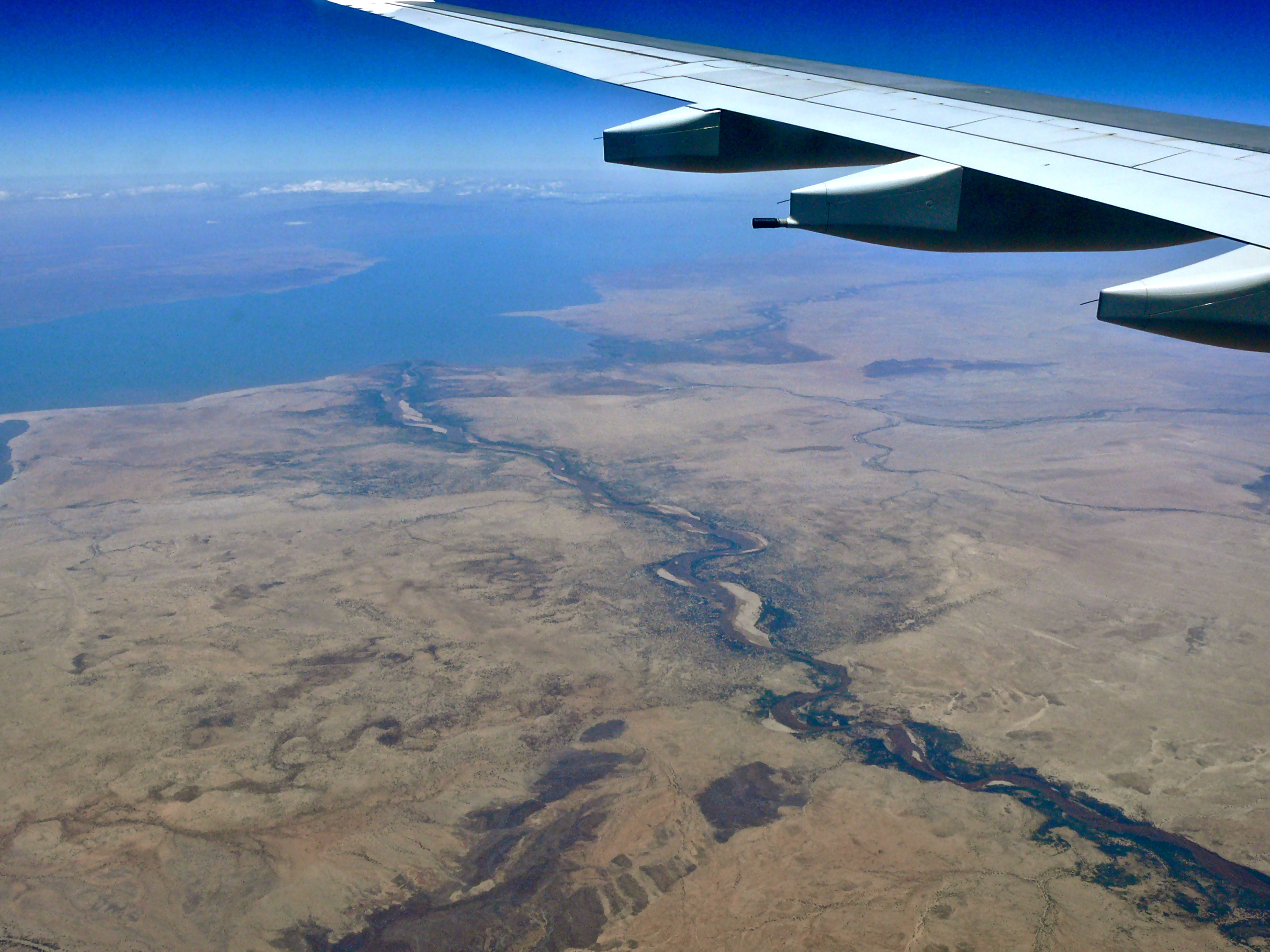
Seen entering Lake Turkana

The Turkwel River (sometimes spelled Turkwell River) is a river flowing from Mount Elgon on the border of Kenya and Uganda to Lake Turkana. The river is called the Suam River from its source to the border at Turkana County of Kenya. The name Turkwel is derived from the Turkana name for the river, Tir-kol, which means a river that "withstands the wilderness". The Turkwel begins on the lush green slopes of Mount Elgon and the Cherangani Hills, then traverses the Southern Turkana Plains, crosses the Loturerei Desert near Lodwar and empties into the world's largest desert lake, Lake Turkana. The river's flow is seasonal, flash floods in the rainy season can occur at times.

The controversial Turkwel Dam was built by the Kenyan government from 1986 to 1991 with the help of France. The plan was to harness the waters of the Turkwel. The project was initially supposed to cost KSh 4 billion...KSh 20 billion, but ended up costing more than KSh. 20 billion. The dam partially filled the Turkwel Gorge and created the Turkwel Gorge Reservoir.

== Anthropology ==
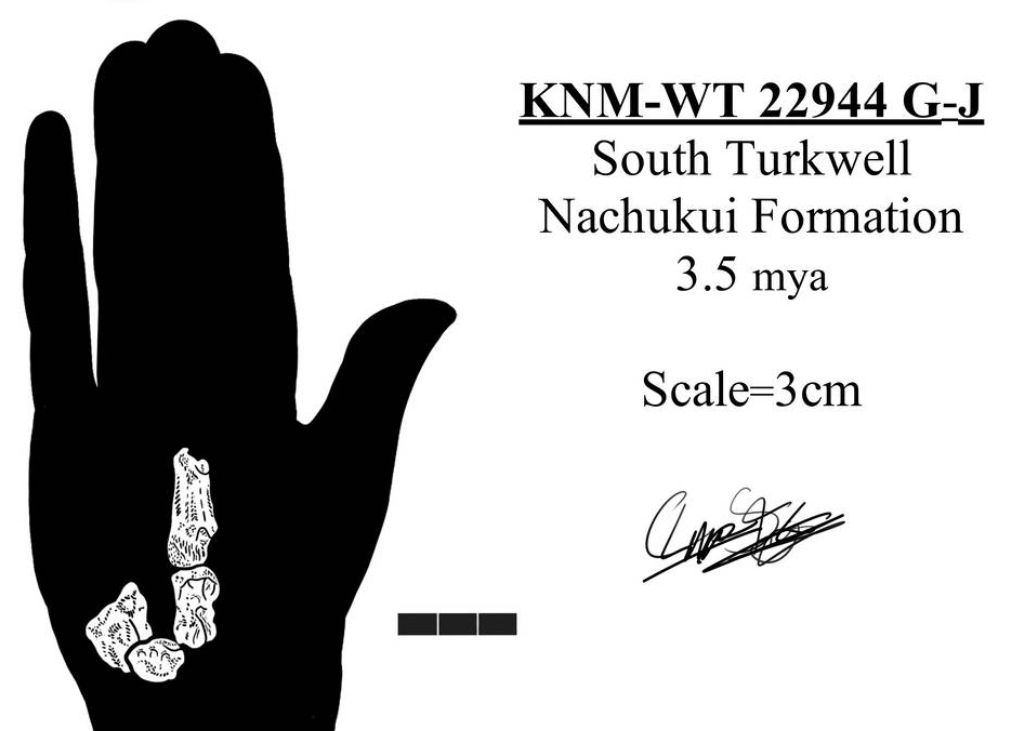
Hominin hand remains from South Turkwel.

In 1999, fossils reported from south of the river were assigned to Australopithecus sp. based on similarities with A. afarensis, although they were not the same. They were discovered by a multinational team in 1990 and brought to the National Museums of Kenya. These fossils include a metacarpal, capitate, hamate, lunate, pedal phalanx, mandibular fragment, and dental remains. They lacked the suspension and climbing capabilities in the hand and wrist of contemporaries, but had heavily muscled forearms that were adept at certain apelike types of precision gripping based on the suggested rotary capacity. These were assigned KNM-WT 22944 G through J, and they are 3.5 mya old from the Nachukui Formation.
