= Trans-Nzoia County =

County of Kenya

Coordinates: 1.1°N 34.95°E

- County
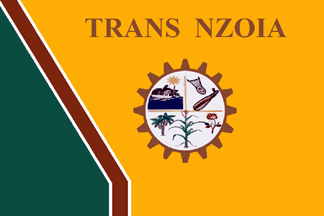
- Flag
- Motto: Unity in Diversity
- Location in Kenya
- Country: Kenya
- County Government: 4 March 2013
- Capital: Kitale

Government
  - Body: County Government of Trans Nzoia
  - Governor: George Natembeya (Democratic Action Party of Kenya (DAP-K))

Area
  - Total: 2,469.9 km^{2} (953.6 sq mi)
  - Land: 2,495.5 km^{2} (963.5 sq mi)

Population (2019)
  - Total: 990,341
  - Density: 396.85/km^{2} (1,027.8/sq mi)
- Time zone: UTC+3 (EAT)
- Website: transnzoia.go.ke

Trans-Nzoia County is a county in the former Rift Valley Province, Kenya, located between the Nzoia River and Mount Elgon, 380 km northwest of Nairobi. At its centre is the town of Kitale which is the county capital and largest town. It is bordered by the Republic of Uganda to the west, Bungoma and Kakamega Counties to the south, West Pokot County to the east, and Elgeyo Marakwet and Uasin Gishu Counties to the southeast. Trans Nzoia covers an area of 2495.5 square kilometres. The county has a cool and temperate climate, with daytime temperatures ranging from 23.4 °C to 29.2 °C and nighttime temperatures from 11.0 °C to 13.5 °C. It receives moderate rainfall, making it suitable for agriculture

Earliest known written records about the region show that Trans Nzoia was inhabited by the Sabaot people who, by the time of the arrival of colonial settlers, had died or left the district, some had died of illness, others had been killed in intertribal wars with the Suk (Pokot), and the remainder had mostly gone off in the direction of Ravine, though some had gone up the Elgon. After independence, many of the farms vacated by white settlers were bought by individuals from other ethnic groups in Kenya. Kitale, its capital town, is now majorly Luhya with inhabitants from other tribes in Kenya occupying almost less than 1% of the population.

The county is largely agricultural with both large scale and small scale wheat, maize and dairy farming. The county is referred to as the bread basket of Kenya for its role in food production in the country. The majority of its inhabitants are however generally poor.

Trans Nzoia is one of Kenya's forty-seven counties, established under the 2010 constitution. It is locally governed by the County Government of Trans Nzoia. The County Government Act allows the County Government to further decentralize its functions and services below the village with the approval of the Trans-Nzoia County Assembly. Governors are elected every five years in the Kenya General Elections. George Natembeya is the current governor since 2022, succeeding Patrick Khaemba who was the first governor of Trans Nzoia and led the county from 2013 to 2022.

== Physiographic and natural conditions ==
Trans Nzoia County features predominantly flat terrain with gentle undulations rising towards the Cherang'any Hills in the east and Mount Elgon in the northwest. Mount Elgon, shared with Bungoma County and Uganda, is Kenya's second-highest peak and a significant environmental and wildlife conservation site. The county's altitude varies from 1,660 meters in Sikhendu Ward to 4,299 meters at Mount Elgon's peak.

The county is home to 15 rivers, including Sabwani, Rongai, Noigamaget, Suam, Kaptega, and Losourwa, which contribute to the Nzoia River system draining into Lake Victoria and Lake Turkana. These rivers are crucial for domestic use, small-scale irrigation, and have potential for hydroelectric power generation. However, they face threats from human activities such as encroachment and agriculture, which impact their catchment areas.

Trans Nzoia's forests, primarily located in Mount Elgon and Cherang'any Hills, are essential for the county's climate and water catchment. Human activities have reduced forest cover from 17% in 2013 to 15.1%, posing challenges for the local environment.

The county enjoys a cool, temperate climate with mean maximum daytime temperatures ranging from 23.4 °C to 29.2 °C and mean minimum nighttime temperatures between 11.0 °C and 13.5 °C. The highest temperature, about 34.2 °C, occurs in February, and the lowest, around 6.5 °C, is recorded in January. Annual rainfall varies from 1,000mm to 1,700mm, distributed across three main seasons: long rains (March–May), intermediate rains (June–August), and short rains (October–December). The long and intermediate rainy seasons are more reliable for agriculture. However, recent climate changes have led to increased occurrences of droughts, dry spells, and floods.

== Demographics and sub-divisions ==
Trans Nzoia comprises five sub-counties: Kiminini, Saboti, Endebess, Kwanza, and Cherangany, which are further divided into 25 wards. As of the 2019 Census, the population was 990,341, consisting of 489,107 males, 501,206 females, and 28 intersex individuals. The county had 223,808 households with an average size of 4.4 people per household.

Kitale serves as the county's administrative center and main commercial hub. Other significant market centers include Kiminini, Kachibora, Saboti, and Endebess. The county is highly diverse, with residents from nearly all of Kenya's 44 ethnic groups, including the predominant Luhya and Kalenjin communities, as well as Kikuyu, Kisii, Luo, Teso, and Turkana among others.

Local authorities (councils)
Authority	Type	Population*	Urban pop.*
Kitale	Municipality	86,055	63,245
Nzoia	County	489,607	0
Total	-	575,662	63,245
* 1999 census. Source:

Historically a white highland, Trans Nzoia's economy is primarily driven by agriculture, benefiting from fertile soils and favorable climatic conditions. It is renowned for large-scale maize production, earning it the nickname "Kenya’s breadbasket." Other significant economic activities include trade and tourism, supported by the presence of Mt. Elgon and Cherangany Hills, which are part of Kenya's five water towers. The county boasts both indigenous and exotic forests, contributing to a tree cover of 17%, surpassing the national target of 10%.

Strategically located, Trans Nzoia serves as a gateway to South Sudan via West Pokot and Turkana counties and to Uganda through the Suam Border. It is well-connected by major roads, including the National Trunk Road 1A, linking it to Tanzania, South Sudan, and the Kenyan capital, Nairobi. The county also has a modern airstrip and extensive road networks, enhancing its status as a regional economic hub.

Administrative divisions
Division	Population*	Urban pop.*	Headquarters
Central	147,992	42,884	Kitale
Cherang'any	152,974	0	Kachibora
Endebess	61,481	0	Endebess
Kaplamai	89,858	0	Kaplamai
Kiminini	64,685	0	Kiminini
Kwanza	88,727	0	Kwanza
Saboti	69,945	0	Saboti
Total	625,662	42,884	-
* 1999 census. Sources: , ,

Historical population
Year	Pop.	±%
1979	259,503	—
1989	393,682	+51.7%
1999	575,662	+46.2%
2009	818,757	+42.2%
2019	990,341	+21.0%

== History ==
=== Toponymy ===
Trans Nzoia County derives its name from the Nzoia River, a prominent geographical feature in the region. Here's an exploration of the toponymy related to Trans Nzoia:

1. Nzoia River: The county is named after the Nzoia River, which flows through the region. The name "Nzoia" is believed to have its origins in local dialects, though the exact etymology might vary.
2. "Trans" Prefix: The prefix "Trans" indicates "across" or "beyond" in Latin, suggesting that the name signifies "beyond the Nzoia River" or "across the Nzoia River". This term was commonly used during the colonial era to denote areas located on the other side of a prominent geographical feature.
3. Colonial Influence: During British colonial rule, the area around the Nzoia River and its surroundings were designated as "Trans Nzoia" to demarcate administrative regions. This naming convention persisted into the post-independence period, and Trans Nzoia County was formally established as an administrative unit within Kenya.
4. Historical Context: The naming of Trans Nzoia County reflects its geographical and historical significance as a region defined by the Nzoia River and its cultural, economic, and political interactions over time.

Overall, Trans Nzoia County's toponymy highlights the fusion of geographical, historical, and cultural elements that define its identity within Kenya.

=== Early Settlement and Initial Development ===
Initially, the region was dominated by natural features like Mount Elgon, the Cherangani Hills, and the Nzoia River, which marked its boundaries. Early maps, such as those depicting "Qitale," show its significance as a route for slave traders from Uganda to the coast. Kitale, now the central town of Trans Nzoia, was even used as a resting place for these traders.

An article titled "At the Sign of the World's Cross Roads: Tsetse Fly and the Trans-Nzoia" from The Field magazine in September 1919 provides a detailed account of the early settlement and the challenges faced by settlers in the Trans-Nzoia region of Kenya. It highlights the following key points:

1. Tsetse Fly Infestation: One of the significant challenges in Trans-Nzoia was the presence of the tsetse fly, which caused sleeping sickness in both humans and animals. This pest was a major obstacle to settlement and agriculture, as it affected livestock and made large areas uninhabitable.
2. Early Settlement: The article discusses the arrival of early European settlers who faced numerous hardships, including diseases, lack of infrastructure, and the remoteness of the region. Despite these challenges, the settlers were determined to develop the land.
3. Agricultural Potential: Despite the difficulties, the region was recognized for its fertile soil and potential for agriculture. The settlers worked hard to clear the land, establish farms, and introduce crops and livestock that could thrive in the environment.
4. Infrastructure Development: The article notes the gradual development of infrastructure, including roads and railways, which facilitated better access to markets and resources. This development was crucial for the economic growth of the region.
5. Community Efforts: There was a strong sense of community among the settlers, who supported each other in overcoming the various challenges. They established social and support networks to improve living conditions and promote development.
6. Government Involvement: The colonial government played a role in supporting the settlement efforts by providing resources, conducting surveys, and implementing policies to encourage more settlers to move to Trans-Nzoia.

This early period in Trans-Nzoia's history is characterized by the settlers' resilience and the collaborative efforts to transform a challenging environment into a productive agricultural region.

=== Administrative and Economic Development ===
The first formal attempts to settle Trans Nzoia began in 1913, when the government auctioned farms. However, the outbreak of World War I slowed this process, leaving many farms vacant. After the war, the Soldier Settlement Scheme in 1920-21 brought new settlers, marking the start of structured development. Despite initial hardships, including the lack of nearby banks and railheads, settlers persevered. Kitale started to emerge as an administrative and business center, and the appointment of a District Commissioner at Hoey’s Bridge facilitated governance and infrastructure development.

=== Social and Cultural Growth ===
The social fabric of Trans Nzoia began to take shape with the establishment of various institutions. The Kitale Club, founded in 1924, became a hub for social activities. Religious institutions like St. Luke's Church and a Roman Catholic Church were built, catering to the spiritual needs of the community. Medical facilities were initially scarce, with a private house serving as a hospital run by nursing sisters. Over time, the district saw the establishment of more comprehensive healthcare and educational facilities, reflecting its growing complexity and self-sufficiency.

=== Agricultural Expansion ===
Agriculture played a pivotal role in Trans Nzoia’s development. The fertile plains and favorable climate conditions made it ideal for cultivating maize, wheat, pyrethrum, coffee, and tea. The success of these crops attracted more settlers and investment. The extension of the railway to Kitale, a project championed by Governor Sir Edward Grigg, significantly boosted agricultural and economic activities by improving the transport of goods and people.

=== Environmental and Geographical Features ===
Trans Nzoia’s landscape is marked by significant geographical features that contribute to its biodiversity and agricultural productivity. Mount Elgon, with its vast base and rich natural resources, and the Cherangani Hills, known for their varied scenery and rare wildlife, form natural boundaries and habitats. These areas support diverse flora and fauna, including the rare Bongo and the Lammergeyer. The district’s altitude ranges from 6,000 to 8,000 feet, with an average annual rainfall of 48 inches, further enhancing its suitability for agriculture.

=== Key Historical Figures and Events ===
The history of Trans Nzoia is also marked by notable figures and events. Abu Bakr, an early observer, provides a vivid account of the region in the early 20th century, describing its uninhabited state and the challenges faced by early settlers. Significant visits by royalty, such as the Prince of Wales (October 1928) and Queen Elizabeth the Queen Mother (1959), highlight the district’s growing importance over time.

== Economy and industry ==
Trans Nzoia County boasts a diverse and vibrant economy, with agriculture playing a central role. The county is known for its significant contributions to Kenya's food security, primarily through large-scale maize production. To enhance this sector, the County Government of Trans Nzoia has established milling plants in Kitale Town, Endebess, and Matisi, promoting value addition to agricultural produce. Furthermore, there is a strong focus on agricultural training, with colleges disseminating modern farming technologies. The county also invests in irrigation systems in areas like Endebess, Kwanza, Saboti, Cherangani, and Kiminini to ensure a reliable water supply for crops. Mechanization is made more accessible through subsidized agricultural machinery, including tractors, ploughs, and planters, supporting farmers in maximizing their productivity.

Tourism is another growing sector in Trans Nzoia County, with initiatives aimed at improving infrastructure and diversifying the tourism experience. Efforts include the preservation and protection of key sites, the establishment of tourist information centers, and the modernization of traditional bomas at the Kitale Museum. The county is also developing new tourism products such as amusement parks and eco-tourism ventures. To attract more visitors, comprehensive tourism marketing and investment strategies are being implemented, along with the classification of tourist establishments to ensure high standards of service.

Trade and commerce are vital to the county's economy, with significant investments in market infrastructure. The County Government of Trans Nzoia is renovating existing markets and constructing new business kiosks and sanitation blocks to create a conducive environment for traders. Trade shows and exhibitions are regularly hosted to promote local products and foster business growth. Additionally, the county is enhancing cross-border trade by forming and operationalizing cross-border associations, facilitating smoother trade relations with neighboring regions.

Through these strategic initiatives, Trans Nzoia County is steadily strengthening its economic foundation, ensuring sustainable growth and development across agriculture, tourism, and trade sectors.

The county is part of the Lake Region Economic Bloc (LREB) established in 2018 to foster regional economic, industrial, social, and technological collaboration.

== Religion and culture ==
=== Religion ===
Majority of people living in Trans Nzoia County are Christians. Prominent churches in the county include Anglican (ACK), Roman Catholic, Friends (Quakers), Seven-Day Adventist (SDA), and Presbyterians. There are numerous evangelical churches among them the Deliverance, African Inland Church (AIC), Africa Gospel Church (AGC), the Redeemed Church, PEFA, Christian Church International (CCI), Full Gospel and Kenya Assemblies of God (KAG). Other faiths such as Islam and Hinduism are also professed especially in major towns.

Jainism is also practiced by Oshwals in Kitale which is a religion that prescribes a path of non-violence towards all living beings while emphasising spiritual independence and equality. The indigenous Sabaot tribe or the 'Elgon Maasai' live near Mount Elgon and are a Kalenjin sub tribe. They value their culture and guard it with pride. They are traditionally pastoralists. They used to believe that their god lived in elevated places where they could not reach such as on top of Mount Elgon or up in the sky. However, due to influence of Christianity, education and intermarriage, most of these traditions have been replaced by modern culture, a reason why the one time pastoralists are now big farmers in the region.

Religion in Trans-Nzoia County

Religion (2019 Census)	Number
Protestant	346,099
Evangelical Churches	302,598
Catholicism	203,368
African Instituted Churches	69,304
Orthodox	3,644
Other Cristian	27,154
Islam	9,930
Traditionists	1,532
Hindu	436
Other religion	7,304
No Religion/atheists	12,530
Don't know/not stated	1,434

=== Culture ===
The Kitale Film Week is an annual film festival held in Trans Nzoia. This event celebrates and promotes local and international films, providing a platform for filmmakers to showcase their work and engage with audiences. The festival often includes film screenings, workshops, panel discussions, and networking opportunities for filmmakers, industry professionals, and film enthusiasts. It aims to support the growth of the film industry in the region and foster cultural exchange through the art of cinema. It had its maiden edition in 2023.

== Major towns ==
Located between Mt. Elgon and Cherangany Hills, Kitale is the largest town and Trans Nzoia's administrative capital. Mainly an agricultural town, Kitale has recently shown a lot of economic potential, with agribusiness, real estate and commercial businesses booming the most. The town is home to over 220,000 people and as the last stop of the Kenya railway line, it is an important center for movement of goods in the North Rift.

Matisi, meaning "swampy area", is a fast growing town located in the outskirts of Kitale town along Kitale-Suam road.

Kiminini is a small yet busy town located some 22 kilometers along Kitale Webuye road. It is a significant agricultural center. St. Brigids National Girls High School is located at this town.

Maili Saba means "seven miles" in Swahili. It is located along Kitale-Kapenguria road.

Situated at the foot of Mt. Elgon, some 17 kilometers North Western side of Kitale town, Endebess is an important agricultural town, which also serves as a local administrative and commercial center for Kwanza sub county.

Kachibora is situated at the junction of Kitale-Ziwa-Eldoret road/Kitale-Kapcherop-Kapsowar road, about 30 kilometres from Kitale town. Kachibora is a fast growing agricultural town. It is the administrative headquarters of the Trans Nzoia East sub county.

== Healthcare and health facilities ==
Trans Nzoia County's healthcare system is structured into three main sectors: Medical Services, Corporate Health, and Public Health and Sanitation, each with specific roles. The County's health vision is to create a globally competitive, healthy, and productive region. Its mission focuses on developing a progressive, responsive, sustainable, technology-driven, evidence-based, and client-centered healthcare system, aiming for the highest health standards for all residents.

The County's healthcare goals include achieving high-quality, accessible, affordable, and equitable healthcare. To accomplish this, the County prioritizes several strategies, such as enhancing promotive and preventive healthcare, improving environmental health and sanitation, and strengthening community health services. Additionally, there is a focus on managing communicable diseases and neglected tropical diseases, increasing immunization coverage, enhancing reproductive, maternal, newborn, child, and adolescent health (RMNCAH) services, improving nutrition services, and expanding mental health care access.

The county also aims to increase access to curative and rehabilitative services by providing more specialized health care, strengthening emergency and referral services, and developing health infrastructure. Furthermore, the County plans to enhance health administration, management, and support services, including increasing medical supplies, bolstering the medical workforce, promoting health research and development, and advancing universal health care coverage.

The healthcare infrastructure in Trans Nzoia County includes 15 hospitals, 22 health centers, 124 dispensaries, 51 private clinics, and 2 nursing homes. The County has a total bed capacity of 673, distributed across its sub-counties, with Kiminini and Saboti having the highest capacities. However, there is a notable shortage of ICU beds, with only 8 available across the entire county.

Despite these facilities, the healthcare system faces challenges, including uneven distribution of health services, understaffing, inadequate medical equipment, and insufficient supporting infrastructure. The doctor-to-patient ratio is 1:11,363, while the nurse-to-patient ratio is 1:1,739, indicating a significant shortfall in healthcare personnel. Clinical officers and laboratory technicians are also in short supply, further straining the healthcare system.

To address these issues, the County has proposed several strategies and projects. These include completing and operationalizing the Trans Nzoia County Referral Hospital, renovating existing hospitals, expanding and equipping sub-county hospitals and rural health centers, constructing new dispensaries, and establishing a reliable drug management system. The County also plans to recruit more healthcare workers, create mobile clinics, and provide adequate resources for medical supplies. Moreover, identifying suitable sites for medical-related amenities like public mortuaries, cemeteries, and crematoriums in Saboti and Kwanza sub-counties is part of the strategic plan.

== Education ==
=== Education in Trans Nzoia County ===
The County Government of Trans Nzoia is responsible for fostering a conducive environment for quality education and vocational training, aiming to empower individuals with the skills necessary for self-employment and global competitiveness. The county's education sector encompasses early childhood development education (ECDE), vocational training, primary and secondary education, tertiary education, and adult literacy programs.

==== Early Childhood Development Education ====
The county has made significant strides in early childhood education over the years. There are 434 public ECDE centers with a total enrolment of 44,327 children. These centers are staffed by 761 teachers, resulting in a teacher-to-pupil ratio of 1:58. Additionally, there are 462 private ECDE centers catering to 28,002 children with a more favorable teacher-to-pupil ratio of 1:37. The county is focused on improving ECDE infrastructure, enhancing human resource capacity, increasing learning materials, and implementing school feeding initiatives.

==== Primary and Secondary Education ====
Trans Nzoia County has 384 public primary schools with an enrolment of 237,662 pupils and 4,742 teachers, resulting in a teacher-to-pupil ratio of 1:50. In addition, there are 218 private primary schools with 25,096 pupils and a teacher-to-pupil ratio of 1:16. The dropout, enrolment, and retention rates are key metrics monitored by the county, although specific figures are not provided.

For secondary education, there are 241 public secondary schools with a total enrolment of 106,975 students and 2,924 teachers, yielding a teacher-to-student ratio of 1:37. The county also supports vocational training centers, with 32 centers enrolling 3,200 students and employing 156 instructors.

==== Tertiary Education and Vocational Training ====
Trans Nzoia County boasts 31 accredited TVET institutions, providing a variety of educational opportunities beyond secondary school. The enrolment figures for these institutions show a higher male participation, with 7,201 males and 5,592 females enrolled in TVETs. The county also supports adult literacy through 38 centers, which have an enrolment of 1,764 learners, focusing on improving literacy rates among adults.

== Places of interest ==
Most outstanding places of interest include Mount Elgon National Park, Saiwa Swamp National Park and Kitale Nature Conservancy. Mount Elgon National Park is located approximately 11 kilometers from Kitale town. Some of the wild animals found here include elephants, buffalos, black and white colobus, giant forest hog and over 420 bird species.

Saiwa Swamp National Park is located some 27 kilometers from Kitale town towards Kitale – Kapenguria road and is good for game viewing and camping. Kitale Museum, located in the heart of Kitale town is one of the most interesting places in the county. Apart from hosting varieties of traditional artifacts, the museum is also home to different snake species as well as having one of the largest crocodile pits in Kenya.

== Sector development issues ==
The County Integrated Development Plan for Trans Nzoia County identifies several critical development issues impacting the region. These issues span across multiple sectors, including healthcare, infrastructure, agriculture, and governance, and are rooted in various systemic challenges.

Healthcare: Trans Nzoia County faces significant healthcare challenges. These include low immunization coverage, inadequate access to Reproductive, Maternal, Newborn, Child, and Adolescent Health (RMNCAH) services, and insufficient mental health care services. Nutrition services are also limited, contributing to overall poor health outcomes. The county's healthcare infrastructure is inadequate, with insufficient medical supplies and a lack of specialized health services. Additionally, there is a weak emergency and referral system, coupled with inadequate human resources for health. Financial constraints further exacerbate these issues, leading to limited access to medical cover and weak health governance.

Infrastructure: The county's infrastructure is underdeveloped, with inadequate road and transport networks posing significant challenges. Technical skills and resources are insufficient, hindering the development of critical infrastructure. Collaboration with the national government and private sector is necessary to improve energy and transport infrastructure. Moreover, there is a need for better maintenance of government buildings and enhanced capacity to respond to fire emergencies and other disasters.

Agriculture: Agriculture, being the backbone of Trans Nzoia’s economy, faces several issues. Poor farming practices and environmental degradation have led to reduced agricultural productivity. There is a need to promote sustainable agricultural practices and enhance value addition in processing local produce. The county's agricultural sector also suffers from inadequate market infrastructure and poor transport networks, which limit access to markets and hinder economic growth.

Governance: Weak governance structures and inadequate legislative frameworks are significant hurdles in the county's development. The lack of structured inter-sectoral collaboration frameworks hampers coordinated efforts in addressing the county's development needs. Additionally, financial constraints and limited human resources affect the implementation of key development projects and programs.

== Access ==
From Nairobi, Trans Nzoia is accessible by road via Nakuru-Eldoret, a 380 km journey that normally takes 5–6 hours. Trans Nzoia can also be accessed by air through Kitale's small airport, located about 7 kilometers from Kitale town. The road from Nairobi to Kitale is tarmacked and smooth.

== Notable people ==
- Milcah Chemos, Commonwealth games champion
- Ezra Chiloba, former IEBC Commissioner
- Paul Ereng, 1988 Olympic champion and former two-time indoor world champion record holder
- Fred Gumo, politician
- Luna Kamau, scientist
- Zipporah Kittony, politician and activist
- Wesley Korir, a long-distance runner who is a former Cherangany Member of Parliament
- Joseph Magutt, former Kenyan envoy to Germany, who declared in 2019 his interest to contesting for the position of governor in Trans Nzoia County
- Orie Rogo Manduli, Kenyan diplomat, activist and rally driver
- Musalia Mudavadi, Prime Cabinet Secretary of the Republic of Kenya
- Masinde Muliro, a central figure in Kenya's politics
- Johnson Sakaja, Governor of Nairobi
- Susan Wafula Nakhumicha, former health cabinet secretary of Kenya
- Eugene Wamalwa, politician
- Michael Kijana Wamalwa, former vice president and first to die in office
