= Lumboka-Chetambe war =

British colonial war

- Part of British Conquest of East Africa
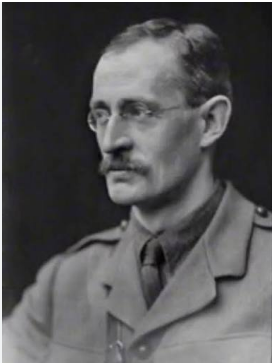
- Charles Hobbley, commissioner of the Kavirondo region during the Bukusu resistance
Date	1894-1895
Location	Eastern Uganda protectorate (present Western Kenya)
Result	British victory
Territorial changes	Incorporation of the Bukusu and Tachoni lands into the British empire

Belligerents
British Empire	Ababukusu
Buganda	Abatachoni
- Wanga Kingdom

Commanders and leaders
Charles.W.Hobley William Grant Captain Sitwell Nabongo Mumia Semei Kakungulu Sir Frederick Spire Namisi	Chief Namajanja Chetambe Ifilie Wakoli Wa Mkhisu

Units involved
Sudanese Company (under William Grant) Wanga column(spearmen) Swahili mercenaries Uasin Gishu Maasai Baganda Levy (Under Kakungulu)	Bukusu warriors Tachoni warriors

The Lumboka-Chetambe war was a military confrontation and a war of resistance by the Ababukusu and the Abatachoni sects of the Abaluhya community against the British Empire in present-day Western Kenya, taking place from 1894 to 1895, just as the British were starting to establish their presence in East Africa.

== Background ==
In his 1883-1884 expedition, the explorer, Joseph Thompson met the king of the Wanga kingdom, Nabongo Mumia at his capital in present-day Mumias. Subsequent visits by other European, Arab and Swahili traders, explorers and administrators increased the wealth and importance of Mumia's kingdom. This increased friction between the realm and surrounding communities, foremost among them the Bukusu, the traditional rivals of the Abawanga. There were several clashes between the Bukusu and Swahili porters and traders, who were passing through Bukusu land, resulting in the latter confiscating the guns of the former. The Bukusu also bought guns from deserters from the British base at Mumias, as the guns were highly valued by Bukusu Chiefs. This increased tensions with the British, who had just began to establish themselves in the Kavirondo region. The British commissioner, Sir Frederick Spire, thus sent a punitive expedition to the Bukusu fort of Lumboka to retrieve the guns from the natives and as a show of force. This, however backfired as the Bukusu effectively wiped out the British contigent and confiscated their guns. This marked the official beginning of the war.

== Course ==
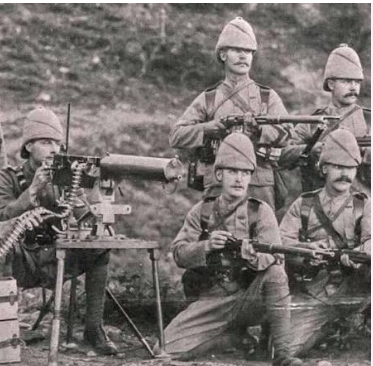
the maxim gun, used by the British in the conflict

Mr. Charles Hobley, known to the locals a Opilo, was called on to end the conflict and to replace Mr. Frederick Spire due to Spire's inability in subduing the Bukusu. Following the incident at the Lumboka Fort, Mr. William Grant, known locally as Chilande, assembled a company of over 13000 soldiers to pacify the Bukusu tribesmen, consisting mainly of Baganda and Sudanese soldiers, Maasai and Wanga warriors and Swahili mercenaries.The Baganda, mainly from Busoga in Uganda, were led by Chief Semei Kakungulu and the Wanga were led by Nabongo Mumia. Mr Ernest Berkeley, the new commissioner of Uganda appointed Captain Sitwell, himself under the new Kavirondo commissioner, Charles Hobley to accompany this makeshift army. Charles Hobley then launched a campaign against the Bukusu, culminating in the battle of Chetambe, that saw the Bukusu decisively defeated and eventually incorporated in the British empire. The superior weapons of the British, especially the Maxim and Hotchkiss guns, brought them victory. The Bukusu were only lightly armed with a few rifles bought or confiscated from the Swahili porters and earlier British missions. The bulk of their army consisted was spearmen and arrow men. This led to a high deathtoll among them.

Battle	Result
Lumboka I	Bukusu victory
Mukhweya	Bukusu victory
Lumboka II	Allied/British victory
Chetambe	Allied/British victory

== Results, aftermath and legacy ==
The war resulted in a crushing defeat for the Bukusu. The British came out as the dominant power in the Kavirondo region, annexing the entire area into the British empire for the next seven decades. The Bukusu leader, Namajanja ran away to his relatives in northern Bukusuland. The Bukusu themselves were placed under the supervision of their rivals, the Wanga under Nabongo Mumia.The two forts of Chetambe and Lumboka have become historical artefacts, signifying the resistance of African communities to British rule. The Bukusu were permanently pacified for most of the British colonial rule, up until the Mau Mau insurgency, half a century later, when they rose up again in resistance to colonial rule.
