= Dingonek =

Cryptid allegedly seen in Africa in the early 20th century

The dingonek as depicted in Jordan's Wide World Magazine (1917) article.

The dingonek is a creature said to have been seen near Lake Victoria in 1907 by big game hunter John Alfred Jordan and members of his hunting party, as recounted by fellow big-game hunter Edgar Beecher Bronson in his 1910 memoir In Closed Territory. This account was followed by an article published in 1913 in the Journal of East Africa Uganda Natural History Society by Charles William Hobley, in which he claims to have encountered further accounts of similarly described creatures. In 1918, an article published by MacLean's declared that the beast was a newly discovered animal species.

== In Closed Territory ==
The sole description of this creature occurs in big-game hunter Edgar Beecher Bronson's 1910 memoir In Closed Territory. In his memoir, Bronson recounts a campsite discussion involving the creature with fellow safari hunter John Alfred Jordan. After musing about the okapi, Bronson reports that Jordan said the following:

Then there's the infernal horror of the reptilian 'bounder' that comes up the Maggori River, out of the lake the Lumbwa have christened Dingonek. And it's real prize money that beauty would fetch, five or ten thousand quid at least, and you bet I've got my Wanderobo and Lumbwa always on the lookout for one when the Maggori is in flood.

According to Bronson, Jordan claims he encountered the beast with his hunting party ("Mataia, the boy there, and Mosoni with me"). One member of the party, Mataia, claims to have seen it twice, yet Bronson expressed skepticism. Jordan says he encountered the creature while heading to the Maggori, when:

Presently I heard the bush smashing and up raced my Lumbwa, wide-eyed and gray as their black skins could get, with the yarn that they had seen a frightful strange beast on the river bank, which at sight of them had plunged into the water as they described it, some sort of cross between a sea serpent, a leopard, and a whale. Thinking they had gone crazy or were pulling my leg, I told them I'd believe them if they could show me, but not before. After a long shauri palaver among themselves, back they finally ventured, returning in half an hour to say that IT lay full length exposed on the water in midstream."

Jordan hurried to the Maggori and saw the creature as described. He provides the following description:

Holy saints, but he was a sight fourteen or fifteen feet [4.3 or 4.6 m] long, head big as that of a lioness but shaped and marked like a leopard, two long white fangs sticking down straight out of his upper jaw, back broad as a hippo, scaled like an armadillo, but colored and marked like a leopard, and a broad fin tail, with slow, lazy swishes of which he was easily holding himself level in the swift current, headed up stream.

Gad! but he was a hideous old haunter of a nightmare, was that beast-fish, that made you want an aeroplane to feel safe of him; for while he lay up stream of me, I had been brought down to the river bank precisely where he had taken water, and there all about me in the soft mud and loam were the imprints of feet wide of diameter as a hippo's but clawed like a reptile's, feet you knew could carry him ashore and claws you could be bally well sure no man could ever get loose from once they had nipped him.

Jordan notes that its fangs appeared "long enough to go clean through a man", and he describes how he sat and waited watching the creature. In time, he feared the creature might move and see him, and he fired a .303 round from his rifle behind the creature's "leopard ear". The alleged animal sprang out of the water, and Jordan sprinted into the bush in terror.

In time, Jordan calmed and listened for the beast as his party ran deeper into the bush. Jordan says that he could not recall seeing the beast's legs because he was fixated on escaping, and ponders how a .303 round was unable to stop the animal from a distance of ten yards (9 m). Jordan says that although he searched for the beast along shorelines and bodies of water across "several miles" over the course of two days, he encountered neither the beast nor its tracks.

According to Bronson, Jordan then asked him to inquire with his hunting party about what they witnessed. Through an interpreter, Bronson claims they provided nearly identical descriptions of the beast. Bronson follows this account by noting that when he visited Uganda "in November last", he met with "ex-Collector James Martin", who told him that "a great water serpent or reptile was seen on or near the north shore of the lake, which was worshipped by the natives, who believed its coming a harbinger of heavy crops and large increase of their flocks and herds."

Finally, Bronson says that:

Again, in December, while dining with the Senior Deputy Commissioner, C. W. Hobley, C. M. G., at his residence in Nairobi, the very night before starting on this safari, in speaking of the origin of the sleeping sickness Mr. Hobley told me that the Baganda, Wasoga, and Kavirondo of the north shore of the lake had from time immemorial sacrificed burnt offerings of cattle and sheep to a lake reptile of great size and terrible appearance they called Luquata, which occasionally appeared along or near the shore; that since the last coming of Luquata was just shortly before the first outbreak of the sleeping sickness, the natives firmly believe that the muzungu have killed Luquata with the purpose and as the means of making them victims of the dread plague. Of the existence in the lake of such an unclassed reptile, Mr. Hobley considered there was no question.

== Charles William Hobley ==
In 1913, Charles William Hobley published an article in the Journal of East Africa Uganda Natural History Society, in which he discusses "Some Unidentified Beasts" and mentions Bronson's account. According to Hobley:

At the time this story appeared it was considered that this was probably a traveller's tale, told to entertain a newcomer, but I have since met a man who a few years back wandering about the Mara River or Ngare Dubash which rises in Sotik, crosses the Anglo-German boundary and runs into Lake Victoria in German territory. He emphatically asserts that he saw the beast. He was at the time where the Mara River crosses the frontier, and the river was in high flood. The beast came floating down the river on a big log, and he estimated its length at about sixteen feet [5 m], but could not certain of its length as its tail was in the water. He describes it as spotted like a leopard, covered with scales, and having a head like an otter; he did not see the long fangs described by Mr. Jordan. He fired at it and hit it; it slid off the log into the water and was not seen again.

Hobley theorizes that Bronson's account may be connected to "the greatest rarity which has not yet been bagged [which] would appear to be the extraordinary creature which is said to inhabit certain of the rivers running into Lake Victoria and the lake itself". He mentions several accounts of lake monsters in the region alongside Bronson's account.

== Maclean's ==
In 1918, Canadian magazine Maclean's reprinted material from an article by Jordan himself in The Wide World Magazine, and declared that his evidence for the dingonek "is very positive and believable." According to Jordan:

It lives in Lake Victoria Nyanza and its numerous tributaries, and there is no record of the monster having been seen in any other part of the world. Whether it is a descendant of one of the huge prehistoric saurions that has by a process of adaptation – living as it does in impenetrable regions far away from the encroachments of civilized man – continued with but slight modifications through prodigious ages to the present time, or whether it is an unclassified reptile or amphibian, it is equally impossible to say, as no specimen exists either of its bones or of its skin. That this monster does exist, however, there can be no particle of doubt, as the testimony of authoritative eye-witnesses cannot be reasonably discredited.

== See also ==
- Nandi bear
- Agogwe

== Bibliography ==
- Bronson, Edgar Beecher (26 February 1910). In Closed Territory. Chicago, IL: A. C. McClurg & Co – via Internet Archive.
- Costain, T. B., ed. (January 1918). "Something About the Dingonek: A New Monster Discovered in Darkest Africa". Maclean's Magazine. Vol. 31, no. 3. Toronto, Canada: The Maclean Publishing Company, Ltd. pp. 67–70 – via Internet Archive.
- Hobley, C. W. (July 1913). Hobley, C. W.; Anderson, Anderson (eds.). "On Some Unidentified Beasts". Journal of East Africa Uganda Natural History Society. 3 (6). Longmans, Green, & Co.: 48–52 – via Internet Archive.
- Jordan, J. A. (1917). "Unknown Animals of the African Wilds". The Wide World Magazine. Vol. 39. A. Newnes, Limited. pp. 205–206.
