= Bukusu dialect =

Dialect of the Masaba language

Bukusu
- Lubukusu
- Native to: Kenya
- Ethnicity: Bukusu
- Native speakers: 1.4 million (2009 census)
- Language family: Niger–Congo?: Atlantic–Congo; Volta-Congo; Benue–Congo; Bantoid; Southern Bantoid; Bantu; Northeast Bantu; Great Lakes Bantu; Masaba–Luhya; Masaba; Bukusu

Language codes
- ISO 639-3: bxk
- Glottolog: buku1249
- Guthrie code: JE.31c

Bukusu is a dialect of the Masaba language spoken by the Bukusu tribe of the Luhya people of western Kenya. It is one of several ethnically Luhya dialects; however, it is more closely related to the Gisu dialect of Masaaba in eastern Uganda (and to the other Luhya dialect of Tachoni) than it is to other languages spoken by the Luhya.

== Phonology ==
p		tʃ	k
(b)	(d)	(dʒ)	(ɡ)
f	s		x
β			
m	n	ɲ	ŋ
	l r	j	w

Several consonants undergo fortition after nasal consonants: [β, w → b, j → dʒ, l, r → d]; Mutonyi (2000) postulates that Bukusu has no phonemic voiced plosives.

== Variations ==
The language has three main variations:

- The dialect spoken north of Kimilili area, with its heaviest influence being noted in the region around Kitale
- The dialect spoken west of Webuye town, with its purest form being in the region around, and to the west of, Bungoma
- The dialect spoken east of Webuye town, extending into Kakamega and Lugari districts.

Of these, the language spoken around Kitale town is usually considered the purest form - this is because the other two dialects are significantly influenced by other dialects of the Luhya languages.

=== Influences ===
The Bukusu tribe lives in Bungoma district, which borders Uganda to the west and Kakamega district of Kenya to the east. Across the border in Uganda live the Masaba and the Gisu, both closely related to the Bukusu by a shared language and a common culture. Intermarriage between the Bukusu and these Ugandan tribes is very common and is, in fact, encouraged by the respective communities. As a result, many Bukusu have close relatives among the Gisu and Masaaba, and vice versa.

During the Ugandan civil wars of the 1970s, many of the Gisu and Masaba left Uganda for Kenya, mainly to live with Bukusu relatives around the Bungoma area. After the wars ended, a large number did not return to Uganda, having already started new lives in Kenya. Their large dispersal among the Bukusu in that area has had a discernible influence on the Bukusu language in the Bungoma region. Native speakers of the language will easily identify someone from the area based on their speech. Of particular note is the substitution of R with L, so that, for example, the verb 'khuufwara' (xuufwara) - to wear [clothes] is now pronounced 'khuufwala', as it is in the Gisu and Masaaba languages.

The dialect spoken east of Webuye town is influenced by the neighbouring Kabras and Tachoni dialects of the Luhya language. This is particularly noticeable in the changes in noun prefixes: in the original Bukusu language, for example, the term 'something' would be rendered as 'siSindu'. In the Kabras language, the term is rendered as 'eShindu'. The Bukusu east of Webuye town will usually say 'eSindu', thus adopting the prefix of the Kabras language while retaining the Bukusu root word 'Sindu' (as opposed to the Kabras root word, 'Shindu').

Because it borders the nilotic Kalenjin languages of the Pokot, Nandi and Sebei to the north, east and west, the Bukusu language spoken in Kitale area has largely retained its original form, save for a number of loan words from those languages. It is markedly different from the other dialects discussed above, to the extent that it takes a while for a native speaker of one of the other two dialects to adopt it as their daily speech.

== See also ==
- Luhya languages

== Bibliography ==
- De Blois, Kornelis Frans (1975) 'Bukusu generative phonology and aspects of Bantu structure' (Annales de MRAC, no. 85). Tervuren: Musée Royal de l'Afrique Centrale.
- Nasiombe Mutonyi (2000) Aspects of Bukusu Morphology and Phonology
