= Barasa =

Barasa is a surname. Notable people with the surname include:

- Didmus Wekesa Barasa, Kenyan politician and military officer
- George Barasa (born 1990), Kenyan human rights activist
- Jonathan Barasa (1916–1996), Kenyan chief
- Nerijus Barasa (born 1978), Lithuanian association football player
- Violet Barasa (1975–2007), Kenyan volleyball player

== See also ==
- Barasa acronyctoides, an Asian moth species
