= Mumboism =

Mumboism, also known as the Mumbo cult, was a new religious movement founded by Onyango Dunde in the early 20th century. Followers of the religion, known as Mumboites, were most active in the Nyanza region of Kenya near Lake Victoria. The movement had anti-imperial teachings and was suppressed by the colonial government of Kenya.

== Origins ==
Mumboism began during the British colonial era in Kenya, when Christian missionaries were active in the region. In 1913, Onyango Dunde began to preach that he had been swallowed by a serpent in Lake Victoria. The serpent spit him out, and gave him a prophecy that he would spread to his followers:

I am the God Mumbo whose two homes are in the sun and in the lake. I have chosen you to be my mouthpiece. Go and tell all the Africans.... that from henceforth I am their God. Those whom I choose personally and those who acknowledge me, will live forever in plenty.... the Christian religion is rotten.... All Europeans are your enemies, but the time is shortly coming when they will all disappear from the country."

== History ==
In keeping with the prophecy, Dunde condemned European culture, Christianity, and the influence of colonialism. He also prophesied a golden age that would arrive with the end of the European presence in the region. Mumboism was popular among the Luo and Kisii people, but its influence spread beyond Africans who were formal followers of Dunde.

Mumboism's teachings have been characterized as a strain of millennialism, anticipating a golden age, perhaps influenced by Christian teachings of a cataclysmic end to the current world's existence. Some teachings were that "water would turn into blood, and only Mumboites would have drinking water, all white people would disappear leaving only Africans as sole survivors, or the Germans would come and cut off the arms of those in clothes (i.e., Europeans and Westernized Africans). [...] The projected utopia would be a time of role reversal, healing, and plenty that could only be effected by traditional sacrifices and rituals".

In the years following the end of World War I, many of the Kisii (AbaGusii) became followers of Mumboism in growing numbers. Some factors contributing to this were frustration with the colonial government due to deteriorating agricultural, trade and health conditions among the Kisii people, fluctuating currency value, and the colonial administration's increasingly burdensome demands concerning taxation, labour owed to the colonial government, and requirements for registration.

The golden age prophecy of an end to European government appealed to the Kisii, who had openly revolted against the colonial administration in 1905, 1908 and 1914, only to be defeated by the Europeans. Its appeal among the Kisii people was small during times of prosperity, when meeting the colonial administration's demands was easier. During times of economic hardship, its religious and political appeal grew among the Kisii.

The Bogonko clan, the wealthiest and most influential among the Kisii, were adherents of Mumboism. Their position had been undermined by the European presence, and they were leaders of Mumboism particularly among the Kitutu subclan.

=== Suppression ===
The colonial administration was threatened by the anti-European message of Mumboism. The colonial government ultimately banned Mumboism in 1954. Much earlier in 1921, it had exiled Dunde and other Mumbo leaders to the holy Islamic island of Lamu in the Indian Ocean. A 1919 government report had listed important leaders of the movement, some of whom were openly opposed to the colonial government: Mosi Auma of Kabondo, Nyakundi of Kitutu, Omwenga of Wanjare.

The colonial administration had a tendency to conflate Mumboism with other indigenous religious beliefs, such as the cult around the late prophet Sakawa (Zakawa), who it was said had prophesied European rule, the building of the railroad and the site of Kisii. Mumboism was not the sole religious movement in Central or Eastern Africa to reflect anti-European sentiment. The Kamba people around Machakos, Kenya, had a millennial cult that developed in the interwar years around the prophet Ndonye wa Kauti, which had parallels with Mumboism.

Dini ya Msambwa or Nsambwa (DYM), "religion of the ancestral spirits", was another rejection of Christianity that developed during the early 20th century in Kenya. It was founded by Elijah Masinde, among the Babukusu. Yet another new religious movement was the Karing'a movement, influenced by Agikuyu religious ideal concepts similar to democracy.

== See also ==
- East Africa Protectorate
- History of Kenya
- Kenya Colony
- New religious movement
- Religion in Africa
- Religion in Kenya
