= Bukusu =

Tribe living in Kenya

Babukusu
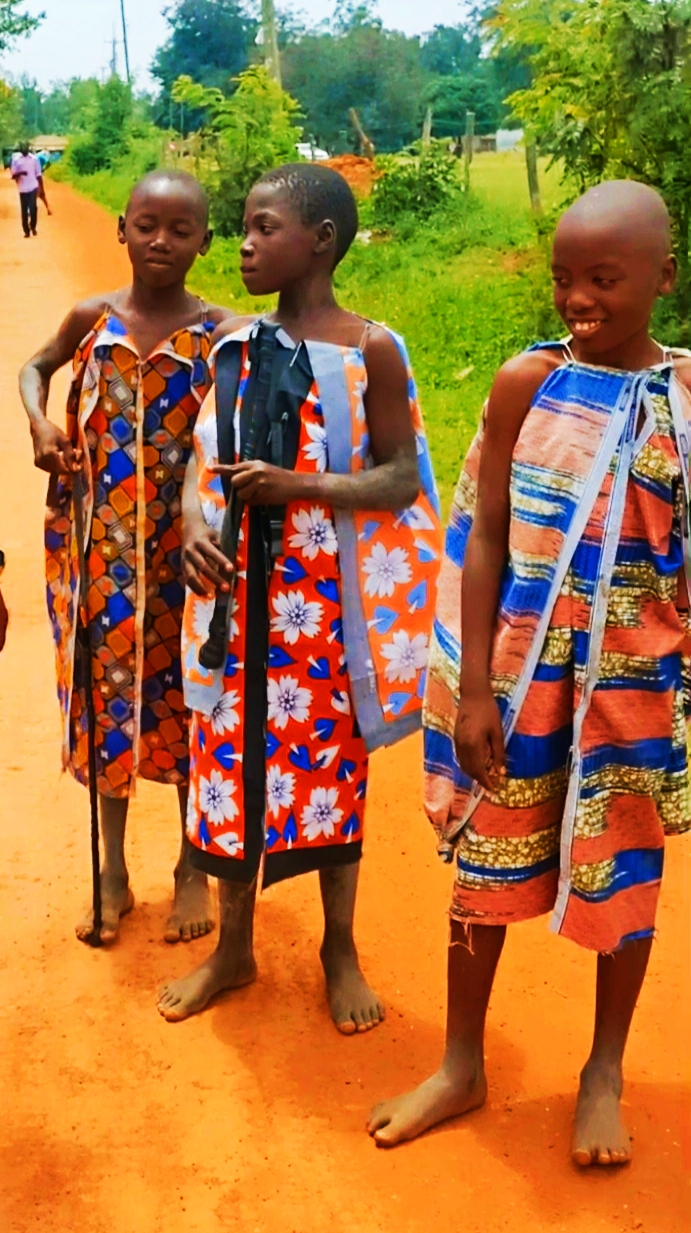

Total population
- Over 1.2m

Regions with significant populations
- Kenya: Over 1.2m (est.)

Languages
- Bukusu dialect Swahili

Religion
- Christianity

Related ethnic groups
- Maragoli Tachoni Kabras Gisu

The Bukusu people (Bukusu: Babukusu) are one of the 17 Kenyan tribes of the Luhya Bantu people of East Africa residing mainly in the counties of Bungoma and Trans Nzoia. They are the largest tribe of the Luhya nation, with 1,188,963 identifying as Bukusu in the 2019 Kenyan census. They speak the Bukusu dialect.

== Origins ==
The Bukusu myths of origin state that the first man, Mwambu (the discoverer or inventor), was made from mud by Wele Khakaba (meaning "God the Creator") at a place called Mumbo (which translates to "west"). God then created a woman known as Sela to be his wife. Mwambu and his descendants moved out of Mumbo and settled on the foothills of Mount Elgon (known to them as Masaba), from where their descendants grew to form the current Bukusu population.

Anthropologists believe that the Bukusu did not become distinct from the rest of the Luhya population until the late 18th century at the very earliest. They moved into central Uganda as part of a much larger group of people, many forming the eastern extension of the great Bantu migration out of central Africa. The Bukusu word for a sub-tribe such as the Bukusu, as well as smaller clans (for example, Kitanga) or phatries (such as Kituika, within the Kitanga clan) within the Bukusu people, is ekholo. The Bukusu are one of the major sub-tribes of the Luhya people.

== Settlement ==
Together with other Luhya sub-nations, the Bukusu are thought to have first settled north of Lake Turkana at a place called Enambukutu. From there they settled in the Cherangani Hills at a place called Embayi, also known as Silikwa-mbayi. After evil and bad omens befell them, they dispersed taking six routes: five going around the western side of Mount Elgon and one via the eastern side of Mount Elgon. Those who went via the western side of Mount Elgon included the Basilikwa, the Banabayi, the Baneala, the Bakikayi and the Bamalaba. The Mwalie cluster took the eastern side route and settled at the Mwalie hills. This area was already inhabited by some Kalenjin sub-nationalities like the Laku, the Sabiny( known by the bukusu as basawinja), the Bongomek, and the Sebei, who were hostile to their new neighbors. To protect themselves against these tribes the Bukusu built fortified villages, an ancient art from their origin in Misri.

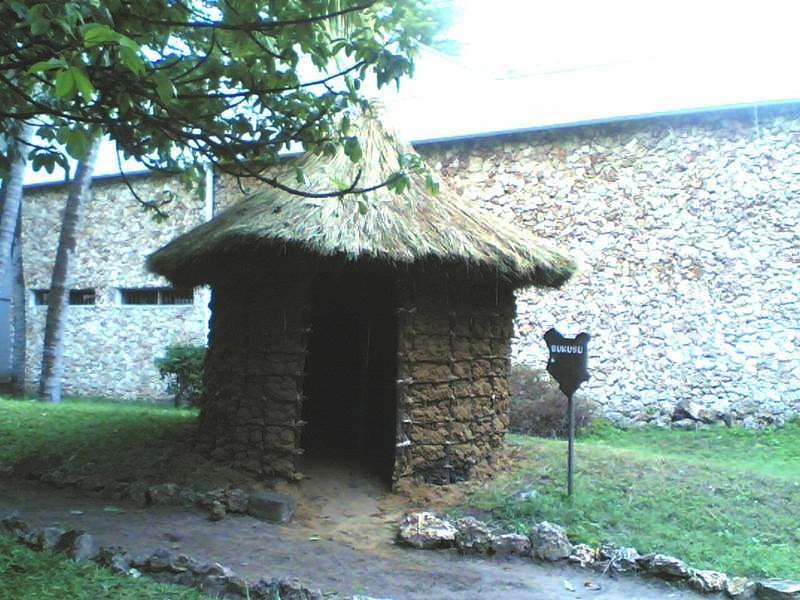
A replica of a Bukusu hut

Currently, the Bukusu mainly inhabit Bungoma, Trans Nzoia, Uasin Gishu, Kakamega and Busia Counties of Western region of Kenya. The Bamasaba of Uganda are very closely related to the Babukusu, with many shared customs and closely related dialects. Previously, the Bukusu were referred to as the Kitosh by the colonialists; this was a word derived from the Nandi and Kwavi who used the word derogatively to describe the Babukusu. Kitosh means 'the terrible ones'; they called them this because the Bukusu warriors were ruthless and decisive in battlefields. Following vigorous campaigns, the name Kitosh was eventually substituted by Bukusu in the mid-1950s.

=== Oral tradition ===
The Bukusu trace their origin from Muntu we Entebbe, who lived in Tabasya of Misri. Muntu was a great warrior who was later deified by the people of Misri. His son Mwambu married Sela, the granddaughter Samba Ambarani, who is believed to be Abraham the Hebrew. Mwambu founded the cities of Kush, Nabibia (Nubia), Namelu (Meroe), Rwa (Alwa) and others including Soba and Balana. Mwambu became the father of Mwaabini the inventor and discoverer. Mwaabini was the father of Kongolo and Saba.

Masaba, the father of Bukusu and Kisu, led the people to Embayi which was later to become Sirikwa, or the fallen kingdom. It fell after the people disobeyed their God Khakaba, so he sent a giant boulder from the sky which hit the land of Mbayi, causing an earthquake followed by swarms of stinging insects, epidemics and other calamities which forced the subjects of Sirikwa to scatter. They dispersed and settled among the Kipsigis, the Nandi, the Samburu, the Marakwet, the Borana and further beyond. The main body of the population headed south east and west under the banners of Basirikwa, Banabayi, Bakikayi, Baneala, Bamalaba and Bamwalie.

== Traditional life ==
The Bukusu lived in fortified villages, and did not have a structure of central authority. The highest authority was the village headman, called Omukasa, who was usually elected by the men of the village. There were also healers and prophets who acquired great status through their knowledge of tribal tradition, medicines, and religion. Elijah Masinde, a resistance leader and traditional medicine man, was revered as a healer in the early 1980s.

=== Family ===
Bukusu family structure was traditionally modeled on the Luhya structure, it was and still is modeled on Bukusus culture itself. Families were usually polygamous, with the first wife accorded a special status among her co-wives. Society was entirely patriarchal: women were present not only as child-bearers but also as an indication of status. In addition, the practice of polygamy meant more hands to work the fields, an advantage in a society founded on agriculture.

Children inherited the clan of their father, and were not allowed to marry from either their own clan or their mother's clan. The first son of the first wife was usually the main heir to his father, and he had a special name denoting this status: Simakulu. At birth, children were usually named after grandparents or famous people, or after the weather. Male and female names were different: male names frequently began with 'W', while female names usually began with 'N'. Thus, for example, a boy born during a famine could be named 'Wanjala', while a girl could be named 'Nanjala'. Both names share the same root word, 'njala', from 'eNjala', the Bukusu word for hunger.

=== Initiation ===
The Bukusu practice male circumcision. It is thought that they adopted the practice from contact with the Kalenjin at Mount Elgon. Others argue, however, that the presence of the practice in the other Luhya tribes indicates an earlier adoption, before the Bukusu settled at Mount Elgon.

In ceremonies that were spaced about two years apart, young boys of a particular age (usually about 15 years) would, on getting the go-ahead from their parents, invite relatives and friends to their initiation.

The initiation was a public event, witnessed by all. Going through the operation without showing any sign of pain is thought to be an indicator of bravery. Once circumcised, an initiate became a member of an age group.

There are eight age-groups known as 'Bibingilo'. These are (Bakolongolo (2000-2010), Bakikwameti (2012-2022), Bakananachi (2024-2034), Bakinyikeu (2036-1946), Banyange (1948-1958), Bamaina (1960-1970), Bachuma (1972-1986), Basawa (1988-1998)), forming a cyclical system spanning over 100 years, with each age-group lasting for 12 years(composed of 6 sub-sets of 2 years each) apart from Bachuma which lasts for 16 years (made up of 8 sub-sets of 2-years each), one of which lasted from 1872–1886. The reason for this was the tradition that there was an old man of the age group of Basawa from the previous cycle who was still alive and he was not meant to live and see the next Basawa. Eventually the old man died in 1884 and the Basawa ensued the next initiation period in 1888. It was then agreed to avoid such delays, and that any man who lives long enough to appear reaching the second cycle would be killed. This has been the tradition since then. Once the last age-group has been reached, the first is restarted, and so on. For example, the Bachuma age-group lasted from 1872 to 1886: every Bukusu circumcised within this period (that is, in 1872 through to 1886) belongs to that age-group. In 1888, the Basawa age group began, and lasted until 1898. Each age group is represented once every century.

Female circumcision is not a traditional Bukusu practice, though some clans are said to have practiced it. This is especially the case around Mount Elgon, where the neighbouring Kalenjin tribes also practice a form of female circumcision.

Although circumcision was universal among the Bukusu, the form of the ceremony varied according to the clan. In particular, the festivities and ceremonies accompanying the final stage of initiation, when the now-healed initiates came out of seclusion to rejoin their families as 'men', were specific to clans, and have been handed down largely intact to the present day. Much was taught to these young initiates during this time which enabled them to face marriage with information.

=== Marriage ===
First marriages are typically between men aged 18–20, and women about age 16. There were two types of first-time marriage: arranged marriages and enforced eloping. If a young man came from a well-to-do family, he would ask his sisters to find a girl for him to marry. The ability of a girl to cook well, bear children and work in the fields were the main attractions of a potential wife. Once a girl was identified, an emissary was sent to her parents to ask for her hand. The girl had no say whatsoever in the whole matter: bride price would be discussed, and once paid she would be sent to live with her new husband. This form of marriage is common in traditional households.

In some cases, the potential groom would be from a poor family and could not afford to pay the likely bride price. Traditional society allowed such boys to abduct the girls they intended to marry. (The girl had to present an opportunity to be 'abducted', so her cooperation was essential.) The couple would then leave their home to live with a far-off relative for a while, until the boy acquired enough wealth to pay the original bride price, as well as a fine, to the parents of the girl. This practice has since died out.

The Bukusu highly approve of intermarriages between themselves and the BaMasaaba; they have similarities in codes of conduct, marriage customs, circumcision traditions and folklore. Among the most famous of Bukusu marriage customs is the immense respect accorded to in-laws. A lady, for example, treats her father-in-law with much deference, and they are not allowed to make physical contact in any way. The same is true of a man and his mother-in-law.

In marriage, duties were strictly segregated. Housework and agricultural duties were performed by the women and children. The older boys looked after cattle. Young, newly married men formed the community's warriors, while middle-aged men did little. Older men formed the village's council of elders, and resolved disputes. Punishment for crimes was usually on an eye-for-an-eye basis, while petty crimes like theft were punished by the perpetrators being expelled from the village, and their property confiscated and redistributed to the wronged party.

Cattle were very important as the main means of exchange, alongside cowrie shells (known as chisimbi). Most values, from the beauty of a girl to the price of a field of land, were expressed in terms of heads of cattle. Possessing cattle, wealth, and prosperous agriculture, the Bukusu were sometimes not only admired but also envied by neighboring communities. Occasionally intermarriages would take place between them and the other communities and it was common practice for Kalenjin neighbors to give the Bukusu their sons to look after their herds of cattle. In times of famine, which are said to have been frequent among their Kalenjin neighbors, the latter used to even sell their children to the Bukusu. The Bukusu also used to send their own young boys to grow up with Kalenjin or Maasai families, in some cases for espionage purposes.

=== Death ===
Being sedentary pastoralists, they had time to care for their sick and bury their dead. A sick person was looked after until he recuperated or died. When a person died, he was buried in a grave with a warrior's weapons if he was an elder. Several functions were performed during and after the funeral ceremony. Ordinarily, burial pits were 3–4 feet (0.91–1.22 m) deep, much shallower than today's. People were buried facing east, the direction in which the sun rises. There are two known clans amongst the Bukusu who bury their people in a sitting position.

Wild animals like hyenas would sometimes exhume corpses from graves and eat them. In such an incident, people recovered the skull of the desecrated body and hanged it in a leafy tree. When the family of the deceased migrated, they brewed beer (kamalwa ke khuukhalanga) for the ceremony of transferring the skull with them to the new home or settlement. An elder woman was entrusted with the responsibility of conveying the skull to the new site. Burial of the dead was ingrained in the Bukusu traditions.

== Demographics ==
The Bukusu people are the largest sub-tribe of the Luhya people in Kenya, residing mainly in the counties of Bungoma and Trans Nzoia. In the 2019 Kenyan census, the total number of Luhyas was estimated at 6,823,842. Of these, 3, 944, 257 volunteered information about their sub-tribes, with Bukusu being named by 1,188,963 people.

== Economic activities ==
Bukusu accounts indicate that both agricultural and pastoral economies have been practiced by the tribe for as long as can be remembered. This is authenticated by the vast amount of knowledge regarding farming practices, their rich pastoral vocabulary and the variety of legends connected with pastoral life. Today, they farm mainly maize for subsistence and sugar cane as a cash crop in the Bungoma area, as well as wheat in the Kitale area. Cattle and sheep are universally kept: cattle for milk, and sheep for meat and ceremonial functions (e.g.: offers for sacrifice). Larger or polygamous families will usually have a team of oxen for ploughing and haulage. Chicken, a traditional delicacy, are now kept for commercial egg production. The Bukusu also practiced craftsmanship skills in pottery, weaving, and blacksmithing.

== Politics ==
Resistance and Nationalism

The Bukusu were known for their fierce opposition to colonial rule. Early in the colonial period, the community resisted British encroachment, including notable conflicts such as the 1895 revolt at Lumboka and Chetambe forts. These uprisings were some of the earliest organized acts of defiance against colonial forces in the region, as the Bukusu fought to preserve their autonomy and land from European control.

In the 20th century, the Bukusu's resistance evolved into broader nationalist movements. A key figure during this period was Elijah Masinde, a healer and spiritual leader who founded the Dini ya Msambwa movement in the 1940s. This religious sect combined anti-colonial activism with a revival of traditional Bukusu spirituality and called for the end of British rule. Despite repeated imprisonments, Masinde remained a symbol of defiance and is remembered as a pivotal leader in the struggle for Kenyan independence,

The Bukusu currently form one of the main support bases of the governing coalition in Kenya, through the Forum for the Restoration of Democracy – Kenya (FORD–Kenya) political party led by Moses Wetangula and the New Ford Kenya party led by Eugene Wamalwa. Previously, they were associated with opposition to the Kalenjin-dominated reign of former President Daniel arap Moi. Their political leaders have included Michael Christopher Wamalwa Kijana, Masinde Muliro, George Welime Kapten, Musikari Nazi Kombo and Moses Masika Wetangula, Peter Kisuya, Wakoli Bifwoli, Wafula Wamunyiyi, David Eseli Simiyu, and Lawrence Sifuna.

== Culture ==
The Bukusu play a traditional seven-stringed lyre known as the litungu and the silili. Elijah Masinde, who formalised the traditional faith through Dini ya Msambwa, was a Bukusu elder; he promoted the culture and faith of the Bukusu and hence Luhya and African peoples. In Dini Ya Msambwa, Elijah Masinde resisted colonialism and the extermination of the Luhya people's way of life. Circumcision Bukusu circumcision is done to boys that are between 12–28 years. They play trading jingle bells "chinyimba" as they call, visit all there relatives to inform them the date of circumcision. The boy to be circumcised, will do everything and make sure, he has informed everyone. Third day to the d day, the boy will be smeared with millet flour, "khuchukhamo" which will be used to make alcohol taken on the day of circumcision. The second last day, He will visit his uncle where by the bull will be slaughtered (likhoni) to signify the connection to uncle's place. That will be the day of celebration and there after, the boy will be taken the following day to a place called "sitosi/silongo", to be smeared by mud before he brought back home, stand in the courtyard (etiang'i) and be circumcised.

== Notable people ==
Notable Bukusu people include:

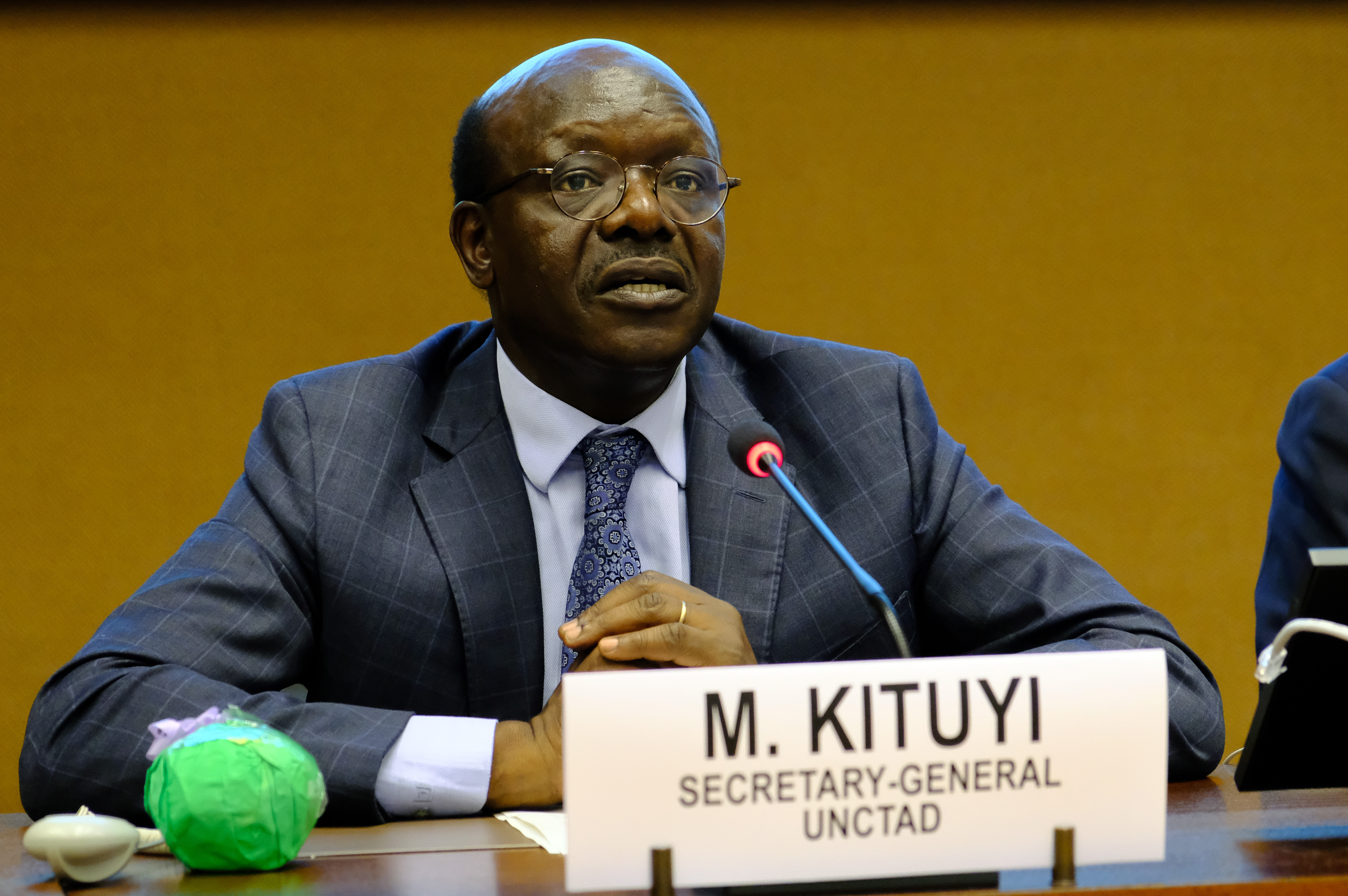
Mukhisa Kituyi Secretary General of UNCTAD

- Lawrence Simiyu Sifuna (January 1946 – December 2023) Member of Parliament for Bumula, the first MP of that constituency.[1] He was first elected to the Kenyan Parliament on 8 November 1979 in the then larger Bungoma South constituency. Sifuna was remembered as one of the left-wing members of parliament in the 1980s (a.k.a. one of the seven bearded sisters) who persistently attacked Attorney General Charles Njonjo and government policies that clamped down on the basic human rights of Kenyans.

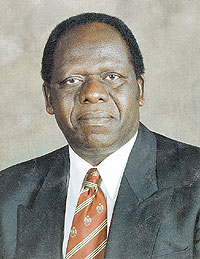
Michael Kijana Wamalwa -Former Vice President

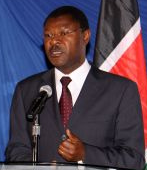
Moses Wetangula

- Jonathan Barasa (1916 – December 1996) was a Kenyan chief from Sirisia
- Nancy Baraza (born 1957 in Bungoma District, Western Kenya) First Deputy Chief Justice of Kenya)
- Wakoli Bifwoli, Omuyemba, former MP Bumula constituency
- Edwin Watenya Sifuna, Omumutilu, long-term secretary general of ODM, Super Senator of Nairobi. Sisi ndio Sifuna.
- Mukhisa Kituyi, Omutukwika Mukitang'a, former Kimilili MP, Trade Minister and current Secretary General of UNCTAD
- Musikari Kombo, Omulunda, former Minister and Chairman of FORD–Kenya
- Kenneth Lusaka (born 18 September 1963)The 2nd and current speaker of the Kenyan Senate
- Elijah Masinde, Omubichachi, resistance leader and founder of Dini ya Musambwa
- Masinde Muliro, 1922 - August 14, 1992) Omukokho, former minister and opposition leader
- Maurice Michael Otunga, Omukhone, first Kenya Cardinal, Former head of the Catholic Church in Kenya
- James Situma Kenyan footballer
- Wafula Wabuge, a first and only President of Western Kenya during the Majimbo system and a former Ambassador to the US
- Eugene Wamalwa, Omuengele, former MP Saboti Constituency and currently Cabinet Secretary for Devolution
- Michael Kijana Wamalwa, Omuengele, former vice president of Kenya
- Wycliffe Wangamati Kenyan actuary and politician currently serving as the Second Governor of Bungoma County
- Paul Wekesa (born 2 July 1967) Former professional tennis player
- Moses Wetangula, current Party Leader of FORD–Kenya and Senator, Bungoma County

== See also ==
- Kintu, a creation myth figure of Buganda
