= Magwagwa =

- Location within Kenya
- Coordinates: 0.48°S 35.02°E
- Country: Kenya
- County: Nyamira County
- Time zone: UTC+3 (EAT)

Magwagwa is a small town in North Mugirango Constituency, Nyamira County in Kenya.

The town is inhabited by the Gusii people and serves as the Magwagwa Ward headquarters. It lies between Chabera — off the Kisii-Kisumu road at Sondu — and Ikonge off The Kisii-Chemosit road.

The area is densely populated with its main source of income coming from small scale farming. The main cash crops are tea, coffee and pyrethrum in some places. There are no major economic projects in the area except the Sondu Miriu hydroelectric power station.

== See also ==
- Borioba
