= Battle of Chetambe =

British colonial battle

- Part of Ababukusu resistance(Lumboka-Chetambe war),part of the wider British conquest of East Africa
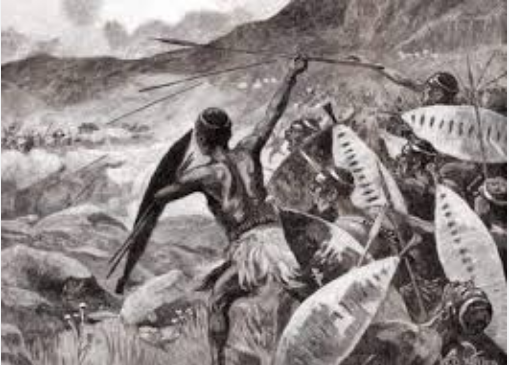
- Ababukusu warriors defending against a British assault on Chetambe Fort
Date	20th April 1895
Location	Chetambe hill, North Kavirondo, Uganda Protectorate(Present day Bungoma County, Kenya)
Result	British Victory
Territorial changes	British Conquest Of Bukusu and Tachoni land, including most of Mount Elgon region

Belligerents
British Empire	Bukusu
Wanga Kingdom	Tachoni
- Buganda

Commanders and leaders
Charles.W.Hobley William Grant Captain Sitwell Nabongo Mumia Semei Kakungulu Sir Frederick Spire	Chetambe Ifilie Wakoli Wa Mkhisu

Units involved
Sudanese Company (under William Grant) Wanga column(spearmen) Swahili mercenaries Uasin Gishu Maasai Baganda Levy (Under Kakungulu)	Tachoni warriors Bukusu warriors

Strength
~1500: 1000 Sudanese and Baganda troops 300 Wanga Spearmen and Uasin Gishu Maasai 200 Swahili mercenaries	~500 Over 450 Bukusu 37 Tachoni

Casualties and losses
91 dead	487 dead (450 Bukusu and 37 Tachoni)

The Battle of Chetambe was a military confrontation between the British Empire with its allies and the Abaluhya subtribes of Ababukusu and Abatachoni, that took place on 20th April 1895 at Chetambe hill in the North Kavirondo region of the then Uganda Protectorate (now Western Kenya). It marked the conclusion of the Lumboka-Chetambe war, the attempt by the Ababukusu to resist incorporation into the British Empire and to check the Power of their rivals, the Abawanga. It subsequently ended with an overwhelming coalition victory and the beginning of complete British ascendancy in Bukusuland and the rest of Luhyaland for the next seven decades.

== Background ==
In response to the successful ambush of Lumboka by the British Imperial force, more than 450 Bukusu warriors ran for safety to the more easily defensible fort of Chetambe.Located at the top of hill, The fort was built by Chetambe Ifilie, hence its name. According to reports by Sir Charles Hobley, the Provincial commissioner of the Kavirondo region, it was about 250 yards in diameter,with loop-holed mud walls nine feet high, a ditch six feet deep and low gates at intervals. He and his entourage were pursuing the fleeing Ababukusu warriors as part of a punitive expedition to retrieve stolen or bartered guns from the natives and as a show of force. Along the way, they captured any of the Bukusu who hid or attempted to flee. Many Bukusu also perished when they tried to make a desperate crossing through the swollen Kuywa river

== Course ==
For two consecutive days before the attack, commissioner Charles Hobley and his force were carrying out the risky crossings across the swollen Nzoia River. On 20th April, the main attack on the fort came. Recognising the futlity of continued fighting, the Bukusu and Tachoni warriors at the fort released their cattle as an offering to Hobley and his men, but the peace gesture was not noticed, especially amidst the heavy gun fire. The cattle appeared bewildered and ran back to the fort. Heavy Hotchkiss and Maxim gunfire started pounding the fortress at about 12 noon. A storming party of Baganda was organized supported by a half company of Sudanese, the nearest gate was shelled and a section of the mud wall on each side of the gate was undercut by machine-gun fire, until it collapsed. An advance was then ordered. The Baganda and Sudanese stormed the breach with great dash, but once amongst the crowded huts the advantage of their fire was lost, hence the Bukusu conducted a successful counterattack, driving them out of the fort, killing and injuring many of them, including two officers. Grant, Sitwell and Charles took control of the situation and instead of attacking right through the middle of the fort, they fought their way along the inside of the walls, opening fresh gates as they were reached. As each gate was opened, a contingent of forces poured out, then shot the survivors up until the whole resistance was put down. Charles himself was almost killed in the confrontation by a charging warrior, only saved by a lucky shot from Sitwell's revolver.

== Aftermath and legacy ==
The battle effectively ended the Ababukusu resistance and the Lumboka-Chetambe war, confirming British ascendancy in the region and annexation of the Bukusu and Tachoni Land into the British empire.Nabongo Mumia of the Wanga Kingdom was also confirmed as the Paramount Chief of all of western region by the British after this.At the fort, 450 Bukusu and 37 Tachoni were killed, In contrast, commissioner Charles lost only 91 men in the battle, including 2 Sudanese officers. The site of the battle itself became a national monument for Kenya, symbolizing resistance to colonial rule.
