= Masaba =

Masaba or Masab may refer to:

- the Masaba people, of Uganda
- the Masaba language, their Bantu language
- Masab, a peak of Mount Elgon, east Africa
- Masaba Gupta (born 1989), an Indian fashion designer
  - Masaba Masaba, an Indian TV series starring Gupta
