= Lusaka (disambiguation) =

Lusaka is the capital of Zambia.

Lusaka may also refer to:

- Lusaka Province, one of the ten provinces of Zambia
  - Lusaka District, a district of Lusaka Province
  - Lusaka Central, a constituency of Lusaka District
- Roman Catholic Archdiocese of Lusaka, Zambia
- Diocese of Lusaka, Zambia, an Anglican bishopric
- University of Lusaka, Lusaka, Zambia
- Lusaka Open, a men's golf tournament from 1969 to 1979, played in Lusaka, Zambia
- Kenneth Lusaka (born 1963), Kenyan politician
- Paul J. F. Lusaka (1935–1996), Zambian politician and diplomat, President of the United Nations General Assembly in 1984
