= Malava forest =

Forest in Kenya

Malava forest is a tropical rainforest in Kakamega County, Kenya. It covers an extensive area of about 10 hectares straddling the Kakamega-Webuye road. It has monkey species that have learned to coexist 'peacefully' with the natives there. The forest has paths leading through it giving anyone who wishes to 'interact with nature'.
