= East Africa Natural History Society =

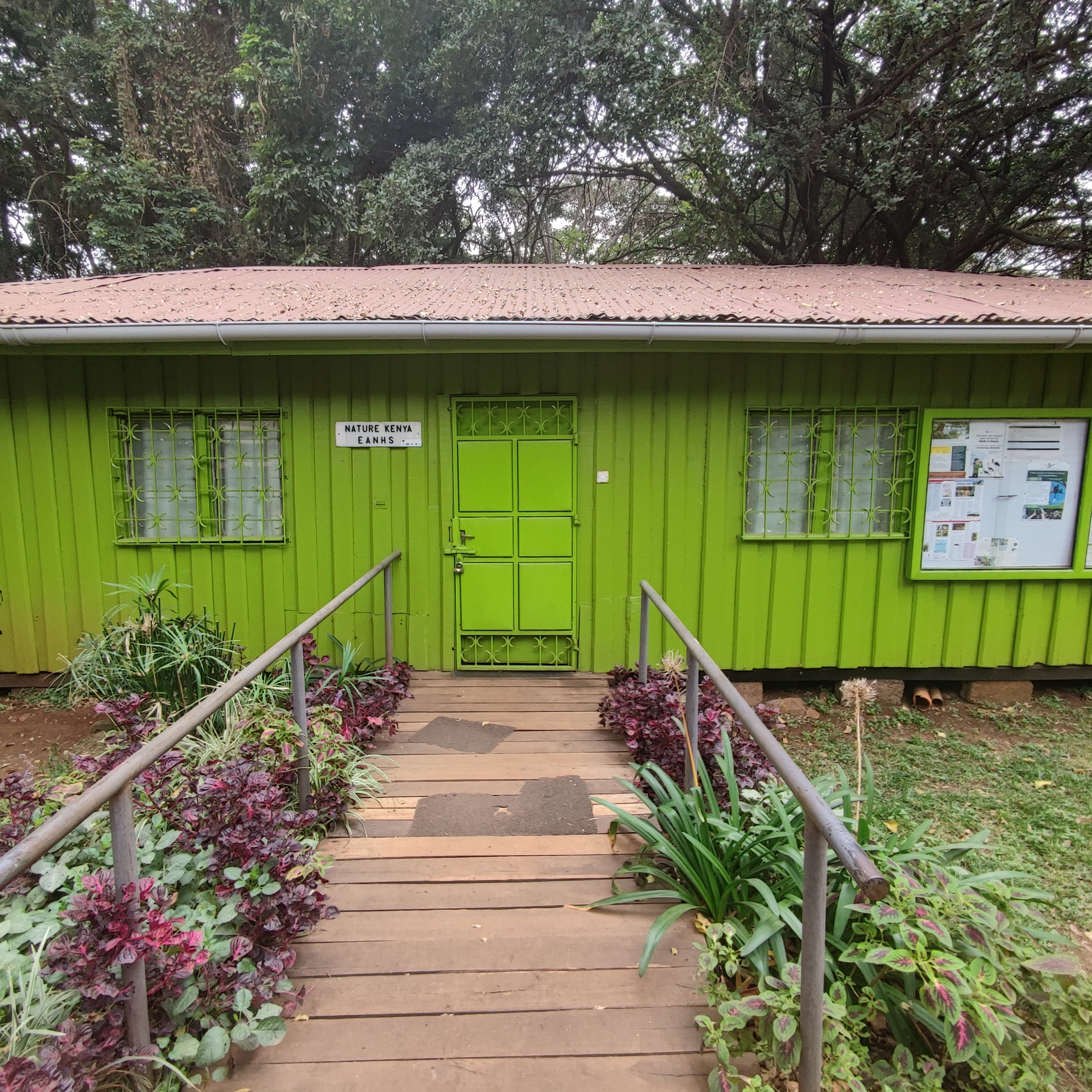
Office of the EANHS, Nairobi, 2025

The East Africa Natural History Society (EANHS) is a natural history study organization founded in 1909 in Kenya with an office in Uganda in what was then British East Africa. The original name was East Africa and Uganda Natural History Society. Following the separation of the countries, the Kenyan organization renamed itself as Nature Kenya - East Africa Natural History Society. It produces the Journal of the East Africa Natural History Society and was involved in establishing a natural history collection that is now part of the Nairobi National Museum which is now managed by the Kenyan government.

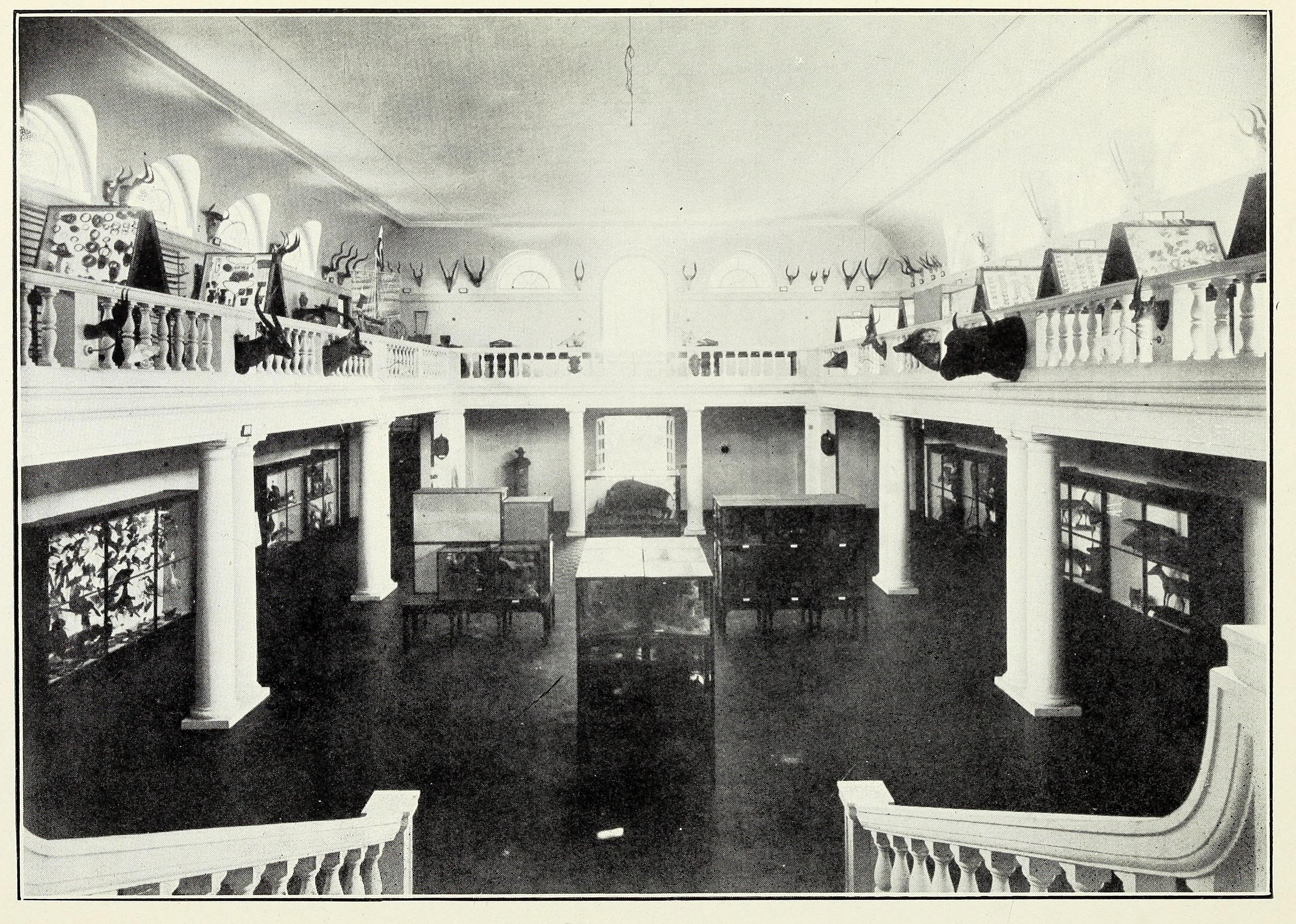
Gallery of the Coryndon museum in 1929

The EANHS was founded by British colonial officials with an interest in the local wildlife. The inaugural meeting was held in the home of Frederick John Jackson on 25th March 1909. Charles William Hobley who had worked with the British East Africa Chartered Company was one of the founding members and he had a special interest in anthropology, linguistics and geology. Other early contributors included Edward Battiscombe (c. 1875-1971), Rev. K. St. Aubyn Rogers, and Cecil Hoey. The founding curator was entomologist T. J. Anderson and the honorary society was John Sergeant of the Public Works Department. They established a collection of natural history specimens, chiefly of birds in 1920 as the Coryndon Memorial Museum. The honorary curator of the museum from 1930 was Victor Van Someren. It was transferred to the Government of Kenya in 1939. This was later made a part of the National Museums of Kenya, following the passage of the Museums and Heritage Act 2006. The society produces a scientific journal since 1910 which is now published in collaboration with the National Museums of Kenya. The organization is now involved in conservation and conservation education. From 1971, the society runs Wednesday birdwatching walks in Nairobi, an activity started by Fleur Ng'weno. Nature Kenya collaborates with BirdLife International on bird conservation.

In 2010, a centenary commemorative stamp was issued by Kenya featuring a golden-rumped sengi.
