= Agogwe =

East African humanoid cryptid

The agogwe is an alleged human-like biped reported in East Africa. Eyewitnesses claimed that the creature stands at a height of only 1.2 to 1.5 m (4 to 5 ft), and possesses brown or russet hair.

== Sightings ==
=== William Hichens ===
The first recorded sighting was by Captain William Hichens, reported in the December 1937 edition of the journal Discovery:

Some years ago I was sent on an official lion-hunt in this area (the Ussure and Simibit forests on the western side of the Wembare plains) and, while waiting in a forest glade for a man-eater, I saw two small, brown, furry creatures come from dense forest on one side of the glade and disappear into the thickets on the other. They were like little men, about 4 feet high, walking upright, but clad in russet hair. The native hunter with me gazed in mingled fear and amazement. They were, he said, agogwe, the little furry men whom one does not see once in a lifetime.

=== Cuthbert Burgoyne ===
The next year, vintner Cuthbert Burgoyne, son of P. B. Burgoyne, wrote a letter to the journal describing a similar sighting in 1927:

In 1927 I was with my wife coasting Portuguese East Africa in a Japanese cargo boat. We were sufficiently near to land to see objects clearly with a glass of twelve magnifications. There was a sloping beach with light bush above upon which several dozen baboons where hunting for and picking up shell fish or crabs, to judge by their movements. Two pure white baboons were amongst them. These are very rare but I had heard of them previously. As we watched, two little brown men walked together out of the bush and down amongst the baboons. They were certainly not any known monkey and yet they must have been akin or they would have disturbed the baboons. They were too far away to be seen in great detail, but these small human-like animals were probably between four and five feet tall, quite upright and graceful in figure. At the time I was thrilled as they were quite evidently no beast of which I had heard or read. Later a friend and big game hunter told me he was in Portuguese East Africa with his wife and three other hunters, and saw mother, father and child, of apparently similar animal species, walk across the further side of a bush clearing. The natives loudly forbade him to shoot.

== Modern perspective ==
There is no physical evidence for the Agogwe. There also have not been any further sightings since 1927. Both men believed that what they saw could have been a monkey.

== See also ==
- Nandi bear
- Dingonek
