= Nandi bear =

Creature from east African folklore

Nandi Bear
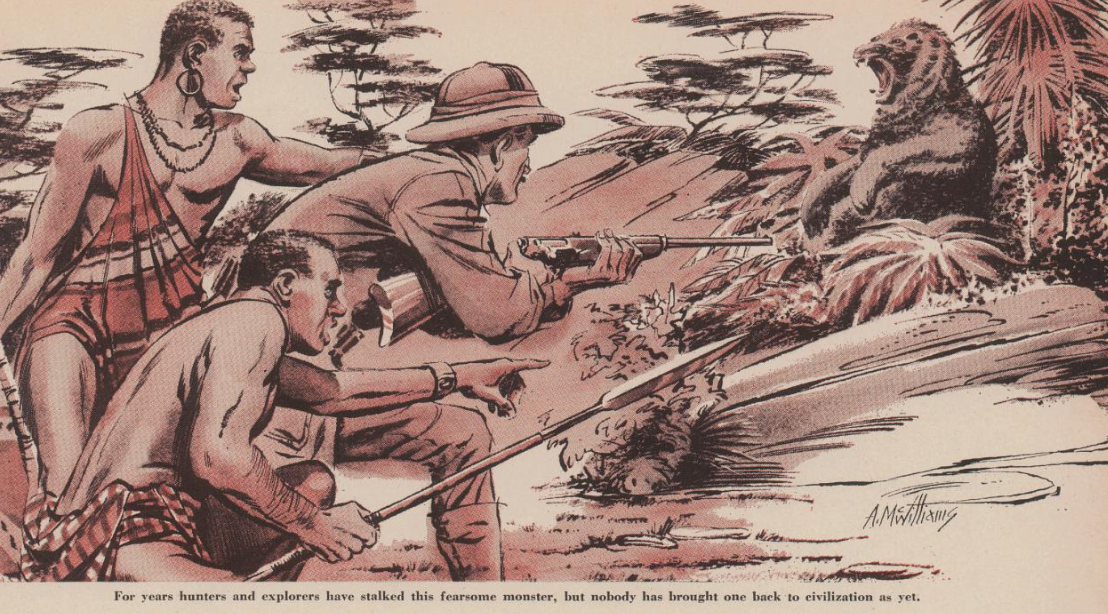
- Nandi bear illustration (1961)

Creature information
- Other name(s): Chemosit, Kerit, Koddoelo, Ngoelo, Ngoloko, Duba
- Sub grouping: Bear

Origin
- Region: East Africa

The Nandi bear is a cryptid purported to live in East Africa. It takes its name from the Nandi people, who live in western Kenya, the area in which the alleged animal has been reported. It is also known as Chemosit, Kerit, Koddoelo, Ngoloko, or Duba, which derives from the Arabic words dubb ("bear") or d.abʕ / d.abuʕ ("hyena"). The Samburu Nkampit also appears to be a version of this creature.

Scientists tend to dismiss the existence of the Nandi bear, arguing instead that such accounts are misinterpreted encounters with known animals; nevertheless, a variety of highly speculative, non-mainstream proposals have been offered in an attempt to identify the creature.

== Description ==
Descriptions of the Nandi bear are of a ferocious, powerfully built carnivore with a sloping back and front shoulders reaching a height in excess of 1.2 m (4 ft). Stories further highlight its apparent danger to both humans and wildlife, and depict it as a nocturnal animal capable of standing on its hind legs. In 1914, Charles William Hobley authored a diagram of a footprint attributed to a Nandi bear.

The Nandi people call it kerit. Local legend holds the Nandi bear has reddish hair, long feet, and is said to scalp people. In 1961, Gardner Soule noted sightings were reported in Kenya throughout the 19th and early 20th centuries, but further stated that it "never has been caught or identified". Sightings of the Nandi bear decreased with time. In 1905, Richard Meinertzhagen speculated the creature may have been an "anthropoid ape now extinct on account of decreased rainfall."

== Scientific evaluation ==
There is no scientific evidence supporting the existence of the Nandi bear. Alleged sightings are suggested to be misidentifications of known species.

In 1923, Charles William Andrews suggested the Nandi bear may be a surviving representative of the extinct Chalicothere. In the 1930s, Louis Leakey also suggested Nandi bear descriptions matched the Chalicothere, though those extinct creatures were herbivores. The Chalicothere hypothesis was widely abandoned by the close of the 20th century, with palaeontologist Louis L. Jacobs commenting: "if chalicotheres existed now, they would have been found out just like the giant forest hog was." He concluded that "if there is anything to the Nandi bear story besides imagination, I suspect it may be the word-of-mouth description of gorillas passed across the continent from areas where they live to areas where they do not."

Zoologist Reginald Innes Pocock claimed reports of the Nandi bear were misidentified hyenas, specifically the spotted hyena. In 1932, the British Natural History Museum stated many reports of the Nandi bear have "proved to have been nothing more than a spotted hyena." Similarly, palaeontologist George Gaylord Simpson commented how the Nandi bear "turned out to be in most if not all cases a ratel [honey-badger], an animal which had been known to scientific zoologists since 1776."

== In popular culture ==
- The Nandi bear (spelt 'Nandibear') appears as a monster in the Fighting Fantasy gamebook series.
- The Peculiar Exploits of Brigadier Ffellowes, a collection of contemporary fantasy stories by Sterling E. Lanier, includes a short story called "His Only Safari", in which the title character briefly sights a kerit and speculates that such creatures formed the basis for the Egyptian legends of Anubis.
- Tarzan #134 (Gold Key Comics, March 1963) features Tarzan meeting and later battling a Nandi bear, which is pictured as a shaggy sloth bear-like creature with floppy ears.
- Pathfinder Roleplaying Game, a fantasy role-playing game published in 2009 by Paizo Publishing, features the Chemosit, a fantastical creature inspired by Nandi bear stories.
- The daily comic panel True-Life Adventures featured the Nandi bear for its 22 May 1956 installment.

== See also ==
- Agogwe
- Dingonek
