= Bungoma =

- Town
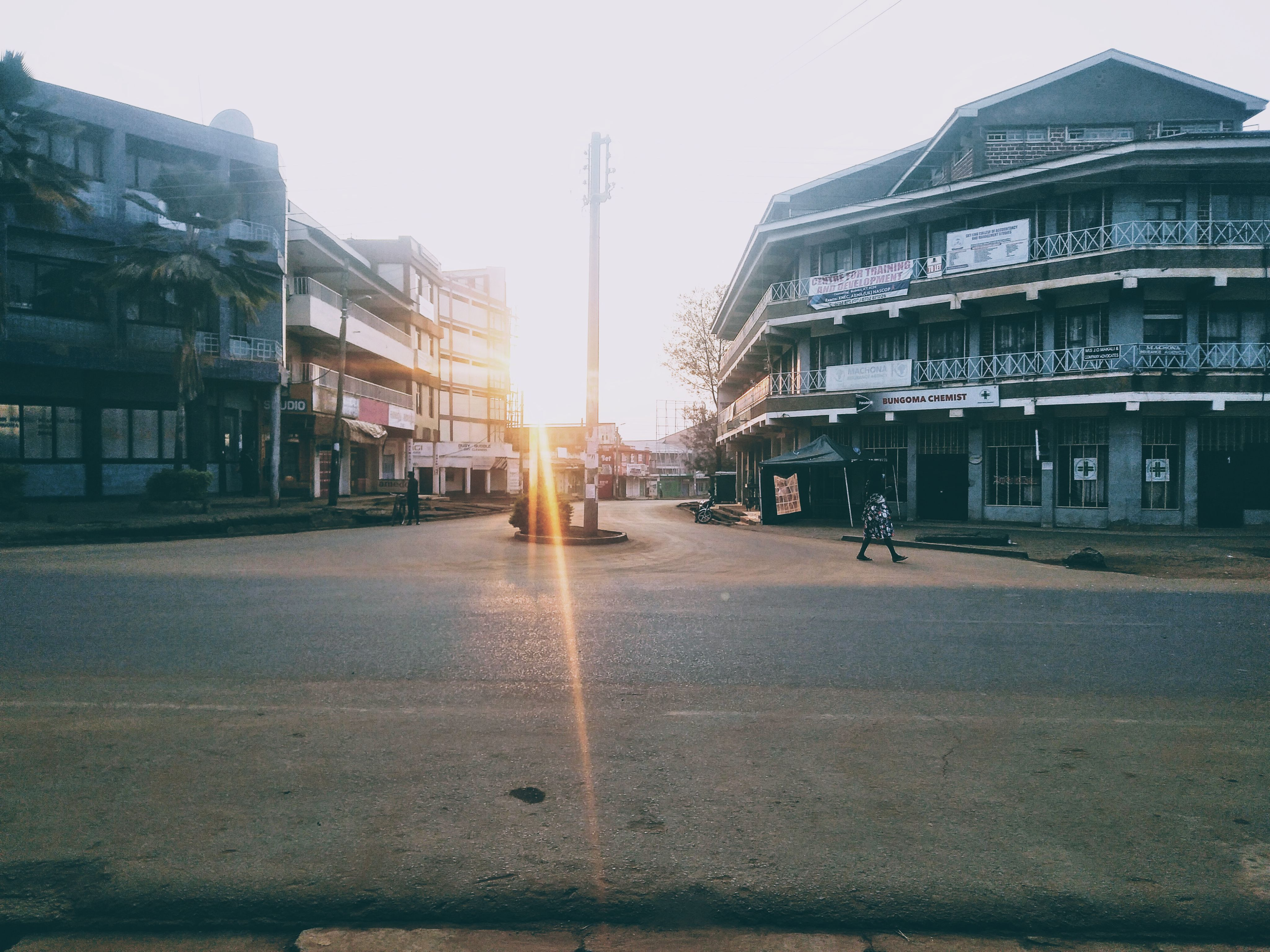
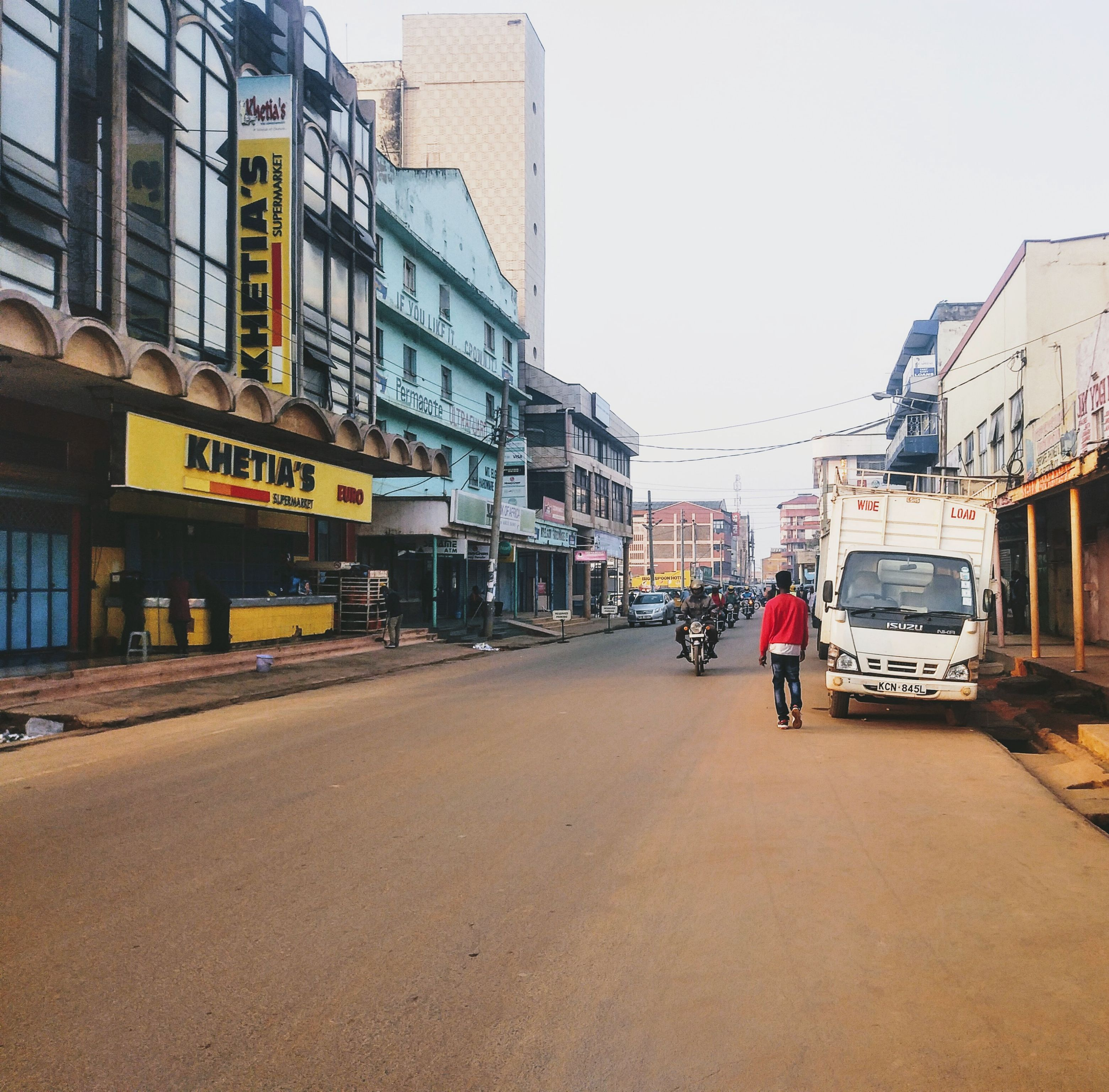
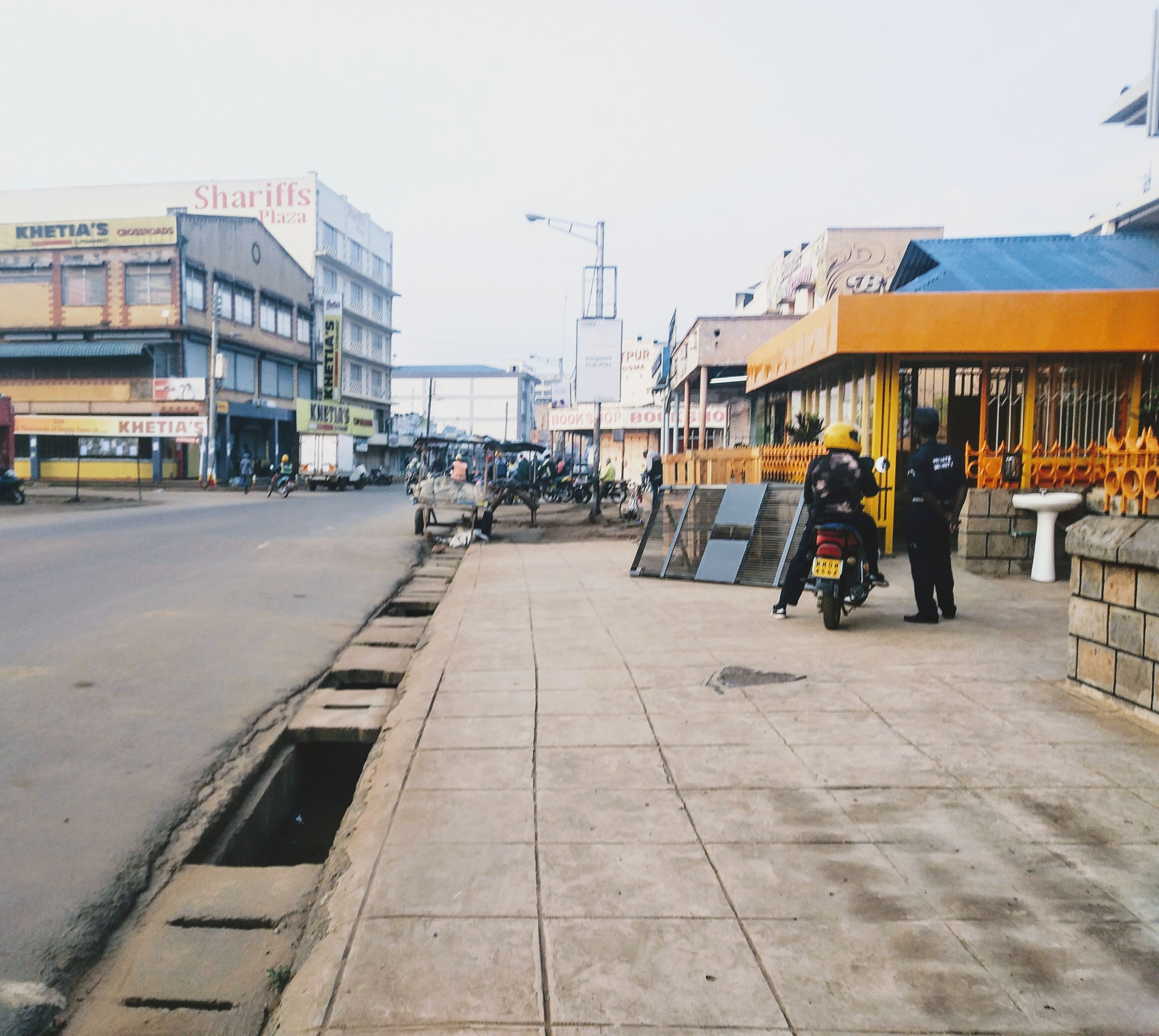
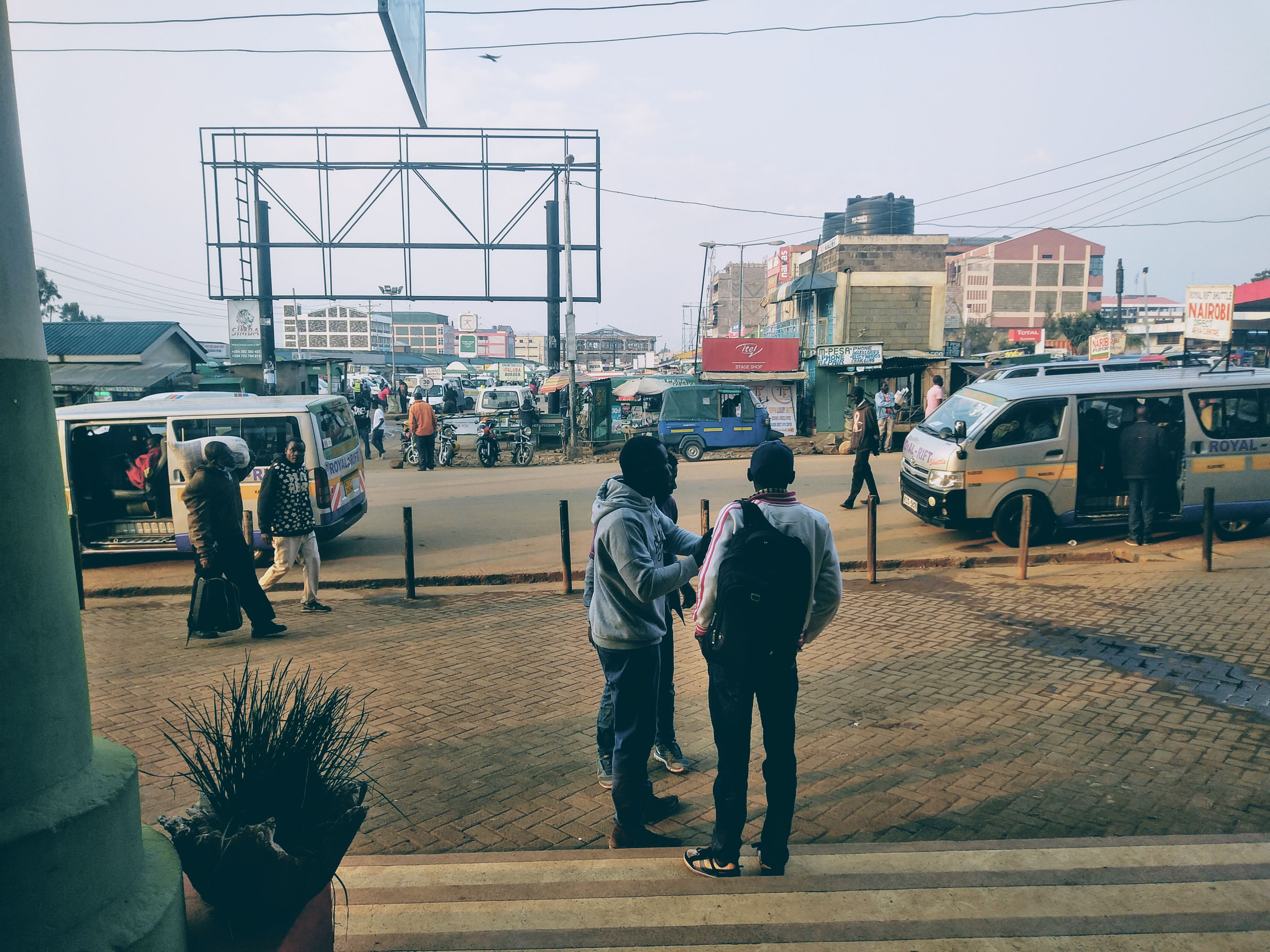
- Clockwise from top: Church street, Khetias Crossroads, Bungoma bus park, Kenyatta Avenue.

- Location in Kenya
- Coordinates: 00°34′00″N 34°34′00″E
- Country: Kenya
- County: Bungoma County
- Elevation: 4,544 ft (1,385 m)

Population (2019 Census)
  - Total: 68,031
- Time zone: UTC+3 (EAT)
- Postal code: 50200
- Area code: 039
- Climate: Am

Bungoma town is the capital of Bungoma County in Kenya. It was established as a trading center in the early 20th century. It is located in Kenya's Western region at the foot of Mount Elgon, Kenya's second-highest mountain. The town and the surrounding areas have one of Kenya's highest average rainfalls, making Bungoma one of the nation's most important food baskets.

== Name ==
Bungoma was named from Bong'omek tribe of the Kalenjin community. The Bong'omek community inhabited the area now known as Bungoma.

The Bungomek were later driven out by the Bukusu, but the name Bungoma, in reference to their occupation, remained.

== Economy ==
Farming is the main economic activity in the county. Bungoma County is dependent on sugarcane farming, with one of the country's largest sugar factories as well as numerous small-holder sugar mills. Maize is also grown for subsistence, alongside pearl millet and sorghum. Dairy farming is widely practiced, as well as the raising of poultry. There is a small but important tourist circuit, centering on the biennial circumcision ceremonies that are mostly practiced by the Bukusu, Tachoni and Sabaot peoples.

Aside from sugar processing, the town also contains various other manufacturing plants such as maize mills, large bakeries, dairy plants and a plastic factory. Other smaller-scale manufacturing activities include steel crafting, iron sheet production, garages and auto repairs.

There is a retail sector consisting of local businesses, banks, insurance companies and large hotels supporting the local tourist industry.

== Overview ==
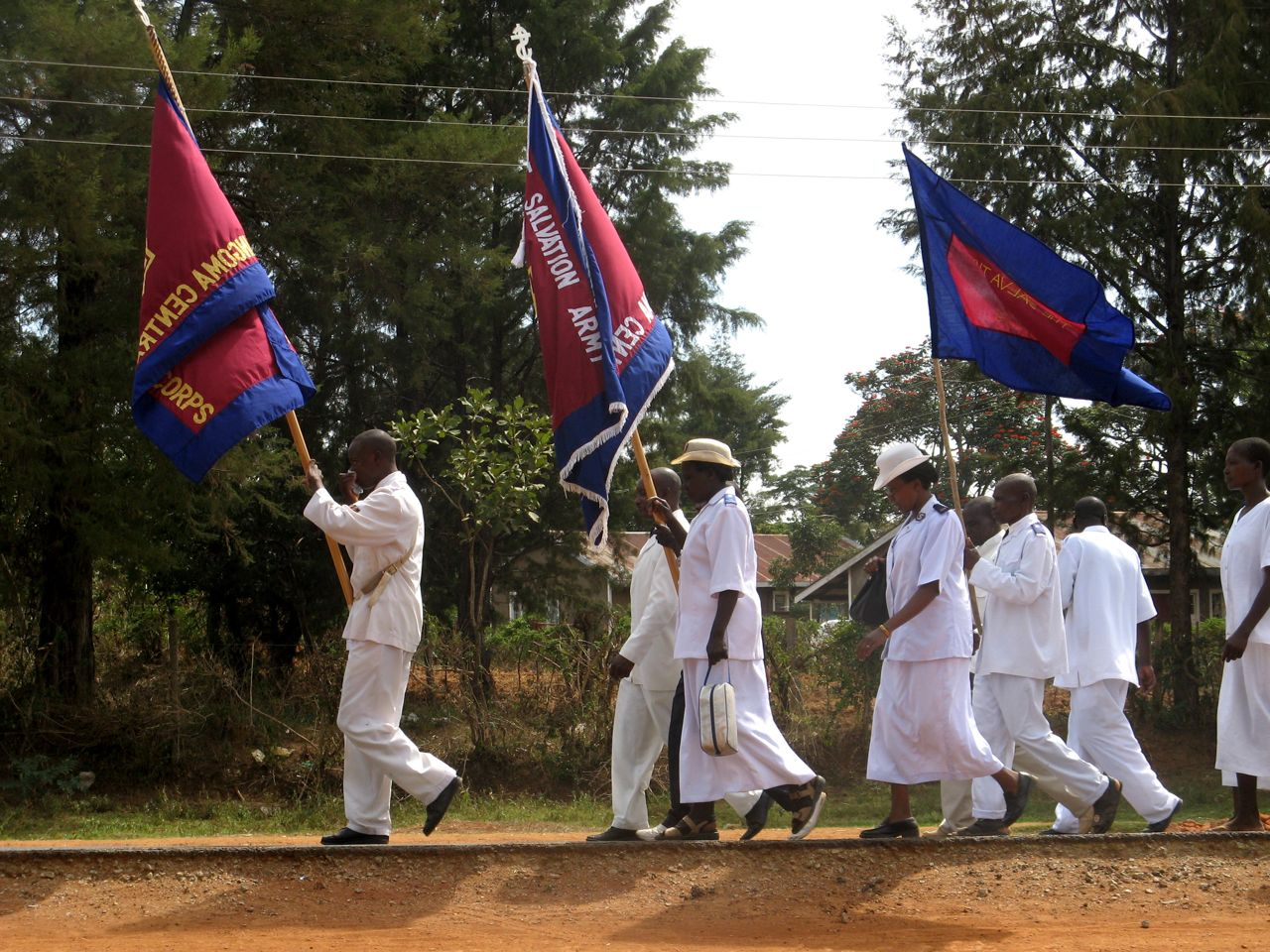
Salvation Army in Bungoma

The major economic activity in the area is sugarcane farming. This is because more than 67000 farmers directly depend on Nzoia Sugar Company Ltd. Early businesses were supported by the Kenya-Uganda Railway which passes through the town. The collapse of Webuye paper mills and the struggling Nzoia Sugar Company has led to an economic nightmare in the county. Malakisi Ginnery that solely depends on cotton farming in Bungoma County and neighboring counties like Busia has struggled for ages to stand on its feet because of inadequate cotton supplies and few people have embraced cotton farming. Within Malikisi town, British America Tobacco (BAT) also had a well-established leaf buying also contributed and supported the inhabitants of part of Bungoma County that initially had embraced Tobacco farming. Most of the people previously employed there have looked for other jobs while some have totally relocated to other counties.

Major tertiary educational institutions include the Sang'alo Institute of Science and Technology, Mabanga Farmer's training center, SACRED Training Institute, Kibabii University and The Friends School Kamusinga.

The Governor of Bungoma, Kenneth Lusaka, was elected in the 2022 election; he succeeded Wycliffe Wangamati, elected in 2017. Previously the mayor of Bungoma town was Barasa Mbinga of Ford-Kenya, who beat the previous mayor Majimbo Okumu of ODM in the 2009 mayoral election, voted by the Bungoma councilors. The senator of Bungoma is Hon. David Wafula Wakoli.

== See also ==
- Railway stations in Kenya
