= Victor Van Someren =

Australian entomologist

Victor Gurner Logan Van Someren (6 October 1886, Melbourne – 24 July 1976) was a zoologist and entomologist who worked in Kenya as a medical officer. He was keenly interested in birds and natural history and served as a curator at the Coryndon Museum in Nairobi, Kenya, and as an editor of the Journal of the East African Natural History Society.

== Life and work ==
Van Someren was born in Melbourne, Australia, the fourth son of R. G. van Someren who was Singapore lawyer. He grew up in Malaysia before moving to Scotland with his mother. He attended George Watson's College and studied zoology at University of Edinburgh while graduating in medicine and dental surgery. Van Someren moved to Kenya in 1912 to serve as a medical officer in British East Africa and lived in Nairobi. He was interested in African birds and his brother R. A. L. van Someren who was in the Uganda Medical Service had been collecting birds since 1906. Together they published on the birds of the region. He was in the East Africa and Uganda Natural History Society and became Honorary Secretary. In 1930 he became Curator of the Coryndon Museum. Van Someren described a number of new bird and butterfly species. He collected specimens, sometimes making use of networks of trained Africans and he sent specimens to the Royal Scottish Museum, Edinburgh, the collections of Lord Rothschild (which are now divided between 6500 specimens at Natural History Museum, Tring and the rest at the Field Museum of Natural History, Chicago). Some 17000 specimens are also held at the Royal Museum for Central Africa. He collaborated with specialists on a wide range of taxa including mammals, birds, insects and plants. He sent nearly 300,000 insect specimens to the British Museum and published extensively on the butterflies of Africa with reviews on genera such as Charaxes. In 1956 he wrote a book Days with Birds. His son Gurner Robert Cunningham "Chum" van Someren (1913-1997) also became an ornithologist of repute. He illustrated birds for his books and also took photographs. Some of the cabinets in the Nairobi National Museum were made by him. He retired in 1932.

Van Someren became a member of the East Africa and Uganda Natural History Society in 1911, becoming its honorary curator in 1914. He was involved in raising money for the Coryndon Memorial Museum which he directed from 1938. He edited the journal from 1925 to 1939. He moved to live in 1940 to Karen, Kenya. He was involved in the establishment of Nairobi National Park.

In 1922 the University of Lund awarded him the Anders Jahan Retzius Medal. Species named after him include the fish Labeobarbus somereni.

== Works ==
- Bird Life in Uganda
- Notes on Birds of Uganda and East Africa
- with Thomas Herbert Elliot Jackson, 1952 The Charaxes etheocles-ethalion complex: a tentative reclassification of the group (Lepidoptera: Nymphalidae). Transactions of the Royal Entomological Society of London 103:257–284.
- with Jackson, T.H.E., 1957 The Charaxes etheocles-ethalion complex (Lepidoptera: Nymphalidae). Supplement No. 1. Annals of the Transvaal Museum 23:41–58.
- Revisional Notes on the African Charaxes. Pts 1–10 (1963–1975) 652 pages 148 plates.
  - 1963 Revisional notes on African Charaxes (Lepidoptera: Nymphalidae). Part I. Bulletin of the British Museum (Natural History) (Entomology) 195–242.
  - 1964 Revisional notes on African Charaxes (Lepidoptera: Nymphalidae). Part II. Bulletin of the British Museum (Natural History) (Entomology) 181–235.
  - 1966 Revisional notes on African Charaxes (Lepidoptera: Nymphalidae). Part III. Bulletin of the British Museum (Natural History) (Entomology) 45–101.
  - 1967 Revisional notes on African Charaxes (Lepidoptera: Nymphalidae). Part IV. Bulletin of the British Museum (Natural History) (Entomology) 277–316.
  - 1969 Revisional notes on African Charaxes (Lepidoptera: Nymphalidae). Part V. Bulletin of the British Museum (Natural History) (Entomology) 75–166.
  - 1970 Revisional notes on African Charaxes (Lepidoptera: Nymphalidae). Part VI. Bulletin of the British Museum (Natural History) (Entomology) 197–250.
  - 1971 Revisional notes on African Charaxes (Lepidoptera: Nymphalidae). Part VII. Bulletin of the British Museum (Natural History) (Entomology) 181–226.
  - 1972 Revisional notes on African Charaxes (Lepidoptera: Nymphalidae). Part VIII. Bulletin of the British Museum (Natural History) (Entomology) 215–264.
  - 1974 Revisional notes on African Charaxes (Lepidoptera: Nymphalidae). Part IX. Bulletin of the British Museum of Natural History (Entomology) 29 (8):415–487.
  - 1975 Revisional notes on African Charaxes, Palla and Euxanthe (Lepidoptera: Nymphalidae). Part X. Bulletin of the British Museum of Natural History (Entomology) 32 (3):65–136.
