= George Barasa =

Activist and artist

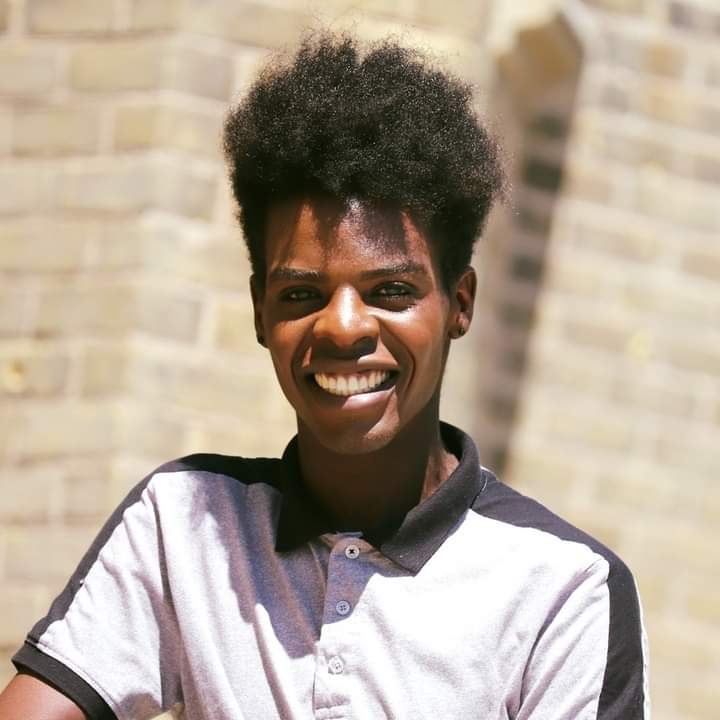
- Born: c. 1990; Nairobi, Kenya

George Barasa is a Kenyan artist, musician, singer, and LGBTQ+ and human rights activist in exile in Canada. Barasa worked as an intern at Centre for Human Rights and as a social media manager at AMSHeR in South Africa. He is currently an undergraduate student at York University for Human Rights and Equity program

== Early years and career ==
George Barasa was born in 1990 in Nairobi, Kenya, and raised in Bungoma, a town located in Bungoma County. As a gospel musician and singer & is well known for making an appearance in an LGBTIQ song Same Love Remix by Art Attack. Barasa performed under the stage name Joji Baro. In August 2013 Jojibaro was featured on the cover of The Wire magazine while he was an activist at Out in Kenya. He co-founded the first LGBTIQ church in Kenya a year later after leaving OiK. He was appointed Kuchu Times Kenya Correspondent in 2015. Later on, Barasa was named key people fighting homophobia and transphobia in Africa by Huffpost, featured in a photo exhibition "Love is not a crime" in Bilbao, Spain by Amnesty International, Nominated and finalist of David Kato Vision and Visual-Kaleidoscope Award 2016. After appearing in the first gay music video from Kenya the now banned viral Same Love (remix) of Macklemore song, he feared for his life was in danger and fled to South Africa which promptly rejected him before he found refuge in Canada where he is now in exile. most recently a recipient of Poz-TO

== Personal life ==
On May 14, 2011, The Star disclosed George Barasa's sexual orientation and allegations of dating a Catholic priest., unofficially and forcefully as a gay man. Joji Baro eventually came out as the first gay to revealed that he was HIV-positive in Kenya on K24. As of January 2023 the video clip of his coming out had been removed after over 58,000 views on YouTube.
