= Borioba =

Village in Kenya

Coordinates: 0.48°S 35.02°E

Borioba is a village located at Magwagwa sub location, Borangi Location, Nyamusi division, Ekerenyo sub county, Nyamira County, south Eastern of Nyanza region, Kenya. The village is well known through its diverse and intensive farming activities. The major crops in this area include pineapples, bananas, maize, passion, fruit bees keeping, poultry and beans. The Sondu Miriu Hydro power plant is also set to start at this village, making it more productive locally and around the world. Due to the unity among the people of Boriba, the capacity to its success is empowered and triggered.

It is bordered by the Kalenjin community with river Sondu (Sondu Miriu) serving as the boundary. There are three major languages used in this area namely Ekegusii, Swahili, and English. In 1991, the community started it first and the only school (Geturi primary school) a school that has been constantly shining academically and sports in both local and national boundaries.
