= Dini Ya Msambwa =

African traditional religion

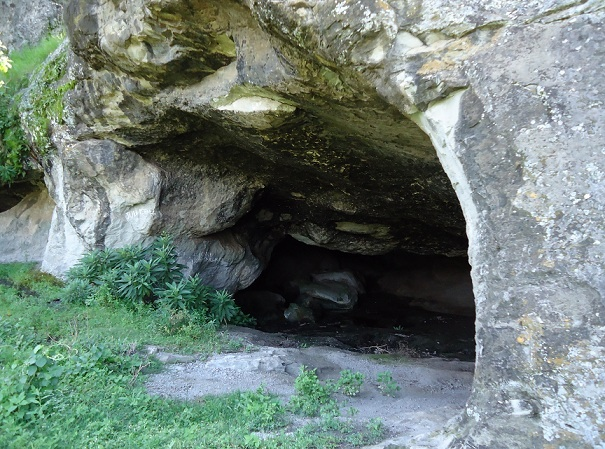
Masaba cave shrine

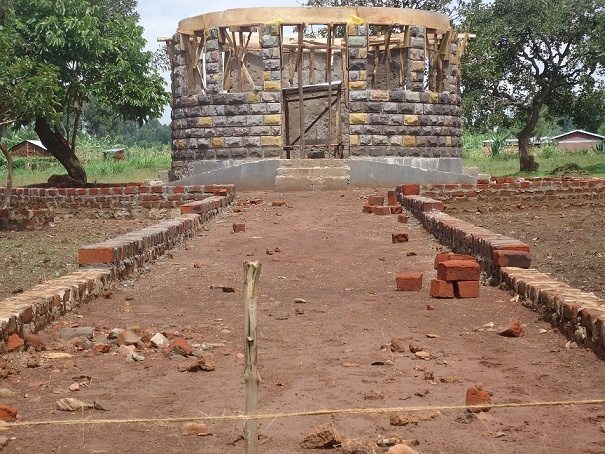
Shrine of Elijah Masinde

'Dini ya Msambwa (Religion of the Ancestor) is an African traditional religion and political movement that has been labeled an anti-colonial religion. It is practiced primarily among the Luhya people of western Kenya.

== History ==
Dini ya Msambwa stood against colonialism during the British colonial rule of Kenya. Among other things, it criticized the undermining, by the British colonial government, of elder authority and of the cultural values that had held Kenyan peoples together for ages.

The first European to reach the Bukusu was Joseph Thomson, who upon arriving in 1883, found the Bukusu living in fortified villages surrounded by moats. These were a protection against raids from the Uasin Gishu people and the Teso people. British administration was established in North Nyanza in 1894. The following year the Bukusu killed 25 soldiers of the Sudanese garrison and a punitive expedition was undertaken against them. Their fortified villages were stormed by Sudanese troops and Africans from other tribes, and the fighting ended when the Bukusu acknowledged British rule and promised to abandon their villages. Today they live in scattered homesteads.

The old authority of the tribal elders had been undermined with the advent of colonial rule. It was the elders in turn who had lent power to the old tribal religion or African traditional religion and hence it too was also undermined. Left in a spiritual vacuum, many Bukusu and Luhya, insecure in the rapidly-changing world, gravitated naturally into Christianity. Masinde, being an elder, refused to convert.

The religion was founded by Elijah Masinde in 1936. After Kenyan independence in 1968, Dini ya Msambwa was declared illegal and Masinde was arrested for fomenting hatred of the Christian religion. Dini Ya Msambwa takes the form of an African traditional religion; its followers worshipping through ancestral Spirits (known as Msambwa) in shrines. The veneration of ancestors is an important part of the religion.
