= Edgar Beecher Bronson =

American rancher, photographer & author (1856–1917)

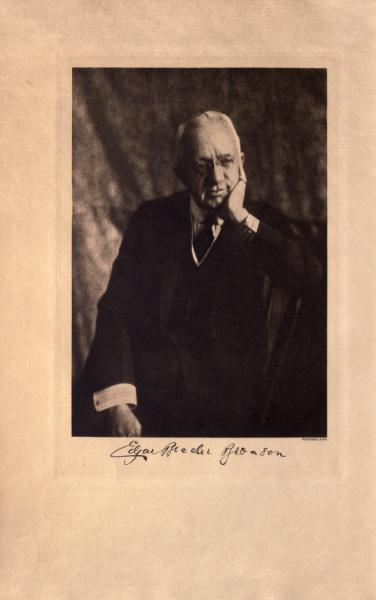
Edgar Beecher Bronson, ca. 1917

Edgar Beecher Bronson (1856–1917) was a Nebraska rancher, a West Texas cattleman, an African big-game hunter, a serious photographer and starting late in life, an author of fiction and personal memoirs. As he matured as a writer, his works showed a "marked advance...in characterization".

Bronson was a nephew of famed abolitionist Henry Ward Beecher. Formerly a reporter for the New York Tribune, Bronson headed west in 1877 to learn the cattle business under the directive of Clarence King — first director of the United States Geological Survey and owner of large mining and cattle operations in the American West. Bronson worked for one season in Wyoming before starting his own ranch with 716 cows with calves. Bronson chose Sioux County, Nebraska for the site of his first ranch.

== Bibliography ==
- Reminiscences of a Ranchman (1908)
- The Red-Blooded Heroes of the Frontier (1910)
- In Closed Territory (1910) - about Africa, with over 100 photos
- The Vanguard (1914)
- The Love of Loot and Women (1917) - published posthumously
