= Ikonge =

- Location within Kenya
- Coordinates: 0.53°S 35.02°E
- Country: Kenya
- County: Nyamira North Sub-County, Nyamira County
- Time zone: UTC+3 (EAT)

Ikonge is a settlement in Kenya's Nyanza Province.

As of 2019, it has a close to 15, 000 population and is in the process of bringing significant social and economical reforms.
