= Barasa acronyctoides =

Scientific classification
- Kingdom: Animalia
- Phylum: Arthropoda
- Clade: Pancrustacea
- Class: Insecta
- Order: Lepidoptera
- Superfamily: Noctuoidea
- Family: Nolidae
- Genus: Barasa
- Species: B. acronyctoides

Binomial name
- Barasa acronyctoides Walker, 1862

Synonyms
- Barasa cana Hampson, 1893; Sarrothripa caradrinoides Snellen, 1879

Species of moth

Barasa acronyctoides is a moth of the family Nolidae first described by Francis Walker in 1862. It is found in Oriental region and east to Sulawesi and Fiji.

== Description ==
Forewings ashy gray with round apex. A linear black fasciae present. Some tufts of raised scales can be found on the distal area. The male can be identified by conspicuous black hair-pencil. The caterpillar is oblong and flattened. Head bright reddish orange and heart shaped. Legs and prolegs are also orange. Body chocolate brown with pink lateral areas. Caterpillars generally found on the underside of the leaf. Pupation occurs in a cocoon attached to a twig or a branch.

Larval host plant is Eugenia.
