= Masaba language =

Bantu language spoken in East Africa

Masaba
- Lumasaba
- Native to: Uganda
- Region: Eastern Uganda, south of the Kupsabiny, Bugisu Province
- Ethnicity: Masaba, Luhya
- Native speakers: 2.7 million (2002 & 2009 censuses)
- Language family: Niger–Congo?: Atlantic–Congo; Volta-Congo; Benue–Congo; Bantoid; Southern Bantoid; Bantu; Northeast Bantu; Great Lakes Bantu; Masaba–Luhya (J.30); Masaba
- Dialects: Gisu; Kisu; Bukusu; Syan; Tachoni; Dadiri; Buya

Language codes
- ISO 639-3: Variously: myx – Masaba (Gisu, Kisu, Dadiri, Buya) bxk – Bukusu (Tachoni) lts – Tachoni
- Glottolog: masa1299 Masaaba buku1249 Bukusu tach1242 Tachoni
- Guthrie code: JE.31

Masaba (Lumasaaba), sometimes known as Gisu (Lugisu) after one of its dialects, is a Bantu language spoken by more than two million people in East Africa. The Gisu dialect in eastern Uganda is mutually intelligible with Bukusu, spoken by ethnic Luhya in western Kenya. Masaba is the local name of Mount Elgon and the name of the son of the ancestor of the Gisu tribe. Like other Bantu languages, Lumasaba nouns are divided into several sets of noun classes. These are similar to the genders in Germanic and Romance languages, except that instead of the usual two or three, there are around eighteen different noun classes. The language has a quite complex verb morphology.

== Varieties ==
Varieties of Masaba are as follows:

- Gisu (Lugisu)
- Kisu
- Bukusu (Lubukusu; ethnic Luhya)
- Syan
- Tachoni (Lutachoni; ethnic Luhya)
- Dadiri (Ludadiri)
- Buya (Lubuya)

Dadiri is spoken in the north, Gisu in the center, and Buya in the center and south of Masaba territory in Uganda. Bukusu is spoken in Kenya, separated from ethnic Masaba by Nilotic languages on the border.

== Phonology ==
See Bukusu dialect for details of one variety of Masaba.

=== Consonants ===
		Labial	Alveolar	Palatal	Velar
Nasal		m	n		ŋ
Plosive	voiceless	p	t		k
Plosive	voiced	b	d		g
Fricative	voiceless	f	s		
Fricative	voiced	β	z		
Approximant		(w)	l	j	

- Sounds /k, ɡ, ŋ/ when before front vowels /i, e/ are heard as palatal [c, ɟ, ɲ].
- Sounds /i, u/ may be heard as glides [w, j] within initial vowel sequences.

=== Vowels ===
Masaba has a basic 5-vowel system consisting of /i, e, a, o, u/.

== Bibliography ==
- Brown, Gillian (1972) Phonological Rules and Dialectal Variation: A study of the phonology of Lumasaaba ISBN 0-521-08485-7
