= Elijah Masinde =

Bukusu activist

Elijah Masinde (c.1911–1987) was a Bukusu activist.

== Early life ==
Born around 1910 – 1912 in Kimilili, Bungoma District, Masinde wa Nameme okhwa Mwasame was initiated into the Machego age-set. At the time, the Kenya-Uganda railway was passing through Ababukusu land. He began to practice football at a young age, eventually starting out as a footballer and captaining a football team from Kimilili. He also played for the Kenyan national team in the Gossage Cup against Uganda in 1930.

== Career ==
By the early 1940s, he had risen to the rank of a junior elder within his community in Kimilili area, and become increasingly anti-colonial. In 1944, he led a number of localised defiance campaigns against the colonial authorities, and was imprisoned many times as a result. At one time he was put in Mathare Mental Hospital, and on another occasion he was detained in Lamu.

== Detention, old age, and death ==
Upon Kenya's independence, Masinde was detained by the government of Jomo Kenyatta for almost 15 years. He was accused of fomenting religious hatred. He was released by the government of Daniel arap Moi in 1978, however, Moi also arrested him following his clashes with traffic policemen in Webuye and Kitale. Elija Masinde remained defiant and continually questioned post independence Kenya's government, especially on the issue of land distribution and citizen rights. He died in 1987, considered a neglected freedom fighter.

Before his death, Masinde said that one of his relatives had bewitched him. He also described to his elder son where he wanted to be buried: he wanted a huge sycamore tree uprooted to make way for his grave. The family decided to bury him elsewhere, though, but the spot they chose for his grave turned out to be someone else's hidden grave. They took this to be an omen and proceeded to bury him in the spot where the sycamore tree had been.

He left a widow, Sarah Nanyama Masinde. She was still alive in November 2007 and was then reportedly 105 years old.

== See also ==
- Dini Ya Msambwa
