= Jonathan Barasa =

Kenyan chief

Jonathan Wasilwa Barasa (1916 – December 1996) was a Kenyan chief born in Sirisia, in Bungoma County to Wasilwa and Lumbasi. He went to Bitonge School at the age of seven and later Government African School, present-day Kakamega High School. After primary school he was called to Alliance High School. His lack of school fees drove him to Maseno and to train as a teacher under Carey Francis. He married Ruth Nanjala Murumba in the Quaker Church in Bitonge, and they had ten children. He supported hundreds of children by mentoring them, paying their school fees and taking care of them. Barasa was a staunch Quaker who also respected and promoted the Bukusu culture. He was a member of the East African Yearly Meeting of Friends (Quakers).

== Government service and other work ==
In 1947 he was appointed to the North Kavirondo Native Council. In 1950 he was appointed to the African District Council North Kavirondo with among other contemporaries; Senior Chief Laurent Ongoma, Livingstone Naibei, Henry Wanyonyi, Joseph Wafula Khaoya and William Chiuli. In 1952 he was appointed member of the Western Regional Education Board. In 1954 he was appointed member of Nyanza Province Cotton and Lint Marketing Board by the then Agriculture Minister, Bruce Mac Kenzie. In 1965 he was appointed member of the advisory committee for primary and secondary education by the then Minister Njoroge Mungai. In 1969 he was chairman of Mt. Elgon Bungoma District Cooperative Society.

Barasa worked in the civil service between 1945 and 1976. Before he retired from government service in 1976, he had traveled abroad widely, visiting Tanzania, Uganda, England, Scotland, France, Switzerland, the Netherlands, Malta, Egypt, and United States of America.

== Other achievements ==
Among his many achievements is helping to set up Friend School Kamusinga and Lugulu Girls High School. These two schools have impacted the Bukusu especially in the wake of Kenya's independence. He established Namang'ofulo DEB School and Chwele Girls Secondary School. He contributed to the modernization of present-day Bungoma and Busia counties. From the 1940s to the 1990s, he ensured local children received opportunities to attend school.

He is remembered as a Senior Chief, a position he held for many years. He promoted agriculture, soil conservation, home improvement, rain water harvesting and improved health services. He also participated in the translation of the first Bukusu Bible as team leader in the Lubukusu Bible Translation Committee. He died in December 1996.
