= Kavirondo =

Former name of a region and people in East Africa

Kavirondo is the former name of the region surrounding the Kavirondo Gulf (now Winam Gulf) as well as the two native peoples living there under the regime of British East Africa (specifically, the "Nilotic Kavirondo" and the "Bantu Kavirondo"). Broadly, this was defined as those who dwelt in the valley of the Nzoia River on the western slopes of Mount Elgon and along the northeast coast of Victoria Nyanza.

Suggested etymologies of the name "Kavirondo" include

- From local young warriors, armed with spears, bows, arrows, & clubs, who were observed to sit on their heels, which in Swahili is kaa virondo. Thus, the region became Kavirondo, the inhabitants pejoratively called wa-Kavirondo: "people who sit on their heels"
- From kaba-londo: In Buganda two unusual words related to royalty were combined, kabaka, the king & namu-londo, the stool used as throne on which the king is crowned.

(Both putative origins are doubtful).

A more plausible etymological origin of the name Kavirondo is from the Kalenjin language "Kap-Kirondo" meaning "the place of Reeds" denoting the reeds by Lake Victoria. Historian Alfred T. Matson explains in fair detail the obscure origins of the name and its first usage at the dawn of British rule in East Africa.

== Origins and divisions ==
Kavirondo was the general name of two distinct groups of ethnic groups, the Bantu speakers and the Nilotic speakers. The Bantu appear to have been the first comers. The Nilotic ethnic groups, probably an offshoot of the Acholi, appear to have crossed Lake Victoria to reach their present home, the country around Kavirondo Gulf. Of the two, the Bantu occupied a more northerly position than their neighbors, and were practically the most northerly representatives of that race (Hobley). The Nilotic Kavirondo in their turn had their wanderings arrested by an irruption of Elgumi people (themselves probably of Nilotic origin) from the east.

The Bantu Kavirondo were divided into three principal types: the Awa-Rimi, the Awa-Ware, and the Awa-Kisii. Their Nilotic neighbors call the Bantu Kavirondo Jo-Mwa (singular: Ja-Mwa). The generic name for the Nilotic tribes is Jo-Luo (singular: Ja-Luo), but the Bantu Kavirondo call them Awa-Nyoro. The two groups have many characteristics in common.

The Kavirondo had many tribes, divided, Sir H. H. Johnston suspected, totemically.

== Culture and society ==
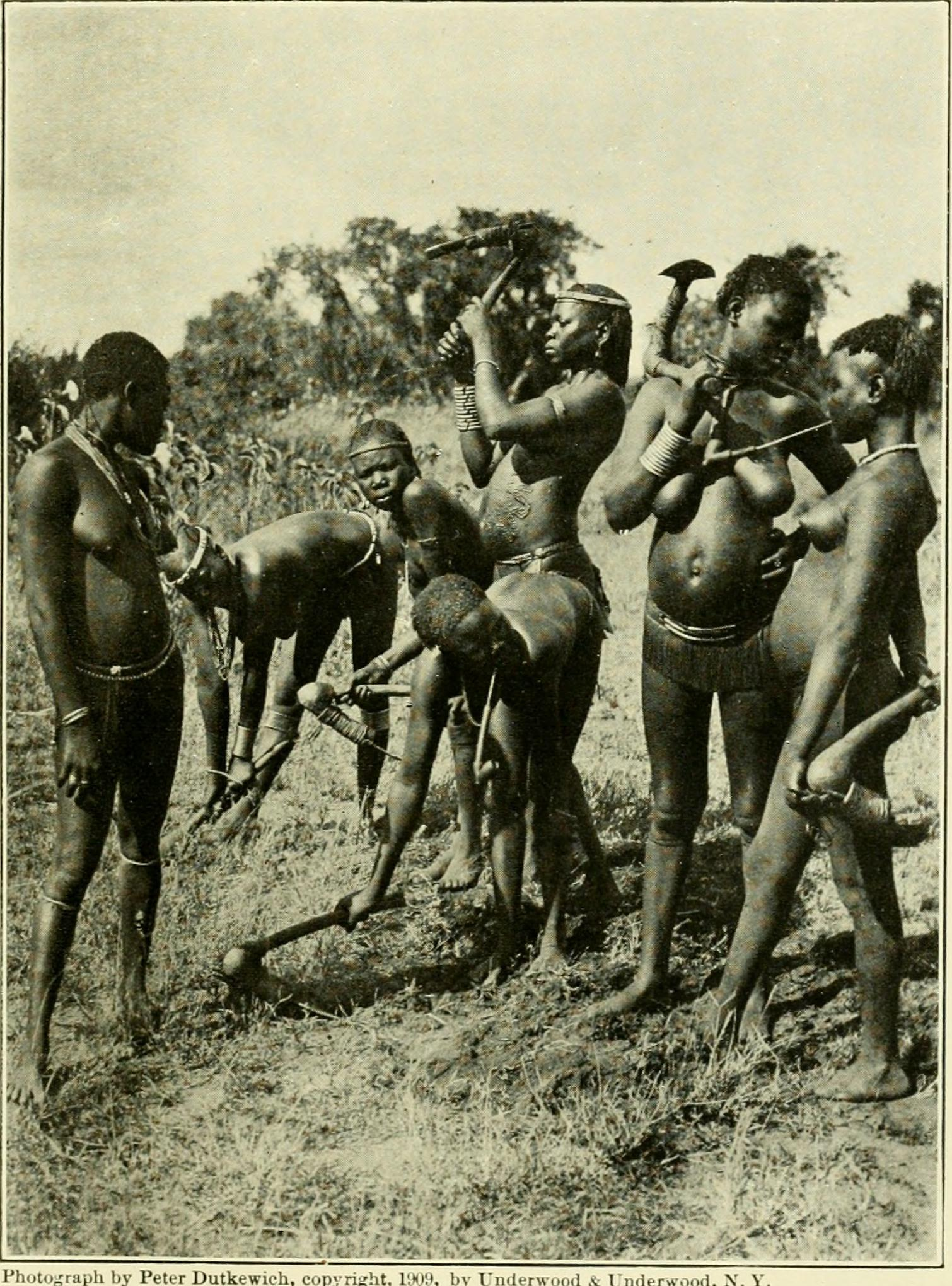
Bantu Kavirondo women working a field, early 20th century.

A characteristic feature of the people was their traditional nakedness. Among the Nilotic Kavirondo married men who are fathers wore a small piece of goat-skin (Sembe) which, though practically useless as a covering, was worn according to ethnic etiquette. Even among men who have adopted European clothing, this goat-skin must still be worn underneath. Contact with whites has led to the adoption of European clothing by numbers of the men (who were better travelled), but the women (who were less travelled), more conservative, remained in nudity or the scanty covering which they wore before the advent of Europeans.

Among the Bantu Kavirondo, married women wear a short fringe of black string in front and a tassel of banana fiber suspended from a girdle behind, this tassel having at a distance the appearance of a tail. Hence the report of early travellers as to a tailed race in Africa. The Nilotic Kavirondo women wear the tail, but dispense with the fringe in front. For dandy, they wear a goat-skin slung over the shoulders.

Some of the Bantu tribes practice circumcision. The Nilotic tribes do not. Patterns are tattooed on the chest and stomach as an ornament. Men, even husbands, are forbidden to touch the women's tails, which must be worn even if any other clothing is wrapped round the body.

The Kavirondo are noted for their independent and pugnacious nature, honesty and sexual morality, traits particularly marked among the Bantu tribes. There are more women than men, and thus the Kavirondo are naturally inclined towards polygamy. Among the Bantu tribes a man has the refusal of all the younger sisters of his wife as they attain puberty. Practically no woman lives unmarried all her life, for if no suitor seeks her, she singles out a man and offers herself to him at a reduced price, an offer usually accepted, as the women are excellent agricultural laborers. The Nilotic Kavirondo incline to exogamy, endeavouring always to marry outside their clan. Girls are betrothed at six or seven, and the husband-elect continually makes small presents to his father-in-law-elect until the bride reaches womanhood.

It is regarded as shameful if the girl be not found a virgin on her wedding day. She is sent back to her parents, who have to return the marriage price and pay a fine. The wife's adultery was formerly punished with death, and the capital penalty was also inflicted on young men and girls guilty of unchastity. Among the Bantu Kavirondo, the usual minimum price for a wife is forty hoes, twenty goats, and one cow, paid in installments. The Nilotic Kavirondo pay twenty sheep and two to six cows; the husband-elect can claim his bride after half payment; if a woman dies without bearing children, the amount of her purchase is returnable by her father, unless the widower consents to replace her by another sister. The women are prolific, and the birth of twins is common and considered a lucky event which is celebrated by feasting and dances.

Among the Bantu Kavirondo, the mother of twins must remain in her hut for seven days; among the Nilotic Kavirondo, the parents and the infants must stay in the hut for a whole month. If a Bantu mother has lost two children in succession, the next child born is taken out at dawn and placed on the road, where it is left until a neighbor, usually a woman friend who has gone that way on purpose, picks it up and takes it to its mother who gives a goat in return; a somewhat similar custom prevails among the Nilotic tribes. Names are neither masculine nor feminine, and a girl often bears her father's name.

The Kavirondo bury their dead. Among one of the Bantu tribes, the Awa-Kisesa, a chief is buried in the floor of his own hut in a sitting position, but at such a depth that the head protrudes. Over the head, an earthenware pot is placed, and his principal wives have to remain in the hut until the flesh is eaten by ants or decomposes, when the skull is removed and buried close to the hut. Later the skeleton is unearthed, and reburied with much ceremony in the sacred burial place of the tribe.

Married women of the Bantu tribes are buried in their hut lying on their right side with legs doubled up, the hut being then deserted. Among the Nilotic tribes the grave is dug beneath the verandah of the hut. Men of the Bantu tribes are buried in an open space in the midst of their huts; in the Nilotic tribes, if the first wife of the deceased be alive he is buried in her hut, if not, beneath the verandah of the hut in which he died. A child is buried near the door of its mothers hut. A sign of mourning is a cord of banana fibre worn round the neck and waist.

A chief chooses, sometimes years before his death, one of his sons to succeed him, often giving a brass bracelet as an insignia. A man's property is divided equally among his children.

While some tribes live in isolated huts, those in the north have strongly walled villages. The walls are of mud and, formerly, among the Nilotic tribes, occasionally of stone. Since colonization by the British, the security of the country induced the Kavirondo to let the walls fall into disrepair. Their huts are circular with conical thatched roofs, and fairly broad verandas all round.

A portion of the hut is partitioned off as a sleeping-place for goats, and the fowls sleep indoors in a large basket. Skins form the only bedsteads. In each hut are two fireplaces, about which a rigid etiquette prevails. Strangers or distant relatives are not allowed to pass beyond the first, which is near the door, and is used for cooking. At the second, which is nearly in the middle of the hut, sits the hut owner, his wives, children, brothers, and sisters. Around this fireplace, the family sleep.

Cooking pots, water pots and earthenware grain jars are the only other furniture. The food is served in small baskets. Every full-grown man has a hut to himself, and one for each wife. The huts of the Masaba Kavirondo of west Elgon have the apex of the roof surmounted by a carved pole which Sir H. H. Johnston says is obviously a phallus. Among the Bantu Kavirondo a father does not eat with his sons, nor do brothers eat together. Among the Nilotic tribes father and sons eat together, usually in a separate hut with open sides. Women eat apart and only after the men have finished.

Though a peaceful people, the Kavirondo fight well. Their weapons are spears with rather long flat blades without blood-courses and broad-bladed swords. Some use slings, and most carry shields. Bows and arrows are also used; firearms are however displacing other weapons. Kavirondo warfare was mainly defensive and intertribal, this last a form of vendetta. When a man had killed his enemy in battle he shaved his head on his return and was rubbed with medicine (generally goats dung), to defend him from the spirit of the dead man. The Awa-Wanga abandoned this custom when they obtained firearms. The young warriors were made to stab the bodies of their slain enemies.

In the colonial era the Kavirondo are on the increase due to their fecundity and morality. Those who live in the low-lying lands suffer from a mild malaria, while abroad they are subject to dysentery and pneumonia. Epidemics of small-pox have occurred. Native medicine is of the simplest. They dress wounds with butter and leaves, and for inflammation of the lungs or pleurisy, pierce a hole in the chest. There are no medicine-men: the women are the doctors. Certain of the incisor teeth are pulled out. If a man retains these he will, it is thought, be killed in warfare. Among certain tribes the women also have incisor teeth extracted, otherwise misfortune would befall their husbands. For the same reason the wife scars the skin of her forehead or stomach. A Kavirondo husband, before starting on a perilous journey, cuts scars on his wife's body to ensure him good luck.

Of dances, the Kavirondo have the birth dance, the death dance, that at initiation and one of a propitiatory kind in seasons of drought. Their music is plaintive and sometimes pretty, produced by a large lyre-shaped instrument. They also use various drums.

The Luo women use small beads attached to pieces of brass for ear ornaments. Like the aggrey beads of West Africa these beads are not of local manufacture nor of recent introduction. They are ancient, generally blue in color, occasionally yellow or green, and are picked up in certain districts after heavy rain. The natives believe they come down with the rain. They are identical in shape and color to Ancient Egyptian beads and other beads obtained from trade with peoples from ancient cities in Balochistan, in modern Pakistan.

== Religion and beliefs ==
They practice a vague ancestor worship, but the northern tribes have two gods, Awafwa and Ishishemi, the spirits of good and evil. They scarifice cattle and goats to the former. The Kavirondo believe in divination from a sheep's entrails. Nearly everyone and everything is ominous of good or evil to the Kavirondo. They have few myths or traditions; the antbear is the chief figure in their legends. They believe in witchcraft and practise trial by ordeal.

== Economy ==
The Kavirondo are essentially an agricultural people: both men and women work in the fields with large iron hoes. In addition to sorghum, Eleusine and maize, tobacco and hemp are both cultivated and smoked. Both sexes smoke, but the use of hemp is restricted to men and unmarried women, as it is thought to injure child-bearing women. Hemp is smoked in a hubble-bubble. The Kavirondo cultivate sesamum and make an oil from its seeds which they burn in little clay lamps of the ancient saucer type, the pattern being, in Hobley's opinion, introduced into the country by the coast people.

The Kavirondo keep cattle, sheep, goats, fowls and a few dogs. Women do not eat sheep, fowls or eggs, and are not allowed to drink milk except when mixed with other things. The flesh of the wild cat and leopard is esteemed by most of the tribes. Among the Bantu Kavirondo goats and sheep are suffocated, the snout being held until the animal dies. From Eleusine a beer is made.

The Kavirondo are plucky hunters, capturing the hippopotamus with ropes and traps, and attacking with spears the largest elephants. Fish, of which they are very fond, are caught by line and rod or in traps. Bee-keeping is common, and where trees are scarce the hives are placed on the roof of the hut.

Traditional Kavirondo industries are salt-making, effected by burning reeds and water-plants and passing water through the ashes; the smelting of iron ore (confined to the Bantu tribes); pottery and basket-work.

== Sources and references ==
- C. W. Hobley, Eastern Uganda, an Ethnological Survey (Anthrop. Inst., Occasional Papers, No. I, London, 1902)
- Sir H. H. Johnston, Uganda Protectorate (1902)
- J. F. Cunningham, Uganda and its Peoples (1905)
- Paul Kollmann, The Victoria Nyanza (1899).
