= Wycliffe Wangamati =

Governor of Bungoma from 2017-2022

- Education: Moi University
- Occupation: Politician
- Office: Governor Of Bungoma County
- Term: 2017-2022
- Predecessor: Kenneth Lusaka
- Political party: Ford Kenya
- Spouse: Carol Wangamati
- Children: 3

Wycliffe Wafula Wangamati is a Kenyan national and politician who served as the second governor of Bungoma on a Ford Kenya ticket. Wangamati came to power after defeating Kenneth Lusaka in the 2017 election. In the election on August 9, 2022, he was again defeated by Kenneth Lusaka who was then the Speaker of the Senate. Wangamati only ruled Bungoma County for One term.

== Biography ==
Wangamati was born and raised in Kanduyi. His father, Patrick Wangamati, was a Ford Kenya nominated MP and served as Mayor of Webuye in the 1980s. He attended Kanduyi DEB, St Mary's Kibabii and Musingu High Schools. He later pursued his bachelor's degree at Moi University.

Prior to joining politics, Wangamati was the executive director for Alexander Forbes East Africa. He was also a member of the Institute and Faculty of Actuaries.

== 2017 Election ==
Wangamati ran his gubernatorial campaign against incumbent Kenneth Lusaka of Jubilee in the 2017 Kenyan General Election. Their rivalry was heated and incredibly fractious. Wangamati and Lusaka were each fined Ksh. 1,000,000 ($10,000) by the IEBC for acts of violence committed by their supporters on the campaign trail.

Wangamati won the election narrowly with 48.74% of the vote to Lusaka's 43.41%.

== Personal life ==
Wangamati is married to Carol Wangamati. They have three children.
