= Tachoni =

Ethnic group of western Kenya

Regions with significant populations
- Kenya

Languages
- Luhya (Olutachoni dialect)

Related ethnic groups
- Luhya people, Kalenjin people
- The Tachoni people are often mistaken for Bukusu due to cultural similarities and proximity. Historically known as Kitoki, Kitosh, Evekwe, Sirikwa, and Tashone, the Tachoni trace their origins to Egypt, migrating along the Nile to present-day Kenya.

The Tachoni (meaning "we shall be back" in Kalenjin

They are related to other luhyas. They occupy parts of Bungoma County, Kakamega County, Trans Nzoia County, and Uasin Gishu County in the western part of Kenya. Tachoni people were masters at building forts such as Chetambe, Lumboka, and Kiliboti. It was their defiance of colonialism that led to the colonial government to put the entire region occupied by the Tachoni under administration of paramount chiefs drawn from Bunyala and Wanga communities.

The Tachoni share land with the Abanyala, the Kabras, Nandi, and Bukusu tribe. They live mainly in Webuye, Chetambe Hills, Ndivisi (of Bungoma County) Matete sub-county-Lwandeti, Maturu, Mayoyo, Lukhokho, Kiliboti, Kivaywa, Chepsai, and Lugari sub-county in Kakamega County. Most Tachoni clans living in Bungoma speak the ' Olutachoni dialect, a hybrid of the luhyia language of the luhyia people. They lost their original dialect during the divide and rule system used by white colonialists to disperse resistance, and were thus required to find a way to interact with their new neighbors, which is why they are often mistaken for Bukusus. They spread from Kakamega county to Trans-Nzoia County, webuye especially around Kitale, Tambach in Iten Nandi in areas like kabiyet and kapsisiwa, kericho and to Uasin Gishu County near Turbo, Eldoret.

== Clans and origins ==
Among the Tachoni clans are Abachikha -further divided into Abakobolo, Abamuongo, Abachambai, Abamakhanga, Abacharia, and Abakabini, Abamarakalu, Abangachi -who are further divided into: Abawaila, Abakhumaya and Abawele, Abasang'alo, Abasamo, Abayumbu (mostly around Webuye), Abaluu, Abarefu, Abanyangali, Abamuchembi, Abamakhuli, Abasioya, Abaabichu, Abacheo, Abamachina, Abaengele, Abamutama, Abakafusi, Abasonge, Abasaniaka, Abaabiya also known as Abakatumi (Abamuumbwa, Abachikolati and Abamuruli), Abakubwayi, Abakamutebi, Abakamukong, Abamweya, Abalukulu, Abawande, Abatukiika, Abachimuluku. Note that the morpheme 'aba' means 'people'. The Abakhusia/abasamo of Kabras are also Tachonis who speak Kikabras. Abayumbu and Abaluu are twin brothers, hence do not inter marry.

The community members trace their origin to a place called El-Matruh, Egypt (Misri), From Egypt, the followed the Nile river down into their present-day region Kenya. Important areas on the Tachoni migration route include Sirikwa, which is referred to most by scholars to link the Tachoni and the Kalenjins ethnic groups.

Histiorically, the Tachoni people were known by different names. Some of the names include the Kitoki, Kitosh, Evekwe-those from the East, Sirikwa, and Tashone.

== Circumcision ==
The tribe is rich in beliefs and taboos. The most elaborate cultural practice they have is circumcision.

The Tachoni practice circumcision in August of every even year. When the boys are circumcised, they go hunting in the village's forest for birds and guineafowl (likhanga), and a meal is prepared for them when they return in the evening. Most meals for initiates are rich in protein and Ugali (a staple-food across Kenya, which is called 'Ovusuma' in Tachoni) in order to replace blood lost during the circumcision.

The Tachoni tribe believe in 'okhulicha' (rites of passage [the training of initiates in adult roles before they are considered to be adults]). The boys are taken to 'Esitabicha' where they are taught adult behavior. They are told secrets of the community which they are not to reveal to anyone. This is done by elderly members of the Tachoni community who have undergone the same ritual. They are taught Tachoni beliefs, philosophy, values and practices.

After the rite of passage, Okhulicha, the initiates are assigned an age set, which follow a particular order, based on the year of circumcision. The Tachoni age sets are as follows(taking into account the year of circumcision and the name of the age set): Vakolongolov1900-1910; Vakikwameti 1912–1922; Vakananachi 1924–1934; Vakinyikeu 1936–1946; Vanyange 1948–1958; Vamaina 1960–1970; Vachuma 1972–1986; Vasawa1988-1998; Vakolongolo 2000–2010; and Vakikwameti 2012–2022.

For instance, during circumcision, Tachoni boys face towards the East as they are circumcised as a sign of respect to their god El who is believed to be dwelling at the East.

== Economy ==
The Tachoni practice farming as well as the rearing of cattle. A few engage in business.

== Politics ==
Notable politicians among the Tachoni include John Chikati, Nabii Nabwera- current MP for Lugari Constituency, Martin Wanyonyi Pepel- current MP for Webuye East Constituency, Alfred Wekesa Sambu of Webuye, Dr. Noah Wekesa of Kwanza in Trans Nzoia, long-serving Councillor & Webuye Mayor and Current Minority Leader Kakamega County Assembly - John Mweyi Ngome, Amos Kaburu[Educationist], Nabii Nabwera (Council of Governors), John Sifuma Matinyi (Agriculturalist, Educationist and Paramount Chief from Lukusi) and John Weyusia Nanyakha (the first Mihuu Ward Member of County Assembly). Those who have died include: Johnstone Welangai - former Malava large constituency and former high commissioner of Kenya to Uganda; Joshua Mulanda Angatia, former minister for health and member of parliament for Malava constituency; Munialo Matinyi, the first Chief of Mawe Tatu and a close confidant of Alfred Wekesa Sambu; former minister of state and secretary general of KANU Burudi Nabwera, Dr Noah Wekesa - former minister for tourism and wildlife and chairman of Jubilee Party; and Professor Everret Standa - a former vice chancellor of Kenyatta University and chairman of the commission of higher education.

Peter Buruti Sifuma Namisi, Jonathan Welangai Masinde- former member of parliament for Lurambi North, & Burudi Nabwera are the legends of Tachoni politics. Don't forget Wasike Binyenya (omumwalie)as well.

Wasilwa se-Wekesa, chairman of Tachoni Cultural Society (TACUSO) is also a notable figure in Tachoni community.

== Dialects ==
Tachoni tribe stands as an independent tribe in Kenya. Mostly people mistaken it to a luhyia group since most of its occupants live in areas around Webuye in Bungoma county thus sharing a land with the luhyia groups especially the Bukusu and Kabras. Tachonis' are believed to have originated from El-Matru a region in Misri Egypt and migrated downwards following the Nile river due to a deadly attack that happened by their neighbors which lead to a great bloodshed.

On their way they met the kalenjin subtribes which they interacted and moved together via Ethiopia into Kenya. Upon reaching Kenya, they divided into groups which lead them to occupy lower western region as the Sabaots, Teuregs and some groups went at the slopes of mount Elgon while the other kalenjin subtribes went further to the regions of Uasin gishu which was by then occupied by the Maasai people.

Later on, other tribes begun occupying the unoccupied regions in western region e.g. the Tesos. During the onset of colonialism, they had gathered and multiplied further. So when the whites begun their rules, the Tachonis' resisted together with the Nandi tribe and some other tribes which lead to an intense fight. The fight lead to capture of some leaders e.g. Koitalel arap Samoei of the Nandi, while the Tachonis' were subjected to a total brutal workforce. Their greeneries were burnt down, while some were killed. Leaders we're drawn as far as kisumu and other tribes like Kabras and wanga to rule over them. That was not enough. Their lands were taken by force and we're forced to flee and find refuge from other tribes. This means of divide and rule lead to the lose of their dialect and their lands to date. Most of the settlement schemes and forest reserves in the wide western region of Kenya were once the Tachoni lands. After independence, the government took all those white settlements and made them government properties thus leading to a total disettlment of the Tachoni people. That's why they lack their official lands as many other tribes in Kenya
