= Kenneth Lusaka =

Kenyan politician

Kenneth Makelo Lusaka

2nd Speaker of the Kenyan Senate
- In office 31 August 2017 – 8 September 2022
- Preceded by: Ekwee Ethuro
- Succeeded by: Amason Kingi

Governor of Bungoma County
- In office 4 March 2013 – 8 August 2017
- Succeeded by: Wycliffe Wangamati
- In office 25th August 2022 – Present

Personal details
- Born: 18 September 1963 (age 62) Bungoma County

Kenneth Makelo Lusaka (born 18 September 1963) is the current governor of Bungoma County. Previously, he served as the speaker of Senate [2017 -2022] and was the 1st Governor of Bungoma County in Kenya, a term he served between 4 March 2013 to 8 August 2017 where he was defeated by Wycliffe Wafula Wangamati in the 2017 General Elections. As the 2022 General Election approached, Lusaka left Jubilee and returned to Ford Kenya, a party under the umbrella of the Kenya Kwanza Alliance.

Running on a Ford Kenya ticket, Lusaka contested for the Bungoma gubernatorial seat once again in August 2022 and successfully reclaimed the position by defeating incumbent Wycliffe Wangamati.

== Early life ==
Ken Lusaka Was born on (18 September 1963) in Bungoma County. He attended Kamukuywa Primary School, then Kibabii High School for his 'O' Levels and later Chesamisi High School and Friends School Kamusinga for his 'A' levels. After high school, he went on to complete a Bachelor of Arts degree in Government and History. From the Institute of Social Studies in the Netherlands, he earned an MA in Public Policy and Administration, and was the President of Scholars for the student body.

== Politics ==
In 2013, Ken Lusaka ran successfully for the position of Bungoma governor, alongside Alfred Khangati, Maurice Makhanu, Jack Tumwa and Wabwoba Walinywa. In the course of his tenure as a governor he moved to Jubilee Party on which he attempted to secure a second term on 8 August 2017. He, however, failed but was fronted by the Jubilee Party as a candidate for speaker of the Senate. On 31 August 2017, Lusaka won the speaker seat on second round with 42 votes against his closest rival Farah Maalim who garnered 25 votes thus becoming the second speaker of the senate in the history of Kenya.

== Controversy ==
In September 2015, the county government of Bungoma was audited and it was discovered that the county had spent Kshs 1,093,200 (approximately $10,881) on 10 wheelbarrows for the Bungoma slaughterhouse, suggesting that the wheelbarrows cost Kshs 109,320 ($1,088) each. In response to the outrage sparked by Kenyans over what appeared to be massive waste of taxpayer money by the government, Governor Lusaka said that, "The information that I am getting from the veterinary department is that these are not the ordinary wheelbarrows that we know. These are wheelbarrows that are made of stainless, non-carcinogenic material and are used in the food industry." However, he later said that he had begun investigations and ordered the tender and evaluation committees to justify the purchases.
