= Charles William Hobley =

British administrator in Kenya

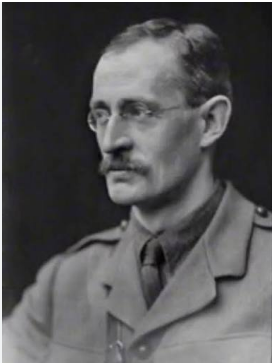

Charles William Hobley, CMG (b. Chilvers Coton, Warwickshire, England in 1867; d. Oxted, Surrey on 31 March 1947) — known as C. W. Hobley — was a pioneering British Colonial administrator in Kenya. He served the Colonial Service in Kenya from 1894 until his retirement in 1921 and published a number of monographs on a variety of subjects.

== Biography ==
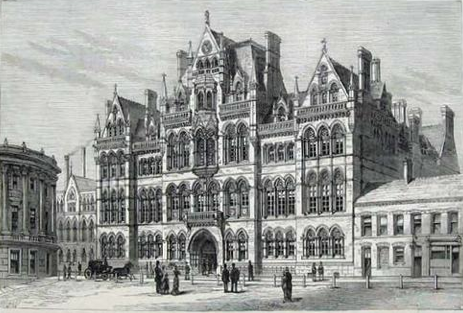
Mason College, now the University of Birmingham

The son of an Indian Civil Servant, Hobley underwent technical education in engineering at Mason College (now the University of Birmingham).

He joined the Imperial British East Africa Company and was sent to Mombasa in 1890, where he served as Transport Superintendent at the coast. He left the company after three years but within a year had become a First Class Assistant under the Foreign Office and served the British government in Kenya from that point on. He undertook a general tour of the whole of the Central African Lake Region (1895–96) and first arrived at Mumias in February 1895, where he established a British administration station along Sclater's Road. In 1896, he became the first European to circumambulate Mount Elgon and the same year he arrived in the Kano Plains/Kisumu area. He oversaw a number of punitive expeditions (1894–1908) which were carried out to pacify hostile natives. In 1905, he married Alice Mary Turner. Ultimately, Hobley became Provincial Commissioner of Kavirondo Region (later called Nyanza Province) and later (circa 1909) sub-commissioner of Ukamba Province (stationed in Nairobi). During the First World War, he served as Chief Political Officer to the British forces in what was later named Tanganyika Territory.

He was awarded the Back Award of the Royal Geographical Society in 1915 and retired from the Foreign Service in 1921.

== Publications ==
Something of a polymath, C.W. Hobley published on a wide variety of subjects.

- Hobley, C.W., "Eastern Uganda, an Ethnological Survey" Anthrop. Inst., Occasional Papers, No. I, London, 1902.
- Hobley, C.W., 1903, "Notes Concerning the Eldorobo of Mau, East Africa", Man, 3.17:33-35.
- Hobley, Charles William, Ethnology of Akamba and other East African Tribes, Cambridge: The University Press, 1910; Reprinted 1971, London: Frank Cass & Co. Ltd. (Series: Cass Library of African Studies: General Studies No. 96).
- Hobley, C.W., 1918, "The Lubwa and Elgon Caves, with some remarks on their origin and the geology of the region", Journal of East Africa and Uganda Natural History Society, v. 13, p. 280.
- Hobley, Charles William, Bantu Beliefs and Magic with Particular Reference to the Kikuyu and Kamba Tribes of Kenya Colony, Together with Some Reflections on East Africa After the War (1922, Reprinted 1938, New York: Barnes & Noble; Reprinted 1967, London: Cass; Reprinted 1992, London: H. F. & G. Witherby).
- Hobley, C.W., Kenya: From Chartered Company to Crown Colony, Thirty Years of Exploration and Administration in British East Africa (1929; Reprinted 1970, London: Frank Cass, with new introduction).
- Hobley, C.W., "Soil Erosion: A Problem in Human Geography", A Paper Read at the Afternoon Meeting of the [?Royal Geographical] Society on 8 May 1933, Geographical Review 82 (1933): 139–46.
- Hobley, C.W., "The Preservation of Wild Life in the Empire", Afr Aff (Lond), 1935, XXXIV: 403–407.
- Hobley, C.W., "Inland Waters of Africa", Afr Aff (Lond), 1935, XXXIV: 469–470.
