= Bungoma District =

Former district in Kenya

Bungoma District was a district in the former Western Province of Kenya. Its capital town was Bungoma. It had an area of 2,069 km^{2}.

In 1956, Elgon Nyanza District was split from North Nyanza District. The new district was headquartered at Bungoma. In 1963, the district was split into two districts: Bungoma and Busia, all within Western Province.

By 2005, Bungoma District was completely nonexistent after it had been divided into smaller districts, namely; Mt. Elgon, Bungoma East, Bungoma North, Bungoma South, and Bungoma West. All with a total population of 1,375,063.

In 2010, after the promulgation of the new constitution of Kenya, counties were to be created based on the districts of Kenya as at 1992. This effectively led to the creation of Bungoma County.

== Administration ==
Local authorities (councils)
Authority	Type	Population*	Urban pop.*
Bungoma	Municipality	60,650	44,196
Kimilili	Municipality	71,299	10,261
Webuye	Municipality	48,806	19,606
Malakisi	Town	38,004	3,762
Sirisia	Town	22,703	822
Bungoma County	County	635,029	10,852
Total	-	876,491	89,499
* 1999 census. Source:

Administrative divisions
Division	Population*	Urban pop.*	Headquarters
Bumula	129,011	0	
Central	60,605	0	
Chwele	41,174	2,677	Chwele
Kanduyi	163,568	38,407	Bungoma
Kimilili	96,674	9,631	Kimilili
Malakisi	36,042	3,341	Malakisi
Ndivisi	57,336	1,905	
Sirisia	44,088	769	Sirisia
Tongaren	133,296	5,313	
Webuye	114,697	18,257	Webuye
Total	876,491	79,490	

The district had five constituencies:

- Kimilili Constituency
- Webuye Constituency
- Sirisia Constituency
- Kanduyi Constituency
- Bumula Constituency
