= Divisions of Kenya =

The districts of Kenya were divided into 262 divisions (matarafa). Divisions of Kenya were further subdivided into locations. Today's counties of Kenya are based on the merging of some of the districts on this list and since the divisions are one level under the districts they are now the sub-counties. This is because Kenya recently changed its constitution and 47 Counties emerged. Here are the divisions listed below, by district (before the change in administration):

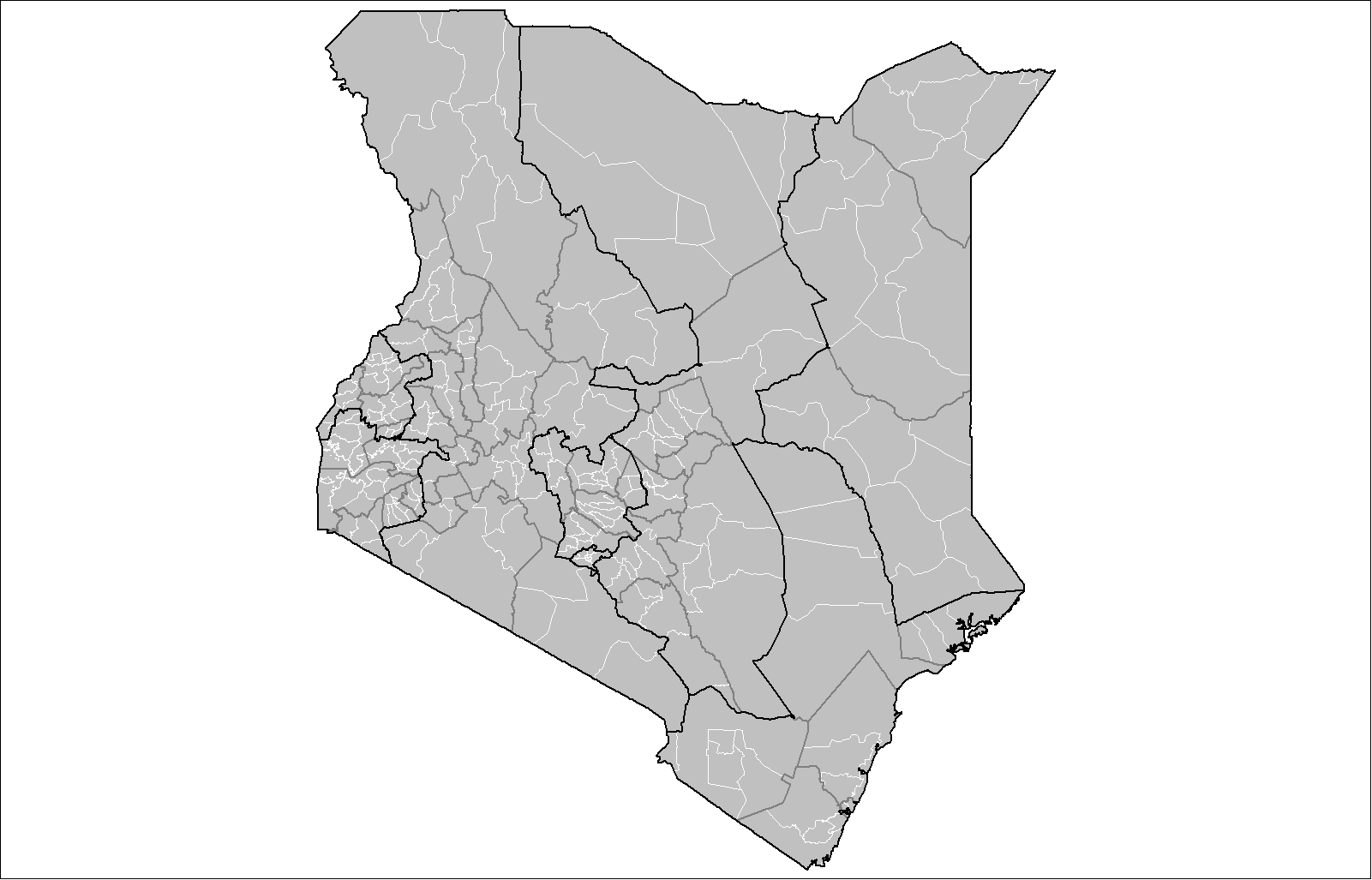
Divisions of Kenya

== Baringo District ==
- Kabarnet
- Kabartonjo
- Marigat
- Mochongoi
- Mogotio
- Nginyang
- Koibatek
- Tenges

== Bomet District ==
- Bomet
- Chepalungu
- Konoin

== Bondo ==
Maranda

Nyang'oma

Rarieda

Madiany

Usigu

== Bungoma District ==
- Cheptaisi
- Kanduyi
- Kapsokwony
- Kimilili
- Mt.elgon Forest
- Sirisia
- Tongareni
- Webuye
- Bumula

== Busia ==
- Teso North
- Teso South
- Amukura
- Budalangi
- Butula
- Funyula
- Nambale
- Matayos

== Embu District ==
- Central
- Nembure
- Manyatta
- Runyenjes
- Kyeni
- Gachoka
- Mwea
- Makima
- Kiritiri
- Evurore
- Siakago

== Garissa District ==
- Bura
- Central Garissa
- Dadaab
- Hulugho
- Galmagalla
- Jarajilla
- Masalani
- Mbalambala
- Modogashe
- sankuri
- danyere
- Shant-abak
- Benane
- Liboi

Etago Kenyenya Nyacheki Nyamache Nyamarambe Ogembo Sameta

== Homa Bay District ==
- Kendu Bay
- Mbita
- Ndhiwa
- Oyugis
- Rangwe

== Ijara District ==
- Hulugho
- Ijara
- Masalani
- Sangailu

== Isiolo District ==
- Central Isiolo
- Garba Tulla
- Merti
- Sericho

== Kajiado District ==
- Central Kajiado
- Loitokitok
- Magadi
- Ngong
- Mashuru

== Kakamega District ==
- Butere
- Ikolomani
- Khwisero
- Lugari
- Lurambi
- Malava/kabras
- Mumias
- Shinyalu

== Keiyo District ==
- Chepkorio
- Soy
- Metkei

== Kericho District ==
- Belgut
- Bureti
- Kipkelion
- Ainamoi
- Soin
- Sigowet

== Kiambu District ==
- Gatundu (Gatundu North and Gatundu South)
- Githunguri
- Kiambaa
- Kikuyu
- Lari
- Limuru
- Thika- Juja

== Kilifi District ==
The original Kilifi District (County) has since been split to five districts:

- Kilifi
- Ganze
- Malindi
- Magarini
- Kaloleni
- Rabai

Kilifi District now has the following divisions:

- Bahari
- Kikambala
- Chonyi

Ganze district has these divisions:

- Ganze
- Bamba
- Vitengeni

While Kaloleni Division was recently split into two districts:

- Kaloleni
- Rabai

Malindi division also was upgraded to district and later split into two districts:

- Malindi
- Magarini

== Kirinyaga District ==
- Gichugu
- kirinyaga central
- Mwea
- Ndia

== Kisii Central ==
- Bosongo
- Irianyi
- Kisii Municipality
- Marani
- Masaba
- Nyamache
- Ogembo
- Suneka

== Kisumu District ==
- Kisumu Township
- Kisumu Central
- Kisumu East
- Kisumu North
- Kisumu Southwest
- Kajulu East
- Kajulu West
- Central Kolwa
- East Kolwa
- West Kolwa

== Kitui District ==
- Central Kitui
- Kwa-vonza
- Kyuso
- Mutito
- Mutomo
- Mwingi

== Kwale District ==
- Kinango
- Matuga
- LungaLunga
- Msambweni
- Samburu

== Laikipia District ==
- Central Laikipia
- Mukogondo
- Ng'arua
- Rumuruti

== Lamu District ==
- Amu
- Faza
- Kiunga
- Mpeketoni
- Witu

== Machakos District ==
- Central Machakos
- Kangundo
- Kathiani
- Masinga
- Mwala
- Yatta

== Makueni District ==
- Kibwezi
- Kilome
- Makueni
- Mbooni
- Tsavo West National Park

== Malindi District ==
- Malindi
- Magarini

== Mandera District ==
- Banissa
- Central Mandera
- Elwak
- Fino
- Rhamu
- Takaba

== Marakwet District ==
- Tot
- Tunyo
- Tirap
- Chepyemit
- Kapcherop

== Marsabit District ==
- Central Marsabit
- Laisamis
- Loiyangalani
- Moyale
- North Horr
- Sololo

== Meru Central District ==
- Central Imenti
- Igembe
- Meru National Park
- Mount Kenya Forest
- North Imenti
- Ntonyiri
- South Imenti
- Tigania
- Timau

== Migori District ==
- Kehancha
- Migori
- Nyatike
- Rongo

== Mombasa District ==
- Changamwe
- Kisauni
- Likoni
- Mvita

== Mount Elgon District ==
- Kaptama
- Kapsokwony
- Kopsiro
- Cheptais

== Murang'a District ==
- Gatanga
- Kandara
- Kangema
- Kigumo
- Kiharu
- Makuyu

== Mutomo District ==
Ikutha

Mutomo

Mutha

== Nairobi District ==
- Central Nairobi
- Dagoretti
- Embakasi
- Kasarani
- Lang'ata
- Makadara
- Westlands
- Pumwani

== Nakuru District ==
- Bahati
- Gilgil
- Mbogoini
- Molo
- Naivasha
- Municipality_nakuru
- Njoro
- Olenguruone
- Rongai
- Keringet

== Nandi ==
- Aldai
- Kapsabet
- Kilibwoni
- Mosop
- Tindiret

== Narok District ==
- MARA
- Mau
- Olokurto
- Osupuko
- Ololulunga
- MULOT
- Loita

== Nyamira District ==
- Borabu
- Ekerenyo
- Magombo
- Nyamira

== Nyandarua District ==
- Kinangop
- Kipipiri
- Ndaragwa
- Ol Joro Orok
- Ol-kalou

== Nyando District ==
- Muhoroni
- Upper Nyakach
- Lower Nyakach
- Nyando
- Miwani

== Nyeri District ==
- Aberdare Forest/National Park
- Kieni East
- Kieni West
- Mathira
- Mount Kenya Forest/National Park
- Mukurweini
- Nyeri Municipality
- Othaya
- Tetu

== Rachuonyo District ==
- West Karachuonyo
- East Karachuonyo
- Kasipul
- Kabondo

== Samburu District ==
- Baragoi
- Lorroki
- Wamba
- Waso

== Siaya District ==
- Boro
- Karemo
- Ogongó
- Rarieda
- Ugunja
- Ukwala
- Yala

== Suba District ==
Suba South

Suba North

== Taita-Taveta District ==
- Mwatate
- Taveta
- Tsavo East National Park
- Tsavo West National Park
- Voi
- Wundanyi

== Tana River District ==
- Bangale
- Bura
- Galole
- Garsen
- Kipini
- Madogo
- Wenje

== Teso District ==
- Chakol
- Amagoro
- Amukura
- Ang’urai

== Tharaka District ==
- Chiakariga
- Gatunga
- Marimanti
- Nkondi
- Turima

== Thika District ==
- Gatanga
- Gatundu
- Kamwangi (Gatundu North)
- Kakuzi
- Municipality
- Ruiru

== Trans Nzoia District ==
- Cherangani
- Kwanza
- Saboti
- Kitale
- Kiminini

== Turkana District ==
- Central (Kalokol)
- Kakuma
- Katilu
- Kibish
- Lake Turkana
- Lokitaung
- Lokori
- Turkwel
- Lokichoggio, including the areas spanning as far as Nalet.

== Uasin Gishu District ==
- Ainabkoi
- Kesses
- Moiben
- Soy
- Eldoret
- Matunda
- Moi's Bridge

== Vihiga District ==
- Emuhaya
- Hamisi
- Sabatia
- Vihiga
- Mbale
- Majengo
- Chavakali

== Wajir District ==
- Buna
- Bute
- Central Wajir
- Griftu
- Habaswein
- Wajir-bor

== West Pokot District ==
- Alale
- Chepareria
- Kacheliba
- Kapenguria
- Sigor

The divisions are subdivided into approximately 1,088 "locations" (mtaa) and then "sublocations" (kata ndogo). A province is administered by a Provincial Commissioner (PC).

Kenyan local authorities mostly do not follow common boundaries with divisions. They are classified as City, Municipality, Town or County councils.

A third discrete type of classification are constituencies. They are further subdivided into wards.

== See also ==
- Provinces of Kenya
- Districts of Kenya
