= Webuye West Constituency =

Electoral constituency in Kenya

Webuye West
- constituency for the Parliament of Kenya
- Webuye West Constituency within Bungoma County

- Bungoma County within Kenya
- County: Bungoma
- Population: 152,515
- Area: 239 km^{2} (92.3 sq mi)

Current constituency
- Number of members: 1
- Party: UDA
- Member of Parliament: Daniel Wanyama
- Wards: 4

Webuye West is a constituency in Kenya. It is one of nine constituencies in Bungoma County.

The constituency is located on the eastern region of Bungoma County and comprises four wards: Matulo, Misikhu, Bokoli, and Sitikho Wards. Webuye West was hived from the original Webuye Constituency together with Webuye East prior to the 2013 General Elections. The constituency lies within coordinates: 0º 37’ 0’ North, 34º46’0’ East. The registered voters were 58,632 as per IEBC 2022 election register.

Matulo ward has Township location which comprises Matulo and Township sublocations.

Misikhu ward has Sirende location which has Sirende, Mukhe, and Misikhu sublocations and Misikhu location which comprises Kituni and Malaha sublocations.

Bokoli ward comprises Bokoli location, which has Bokoli and Mahanga sublocations, and Miendo location which has Miendo and Matisi sublocations.

Sitikho ward has Sitikho location which has Milo, Khalumuli, and Sitikho sublocations. In the regional context, Webuye West constituency is bordered by Kimilili Constituency to the north, Webuye East constituency to the North East, Kanduyi constituency to the south west, Kabuchai constituency to the West and Kakamega county to the South.

== Member of Parliament ==
Elections	MP	Party	Notes
2017	Daniel Sitati Wanyama	Jubilee Party	
2022	Daniel Sitati Wanyama	United Democratic Alliance (Kenya)	
