= 2013 Bungoma local elections =

Past local election in Kenya

Local elections were held in Bungoma County to elect a Governor and County Assembly on 4 March 2013. Under the new constitution, which was passed in a 2010 referendum, the 2013 general elections were the first in which Governors and members of the County Assemblies for the newly created counties were elected. They will also be the first general elections run by the Independent Electoral and Boundaries Commission(IEBC)which has released the official list of candidates.

== Gubernatorial election ==
Candidate	Running Mate	Coalition	Party	Votes
Khangati, Alfred	Mukholi, John Kaukha	Cord	Orange Democratic Movement	--
Lusaka, Kenneth Makelo	Chongwony, Hilary Moywo		New Ford Kenya	--
Cosmas Barasa Simiyu	Mukholi, John		The National Alliance	--
Tumwa, Jack Beneiah	Pkania, Kennedy		FORD-KENYA	--
Wabwoba, Mukhamule Walinywa	Chesori, Nick Conchellah		United Democratic Forum Party	--

== Prospective candidates ==
The following are some of the candidates who have made public their intentions to run:

- Alfred Khangati - Internal Security assistant minister
- Ken Lusaka - former Livestock Permanent Secretary
- Maurice Makhanu - former North Eastern PC
- Jack Tumwa - a former commissioner of the defunct Electoral Commission of Kenya
- Wabwoba Walinywa - former journalist .
