= Wakoli Bifwoli =

Kenyan politician

Honourable Wakoli Bifwoli MP

Assistant Minister of Lands
- In office 2008 – January 2013
- Minister: James Orengo

Member of the Kenyan Parliament
- In office 2003 – 4 March 2013
- Preceded by: Lawrence Sifuna
- Succeeded by: Boniface Otsyula
- Constituency: Bumula

Personal details
- Born: 1952 (age 73–74)
- Party: FORD-KENYA
- Spouse: Margaret Wakoli
- Children: 9
- Education: Kampala International University; Kibabii University
- Profession: Teacher

Sylvester Wakoli Bifwoli (born 1952) is a Kenyan politician. He is a member of the Ford-Kenya political party, an affiliate of the Party of National Unity. He was elected to represent Bumula Constituency in Bungoma County, in the National Assembly of Kenya in the 2007 Kenyan parliamentary election. He also served as an Assistant Minister in the Ministry of Lands in Kenya's Grand Coalition Government.

== Early life and education ==
He was born in Bumula, Bungoma County. Bifwoli began his primary education at Bumula Primary School and later transferred to St Peter's Seminary in Mukumu where he also completed his East African Certificate of Education in 1972.

For his degree, Bifwoli graduated with a Bachelor of Arts in Conflict Management in 2013 from Kampala International University and later enrolled in a Master of Arts in Religious Philosophy in 2015, completing it in 2016 from Kibabii University. In December 2022, he graduated from Kibabii University with a PhD in Philosophy of Religion.

== Career ==
He is a teacher by profession and began his career at Napwa Primary School in Bumula and later went to Luyia Primary School. He became a deputy head teacher in 1981 and was posted in Lurende Primary School before becoming the head teacher at Kassos Primary School in 1983.

Bifwoli was the Kenya National Union of Teachers branch vice chairman from 1988 and became the chairman in 1989. He became the executive secretary of the union in 1996.

=== Political career ===
He was first elected into Parliament in 2002, succeeding Lawrence Sifuna. A career trade unionist and teacher, Wakoli has distinguished himself as a performer. Wakoli Bifwoli, as he prefers to be referred to, had stated his desire to run for Kenya's presidency in the 2012 national elections. He had vowed to legalize busaa, a traditional brew, if he did assume the presidency. He has also repeatedly called for Kenyans to desist from placing undue value on land.

His representation of the Bumula Constituency continued for a second term when he was re-elected in the 2007 general elections and also served in the Kibaki government as the assistant minister of lands. He took a break from politics in 2013 after losing the Bumula parliamentary race to Boniface Otsyula by 6,700 votes.

In 2022, Bifwoli was running for the Bumula parliamentary seat on an independent ticket and lost to Jack Wamboka of the Democratic Alliance Party of Kenya (DAP-K).
