= St. Luke's Boys' High School =

Catholic school in Kenya

Coordinates: 0.78595°N 34.71265°E

- Kimilili; Kenya

Information
- Former name: Kimilili Boys' High School
- Type: High school
- Motto: "Discipline, Hardwork, Success"
- Established: 2 June 1968
- Founders: Henry Makila; Francis Munyakho
- Chief Principal: Siro I. Bichage
- Website: stlukesboyskimilili.gt.tc

St. Luke's Boys' High School, Kimilili is a public boys' boarding school located in Kimilili, near Bungoma in Kenya's Western Province. It was known as Kimilili Boys' High School until January 2009. It is classed as an extra county school.

== History ==
The school was opened on June 2, 1968. Officially, it operated "illegally" until August of that year, which led to its closure by the Area Education Officer. The Ministry of Education Permanent Secretary then helped in restarting and re-registering the school. The school was initially mixed, with the first students being 35 boys and 5 girls.

Patrick Wandili was Chief Principal of the school from 2007 to 2017, when he was transferred to Mukumu Boys High School in Kakamega County. He was later the Chief Officer for Health and Sanitation in Bungoma County. He is standing for Kimilili Constituency MP in the 2027 Kenyan general election and has been endorsed by current MP Didmus Barasa, who is running for Governor of Bungoma.

=== Student unrest ===
In January 2021, students at St Luke's engaged in violent protests after a student was allegedly assaulted by a school prefect. During the unrest the several windows were smashed, and students were dispersed by the local police.

=== Fires ===
In June 2022, the Nabwala House dormitory at the school was destroyed by a fire. The dormitory housed 198 of the school's students. No students were killed, but the school's principal Innocent Siro stated that the property of 170 boys had been damaged. Nine students at the school were subsequently arrested.

== Sports ==
The school is noted for its consistently excellent performance at handball. The school competes in the national handball league under the name Wakanda, and has consistently been one of the top teams at handball in Kenya.

St. Luke's are a fixture of the East Africa School Games, a long-running international championship organised by the Federation of East Africa Secondary Schools Sports Associations (FEASSSA). They have been the FEASSSA handball champions three times: in 2004, 2016, and 2025. Kimilili are the only Kenyan team to have ever won the handball championship.

Most recently, the St. Luke's Kimilili team were the FEASSSA handball champions in 2025. The win was considered a significant achievement for Kenya due to the traditional dominance of Uganda and Rwanda at handball.

== Sponsorship and partnerships ==
The school benefits from a number of international sponsors, many of which are the result of teacher-exchange programmes of the 1970–2000 period.

Geraint Jenkins is the most notable foreign figure involved with the school. He was a former teacher at the school and was later Head of Geography at de Stafford School in England, where he set up the de Stafford Kenya Fund to support children in Kimilili.

The school has been supported by the de Stafford Kenya Project since 1984, which was later re-established as Community Health and Education for Children of Kimilili (CHECK) in 2010. de Stafford/CHECK has supported construction of school buildings, and also sends equipment to St Luke's. Additionally, some students have their school fees paid for by CHECK. Mr. Jenkins also gives prizes to the top performers in the Kenya Certificate of Secondary Education.

There are also sponsors from the Netherlands like Stichting Harambee Holland (Harambee Foundation Holland). The foundation was set up by Roel Meijers (who was a teacher at the school from 1974-1976) and his family. The foundation helped with construction of science classrooms.

In July/August 2020 the school's finances were subjected to an audit by the Ministry of Education, Science and Technology as part of an investigation into embezzlement of public school funds. The audit was discussed by the National Assembly in December 2020, during which Kimilili MP Didmus Barasa asked about the usage of funds from CHECK since 2007.

== Awards and recognition ==
In 2026, students from the school's robotics club Saint Raptors were the winners in the Senior Category of AI for Good's 2026 Robotics for Good Youth Challenge in Kenya. As part of the prize, the students won tickets to in represent Kenya at the AI for Good Global Summit in Geneva, Switzerland, where they competed in the Grand Finale. Additionally, the school placed 3rd in the Technology and Digital Skills (STEM) (High Schools) category of the 2026 Great Places to School Awards.

== Alumni ==
Kimilili MP Didmus Barasa attended the school between 1996 and 2000.

In July 2009 the school began its alumni association, Kimilili Old Boys Association, which has members worldwide.

== See also ==
- Education in Kenya
- List of schools in Kenya
