= Webuye Constituency =

Webuye Constituency was an electoral constituency in Kenya. It was one of five constituencies in Bungoma District. The constituency was established for the 1988 elections. It has since been divided into Webuye East Constituency and Webuye West Constituency.

== Members of Parliament ==
Elections	MP	Party	Notes
1988	Joash Mang’oli	KANU	One-party system.
1992	Musikari Kombo	Ford-K	
1994	Saulo Wanambisi Busolo	Ford-K	By-elections
1997	Musikari Kombo	Ford-K	
2002	Musikari Kombo	NARC	
2007	Alfred Sambu	ODM	

== Wards ==
Wards
Ward	Registered Voters	Local Authority
Bokoli	8,354	Bungoma County
Chetambe	11,219	Bungoma County
Misikhu	8,120	Bungoma County
Nabuyole	5,681	Webuye municipality
Ndivisi	10,319	Bungoma County
Sitikho	7,758	Bungoma County
Webuye Central	2,883	Webuye municipality
Webuye North	3,847	Webuye municipality
Webuye South	2,419	Webuye municipality
Webuye West	2,806	Webuye municipality
Total	63,406	
*September 2005.
