= Linet Masai =

Kenyan long-distance runner (born 1989)

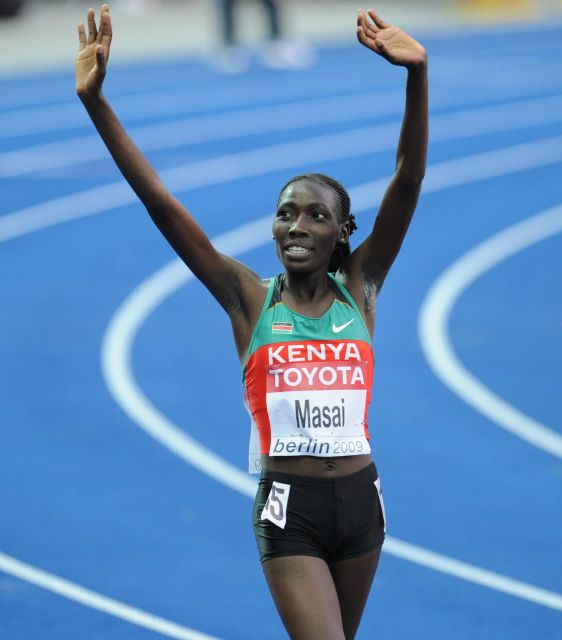

Personal information
- Born: 5 December 1989 (age 36) Kapsokwony, Mount Elgon District, Kenya
Medal record
Women's athletics
Representing Kenya
Olympic Games
Bronze medal – third place	2008 Beijing	10,000 m
World Championships
Gold medal – first place	2009 Berlin	10,000 m
Bronze medal – third place	2011 Daegu	10,000 m
World Cross Country Championships
Gold medal – first place	2007 Mombasa	Junior race
Silver medal – second place	2009 Amman	Senior race
Silver medal – second place	2010 Bydgoszcz	Senior race
Silver medal – second place	2011 Punta Umbria	Senior race
Bronze medal – third place	2008 Edinburgh	Senior race
African Championships
Bronze medal – third place	2010 Nairobi	10,000 m

Linet Chepkwemoi Masai (born 5 December 1989) is a Kenyan professional long-distance runner who competes in track and cross country running events. She won her first world title in the 10,000 metres at the 2009 World Championships in Athletics.

Masai became the world junior cross country champion in 2007 and set a world junior record for the 10,000 metres at the 2008 Summer Olympics, placing fourth in the final. In 2017 she was awarded the olympic bronze medal after the initial silver medallist Elvan Abeylegesse tested positive for a banned steroid in a retest of her 2007 doping sample, thus Masai became the first Kenyan woman to win a medal in a 10,000m olympic event. She was the runner-up at the IAAF World Cross Country Championships three times consecutively from 2009 to 2011. At the 2011 World Championships in Athletics, she won her second world track medal, taking third in the 10,000 m.

== Biography ==
Masai was born in Kapsokwony town, Mount Elgon District, and was raised in from Bugaa village, four kilometres away. Born to John Barasa Masai and Leonida Cherop, she is the fourth born out of ten children. She went to Kapsagom Primary School and then Bishop Okiring Secondary school from where she graduated in 2005. She started running in 2005, when her older brother Moses Ndiema Masai won 5000 and 10000 metres at the African Junior Championships, hoping she would emulate his success. Her younger siblings Dennis, Ndiema and Magdaline are also runners. Their father John Barasa Masai is also a former runner, while Ben Jipcho is their distant uncle. She is based at the PACE Sports Management training camp in Kaptagat.

== Career ==
She won the women's junior race at the 2007 IAAF World Cross Country Championships held in Mombasa, Kenya. She finished fourth at the Kenyan trials for the 2007 World Championships 5000 metres race, missing the ticket to Osaka. She did, however, compete at the 2007 IAAF World Athletics Final, achieving two fourth places (3000 and 5000 metres).

Her breakthrough year came in 2008. In the spring she won the bronze medal in the senior race at the 2008 World Cross Country Championships. In the summer she competed at the Olympic Games, finishing third in the 10,000 metres in a new world junior record of 30:26.50 minutes. The previous record (30:31.55) was set by Huina Xing of China in 2003. It was also a new Kenyan record, the previous record (30:30.26) was held by Edith Masai and was set in 2005. Masai's national record stood for less than a year, since in June 2009 Florence Kiplagat posted 30:11.53 in Utrecht, the Netherlands

In August 2009, Masai narrowly defeated Meselech Melkamu of Ethiopia in the final of the 10,000 metres at the 2009 IAAF World Championships in Athletics held in Berlin, Germany. The reigning 10000 metres Olympic and world champion Tirunesh Dibaba was sidelined due to injury. She was also awarded the Race Results Weekly Female Runner of the Year award and the Kenyan Sportswoman of the Year award in 2009.

She began the buildup to her 2010 World Cross Country campaign with wins at the Cross Internacional Valle de Llodio and Cross Internacional de Soria, beating the rest of the field by some distance both times. A win at the Cross Internacional de Itálica shortly after demonstrated her dominance of the Spanish circuit that year. At the 2010 World Cross Country Championships, she started strongly and began to build up a lead in the final lap. However, Emily Chebet overtook her with a sprint finish to the race, leaving Masai as the runner-up for the second time in as many years.

Later on that year she made her debut at the NYRR New York Mini 10K – her first competition on American soil. Masai outran Emily Chebet in the road running event to take the victory in a time of 30:48. In August she signed up for the Women's 5K Challenge in London and comfortably beat Sylvia Kibet to win the race, reversing their positions from the previous year's competition. She entered the 10,000 m at the 2010 African Championships in Athletics but Tirunesh Dibaba defended her title while the Kenyan left with a bronze medal. At the Memorial van Damme (the final for the 2010 IAAF Diamond League) she finished third as compatriot Vivian Cheruiyot took the inaugural event title.

She opened her cross country season with a win at the Cross de l'Acier in November. She was the women's winner at the Great Edinburgh Cross Country in January 2011, but had to settle for second at the Cross de Itálica behind Cheruiyot. She defeated Cheruiyot to win at the Kenyan Cross Country Championships and set her eyes on the world title, saying that she remained bitter about not winning at the two previous competitions. History repeated itself for a third time for Masai at the 2011 IAAF World Cross Country Championships as she led early on but was pushed into second place by a Kenyan rival yet again in the form of a quick-finishing Cheruiyot. She repeated as New York Mini champion in June with half a minute to spare over runner-up Aheza Kiros.

On the 2011 IAAF Diamond League circuit she placed in the top three in Shanghai, Eugene, and the final in Zürich, but was someway behind Vivian Cheruiyot, who defended her 5000 m title. At the 2011 World Championships in Athletics, Masai entered both the 5000 m and 10,000 m events. Her attempted defence over the longer distance was thwarted by Cheruiyot: Masai was beaten into third place in a sprint finish, although this was part of a dominant Kenyan team which took the top four places. She was amid the leading pack in the 5000 m race, but was again out-sprinted in the final stretch, leaving her in sixth place.

Her cross country season began well as she won both the Cross de Atapuerca and Cross de Itálica by large margins. She finished behind Cheruiyot and Joyce Chepkirui at the World's Best 10K in February. She had a comfortable win at the Great Manchester Run in May. She failed to finish the Kenyan 10,000 m trial race in June, making it the first time since 2008 that she would not compete internationally in the event. A seventh-place finish in the 5000 m at the Kenyan Olympic trials meant that she would not compete at the Olympics in any event. She was third at the London Grand Prix in July – her only other 5000 m outing that year. She was runner-up at both the Cross de Atapuerca and the San Silvestre Vallecana.

== Achievements ==
Year	Competition	Venue	Position	Event	Notes
2007	World Cross Country Championships	Mombasa, Kenya	1st	Junior race	
2007	World Athletics Final	Stuttgart, Germany	4th	3000 m	
2007	World Athletics Final	Stuttgart, Germany	4th	5000 m	
2008	World Cross Country Championships	Edinburgh, United Kingdom	3rd	Senior race	
2008	World Cross Country Championships	Edinburgh, United Kingdom	2nd	Team competition	
2008	Olympic Games	Beijing, China	3rd	10,000 m	
2008	World Athletics Final	Stuttgart, Germany	5th	3000 m	
2008	World Athletics Final	Stuttgart, Germany	4th	5000 m	
2009	World Cross Country Championships	Amman, Jordan	2nd	Long race	
2009	World Cross Country Championships	Amman, Jordan	1st	Team	
2009	World Championships	Berlin, Germany	1st	10,000 m	
2010	World Cross Country Championships	Bydgoszcz, Poland	2nd	Senior race	
2010	World Cross Country Championships	Bydgoszcz, Poland	1st	Team	
2011	World Cross Country Championships	Punta Umbría, Spain	2nd	Senior race	
2011	World Cross Country Championships	Punta Umbría, Spain	1st	Team	
2011	World Championships in Athletics	Daegu, South Korea	6th	5000 m	
2011	World Championships in Athletics	Daegu, South Korea	3rd	10,000 m	

=== Personal bests ===
- 3000 metres – 8:38.97 min (2007)
- 5000 metres – 14:31.14 min (2010)
- 10,000 metres – 30:26.50 min (2008)
- 10 kilometres – 30:48 min (2010)
