= Musikari Kombo =

Kenyan politician

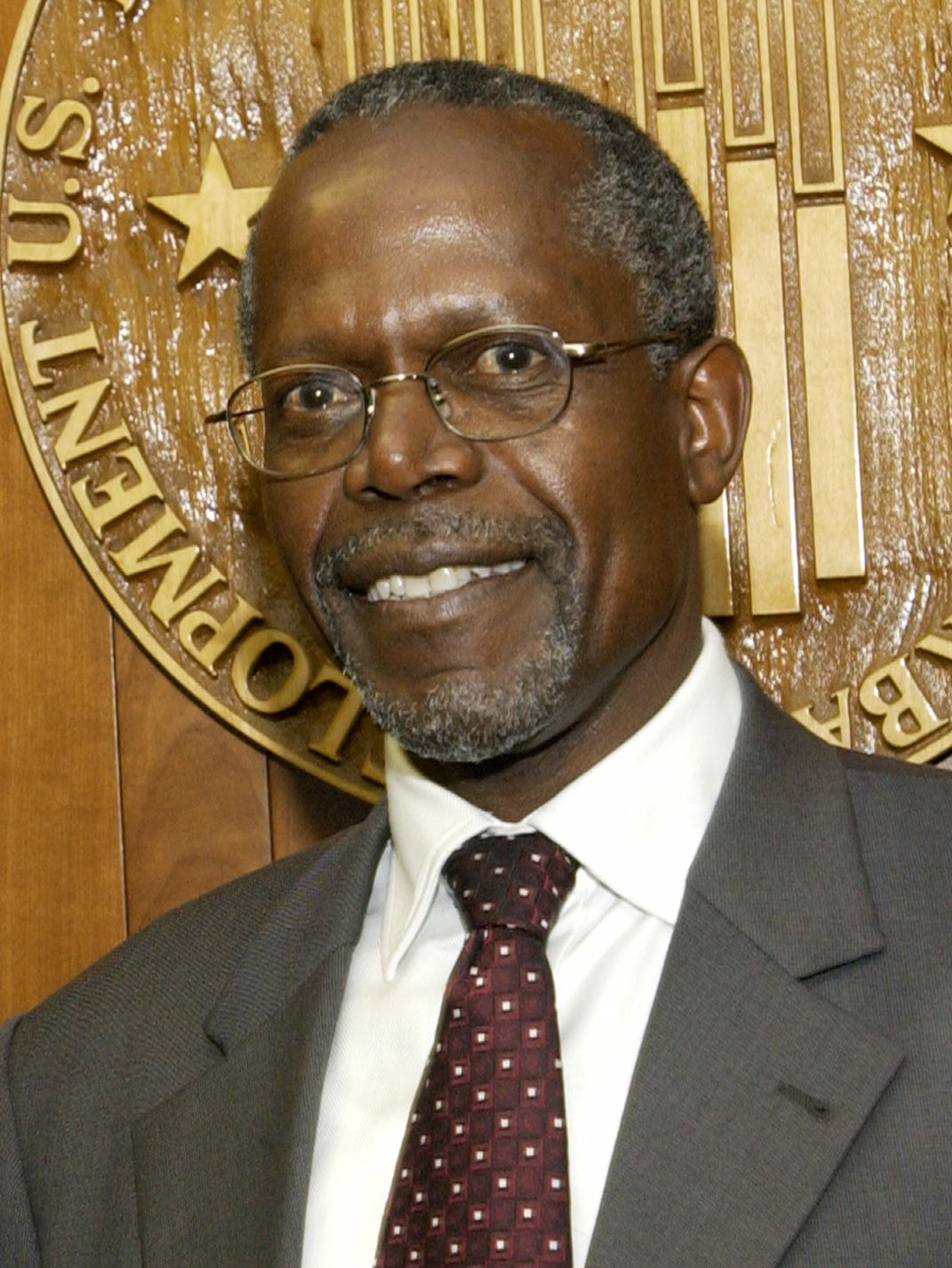
Musikari N. Kombo

Musikari Nazi Kombo (born March 13, 1944) is a Kenyan politician who serves as a nominated Member of Parliament.

Born in Bungoma District, he attended Misikhu Primary School for his elementary education, then proceeded to Rakwaro Primary School, and finally moved to Mumias where he completed his primary education. He then attended Nyeri High School for his secondary education. He undertook his undergraduate studies at the University of Nairobi, majoring in economics.

He was first elected as a Member of Parliament representing Webuye Constituency in 1992. He also served in the Government as Assistant Minister for Planning and Minister for Regional Development. He took over the Local Government Ministry in late 2003. He lost his seat as MP for Webuye in the 2007 general election, in which he was defeated by the Orange Democratic Movement (ODM) candidate Alfred Sambu.

As of June 2015, Kombo is the Chairman of FORD-Kenya.

== Personal life ==
Musikari Kombo hails from the larger Luhya community Bukusu sub tribe Balunda clan (descendants of Mulunda, believed to have migrated into Congo from East Africa).

He is a Catholic by religion.
