= Edwin Sifuna =

Kenyan politician

The Honourable Edwin Sifuna
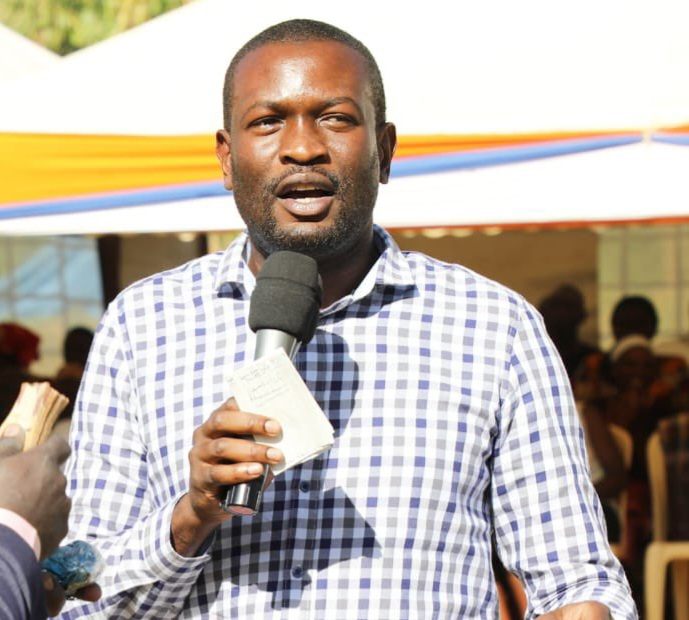
- Sifuna in 2024

Senator of Nairobi City County
- Incumbent
- Assumed office 8 September 2022
- Preceded by: Johnson Sakaja

Personal details
- Born: Edwin Watenya Sifuna; 22 May 1982 (age 44) Mumias, Kakamega District, Western Province, Kenya
- Party: The Equitable Party (TEP)
- Education: University of Nairobi (LL.B); Kenya School of Law (KSL. Dip Law)
- Occupation: Politician
- Profession: Lawyer
- Website: edwinsifuna.com

Edwin Watenya Sifuna (born 22 May 1982) is a Kenyan politician and the current Senator of Nairobi County after being elected in the 2022 Kenyan general election. He served as the deputy minority whip in the Senate of Kenya. He served as the Secretary General of the ODM party from 2018 to 9 July 2026.

== Early life and education ==
Sifuna started his formal education at Kakamega Township Primary School and later on joined Musingu High School, where he sat his KCSE exams. Thereafter, he pursued a Bachelor of Laws degree from the University of Nairobi, graduating in 2006. After receiving his postgraduate diploma from the Kenya School of Law in 2007, Sifuna did his pupilage at Kairu & McCourt Advocates in Nairobi and was thereafter admitted to the Roll of Advocates in 2008.

== Political career ==
In 2013, Sifuna became a member of CORD as a Technical/Advisory Committee Member for three years before joining NASA in the same capacity. In the 2017 Kenyan general election, Edwin Sifuna expressed his interest to vie for the Kanduyi Constituency Member of Parliament seat on an ODM Party ticket. He was, however, not successful during the primaries in April where he lost to John Makali.

With only about two months to the general elections in August, ODM fronted Sifuna as their preferred candidate to contest the Nairobi senatorial seat then held by Mike Sonko. He polled 674,056 votes (42.51%) against winner Johnson Sakaja who got 811,826 votes (51.20%).

In 2019, he was elected to serve as the vice-chair of the Centre for Multiparty Democracy (CMD).

Sifuna wakati wa mazishi ya Hayati Raila

On 23 February 2018, Sifuna was picked as the Secretary-General of ODM party to replace Ababu Namwamba. On 11 February 2026, he was removed as Secretary General by the National Executive Committee (NEC) in absentia. Sifuna petitioned to the Political Parties Disputes Tribunal (PPDT), which on 12 February, ruled to temporarily prevent the Orange Democratic Movement from executing his removal. After months of political tussle for the position, the Registrar of Political Parties John Cox Lorionokou, on 9 July said that his removal followed the Political Parties Act (Cap 7D) and ODM's constitution. This effectively removed him from the position.

=== Linda Mwananchi ===
On 4 October 2026, he was unveiled as the Party Leader of The Equitable Party and it's presidential flag bearer for the 2027 general election at a high profile convention in Nairobi. The Equitable Party was founded by Dr.Gilbert Marava Shanga, Dr.Saisi former Deputy Governor of Vihiga, Mr.Juma Isiji, Hon.Nixon Butiya former Deputy Speaker for Vihiga, Mrs Eunice Mugala Juma among others in March 2022. Dr.Marava then transacted the party leadership to Sifuna, as the latter met bureaucratic huddles registering a party on his own. Sifuna's team at first tried through the late Cyrus Jirongo's Party UDP(United Democratic party) but internal disputes arouse and ruined the planned transfer.

On 30th October 2026, The Equitable Party changed name to Linda Mwanainchi Movement party and launched the party's headquaters in Nairobi.Opposition Leaders; Kalonzo Musyoka, Eugene Wamalwa, Rigathi Gachagua and Babu Owino among others were present.

=== Senate ===
In the 2022 Kenyan general election, Sifuna once again contested the Nairobi Senatorial seat. He garnered 716,876 to clinch the seat and is now serving the people of Nairobi as their senator. In February 2023, he assumed the role of deputy minority whip in the Senate.

== Personal life ==
Edwin Sifuna was born on 22 May 1982, at St. Mary's Hospital in Mumias, Kakamega County. His father was a civil servant with the defunct Municipal Council and his mother, a now-retired teacher from Moi Primary School in Bungoma. He has two brothers and two sisters. He is married and has a daughter.
