= Moses Ndiema Masai =

Kenyan long-distance runner

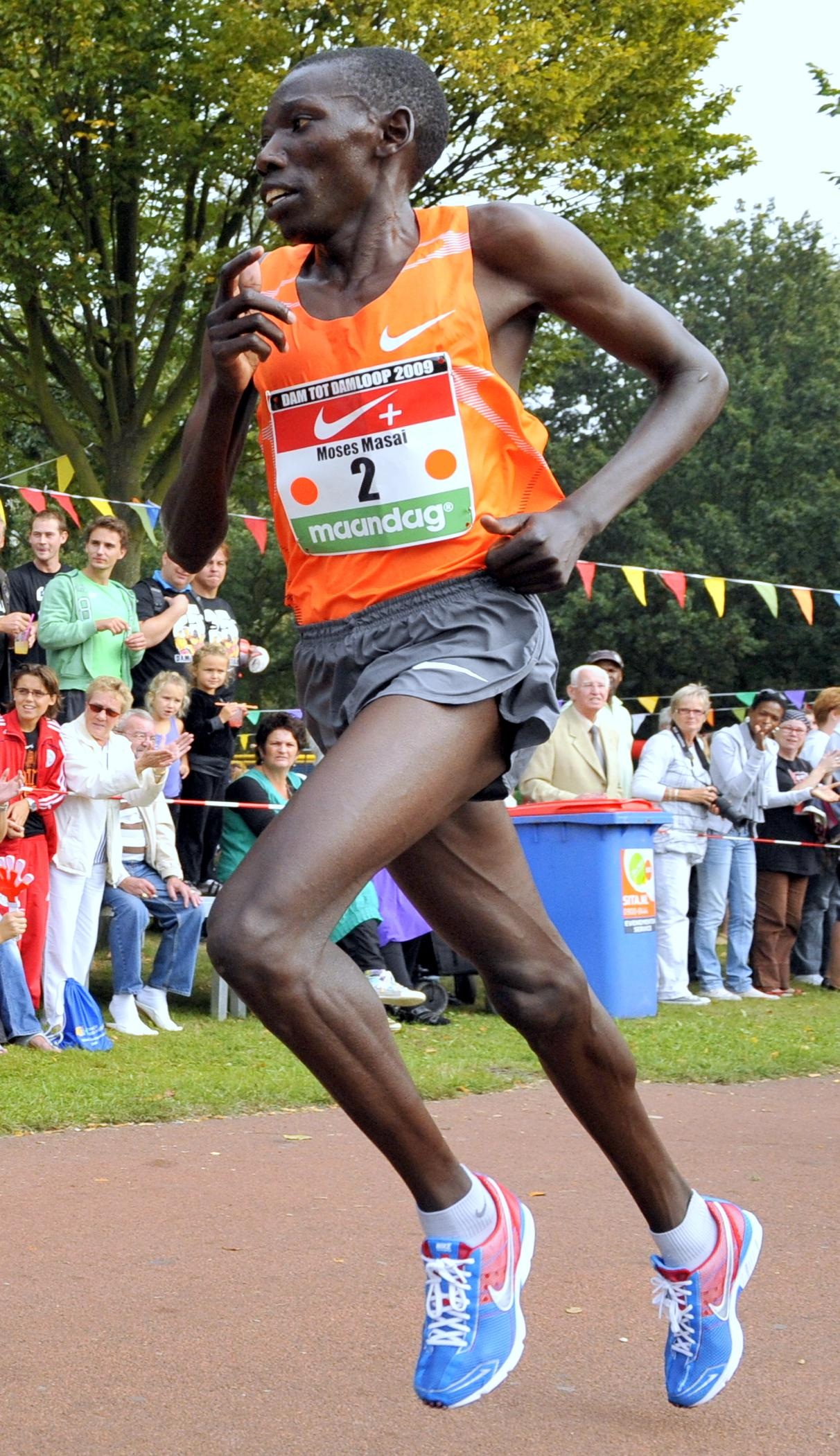

Medal record

Men's athletics

Representing Kenya

World Championships
Bronze medal – third place	2009 Berlin	10000 m

Moses Ndiema Masai (born 1 June 1986 in Kapsogom, Mount Elgon District) is a Kenyan runner who specializes in the 10,000 metres.

Masai is from Bugaa village, four kilometres from Kapsokwony town. Born to John Barasa Masai and Leonida Cherop, he is the first born out of ten children. He started running while at Kapsogom Primary School. Later he joined Bishop Okiring Secondary School. At the 2005 Kenyan Sports Personality of the Year awards he won the most promising sportsman category. He won a bronze medal at the 2007 IAAF World Athletics Final in the 5000 m.

He ran in the 2008 Summer Olympics and managed to finish in fourth position in the 10,000 metres final, narrowly missing out on a medal.

His younger sister, Linet Masai, won the women's 10,000 metres gold at the 2009 World Championships, while he won bronze over the same distance. Other siblings Dennis, Ndiema and Magdaline are also runners. Their father John Barasa Masai is also a former runner, while Ben Jipcho, a legendary athlete, is their distant uncle.

Moses Masai won the 2009 New Year's Eve San Silvestre Vallecana race. He took the World's Best 10K title at the 2010 race in Puerto Rico, scoring a new course record of 27:19 and picking up a bonus for his fast time. He signed up for the Dam tot Damloop in September 2010 and was a close runner-up to John Mwangangi, finishing a second behind his compatriot. He made only three appearances in 2011, running at the FBK Games, Prefontaine Classic and the World's Best 10K, but finished outside the top five on each occasion.

In spite of his low-profile in prior seasons, he gained a place on the Kenyan Olympic team by coming second at the 10,000 m trials at 2012 Prefontaine Classic. Unfortunately, at the Olympics themselves, he could only manage a twelfth-placed finish.

Masai trains with PACE Sports Management. He is married to Doris Changeywo and the couple has a daughter.

He is not to be confused with another Kenyan runner named Moses Masai, known for running marathons and road races in Central Europe.

== Achievements ==
Key: Course record

Year	Competition	Venue	Position	Event	Notes
Representing Kenya
2004	World Junior Championships	Grosseto, Italy	10th	10,000 m	29:32.48
2005	African Junior Championships	Radès, Tunisia	1st	5,000 m	13:45.15
2005	African Junior Championships	Radès, Tunisia	1st	10,000 m	28:30.27
2007	World Athletics Final	Stuttgart, Germany	3rd	5,000 m	13:39.96
2008	World Cross Country Championships	Edinburgh, Scotland	5th	Senior race (12 km)	35:02
2008	World Cross Country Championships	Edinburgh, Scotland	1st	Team competition	39 pts
2009	World Championships	Berlin, Germany	3rd	10,000 m	26:57.39
2010	2010 World's Best 10K	San Juan, Puerto Rico	1st	10,000 m	27:19.0 CR
2013	Okpekpe International Road Race	Okpekpe, Nigeria	1st	10 kilometres	29:39

=== Personal bests ===
- 1,500 metres - 3:42.1 min (2005)
- 3,000 metres - 7:44.75 min (2009)
- 5,000 metres - 12:50.55 min (2008)
- 10,000 metres - 26:49.20 min (2007)
