= Lawrence Sifuna =

Kenyan politician (1946–2023)

The Honourable Lawrence Sifuna

Member of the Kenyan Parliament for Bumula
- In office 1997–2002
- Succeeded by: Sylvester Waakoli Bifwoli

Member of the Kenyan Parliament for Kanduyi
- In office 29 December 1992 – 1997
- Preceded by: Maurice Makhanu

Member of the Kenyan Parliament for Bungoma South
- In office 8 November 1979 – 1988
- Succeeded by: Maurice Makhanu

Personal details
- Born: Lawrence Simiyu Sifuna; 23 January 1946 Colony and Protectorate of Kenya
- Died: 3 December 2023 (aged 77) Eldoret, Uasin Gishu, Kenya
- Resting place: Siritanyi, Kanduyi Constituency, Bungoma
- Citizenship: Kenya
- Party: KANU (1979- 983); FORD-Asili (1992- 1997); FORD-Kenya (1997-2002)
- Other political affiliations: Orange Democratic Movement (2022)
- Spouses: Antonina Mefa Nabangala Sifuna; Rufina Sifuna; Monica Sifuna
- Children: 13
- Occupation: Accountant

Lawrence Simiyu Sifuna (23 January 1946 – 3 December 2023) was a Kenyan politician who was a member of Parliament for Bumula, the first MP of that constituency. He was first elected to the Kenyan Parliament on 8 November 1979 in the then larger Bungoma South constituency. Sifuna was re-elected in 1983 too. He lost to former North Eastern Provincial Commissioner Maurice Makhanu in the 1988 Kenyan general election after the Bungoma South constituency was renamed Kanduyi. Sifuna recaptured the seat during the first multi-party 1992 Kenyan general election on a Ford Asili ticket.

== Early life and education ==
Sifuna went to Sang'alo School and Nalondo Intermediate School before he moved to Mariri College in Uganda, where he sat for the Cambridge General Certificate of Education (CGCE) examination. He was a fully trained chartered accountant, a Fellow of Chartered Accountants (FCA) and a Fellow of the Association of International Accountants (FAIA). Sifuna was a household name in Bungoma County popular for defending the welfare of sugarcane growers.

== Career ==
Sifuna served as a member of parliament for the Bungoma South constituency from 1979 to 1983, when he was re-elected on the Kenya African National Union party ticket, which ended in 1988.

In the 1988 election, Bungoma South constituency was subdivided into smaller constituencies and he lost the seat to Maurice Makhanu for the Kanduyi member of parliament seat. He was elected to represent Kanduyi in the December 29, 1992 election under the Forum for the Restoration of Democracy - Asili party ticket to serve till 1997. Bumula constituency was established ahead of the 1997 elections, for which he contested its representation and won till 2002.

On the national stage, Sifuna was remembered as one of the left-wing members of parliament in the 1980s (a.k.a. the seven bearded sisters) who persistently attacked Attorney General Charles Njonjo and government policies that clamped down on the basic human rights of Kenyans. Others included Koigi wa Wamwere, James Orengo, Abuya Abuya, Chibule wa Tsuma, Onyango Midika, Mwashengu wa Mwachofi and Philomena Chelangat Mutai. They were part of the larger group that fought for Kenya's second liberation, Omumutilu, Kenya's Second Liberation Fighter and a member of the bearded sisters.

== Personal life ==
Sifuna is the uncle to the current Nairobi senator, Edwin Sifuna. He died on 2 December 2023, at the age of 77 in Eldoret while receiving treatment.
