= Didmus Wekesa Barasa =

Kenyan politician

Didmus Wekesa Barasa is a Kenyan politician and ex-military officer (Kenya Defense Forces technical wing). He is the current member of parliament representing Kimilili constituency since 2017.

He became affiliated to the United Democratic Alliance party shortly after his exit from the Jubilee Party in 2021. Barasa is a former member of Amani Peace Coalition (2013), United Democratic Forum Party (2016) and the Jubilee Party.

Barasa is standing for Governor of Bungoma in the 2027 Kenyan general election.

== Early life ==
Barasa has been private about his early life. He attended Kimilili Boys' High School (now St. Luke's Boys' High School) from 1996 to 2000.

In 2026 Barasa's university qualifications became a subject of enquiry. Barasa's parliamentary profile stated that he had graduated from Jomo Kenyatta University of Agriculture and Technology in May 2008. However, the university claimed that the certificate was not genuine. Barasa subsequently stated that he had attended Mount Kenya University, not JKUAT.

== 2017 election and first term ==
Barasa was elected as the MP of Kimilili in 2017.

Barasa is a member of the Departmental Committee on Administration & National Security as well as the Parliamentary Powers and Privileges Committee. He is not noted to have sponsored any bills during his first term.

== 2022 re-election and shooting charges ==
On August 9, 2022, voting day of the 2022 Kenya general election, Barasa was implicated in the shooting of Brian Olunga. Olunga was an aide to Brian Khaemba of the DAP-K, an aspirant for the Kimilili Constituency parliamentary seat that Barasa was also standing for in the 2022 General Elections.

During the vote count in Kibingei Ward an altercation reportedly broke out between Barasa and Khaemba. The 21-year-old Olunga was shot in the side of the head after Khaemba left to get in his car and later died of blood loss on his way to hospital.

After the shooting Barasa went into hiding, and was not present to be certificated as the winner of the election. On August 11 he turned himself in to the police saying he had seen the appeal on television. Barasa was arrested and was subsequently charged with the shooting and killing of Olunga. He was later released on bail of KS10 million (USD$83,000).

The prosecution presented ballistic reports from the DCI National Forensic Laboratory that linked Barasa's firearm to the fatal shot that ended Olunga's life. According to the DCI:

Ballistic experts based at the DCI National Forensic Laboratory linked Hon Barasa's firearm to the fatal shot that took away Olunga's life. This followed a report issued by the ballistic experts after the investigating team forwarded Hon Barasa’s Glock Pistol.

A cartridge and bullet fragments were taken to the ballistic lab for forensic analysis. The report noted that the recovered cartridge was fired by the Glock pistol issued to Hon Barasa.

After a 10-month trial, Didmus Barasa was found innocent and freed by the High Court in Bungoma. In the judgement delivery on the case, Lady Justice Rose Ougo noted that the prosecution submitted insufficient evidence.

== 2027 general election ==
In 2025 Barasa declared his intention to run for Governor of Bungoma during his second term as an MP.

A poll from Darubini POLL published in May 2026 showed Barasa to the frontrunner in the race, with 64% support. His opponent Tim Wanyonyi had 27% in the same poll.

In July 2026, Barasa endorsed Patrick Wandili as his successor for Kimilili MP. Wandili is the former Bungoma County Chief Officer for Health and Sanitation, as well as the former Principal of St. Luke's Boys' Kimilili.

In October 2026, Barasa announced his opposition to the re-election of the National Assembly Speaker Moses Wetang'ula. He indicated that his decision was partly due to a popular belief that Wetang'ula favoured his brother Tim Wanyonyi over Barasa for familial rather than political reasons, stating, "Bungoma is not a monarchy. It is a democracy premised on merit, competition, and the sovereign will of the people, not hereditary succession."
