= John Chikati =

FORD-Kenya Secretary General, MP Tongaren

Hon. (Dr.) John Chikati MP, Tongaren Constituency
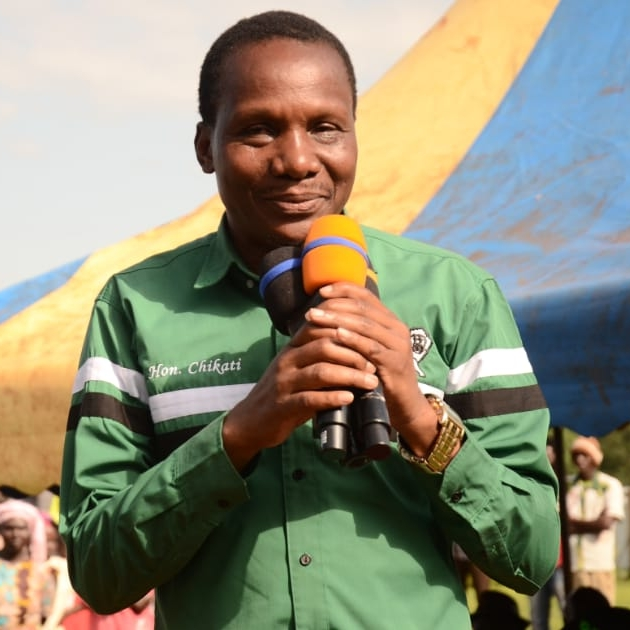

Member of National Assembly
- Incumbent
- Assumed office 8 September 2022
- President: William Samoei Ruto
- Preceded by: David Eseli Simiyu
- Constituency: Tongaren Constituency

Secretary for Strategy and Delivery
- In office 2018 – March 2022
- President: Uhuru Kenyatta

Personal details
- Born: 15 November 1962 (age 63) Bungoma, Kenya
- Citizenship: Kenyan
- Party: FORD-Kenya
- Spouse: Janepher Barasa
- Education: University of Nairobi
- Website: www.johnchikati.com

John Murumba Chikati (born 15 November 1962) is a Kenyan politician and the current Secretary General for the Forum for the Restoration of Democracy – Kenya (FORD-Kenya). Chikati is also the current Member of National Assembly for Tongaren Constituency, and the current Secretary General for Catholic MPs Spiritual Support Initiative (CAMPSSI). He is the immediate former Special Secretary for Strategy and Delivery in the Office of the Deputy President.

== Early life and education ==
Dr. Chikati is an Adjunct Faculty in the Project Management Department of the Commonwealth Open University.

In 1976-1977, he attended Ortum Primary, where he gained a Certificate of Primary Education (CPE).

In 1978, Dr. Chikati joined Teremi Secondary School, Bungoma, where he completed a Kenya Ordinary Level Certificate (Form 4) in 1981. He later joined Mother Of Apostles Seminary for Form 5 and Form 6, advanced level education, graduating in 1982 with a Kenya Advanced Level Certificate ( Form 6).

Dr. Chikati joined the University of Nairobi in 1985 to study history, graduating in 1989 with a B.A. in History. Later, in 1990, he would join Commonwealth Open University for a masters degree in project management. He graduated with Master Of Science, Project Management degree in 1991. In 2010, Chikati enrolled for a post graduate program at the same university and graduated with a Phd. Management in 2013.

Dr. Chikati also holds a diploma in Personnel Management & Administration (1991) and a diploma in Modern Management & Administration (1992), both from Cambridge Tutorial College.

== Professional background ==
In 2015, Chikati was appointed by the president Uhuru Kenyatta as a Director at Nzoia Sugar Company where he served until 2017.

In 2018, he was appointed as the Special Secretary for Strategy and Delivery in the Office of the Deputy President William Samoei Ruto where he worked until March 2022.

== Political career ==
=== FORD-Kenya Secretary General ===
In April 2023, the Ford Kenya top organ settled on John Chikati as the party's new Secretary General replaces former Kiminini lawmaker Chris Wamalwa. The party's National Management Committee unanimously picked Chikati during a meeting held at Machakos county's Maanzoni lodge.

=== Member of National Assembly ===
Chikati made his political debut in the 2002 General Election when he sought to vie for the Kimilili parliamentary seat, losing to the then minister for Trade and Industry Minister Mukhisa Kituyi. He returned again in 2007, this time vying on ODM party. However, as fate would have it, he lost to a new entrant Eseli Simiyu. John Chikati vied for Tongaren Constituency parliamentary seat in the 2013 General elections on the United Democratic Forum (UDF) party ticket where he emerged second.

Chikati joined the Jubilee party in the 2017 General elections where he lost to the former FORD-Kenya Secretary General Eseli Simiyu while vying for Member of National Assembly for Tongaren Constituency.

In 2022, while vying on a FORD-Kenya party ticket, Chikati won in the 2022 General elections as the Member of National Assembly for Tongaren Constituency with over 20,000 votes.

== Honors and awards ==
- M.B.S (Moran of the Order of the Burning Spear) Medal By President

== See also ==
- www.johnchikati.com
- 13th Parliament of Kenya
