= Kamisinga =

Kamusinga
- Location within Kenya
- Coordinates: 0.8°N 34.7°E
- Country: Kenya
- County: Bungoma County
- Time zone: UTC+3 (EAT)
- Climate: Am

Kamisinga is a settlement in Kenya's Bungoma County.
