= Chesakaki =

Chesikaki
- Location within Kenya
- Coordinates: 0.8°N 34.5°E
- Country: Kenya
- County: Bungoma County
- Time zone: UTC+3 (EAT)
- Climate: Am

Chesikaki is a settlement in Kenya's Bungoma County. Many rocks and boulders in the village have yellowish dolomite with limonite staining, and occasional apatite crystals.
