= African Library Project =

U.S.-based non-profit organization

- Formation: 2005
- Founder: Chris Bradshaw
- Purpose: Literacy
- Region served: Sub-Saharan Africa
- Website: www.africanlibraryproject.org

The African Library Project (ALP) is a non-profit organization that starts libraries in rural Africa. U.S. volunteers organize book drives and ship books to a library in Africa. ALP partners with governmental and non-governmental organizations in sub-Saharan Africa. The partners process applications from schools and communities that want libraries, distribute the books, and provide training. Schools and communities that receive books provide the library space and staffing. ALP works in Botswana, Ghana, Kenya, Lesotho, Malawi, Sierra Leone, and Uganda.

ALP is a US 501(c)(3) organization founded in 2005 by Chris Bradshaw. In the first eleven years of operation, ALP started over 1,900 libraries in sub-Saharan Africa. To date, ALP has managed the creation of 4,143 libraries containing a total of 4,315,274 books.

== Methods of operation ==
ALP volunteers in the United States collect used, donated books for later shipment to affiliated libraries in Africa. The volunteers then sort, pack, and ship the books via sea container, for eventual delivery to a designated African school or community.

A typical small library is one thousand (mostly paperback) books. As of August 2020, the cost of shipping the books to Africa is about $500: $250 in U.S. domestic postage to mail the books to a consolidation point in New Orleans, Louisiana, and $250 sent to ALP to defray the costs of container shipping.

== Volunteers and Partners ==
ALP volunteers are often high school students or full elementary/middle school classes that work together to collect sufficient books and funds for a library. Volunteers often participate in multiple libraries over longer periods of time.

ALP partner organizations are large governmental and non-governmental organizations that vet schools and communities that want libraries. When the containers arrive, they contain books for 30–60 libraries. The partners distribute them and also provide training and oversight of the libraries.

African Library Partnerships
| Country | Active Since | Partner Organization(s) |
|---|---|---|
| Botswana | 2006 | Botswana Ministry of Education |
| Ghana | 2001 | Michael Lapsley Foundation |
| Kenya | 2017 | Rongo University, Kibabii University |
| Lesotho | 2004 | US Peace Corps Lesotho, Lesotho Ministry of Education and Training (MOET) |
| Malawi | 2009 | Development Aid from People to People (DAPP Malawi), Wungwero Book Foundation (WBF), Malawi Institute of Education (MIE), University of Malawi |
| Sierra Leone | 2013 | Reading Initiative Salone (RISE) Network |
| Uganda | 2019 | Enjuba, Firm Foundation Education Trust (FFET) |

Teachers and administrators of the target schools are given a manual on managing a library based on one developed by Voluntary Service Overseas (VSO). Librarians collect data on usage and attend training provided by the partners and ALP. Librarians from all the countries where ALP is working meet at the biannual Library Summit to share best practices.

Each library requests the specific types of books they need. In addition to the donated books, ALP purchases supplemental books for the libraries: the Junior African Writers Series (JAWS), HIV/AIDS readers (published by Pearson), and Hesperian Health Guides.
