= Kuywa =

- Location within Kenya
- Coordinates: 1°N 34.63°E
- Country: Kenya
- County: Bungoma County
- Time zone: UTC+3 (EAT)
- Climate: Am

Kuywa is a settlement in Kenya's Bungoma County.
