= Kamakuywa =

Kamukuywa
- Location within Kenya
- Coordinates: 0.78°N 34.78°E
- Country: Kenya
- County: Bungoma County
- Time zone: UTC+3 (EAT)
- Climate: Aw

Kamukuywa is a settlement in Kenya's Bungoma County.
