= Kapsakwany =

- Location within Kenya
- Coordinates: 0.85°N 34.72°E
- Country: Kenya
- County: Bungoma County
- Time zone: UTC+3 (EAT)
- Climate: Cfb

Kapsakwany is a settlement in Kenya's Bungoma County.
