= Wafula Wamunyinyi =

Kenyan politician

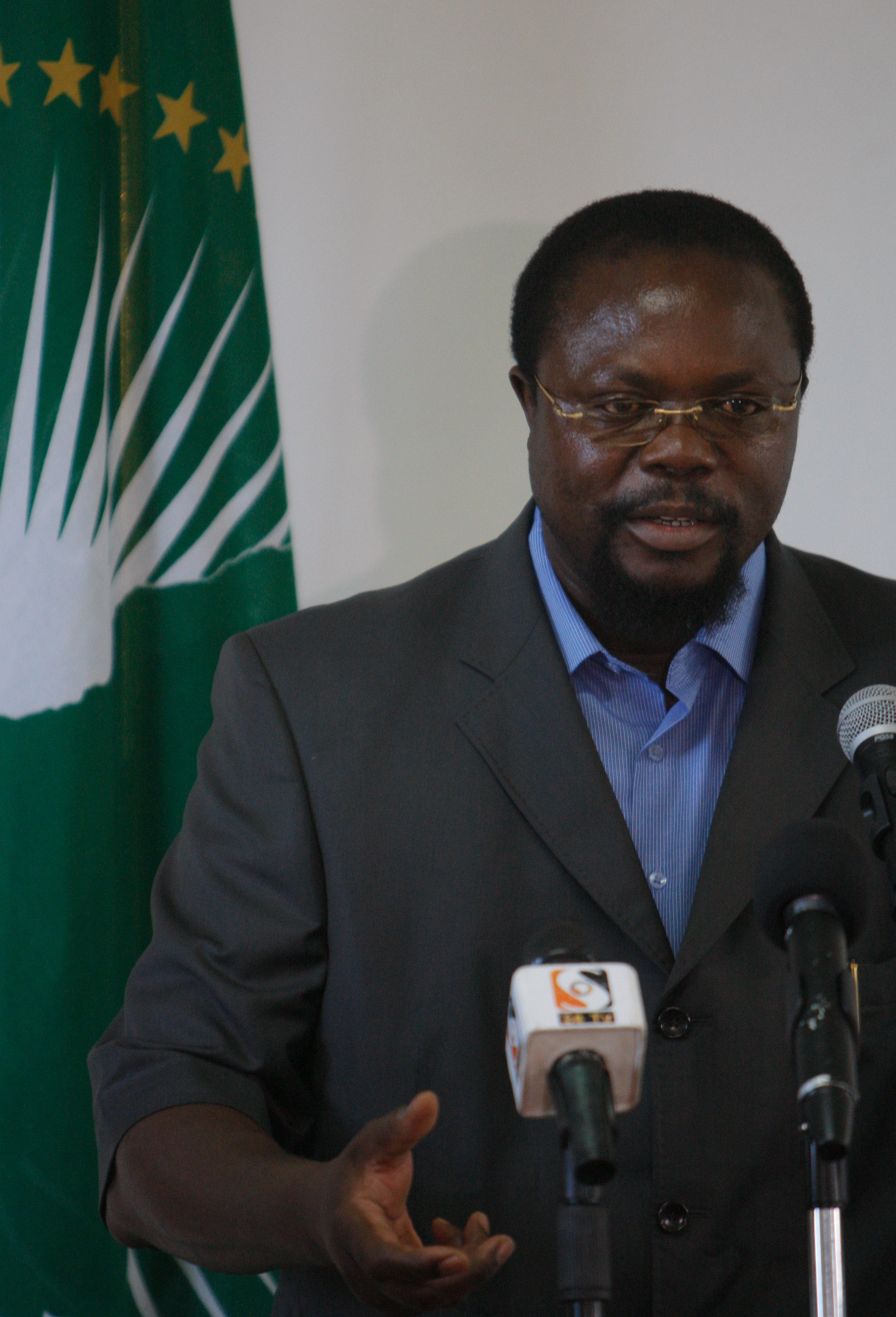

Member of the National Assembly
- In office 1997–2007
- In office 2013–2022

Personal details
- Party: Democratic Action Party

Athanas Misiko Wafula Wamunyinyi is a Kenyan politician who is leader of the Democratic Action Party. He began his career in politics when he was elected as MP for Kanduyi Constituency in 1997. He was in his twenties at the time. Wamunyinyi was re-elected for the same seat in 2002. In the infamous 2007 elections he lost his seat but later re-emerged to serve another 2 consecutive terms from 2013 to 2022.

== Political career ==
He was Deputy Chairperson of the African Union Commission for Somalia.

Wamunyinyi lost his seat to John Makali from Ford-K in the 2022 Kenyan general election. Wafula Wamunyinyi later vied for the senatorial post that was left vacant after the then Bungoma senator Moses Wetangula became speaker of the National Assembly. However, he lost to David Wafula Wakoli, coming at position three behind Mwambu Mabonga.
