= Tongaren Constituency =

Electoral constituency in Kenya

Tongaren
- constituency for the Parliament of Kenya
- Tongaren Constituency within Bungoma County

- Bungoma County within Kenya

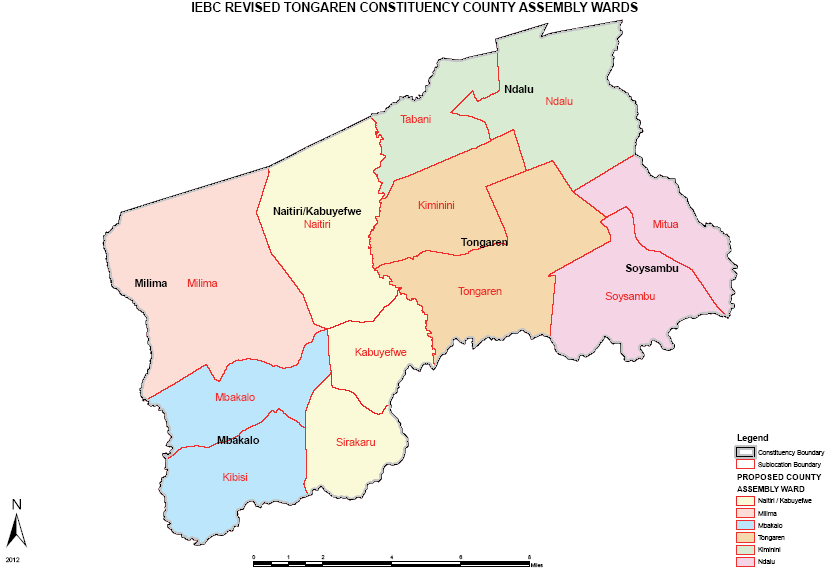
- Wards of Tongaren Constituency
- County: Bungoma
- Population: 100,343
- Area: 185 km^{2} (71.4 sq mi)

Current constituency
- Number of members: 1
- Party: FORD Kenya
- Member of Parliament: [[John Chikati Murumba[9]]]
- Wards: 6

Tongaren is an electoral constituency in Kenya. Tongaren constituency politically came into existence in 2012 prior to the 2013 general election. The constituency was carved off from the then larger Kimilili Constituency. It is one of the 290 constituencies in Kenya and one of the 9 constituencies in Bungoma County. The Independent Electoral and Boundaries Commission (IEBC) registered 84,952 voters in Tongaren constituency for the August 9th 2022 general election in Kenya.

== Members of National Assembly ==
Election Year	Member of Parliament	Political Party	Members of County Assembly
2007	David Eseli Simiyu	FORD-Kenya	5
2013	David Eseli Simiyu	FORD-Kenya	
2017	David Eseli Simiyu	FORD-Kenya	4
2022	John Murumba Chikati	FORD-Kenya	4

== County Assembly Wards ==
Code	Name	Population (approx)	Area (km²)
1115	Mbakalo Ward	32,229	50.20
1116	Naitiri/Kabuyefwe Ward	38,023	42.10
1117	Milima Ward	33,352	64.60
1118	Ndalu Ward	21,148	58.90
1119	Tongaren Ward	33,907	74.10
1120	Soysambu/Mitua Ward	28,819	53.10
