= Jack Wamboka =

Kenyan politician

The Honourable Jack Wamboka

Member of the Kenyan Parliament for Bumula
- Incumbent
- Assumed office 2022
- Preceded by: Mwambu Mabonga
- Constituency: Bumula

Personal details
- Born: Nelson Jack Wanami Wamboka
- Citizenship: Kenya
- Party: Democratic Action Party (Kenya)
- Spouse: Christine Nyambura
- Education: University of Nairobi
- Awards: Honorary Warden-KWS

Nelson Jack Wanami Wamboka (born 17 November) is a Kenyan politician who is serving as the Bumula member of parliament since the 2022 general elections. He was elected under the Democratic Action Party (Kenya) ticket. He was the chairman of the Public Investment Committee on Governance and Education.

== Early life and education ==
Wamboka pursued his Kenya Certificate for Secondary Education from St Mary's Kibabii High School in Bungoma County from 1995 to 1998. He was at the University of Nairobi from 2012, graduating with a degree in 2022.

== Career ==
Wamboka was the acting director of the Kenya Wildlife Service and also a representative principal secretary of the Ministry of Devolution from 2021 to 2022.

=== Political career ===
Wamboka was elected as the representative in parliament for Bumula Constituency on August 2022 on a party ticket for Democratic Action Party (Kenya). He was the chairperson of the Public Investment Committee on Governance and Education till 2026 when he was replaced by the Luanda Member of Parliament, Dick Maungu.

== Controversies ==
On April 22, 2026, Wamboka was suspended from the Public Investment Committee by the deputy speaker of the National Assembly, Gladys Boss Shollei. He had chaired the committee since the beginning of the 13th parliament before his 45 day suspension pending an investigation into bribery and intimidation allegations, which he was later cleared on.

He was removed from the Public Investment Committee and reassigned to the National Cohesion and Equal Opportunity Committee by the Azimio Coalition.

== Personal life ==
He is married to Christine Nyambura.
