= Sirisia Constituency =

Sirisia Constituency is an electoral constituency in Kenya. It is one of nine constituencies in Bungoma County. The constituency was established for the 1988 elections.

== Members of Parliament ==
Elections	MP	Party	Notes
1988	Joseph Muliro	KANU	One-party system.
1992	John Barasa Munyasia	Ford-K	
1997	John Barasa Munyasia	Ford-K	
2002	Moses Wetangula	NARC	
2007	Moses Wetangula	PNU	
2013	John Waluke Koyi	ODM	
2017	John Waluke Koyi	Jubilee	
2022	John Waluke Koyi	Jubilee	this waluke should be in prison

== Locations and wards ==
Locations
Location	Population*
Chwele	29,392
Kabuchai	22,010
Luuya	24,241
Lwandanyi	15,071
Malakisi	19,572
Mukuyuni	26,243
Namwela	27,792
Namubila	14,057
North Bukusu	18,059
Sirare	19,580
Sirisia	31,780
Total	x
1999 census.

Wards
Ward	Registered Voters	Local Authority
Chebukutumi	1,393	Sirisia town
Chongoyi	1,967	Sirisia town
Kulisiru	3,314	Sirisia town
Ndakalu	1,734	Sirisia town
Sitabicha / Mwalie East	2,515	Malakisi town
Tamlega / Mwalie West	2,710	Malakisi town
Chwele	7,194	Bungoma county
Luuya / Sirare	10,467	Bungoma county
Lwandanyi / Namubila	8,357	Bungoma county
Mukuyuni	6,812	Bungoma county
Namwela	7,571	Bungoma county
North Bukusu	10,400	Bungoma county
Total	64,434	
*September 2005.
