= Western Province (Kenya) =

Province of Kenya

Western Region Mkoa wa Magharibi
- Former Province
- Location in Kenya.
- Coordinates: 0°30′N 34°35′E
- Country: Kenya
- Capital: Kakamega

Area
  - Total: 7,400.4 km^{2} (2,857.3 sq mi)

Population (2009)
  - Total: 4,334,202
  - Density: 585.67/km^{2} (1,516.9/sq mi)
- Time zone: UTC+3 (EAT)

The capital of Kenya's Western Region was Kakamega (click to enlarge map)

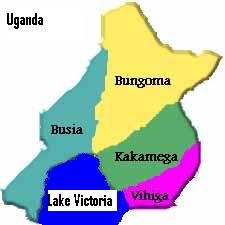
The four traditional districts of Western Province, Kenya.

Western Province (Swahili: Magharibi) was one of Kenya's seven administrative provinces outside Nairobi. It is inhabited mainly by the Luhya people. Quakerism is widely practised here. Kenya's second highest mountain, Mount Elgon is located in Bungoma District. The Kakamega Forest rainforest is part of the area. The province capital was Kakamega. After the 2013 general election, and the coming into effect of Kenya's new constitution, provinces became defunct and the country is currently divided into 47 counties. Each county has its own government and therefore there is no central regional capital. Western Province became the Western region, comprising four counties: Kakamega, Bungoma, Vihiga, and Busia.

Kakamega is the seat of government for Kakamega County, Bungoma County has its seat in Bungoma town, Busia County has the Assembly in Busia, Vihiga County in Vihiga Town. All the County governments and governors are answerable to the people not to the national government.

== Geography ==
Western Region has diverse physical features, from the hills of northern Bungoma County to the plains bordering Lake Victoria in Busia County. The highest point in the Western Region of Kenya is the peak of Mount Elgon, while the lowest point is the town of Busia on the water at Lake Victoria. In 1999 the total population was of 3,358,776 inhabitants within an area of 8,361 km², increasing to 4.334 million for the 2009 decennial census.

== Climate ==
The climate is mainly tropical, with variations due to altitude. Kakamega County is mainly hot and wet most of the year, while Bungoma County is colder but just as wet. Busia County is the warmest, while the hilly Vihiga County is the coldest. The entire province experiences very heavy rainfall all year round, with the long rains in the earlier months of the year.

== Economy ==
Farming is the main economic activity in the province.

Bungoma County is sugar country, with one of the country's largest sugar factories, as well as numerous small-holder sugar mills. Maize is also grown for subsistence, alongside pearl millet and sorghum. Dairy farming is widely practised, as well as the raising of poultry. There is a small but important tourist circuit, centering on the biennial circumcision ceremonies.

Kakamega County has a mixture of both subsistence and cash crop farming, with sugar cane being the preferred medium to large scale crop. The County has two sugar factories. There is also a significant tourism industry centering on Kakamega Forest.

Busia County experiences perennial floods from the Nzoia River, and the dominant economic activity is fishing on Lake Victoria. Limited commercial farming is also practiced, mainly of sugar cane. Subsistence farming of cassava is widely practiced.

Vihiga County has large tea plantations, and is the most densely populated rural area in Kenya. Quarrying for construction materials is a significant activity in the hilly County. Dairy farming is also widely practiced in Vihiga.

Western Kenya has many large factories, including sugar processing plants (4 factories). The largest of these is Mumias Sugar, based at Mumias, to the west of Kakamega. This factory produces the dominant sugar brand in Kenya and is an economic success story. Also in Western Kenya is the largest paper factory in Africa (Pan Paper Mills in Webuye) and chemical processors. Despite this, living standards are generally low and social amenities like running water and electricity are not available to the majority of the province's residents.

== Counties ==
Code	County	Former Province	Area (km^{2})	Population Census 2009	Capital
37	Kakamega	Western	3,033.8	1,660,651	Kakamega
38	Vihiga	Western	531.3	554,622	Vihiga
39	Bungoma	Western	2,206.9	1,375,063	Bungoma
40	Busia	Western	1,628.4	743,946	Busia
	Totals		7,400.4	4,334,202	-

=== Districts after 2007 ===
Several new districts were created in 2007 in Kenya, also in Western Province:

District	Capital
Bumula	
Bungoma Central	Chwele
Bungoma East (Webuye)	Webuye
Bungoma North	Kimilili
Bungoma South	Bungoma
Bungoma West (Sirisia)	Sirisia
Bunyala	Budalangi
Busia	Busia
Butere	Butere
Emuhaya	Kima
Hamisi	Hamisi
Kakamega Central (Lurambi)	
Kakamega East (Shinyalu)	
Kakamega North (Malava)	Malava
Kakamega South (Ikolomani)	Kakamega
Khwisero	Khwisero
Likuyani	Likuyani
Lugari	Lumakanda
Matete	Matete (Kenya)
Matungu	Matungu
Mount Elgon	Kapsokwony
Mumias	Mumias
Sabatia	Sabatia
Samia	Funyala
Siaya	Siaya
Teso North	Amagoro
Teso South	Amukura
Vihiga	Mbale

== Notable residents ==
- Khadambi Asalache, poet
- Simon Kachapin, 1st and 3rd Governor of West Pokot County
- Thomas Longosiwa (born 1982), Olympic runner
- Tegla Loroupe, world record holder for 20, 25, and 30 kilometres running
- Augustine Lotodo, politician
- Francis Polisi Loile Lotodo, politician
- Lonah Chemtai Salpeter (born 1988), Kenyan-born Israeli Olympic marathon runner

== See also ==
- Aisere
- Konjero se Ekonjero
- Lwanda
