= Mashuru =

- Location within Kenya
- Coordinates: 2.1°S 37.13°E
- Country: Kenya
- County: Kajiado County
- Time zone: UTC+3 (EAT)

Mashuru is a division in Kenya's Kajiado County in the former Rift Valley Province. It is inhabited by the Maasai people. The most populated settlement in the district is also named Mashuru, but is often called "Mashuru town" — similarly to many other districts and counties in Kenya named after the most populous town or vice versa.
