= Ndakalu =

- Location within Kenya
- Coordinates: 0.73°N 34.45°E
- Country: Kenya
- County: Bungoma County
- Time zone: UTC+3 (EAT)

Ndakalu is a settlement in Kenya's Bungoma County.
