= Konjero se Ekonjero =

- Location within Kenya
- Coordinates: 0°N 34.63°E
- Country: Kenya
- County: Vihiga County
- Time zone: UTC+3 (EAT)

Konjero se Ekonjero is a settlement in Kenya's Western Province.
