= Maurice S. Makhanu =

Kenyan politician and civil servant

Maurice S. Makhanu started his career in 1980 as an assistant secretary to the office of the President of Kenya, he later served as a District Commissioner in Kisumu and Kisii before becoming the member of parliament for Kanduyi Constituency from 1988 to 1992. In 1994, he was elected to be the Provincial commissioner of North Eastern Province where he retired to his home in Bumula District after being awarded Elder of the Burning Spear (E.B.S) from the then President of Kenya, Daniel arap Moi. He now participates in the growth of his home town Bungoma County and also joins the council of Bukusu (clan) elders in making key decisions for the county.
