= Lwanda =

- Location within Kenya
- Coordinates: 0.03°N 34.58°E
- Country: Kenya
- Province: Western Province
- Time zone: UTC+3 (EAT)

Lwanda is a settlement in Kenya's Western Province. It is a town comprising majorly the tribes of Abanyore and the Maragoli. The town's name was majorly influenced by the presence of many rocks and boulders in the area.
