= Kimaeti =

- Location within Kenya
- Coordinates: 0.6°N 34.41°E
- Country: Kenya
- County: Bungoma County
- Time zone: UTC+3 (EAT)
- Climate: Am

Kimaeti is a settlement in Kenya's Bungoma County. It is in Bungoma county, located along the Bungoma Malaba road just a few minutes drive from Bungoma town center.

To the north and south of Kimaeti is Malakisi and Myanga markets respectively. It is a popular area with its huge animal market and religious movements. Every year there is a quran completion held at kimaeti mosque for the whole of Kenya. There are also some small churches in the area.
