= Nyeri High School =

Boys boarding school in Nyeri, Kenya

Coordinates: 0°24′29″S 36°55′14″E

Nyeri High School, also known as Nyeri High, is a boys' boarding school situated in Nyeri, Kenya near Mathari Consolata Mission Hospital, which provides secondary education as stipulated by the 8-4-4 Curriculum. Despite being acknowledged as an academic giant in the region, the school has also gained notoriety for student unrest, culminating in the deaths of four school prefects in a fire caused by student arson and was followed a few years later by a student strike that led to an official government inquiry into the school's management.

In 2006, Nyeri High School was ranked the 22nd best high school in Kenya based on Kenya Certificate of Secondary Education results.

== History ==
The present Nyeri High school was founded in 1907 as a primary school, along with the neighbouring St. Paul Seminary and the Mathari Mission Hospital, by the Consolata Missionary Sisters on a parcel of land acquired from a local chief a few years earlier. In the 1930s, the school began offering K.A.P.E. certificates and by the time Kenya gained its political independence in 1963, it had developed into a full high school offering both O-Level and A-Level certificates.

== Notable alumni ==
- Nderitu Gachagua, 1st governor of Nyeri County
- Bonaya Godana, former Member of Parliament for North Horr,
- Michael Kamau, former Minister for Roads and Transport
- Joseph Kamotho, former Member of Parliament for Mathioya and Former Minister of Education
- Julius Waweru Karangi, former head of Kenya Defence Forces (KDF)
- Mwai Kibaki, former President of the Republic of Kenya, Member of Parliament, Othaya Constituency
- Musikari Kombo, nominated Member of Parliament
- John Michuki, Minister for Environment, Republic of Kenya, Member of Parliament, Kangema Constituency
- Francis Muthaura, Former secretary to the cabinet & head of public service in Kenya
- Chris Murungaru, former Minister for Internal Security & MP for Kieni Constituency
- Benson Wairegi, former CEO of Britain Insurance Group
- Koigi wa Wamwere, former Member of parliament for Nakuru North (formerly Subukia)
