= Laboot =

- Location within Kenya
- Coordinates: 1.02°N 34.62°E
- Country: Kenya
- County: Bungoma County
- Elevation: 3,166 m (10,387 ft)

Population
  - Total: 383
- Time zone: UTC+3 (EAT)
- Climate: Cfb

Laboot is a settlement in Bungoma County, Kenya. The estimated population is 3621 as per 2019 population census (KNBS 2019), and the settlement lies at an elevation of 10,387 feet (3,166 m).

== Chepkitale ==
=== Introduction ===
The Ogiek have lived across the whole of the vast swathe of moorland covering Mt. Elgon since time immemorial. In Mt. Elgon and Tans-Nzoia Districts they have been historically and traditionally acknowledged as the established, if minority, hunter gatherer community (Ogiek), who turned pastoralists (Ogiik). Today the population in their age-old home ground numbers about 3,000 according to the 2009 population census. At the advent of colonial period the Chepkitale Ogiek were treated as a different ethnic community to any other community on or around Mt. Elgon. They were given the misnomer of the Elgonyi or Mt Elgon Masaai or the dorobo or called ndorobo. There is one comment which must be made at this time to correct a common error in thinking and usage. In 1911 the colonial government gave the Ogiek their own Native Chief, called Sangulu. Laboot being the administrative Office of the Ogiek and the site of the Chief. The Land Carter Commission of 1932 still recognised the Chepkitale Ogiek as a distinct community. The people were even awarded its own native reserve called Chepkitale Native Reserve, a name derived from the Chepkitale hill. After Kenya's independence, Chepkitale Native Reserve was again officially recognized and was renamed The Chepkitale Trust Land.

=== Origin of the problem ===
The Ogiek (also still known as the Chepkitale people or as the ndorobo) were traditionally hunter-gatherers and pastoralist. Women used to and continue to practice weaving of bamboo handicraft. Their baskets taken to lower parts of Mt Elgon where they exchange for maize.

In 1965 a plan was muted for the Ogiek to be assisted with farmlands for crop cultivation. They carried out a vote among themselves and agreed, subject to certain stringent conditions.

The first condition was that they would retain their trust land (Chepkitale). Secondly, it the agreement was conditional on the Ogiek peoples being given land situated in the parts of Ramromwet, Kiboroa and Teldet and other adjacent land in the east.

The Mount Elgon region leaders at the time, led by former M.P Hon Daniel Moss, and others went ahead with the programme and settled the Ogiek in Chepyuk. This was categorically against the wishes of the community and contrary to the second of the conditions mentioned earlier.

In 1971 first settlement started. However, before this initial phase had proceeded far, discontent had already begun. The Pok Peoples had taken half the land, despite this community already having extensive coffee plantations covering all of their own traditional lands.

The result of this, an occurrence not anticipated or even discussed during the original discussions which led to the agreement of some Ogiek elders to become settled agriculturalists, was that the community which was the very reason for the whole enterprise, the Ogiek, failed to get the necessary allocation of land.

Discontent among the Ogiek was inevitable. There would have been no allocation of land whatsoever, and no resettlement scheme, if the administration had not wanted the Ogiek to become settled farmers. Now much of the land on which they were to be settled was awarded to a community which was not even party to the earlier discussions or agreements.

This discontent continued unabated until 1989 when the government came intervened. The government attempted to correct the messy situation which had developed. The Provincial Commissioner Western Province at that time, Mr Francis Lekolool, saw that the process had been inequitable. His efforts, however, were short lived because he was transferred.

The unfortunate result of Mr Lekolool's transfer was that the local District Commissioners and District Officers at that time made a serious error. They decided to commercialize the exercise. It cannot be avoided but to directly make clear that at least some of these administration officials were complicit in corruptly selling the land to other peoples who had no stake in the original agreement and already owned extensive real estate's elsewhere.

The problems multiplied. The entire exercise was marred. Both the first and second phases of what was called the Chepyuk Settlement Scheme were fatally corrupted for several reasons:

- Many people, notable several former district councillors ended up with more than four plots of land; they received double allocations.
- There were, and continue to be, a large number of examples of other people having shares in a single allocations, i.e. people sharing the same plot.
- There are people who have seven plots using same name, or presenting their names in different constructs, e.g. (though a fictitious example) Felix Sikuku Jones, Sikuku Jones Felix and Jones Felix Sikuku.
- Children of school-going age were allocated land using the Identity Numbers of other people.
- The land surveyors for some reason even allocated land plots directly on the banks of rivers and streams, with the result that there has been widespread soil erosion.
- Unfortunately, the seemingly endemic Kenyan disease, corruption, was widely evidenced in both the surveying and allocation of land. It is, regrettably, unavoidable but to point accusing fingers at a wide range of so-called public servants, including: land surveyors, lands officers, former and serving local councillors, and even chiefs, district officers and some district commissioners.

With yet more land needed as a result of the flawed earlier allocations, the so-called phase three (Chepkurkrur) scheme was hatched. In this phase land was to be shared on a fifty- fifty basis between the Ogieks and the Sabaots. Some of the Pok leaders were not happy with this decision and quickly organized for resistance and formed Sabaot Land Defence Forces that led to the biggest humanitarian crisis in Mt Elgon between 2004 and 2008.

The result of the SLDF's targeted killings and plunder, is the displacement of over 100,000 people, over 1000 deaths, and uncounted injured and traumatized children, women and men.

These are some of the ways in which the Ogiek suffered:

Habitat/ housing

The Universal Declaration of Human Rights article 25(1) states that “everyone has a right to a standard of living adequate for the health and well-being of himself/herself and of his/her family, including food clothing housing and medical.” Part 25(2) of the Declaration says that “motherhood and childhood are entitled to special care and assistance.” 90 per cent of the houses in Emia and Chepyuk locations, where Ogieks were burnt. “The right of tenure over one's home is very important because it is a precondition to everything else,” observed Executive Director UN-Habitat, Anna Tibaijuka. A conservative estimate of the number of houses (semi- permanent and permanent) destroyed puts the number at 15,000 houses, together with all their contents. The cost in money terms is put by observers as over 160 million KSh. A way of life and the sense of security of tens of thousands of people utterly destroyed.

Food and clothing

The food harvested in Chepyuk was either burned or looted by the militia group. Clothing was burned and bedding destroyed. Countless tons of food produce has lost. This is all contrary to The Universal Declaration of Human Rights article 26(1). The monetary value of the food lost as a result of looting and burning is independently estimated as exceeding 500 million KSh.

Loss of life

The Kenyan constitution sections 71 states that “no person shall be deprived of his life intentionally.” Lives in Mt Elgon were lost, and those who killed acted without respect for age or gender. It is inevitable that disinterested observers view the work of the SLDF as tantamount to ethnic cleansing, or cultural genocide.

Even after tackling the land issue there is need to set up a commission to look into the killings and for those behind the killings, and not just the killers themselves, to be dealt with according to the law.

Education

Article 26(1) of The Universal Declaration of Human Rights states that, “every one has the right of education”. The schools that the Ogiek children were attending at Laboot, Kipkama, Toboo at Chepkitale were left to rot by the Sabaot leadership. When the war started the Pok Children went to cheptais where there are schools while the Ogiek children had no school to attend at Chepkitale.

The community had made request to the government to have schools in Chepkitale, but all has been vain. UNICEF, CDF officials, a schools inspector and several potential donor/supporters wanted and are willing to assist. Materials for construction of temporary classrooms were even brought to the district. However, administration officials on the advice of former MP Mr Serut and the current MP have continually barred these operations. The community had proposed and continue to reiterate the proposal that temporary schools be erected in Tomoi, Kapchepkedta, Laboot and Toboo.

Security

Provision of security is the fundamental function of any government. Article 12 of The Universal Declaration of Human Rights states that “everyone has the right to the protection of the law against such interference or attacks.”

The Ogiek suffered several attacks, among the worst was in October 1996 in Toboo area of Chepkitale where four people were killed, three injured and 1000 head of cattle, 5000 sheep and 200 donkeys taken by raiders. The armed raiders were erroneously believed to be Uganda soldiers. However, information garnered later confirmed that this had been an organized attack instigated and operated by members of the Cheptais Pok community. At the time, the Ogiek leaders informed the government that if it did not investigate and initiate ways to protect the Ogiek community, there was a real danger of a determined campaign of ethnic cleansing being undertaken against it and the use of the label “genocide” was inevitable.

We wonder why the Government failed but we presume the following reasons:

- The security issue was politicized – as continues to be the case – largely because virtually all Mt Elgon politicians are of Pok origin.
- Certain elements of the in-situ security apparatus seemed to have been unable to work closely with National Security Intelligence Service.
- There was a glaring lack of honesty and transparency on the part of certain government officials and politicians.
- There was poor co-ordination within the government, a lack of joined-up-thinking, especially at the district level, but also even from the national perspective.
- The militia question became a homegrown issue in Cheptais and few, if any, felt able or were prepared to provide information which would assist in undermining the SLDF
- There was overt and covert support for the militia from many politicians and aspiring politicians, and even amidst members of the public services.

The following recommendations will create lasting peace in the region.

- There shall be a nullification of the gazettement of Chepkitale as a national game reserve and this area should revert to its original status of a Trust Land
- The Ogiek people's rights to settle at their ancestral lands at Chepkitale should be protected.
- There should be primary schools provided at Laboot, Toboo, Tomoi and Kapchepkelda areas of Chepkitale
- Chepkitale should have a proper administrative infrastructure. The area should be made into a division, with three locations and a commensurate number of civic wards.
- There should be a restoration of the original boundaries of Ogiek Peoples land of Chepkitale as it was delineated in the agreement of 1911.
- Health facilities should be built at Laboot.
- Security at Chepkitale should be enhanced by the setting up of a Kenya Police post, of administrative police posts, and the establishment of a General Service Unit camp at Laboot.
