= Bumula Constituency =

Electoral constituency in Busia County, Kenya

Bumula
- constituency for the Parliament of Kenya
- Bumula Constituency within Bungoma County

- Bungoma County within Kenya
- County: Bungoma
- Population: 215,892
- Area: 345 km^{2} (133.2 sq mi)

Current constituency
- Number of members: 1
- Party: DAP K
- Member of Parliament: Jack Wamboka
- Wards: 7

Bumula Constituency is an electoral constituency in Kenya. It is one of nine constituencies in Bungoma County. The constituency was established for the 1997 elections.

== Members of Parliament ==
Elections	MP	Party	Notes
1997	Lawrence Simiyu Sifuna	Ford-K	
2002	Sylvester Wakoli Bifwoli	Ford-K	
2007	Sylvester Wakoli Bifwoli	Ford-K	
2013	Ford Kenya		
2017	Mwambu Mabonga	IND	
2022	Nelson Jack Wamboka	DAP-K	

== Wards ==
Wards
Ward	Registered Voters	Local Authority
Mukwa	3,688	Malakisi town
Siboti	4,015	Malakisi town
Bumula	11,518	Bungoma County
Kimaeti	8,944	Bungoma County
Musikoma	1,528	Bungoma County
Namasanda	3,665	Bungoma County
Sio	1,669	Bungoma County
Siritanyi	1,968	Bungoma County
South Bukusu	10,827	Bungoma County
West Bukusu	4,606	Bungoma County
Total	52,428	
*September 2005.
