= Kiminini Constituency =

Kiminini
- constituency for the Parliament of Kenya
- Kiminini Constituency within Trans Nzoia County

- Trans-Nzoia County within Kenya
- County: Trans-Nzoia
- Population: 242,823
- Area: 367 km^{2} (141.7 sq mi)

Current constituency
- Number of members: 1
- Party: DAP K
- Member of Parliament: Maurice Kakai Bisau
- Wards: 6

Kiminini is a constituency in Kenya. It is one of five constituencies in Trans-Nzoia County.

== Members of Parliament ==
Elections	MP	Party	Notes
2013	Dr Chrisanthus Wakhungu Wamalwa	Ford Kenya	
2017	Dr Chrisanthus Wakhungu Wamalwa	Ford Kenya	
2022	Maurice Kakai Bisau	DAP–K	
