= Kabuchai Constituency =

Kabuchai
- constituency
- Country: Kenya
- County: Bungoma County

Kabuchai is one of the electoral constituency in Kenya's Bungoma County, in the Western region of the country. It has five county assembly wards namely- Kabuchai/Chwele, West Nalondo, Bwake/Luuya, Mukuyuni and South Bukusu.

== Members Of Parliament ==
Election	Member Of parliament	Party	Notes
2017	James Lusweti Mukwe	FORD KENYA	
2022	Majimbo Kalasinga	FORD KENYA	
