= Luanda Constituency =

Electoral constituency in Kenya

Luanda
- constituency for the Parliament of Kenya
- Luanda Constituency within Vihiga County

- Vihiga County within Kenya
- County: Vihiga
- Population: 106,694
- Area: 84 km^{2} (32.4 sq mi)

Current constituency
- Number of members: 1
- Party: DAP K
- Member of Parliament: Dick Maungu
- Wards: 5

Luanda is a constituency in Kenya. It is one of five constituencies in Vihiga County and was established in 2013 The current MP is Dick Maungu Oyugi of Democratic Action Party Kenya - (DAP-K) for 2022-2027 period. It had a population of 106,694 people according to the 2019 census.
