= Sabaot Land Defence Force =

Kenyan militant group

- Leader: Wycliffe Matwakei Komon
- Dates active: 2005 - 2008
- Country: Kenya
- Active regions: Mount Elgon District
- Size: 3,000 (estimated)

The Sabaot Land Defence Force (SLDF) was a guerrilla militia operating in the Mount Elgon District of Kenya since 2005. It has been accused of killing more than 600 people, and of committing a variety of atrocities including murder, torture, rape, and the theft and destruction of property. More than 66,000 people had been displaced in an 18-month period.

== Overview ==
The group drew its members from the Sabaot people, who are a sub-tribe of the Kalenjin, an ethnic group which forms less than 11% of the Kenyan population, but a much larger percentage in the Rift Valley Province and eastern Uganda. They were allegedly led by a former bodyguard to the President, who was killed by security forces. Wycliffe Matakwei Kirui Komon was the deputy commander and assumed leadership of the militia at its peak; he claimed to command 35,000 soldiers and scouts. Unusual for groups in the area, they wore jungle camouflage uniforms and had access to ammunition – although AK47s and other guns are easily accessible from bordering nations such as Somalia, costing around $130 while ammunition is more difficult to acquire. The SLDF was funded by unofficial "taxation" of the local residents, and had implemented a parallel administration system.

Commentators attributed the outbreaks of violence and rise of the militias to several factors: conflict over scarce land resources, widespread unemployment among young men, and a fast-growing population (50% of the Kenyan population is aged below 16). In local tradition it had been considered good for a man to have as many children as possible, and international aid agencies which receive any portion of funding from the US federal government have been prohibited from providing advice on family planning. This has resulted in a fast-growing population which is stressing agricultural resources. Tensions between different ethnic groups were also manifested in the 2007–2008 Kenyan crisis.

== Structure ==
ISS described the group as having "a clear organizational structure and chain of command" with a political and spiritual wing along with the main military arm. The overall leader of the group was Wycliffe Matakwei with the second in command being David Sichei. The group's leader claimed to have 35,000 men under his command but Western Kenya Human Rights watch estimated 3,000 fighters with 30 cells of approximately 100 men each. Majority of the SLDF lived alongside civilians when not engaged in combat except the militia's leadership, trainers and specialized fighters who were permanently based in forests near the border with Uganda.

The group had access to a variety of weapons uncommon for criminal groups in Kenya including machine guns, hand grenades and rocket-propelled grenades along with the usual AK-47s and G3 rifles. Notably the group also had access to jungle combat fatigues commonly seen with the Kenya Police and this along with the weapons led to reports that civilians had difficulty in distinguishing militia fighters from police in the area. The group was considered well trained due to a number of former police and military officers having been linked in secretly training SLDF fighters in the Mount Elgon forests. Indeed, the second in command, David Sichei was a former police officer and the level of coordination and language used in attacks alluded to some formal training by former security services personnel.

Between 2006 and 2008 the SLDF virtually controlled Mount Elgon region and had established its administration with informal courts and taxation for residents. Taxation was particularly harshly enforced on civil servants with severe repercussions for those who failed to pay levies.

== Government response ==
The government initially treated the SLDF as common criminals, but begun to treat them as an organised militia. An amnesty offered the equivalent of $265 to fighters surrendering their weapons, but no weapons were surrendered. Security forces found it difficult to gain information on the group, due to intimidation and the threat of violence towards the families of those who might come forward with information.

A large scale military assault in March 2008 resulted in allegations of serious human rights abuses by the Kenya Army, including murder, torture, rape, and arbitrary detention. By July 2008 fighting had substantially declined with the SLDF having been virtually destroyed in a number of offensive operations particularly around the Chebyuk area with relative peace prevailing.

Wycliffe Matwakei Komol, the leader of SLDF was killed by the Kenyan army on 16 May 2008.

== See also ==
- The Mungiki: a Kikuyu-affiliated - criminal militia group operating in urban areas of Kenya.
- Mombasa Republican Council (MRC)
