= Webuye East Constituency =

Electoral constituency in Kenya

Webuye East
- constituency for the Parliament of Kenya
- Webuye East Constituency within Bungoma County

- Bungoma County within Kenya
- County: Bungoma

Current constituency
- Number of members: 1
- Party: FORD-Kenya
- Member of Parliament: Martin Wanyonyi Pepela
- Wards: 3

Webuye East is a constituency in Kenya. It is one of nine constituencies in Bungoma County. The constituency is located in the eastern region of Bungoma County and comprises three wards: Mihuu, Ndivisi, and Maraka Wards. Webuye East was hived from the original Webuye Constituency together with Webuye West prior to the 2013 General Elections. The constituency is a mainly agricultural area with the majority of residents farming cereals and sugarcane.

The constituency is predominantly inhabited by the Tachoni sub tribe of the Luhya people.

== Members Of Parliament ==
Elections	MP	Party	Notes
Webuye East Constituency created from Webuye
2017	Bernard Alfred Wekesa Sambu	ANC	
2022	Martin Pepela Wanyonyi	FORD-K	
