= John Makali =

Kenyan politician

Member of the National Assembly for Kanduyi Constituency
- Incumbent
- Assumed office 16 August 2022
- Preceded by: Wafula Wamunyinyi

Personal details
- Party: FORD–Kenya

John Makali is a Kenyan politician from Ford-K who has been MP for Kanduyi Constituency since the 2022 Kenyan general election.

== Political career ==
He defeated Wafula Wamunyinyi at the 2022 general election.

== See also ==
13th Parliament of Kenya
