= Kapsokwony =

Coordinates: 0°51′08″N 34°42′07″E

Kapsokwony is a small town in Bungoma County, Kenya. The town is part of Mount Elgon County Council and Mount Elgon Constituency.

Kapsokwony division has a population of 24,526, of whom 1,586 are classified as urban (1999 census). The urban population was 7,077 in 2019.

Kapsokwony formed one of four administrative divisions in the former Mount Elgon District.
