= Alfred Khang'ati =

Kenyan politician

Alfred Khang'ati is a Kenyan politician. He belongs to the Orange Democratic Movement and was elected to represent the Kanduyi Constituency in the National Assembly of Kenya since the 2007 Kenyan parliamentary election.
