= Chwele =

Town in Bungoma County, Kenya

- Town
- Country: Kenya
- Province: Western Kenya
- County: Bungoma County

Population (2019 census)
  - Total: 9,797

Chwele is a town in Bungoma County, Western Kenya. The town is an agricultural and marketing centre located between Kimilili and Bungoma. The market is the major meeting point for farmers from the surrounding areas of Mount Elgon, Namwela, Sirisia, Lurende, Matibo and Chebukaka especially every Monday and Friday when there is a market day (flea market). Large quantities of maize, bananas, local vegetables, sim sim as well as livestock such as chicken, goats, cattle and sheep are available for sale. The market is Kenya's second largest open air market. The urban population was 9,799 (2019 census).

The area is inhabited by the Bukusu people and there is a growing populations of Sabaots, Tesos and even Kikuyus. Schools in the area include Namwela Boys High school, Chwele Girls High School, Busakala High School, Teremi High School, Sanandiki Primary school among others. The area has a health center that caters for the local community and it has both in-patient and out-patient facilities. It nowadays boosts of a medical training institute (Chwele MTC) located at the Junction of Khachonge/Bukembe Road. The center is also home to the Chwele coffee cooperative society and the Chwele grain marketing cereals bank initiated by SACRED Africa, a local NGO operating in the area.

The area has rich black volcanic soils that are suitable for growing many crops with very good yields. The area also receives over 1600mm of rain in a year mostly between the months of March and August making it possible for twice farming of crops each year.
