= Mt. Elgon Constituency =

Electoral constituency in Kenya

Mount Elgon Constituency is an electoral constituency in Bungoma County, Western Kenya. It was formerly the only constituency in the now defunct Mount Elgon District. The constituency was established for the 1963 elections. It has a population of 218,873 people (2019 census). It is currently administered in three administrative units of Mt. Elgon Subcounty headquartered at Kapsokwony town, Cheptais Subcounty headquartered at Cheptais Township, and Kopsiro Subcounty whose headquarter is at Kopsiro Centre.

== Members of Parliament ==
Since independence, Mt. Elgon constituency electorates has elected five different Members of the National Assembly (MPs). Daniel Moss was the pioneer MP in 1963, while Fred Chesebe Kapondi is the incumbent. It is worthy also noting that Mt. Elgon is the only constituency created at independence that has never been subdivided to create more electoral area units, an issue that has disenfranchised its electorate. This was witnessed by the recent call for ELEXIT (Elgon Exit from Bungoma County), a memorandum that was received at the SENATE during the highs of BBI.

Elections	MP	Party	Notes
1963	Daniel Naibei Chepnoi Moss	KANU	
1969	Daniel Naibei Chepnoi Moss	KANU	One-party system
1974	Daniel Naibei Chepnoi Moss	KANU	One-party system
1979	Wilberforce arap Kisiero	KANU	One-party system
1983	Wilberforce arap Kisiero	KANU	One-party system.
1988	Wilberforce arap Kisiero	KANU	One-party system.
1992	Wilberforce arap Kisiero	KANU	
1997	Joseph Naibei Kimkung	KANU	
2002	John Bomet Serut	KANU	
2007	Fred Chesebe Kapondi	ODM	
2013	John Bomet Serut	IN	
2017	Fred Chesebe Kapondi	Jubilee	
2022	Fred Chesebe Kapondi	UDA	Kenya Kwanza Alliance

== Wards ==
The constituency has six wards, all electing Members of County Assembly (MCAs) for the Bungoma County Assembly.

Wards
Ward	Registered Voters	MCA	Election Year	Party	Votes
Cheptais	13,342	Martin Cheseto Chemorion	2022	UDA	3,823
Chepyuk	11,375	Frankline Simotwo Korir	2022	Ford Kenya	2,856
Chesikak	11,075	Jacob Marugaa Psero	2022	IND	3,419
Elgon	14,512	George Kwemoi Tendet	2022	IND	3,125
Kapkateny	12,141	Joan Chemayiek Kirong	2022	UDA	3,566
Kaptama	13,714	Francis Chemion Masai	2022	UDA	4,993
Total	76,159				
*June 2022.
