= Misikhu =

Coordinates: 0°43′08″N 34°45′18″E

Misikhu is a rural town near the Kakamega-Kitale highway situated on the southern slopes of Mt Elgon, in Bungoma County, Kenya. Located ten kilometres north of Webuye town and towards Kitale, Misikhu serves as both an administrative and commercial hub.

== Population ==
Misikhu's population is unknown and primarily inhabited by the Tachoni and Bukusu tribes, although several other Luhya clans also border Misikhu. The predominant dialects spoken are Olutachoni, Lubukusu, and Swahili. There are also traces of immigrants, including Kikuyu, Luo, Kisii, and Kamba.

== Services ==
The area is locally known for its schools, including St. Cecilia Misikhu Girls' School, Misikhu R.C Boys, Friends School Magemo, and St. Francis Secondary School, Makemo.

Misikhu market is located between two constituencies: Webuye West and Webuye East, to the north of Webuye town along the Kakamega-Kitale highway. It is strategically positioned in the Webuye West constituency under the representation of Member of Parliament Dan Wanyama and within the Misikhu ward led by Member of County Assembly Millia Masungo.

The town is gradually developing, with farming being the main economic activity. The local farmers primarily grow maize, which serves as a staple food in Misikhu. Additionally, sugarcane is cultivated as a major cash crop. Trading activities are also significant, with Sunday being an open -air m

In terms of religion, Misikhu is diverse, with the majority of residents belonging to the Quaker denomination due to the influence of Quaker missionaries in the Lugulu mission area. Other denominations present include the Anglican Church of Kenya (ACK), represented by Sirende ACK; the Salvation Army; Divine African Churches; Pentecostal churches; and others. Friends Churches in the area include Bunang'eni and Misikhu Friends churches.

Culturally, Misikhu ward is rich in traditional practices, including initiation ceremonies, unique burial rites, and various cultural events.

Regarding leadership, Misikhu ward was previously represented by Mr. Mwembe as the Member of County Assembly from 2013 to 2017, and is currently represented by Millia Masungo from 2017 to the present. Other aspiring leaders include Dr. Leviticus Wamalwa, who is campaigning to become the next Member of County Assembly for Misikhu ward.
