= Malakisi =

- Location within Kenya
- Coordinates: 0.68°N 34.42°E
- Country: Kenya
- County: Bungoma County

Population
  - Total: Malakisi has an increasing population of about 10,000+ people
- Time zone: UTC+3 (EAT)

Malakisi or Malikisi is a settlement in Kenya's Bungoma County. According to the 2009 Kenya Population and Housing Census, the total population was 41,784.

Malakisi means a place of Gold from the local communities in the area.

== History ==
Malakisi was established around 1848 as an industrial hub, with cotton serving as it's primary export to East Africa through the mid-20th century. It was also part of the Chepkube coffee-smuggling enterprise in the 1970s along Kenya's border with Uganda.

Elijah Masinde used Malakisi as a base from which to launch a campaign in 1948 against British colonial rule.

In the 1990's, Malakisi had a cotton ginnery, which was mismanaged and closed. Currently British American Tobacco Kenya is the only company that employs people in Malakisi. In 2026 the bridge that links Malakisi to Sango market in Kimaeti Subcounty was completed. A bitumen standard road has also been constructed on either side of Malakisi bridge passing through the town.
