= Kimilili Constituency =

Electoral constituency in Kenya

Kimilili Constituency is an electoral constituency in Kenya. It is one of nine constituencies in Bungoma County. The constituency was established for the 1988 elections. It is currently represented in parliament by Hon. Didmus Wekesa Barasa, MP. The Official Constituency website is https://kimililiconstituency.go.ke/, a platform that offers constituents services and information online.

== Members of Parliament ==
Elections	MP for Multiparty Democracy	Party	Notes
1988	Elijah Wasike Mwangale	KANU	One-party system.
1992	Mukhisa Kituyi	Ford-K	
1997	Mukhisa Kituyi	Ford-K	
2002	Mukhisa Kituyi	NARC	
2007	David Eseli Simiyu	Ford-K	
2012	David Eseli Simiyu	Ford-K	
2015	Suleiman Murunga	Ford-K	
2017	Didmus Barasa	Jubilee Party	
2022	Didmus Barasa	UDA	

== Wards ==
Wards
Ward	Registered Voters	Local Authority
Kibingei	8,183	Kimilili town
Kimilili township	4,483	Kimilili town
Kimilili rural	5,201	Kimilili town
Maeni	6,127	Kimilili town
Kamukuywa	7,786	Bungoma county
*September 2005.
