= Kibabii University =

Public university in Bungoma County, Kenya

- Other name: KIBU
- Former name: Kibabii University College
- Motto: Knowledge for Development
- Type: Public
- Established: 2010
- Chancellor: President Uhuru Kenyatta
- Vice-Chancellor: Prof. Isaac Ipara Odeo
- Students: 11,715
- Location: Bungoma, Bungoma County, Kenya
- Campus: Main Campus Bungoma
- Colors: Blue, white and gold
- Website: kibu.ac.ke

Kibabii University is a public university in Kenya located in Bungoma County along Bungoma-Chwele highway approximately 8km from Bungoma Town centre. Previously a constituent college of Masinde Muliro University of Science and Technology, the university was granted its Charter by President Kenyatta in November 2015. It offers, among other programs, the Bachelor of Commerce.

The Vice Chancellor of Kibabii University is Prof. Isaac Ipara Odeo.

== History ==
The origins of Kibabii University (KIBU) can be traced back to the initial establishment of Kibabii Teachers’ Training College, which eventually evolved into the present-day university. The concept of a teacher training college in Kibabii dates back to the pre-independence era, first envisioned by the Mill Hill Fathers in 1932. Initially, the college operated at St. Mary’s Kibabii High School, training P4 students until 1942 and P3 students from 1958 to 1961, after which it relocated to Eregi (Eregi Teacher Training College) in 1962.

In 1978, the local community revived the idea of establishing a teachers' college in Kibabii. Subsequently, the Government embraced the proposal, leading to the Ministry of Education's initiation of the Kibabii Primary Teachers Training College construction project under the African Development Bank's Kenya Education II project. Despite initial progress, funding challenges arose when the African Development Bank ceased financing the project.

In 2007, a significant development occurred when President Mwai Kibaki presided over a groundbreaking ceremony at the proposed site, marking the rejuvenation of the project. Initially accommodated in facilities leased from the Ministry of Gender and Social Services in Tuuti, construction commenced amidst challenges, including temporary learning spaces provided by UNICEF due to limited infrastructure. Construction efforts, led by MILICON’S LTD and subcontractors, aimed to ensure the college's full operational readiness by May 25, 2011, employing around 700 workers and stimulating local employment.

Responding to requests from Bungoma County leaders, President Kibaki officially converted the newly constructed Kibabii Diploma Teachers’ College into Kibabii University College. This transformation was formalized through Kenya Gazette Notice No. 115 of August 2011, establishing Kibabii University College as a constituent college of Masinde Muliro University of Science and Technology.

== Academics ==
Kibabii University offers academic programmes at the undergraduate and graduate levels through three schools and two faculties.

The schools and faculties are:

- School of Graduate Studies;
- School of Computing and Informatics (SCAI);
- School of Business & Economics (SOBE);
- Faculty of Arts & Social Sciences (FESS);
- Faculty of Science (FS);
