= David Eseli Simiyu =

Kenyan politician

David Eseli Simiyu is a Kenyan politician. He belongs to FORD-Kenya and was elected to represent the Kimilili Constituency in the National Assembly of Kenya since the 2007 Kenyan parliamentary election.
