= Mount Elgon District =

Former administrative district in Kenya

Coordinates: 0°51′N 34°43′E

Mount Elgon District (Mt. Elgon District) was an administrative district in the Western Province of Kenya. Its capital town was Kapsokwony. In 2010, it was merged into Bungoma County.

== Geography and demographics ==
The district was located on southeastern slopes of Mount Elgon. The district had a population of 135,033 (1999 census) and an area of 944 km^{2}.

Although Kapsokwony was the headquarters of the district, Cheptais was probably the economic heart of the district, as it contributed a great deal to the economy of the district.

Mt. Elgon is predominantly occupied by the Sabaots, Iteso and Bukusu communities.

== Government ==
The district had only one local authority: Mount Elgon county council.

Administrative divisions
Division	Population*	Urban pop.*	Headquarters
Cheptais	40,069	3,426	Cheptais
Kapsokwony	24,526	1,586	Kapsokwony
Kaptama	23,885	0	
Kopsiro	45,964	0	
Total	135,033	5,012	-
* 1999 census.

== Parliamentary representation ==
The district had one constituency: Mt. Elgon Constituency.

== Land dispute ==
In the 1970s, some 600 Mosop families who lived in the forests around Mount Elgon were resettled in Chebyuk to make way for a game reserve. They were soon joined by the Soy people; in the land allocations which followed the resettlement, the Mosop were given some 65 percent of the land, while the Soy were given the remaining 35 percent. Over the decades, other ethnicities moved into the Chebyuk settlement, which complicated the land situation.

A violent conflict began in December 2006 in the district between the Soy and Mosop subethnicities of the Sabaot ethnic group over allegations of unfair land allocation. The Sabaot Land Defense Force was formed, which led to a number of killings in the region. As of late 2007, some 150 people had died in the conflict, while over 45,000 people have been displaced from their homes in the Mount Elgon region to other towns such as Kitale, Chepkitale and Kimilili. (see Mount Elgon insurgency)
