= Democratic Action Party (Kenya) =

Political party in Kenya

Democratic Action Party-Kenya (DAP-K)
- Abbreviation: DAP
- Leader: Eugene Wamalwa
- Headquarters: Nairobi, Kenya
- National affiliation: Azimio la Umoja
- Colors: Blue
- National Assembly: 5 / 349
- Senate: 0 / 67

The Democratic Action Party of DAP-K is a political party in Kenya led by Eugene Wamalwa.

== History ==
The party was one of 23 that contested the 2022 Kenyan general election as part of the Azimio La Umoja alliance. They had 61 candidates but only 5 were elected to the 13th Parliament of Kenya.

== Members of Parliament ==
Constituency	MP
Bumula	Jack Wamboka
Cherangany	Patrick Simiyu Barasa
Kiminini	Maurice Kakai Bisau
Luanda	Dick Maungu
Mumias East	Peter Kalerwa Salasya

== See also ==
- List of political parties in Kenya
