= Webuye =

Coordinates: 0°37′N 34°46′E

- Webuye Town
- Country: Kenya
- County: Bungoma County

Population (2019)
  - Total: 42,642

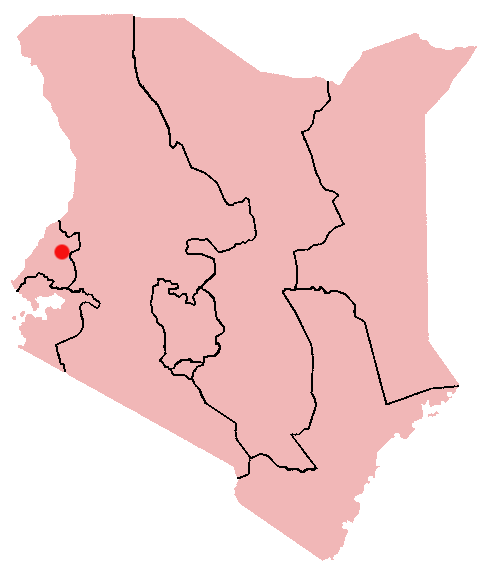
Location of Webuye in Kenya

Webuye, previously named Broderick Falls, is an industrial town in western region of Kenya and home to the Bukusu people. It is located within Webuye West sub county in Bungoma County, at the slopes of chetambe hill Kenya. Located on the main road to Uganda, the town is home to the Pan African Paper Mills, formerly the largest paper factory in the region, as well as East African heavy-chemicals plant. The area is heavily populated and is used mainly for subsistence agriculture. The town has an urban population of 42,642 (2019 census).

Areas near Webuye include Lugulu, Milo, Maraka, Furoi, Lukusi, Lutacho and Misikhu. It is home to the Nabuyole Falls of Nzoia River. In Maraka, there exists the famed "mfunje" suspension bridge which consists of rickety timber strips joined with some metal wires, precariously dangling across River Nzoia. It attracts a considerable number of both local and foreign tourists who enjoy the thrill of crossing the river on the shaky locally made bridge.

Webuye has in the recent past also seen the establishment of some important education centres, including a constituent college campus of the Masinde Muliro University of Science and Technology, and a Kenya Medical Training college Campus.

Webuye town hosts Webuye County Hospital, a leading referral medical facility in the region.

The town's economy was hit hard by the dwindling fortunes of Pan African Paper Mills, which closed down in 2008 but opened up again under a new investor thus changing its identity to Rai paper manufacturing company which has resulted to once again the liveliness of the town. Currently major malls and hotels are being constructed in the town which will bring in a new air. The nearest tourist attraction is the Nabuyole waterfalls on River Nzoia. The falls are seven kilometres from Webuye and provide a cool breeze to tourists.

== Naming ==
In the pre-independence times, Webuye was known as Broderick Falls, after the first white man to visit the nearby Nabuyole falls on River Nzoia. Today, it's named after a cobbler who repaired shoes for railway workers.

== Railways ==
The town is located on the main railway from Mombasa to Uganda. The area around the town is inhabited by both the Bukusu and the Tachoni.

== Statistics ==
- Webuye has a tropical climate, and the land around it is used mainly for subsistence agriculture. Its latitude is 0.6166667° and longitude is 34.7666667° and elevation is 1,523 metres (4,997 ft). Average annual temperature is 24 °C / 75.2 °F.
