= Kimilili =

Coordinates: 0°47′N 34°43′E

- Town
- Kimilili Town
- Country: Kenya
- County: Bungoma County

Population (2019)
  - Total: 56,050
- Website: www.bungoma.go.ke/kimilili_municipality/

Kimilili is a town and area in Kenya's Bungoma County. The area is occupied mainly by the Bukusu and a few Teso communities. It is a trading centre for agricultural goods and services. The town had a population of 56,050 as of 2019.

The surrounding region is mainly farmland with the main cash crops being coffee, maize, beans, sunflower seed sugarcane and bananas.

The main town centre has several economic activities which include retail grocery stores, supermarkets, schools and computer colleges.

There are numerous non-governmental organizations in Kimilili, the two main ones being Interchristian Fellowships' Evangelical Mission (IcFEM) and Omwabini.

Kimilili is home to the Western Provincial Police Training Centre. Due to its strength in trade and education, Kimilili's urban population is on the rise. It was home to many government workers who held office positions in the former Mt Elgon District, which was merged into Bungoma County in 2010.

== History ==
In past years, this region has suffered from land conflicts that have resulted in the displacement of thousands. The Sabaot Land Defence Force, who were the aggressors and the main agitators of this conflict, have, however, been subdued by the government. The area has raised prominent local musicians that employs local instruments in producing music. However there are a few gospel musicians like Brian Wanjala, famously known as Lemalay Lashinsky, who is among the top musicians from the contemporal societies.

== Education ==
Kimilili has one of the best schools in Kenya based on Friends School Kamusinga's consistent academic and sports excellence. Other high schools are Moi Girls High School Kamusinga, St. Luke's Boys High School, Maeni Girls Secondary School and St. Theresa's Girls Secondary School. Four primary private schools are found: PHIM Primary School, Shekinah School, Dreamland Education Centre and Farcon Academy. Public primary schools are Kimilili R.C. Boys, Kimilili R.C. Girls, Kimilili D.E.B, Kamusinga Primary, Khwiroro Primary, Bituyu, Buko and Maeni primary schools. Additionally, Matili F.Y.M Primary, Matili R.C, and Namawanga Primary School are a few schools which have produced scholars. Kimilili has a teachers' training centre (Shima TTC). Matili Technical Training Institute has impacted many local scholars from within and beyond the municipality regime with adequate skills and knowledge to be relevant to the emerging global changes.
