= Kanduyi Constituency =

Kanduyi Constituency is an electoral constituency in Kenya. It is one of nine constituencies in Bungoma County. The constituency was established for the 1988 elections. It has a general and urban population of 163, 568 and 38,407 people respectively (2019 census).

163,568	38,407

== Members of Parliament ==
Elections	MP	Party	Notes
1988	Morris S. Makhanu	KANU	One-party system.
1992	Lawrence Simiyu Sifuna	Ford-A	
1997	Athanas Wafula Wamunyinyi	Ford-K	
2002	Wafula Wamunyinyi	NARC	
2007	Alfred Khang'ati	ODM	
2013	Wafula Wamunyinyi	Ford-K	
2017	Wafula Wamunyinyi	Ford-K	
midterm	Wafula Wamunyinyi	DAP	
2022	John Makali	Ford-K	

== Wards ==
Wards
Ward	Registered Voters	Local Authority
Khalaba	3,949	Bungoma municipality
Mjini	7,098	Bungoma municipality
Sinoko	4,239	Bungoma municipality
Stadium	3,085	Bungoma municipality
Marakaru/Tuuti	7,790	Bungoma county
Bukembe west	9,878	Bungoma county
Bukembe east	9,878	Bungoma county
East Sang'alo	7,697	Bungoma county
West Sangalo	6,893	Bungoma county
Total	50,629	
*September 2005.
