= Bungoma County =

- County
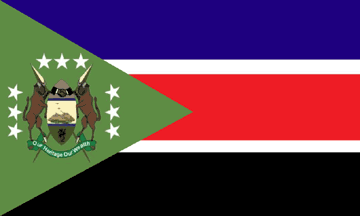
- Flag

- Location in Kenya
- Coordinates: 0.5695° N, 34.5584° E
- Country: Kenya
- Formed: 4 March 2013
- Capital: Bungoma

Government
  - Body: County Government of Bungoma
  - Governor: Kenneth Lusaka
  - Deputy Governor: Mbatiany Janepher Chemtai

Area
  - Total: 2,206.9 km^{2} (852.1 sq mi)
- Highest elevation: 4,321 m (14,177 ft)

Population (2019)
  - Total: 1,670,570
  - Rank: 4
  - Density: 756.98/km^{2} (1,960.6/sq mi)
- Time zone: UTC+3 (EAT)
- Website: www.bungoma.go.ke

Bungoma County is a county in the former Western Province of Kenya with its capital in Bungoma town. It has a population of 1,670,570 of which 812,146 are males and 858,389 are females as per the 2019 census. The county has an area of 2,069 km^{2}. It has nine constituencies, namely: Bumula, Kabuchai, Kanduyi, Kimilili, Mt. Elgon, Sirisia, Tongaren, Webuye East, and Webuye West.

The economy of Bungoma County is mainly agricultural, centering on the sugarcane and maize industries. The area experiences high rainfall throughout the year and is home to several large rivers, which are used for small-scale irrigation.

== People ==
The Bukusu people, who occupy much of the county, are resilient and flamboyant people who stood up against British rule in the late 19th century. In a war that erupted at Lumboka and eventually ended at Chetambe, near Webuye, the Bukusu bitterly resisted the British. They are farmers who practice both livestock and crop farming. An early British traveler described them as such when he visited in 1876 "on the East of the Mountain, there are the Bukusu who are greater bandu befwe navasima. The Bukusu have produced many prominent people that have served in the Kenyan public life; among them are H.E. Dr. Mukhisa Kituyi (former Secretary-General of the United Nations Conference on Trade and Development, UNCTAD), the late Hon Masinde Muliro (founder member of the original KADU independence party, founder member of FORD party) late Hon Wamalwa Kijana (former vice president), the late Cardinal Maurice Michael Otunga (head of the Catholic Church in Kenya), the late Elijah Masinde (founder of Dini ya Musambwa), Sudi Namachanja (chief during colonial times), Hon. Lawrence Sifuna (Second-Liberation hero in the struggle for multiparty democracy in Kenya), Luka Namulala (community fortune teller), Dr Eusebius Juma Mukhwana (agriculture/educationist), and Prof. Adrian Mukhebi (agriculture) among others. Among the women that have stood out include Dinah Khayota (former women's rights leader), Justice Ruth Nekoye, former Deputy Chief Justice Nancy Barasa, Beatrice Kituyi (a prominent lawyer and former Permanent Secretary in the Ministry of Labour), among others.

In business, notable figures include Makhanu Munata, Maurice Butala, Vincent Naliakho, mama Dinah Kibunguchy, Henry Wakwabubi, Tom Katenya, Mama Lutia (Nalondo), Dimina Agencies, Mwalimu Kokonya, Moses Simiyu, Luketelo, Mbaya, and Didimo Satia, among others.

Bungoma County has had prominent innovators in the NGO world that helped champion the cause for the poor in society. One such person is Jim Nduruchi, the "jigger man" who started Rise Up Society, a community welfare organization that helped free thousands of people from the jigger scourge that afflicted mainly the poor from all walks of life. He is the winner of Google Awards (2016) in the sub Saharan Africa and his movement called "Love in action" had brought together people from everywhere on the planet to team up and drum up support for the suffering rural folk in Kenya.

== Political leadership ==
Politically, over the last 17 years or so, the community have been members of Ford-Kenya, the party formerly headed by Wamalwa Kijana. Through this party, the community has been able to express and participate in national politics. More recently, community members now have MPs drawn from the Orange Democratic Movement (ODM), the Party of National Unity (Kenya) (PNU), Ford-Kenya, and New-Ford-Kenya. Currently, Kenneth Lusaka was the first Governor 2013 to 2017 followed by the county is headed by Dr Wycliffe Wafula Wangamati and deputised by Professor Charles Ngome. They took office in 2017 after Kenneth Lusaka the first Governor lost reelection second term reelection in 2017. Moses Wetangula is the seating senator since 2013 and Catherine Nanjala Wambilianga is the women representative since 2017.

== Administrative and electoral units ==
Bungoma County has 9 constituencies and 45 County Assembly wards.

=== Constituencies ===
1. Kabuchai
2. Kanduyi
3. Sirisia
4. Kimilili
5. Bumula
6. Tongaren
7. Webuye East
8. Webuye West
9. Mt. Elgon

== Population ==
The county has a population of 1,670,570 persons as per 2019 census with a density of 552 persons per square kilometre and an average household 4.6 persons. Out of the total population 812,146 persons are male, 858,389 are female, and 35 are intersex.

Sub County/Ward	Total Population(2019)
Bumula	215,892
Bungoma Central	177,748
Bungoma East	114,548
Bungoma North	121,317
Bungoma South	287,765
Cheptais	136,035
Kimilili-Bungoma	162,038
Mt. Elgon	78,873
Bungoma West	119,875
Tongaren	100,343
Webuye West	152,515
Mt. Elgon Forest*	3,621
Total (Bungoma)	1,670,570

Historical population
Year	Pop.	±%
1979	503,935	—
1989	679,146	+34.8%
1999	1,011,524	+48.9%
2009	1,375,063	+35.9%
2019	1,670,570	+21.5%

=== Religion ===
Religion in Bungoma County

Religion (2019 Census)	Number
Catholicism	291,998
Protestant	715,732
Evangelical Churches	467,570
African-initiated churches	88,179
Orthodox	4,993
Other Christian	40,682
Islam	21,687
Hindu	424
Traditionists	3,884
Other	15,342
No ReligionAtheists	11,813
Don't Know	1,474
Not Stated	120

== Economy ==
The main economic activities include agriculture, manufacturing, services, and general retail. Bungoma county had a Gross County Product of Ksh 174,240 Million in 2022. The county is part of the Lake Region Economic Bloc (LREB) established in 2018 to foster regional economic, industrial, social, and technological collaboration.

=== Agriculture ===
Agriculture is the backbone of Bungoma County and most families rely on crop production and animal rearing. The main crops include maize, beans, finger millet, sweet potatoes, bananas, Irish potatoes, and assorted vegetables. These are grown primary for subsistence, with the excess sold to meet other family needs. On the other hand, the main cash crops include sugar cane, cotton, palm oil, coffee, sunflower, and tobacco. Most families integrate livestock production with farming. The main livestock kept include cattle, sheep, goats, donkeys, pigs, poultry, and bees. Most of this is on a small scale but some farmers also produce milk and poultry products for commercial use. Milk farmers sell their milk though cooperative societies, including Sang'alo, Kikai, and Naitiri.

=== Manufacturing ===
Rai Paper, formerly Pan-African Paper Mills (East Africa) Limited, is one of the largest manufacturing companies in the county. The company, which was incorporated in 1969, is based in Webuye Town and manufactures paper products. Pan Paper, as it was commonly known, struggled and eventually collapsed in 2009 due to a myriad of factors, including mismanagement. In its heyday, Pan Paper was the largest company in Bungoma and employed 5,000 people directly and another 30,000 indirectly. Due to its importance to the economy of Webuye Town, the collapse brought the town to its knees, with most businesses shutting down. In an effort to revive the company, the government of Kenya privatized it in 2016 and it was bought by Tarlochan Ltd, a subsidiary of Rai Group of Companies, for Ksh 900 million (US$9 million). Due to long neglect, the company needed a major overhaul of machinery, with the new owner saying it would cost about Ksh 6 billion (US$60 million) to fully rehabilitate. Today, the company is operating on a lower scale and employs about 500 people.

Nzoia Sugar Company Ltd is the other major manufacturing company in the county. Established in 1975, the company serves over 67,000 farmers within and outside of Bungoma County. The company's nucleus cane estate covers 3,600 hectares, while the out-grower zone spans over 23,500 hectares. Nzoia Sugar has however not provided farmers with a stable source of income. Frequent closures, occasioned by mismanagement, huge debts, and failure to pay farmers, who in turn refuse to supply cane, have continued to hinder its operations.

The other factories and industries in the county include Malakisi Tobacco Leaf Centre, Webuye Heavy Chemicals Industry, and small coffee factories. Milk plants and large bread bakeries are also present in the county.

=== Services sector ===
Bungoma is served by several financial institutions, including major banks such as Barclays, KCB, Equity, Cooperative, National, Family, Diamond Trust, and Bank of Africa. The county also has several micro-finance institutions, including K-Rep and Kenya Women Finance Trust. Insurance companies with a presence in the county include British American, Geminia, Pan African, Blue Shield, and Amaco, among others. The county is served by several post offices, and major mobile telephone operators in Kenya including Safaricom, Airtel, and Telkom. Courier operators in the county include G4S Security and Wells Fargo. Some of these service providers, such as Safaricom, employ hundreds through their services such as Mpesa.

=== Tourism ===
Despite having some potential for tourism, including the Mt. Elgon National Park and cultural events such as traditional circumcision, Bungoma's tourism sector is under-developed. It is only recently that an upsurge of the hotel industry has been experienced, mainly driven by business travelers.

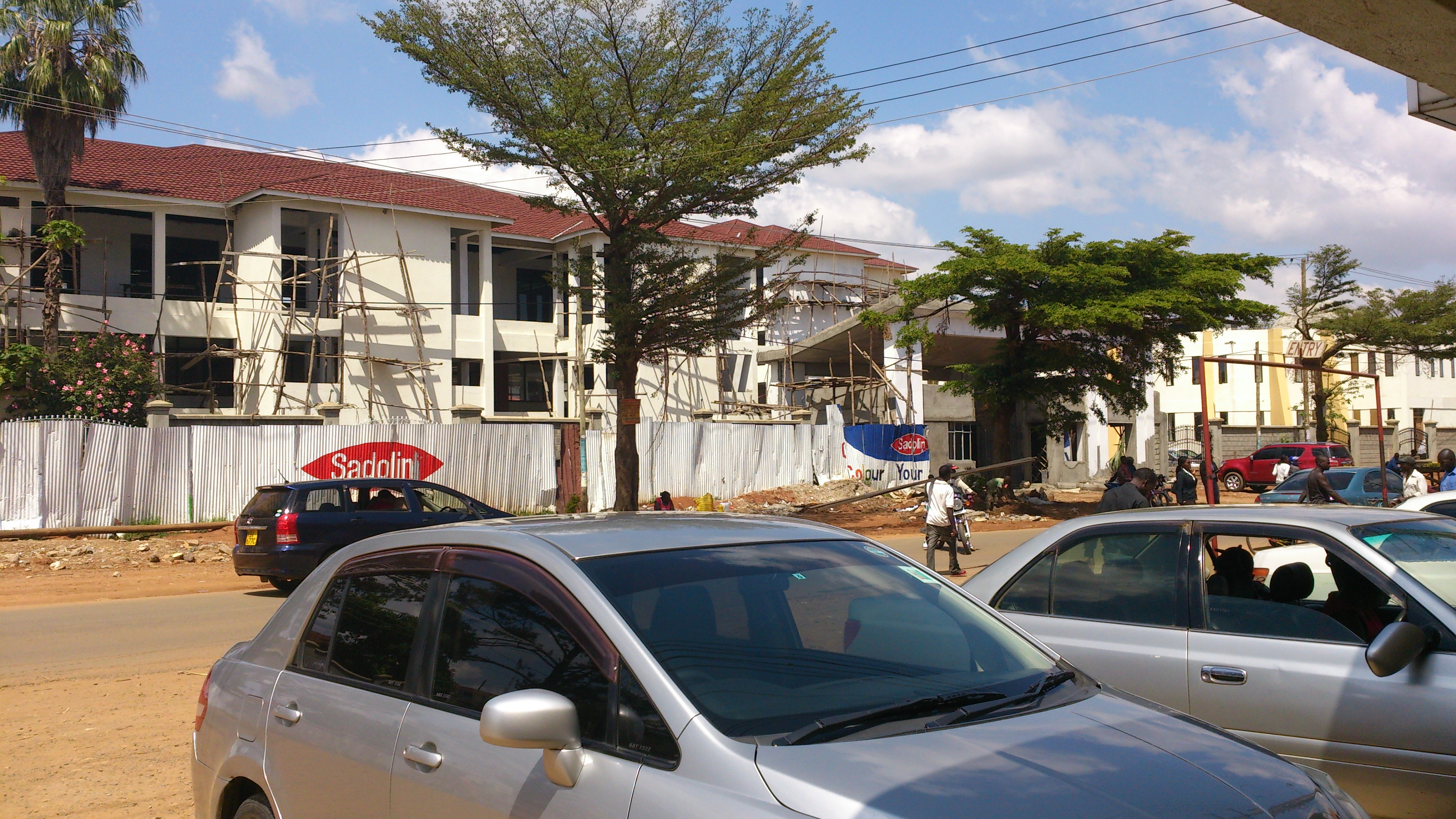
Bungoma Tourist Hotel undergoing renovation in 2015

=== Retail ===
Bungoma County has had a vibrant retail sector which has been growing. The major supermarkets operating in the county include Nakumatt, Naivas, Khetias, and Shariffs. Chepkube and Kimilili Market are the county's leading secondhand clothes market, which provides entrepreneurship opportunities to many residents.

== Education ==
There are a total of 1292 ECD centres, 961 primary schools and 306 secondary schools.

The main university in the area is Kibabii University, which was chartered in 2015, and is a public university located about 10 km from Bungoma Town, along the Chwele-Kimilili Road. The vice chancellor is Professor Isaac Odeo Ipara. Masinde Muliro University of Science and Technology (MMUST) has campuses at Bungoma and Webuye. Other major educational institutions of higher learning include SACRED Training Institute (STI), Sang'alo Institute of Science and Technology, Matili Polytechnic, Kisiwa Polytechnic, Bungoma North Technical Vocational College Kibabii Diploma Teacher's College.

The county also has major national and county schools, such as Vunjosi FYM Sec School, Friends School Kamusinga, Lugulu Girls, Kibabii High School, Chwele Girls, Misikhu Girls, Naitiri boys, St. Luke's Boys' High School, Magemo friends, Ndivisi Secondary and Bungoma High School. The residents of the county highly value education and invest a great deal in it.

Major professionals that have been through the higher education sector in Kenya include Prof. Kassily (medic), Prof. Simiyu Wandibba (archaeology), Prof. Vincent Simiyu (history), Prof. Henry Kerre (education), Prof. Monica Mwiseli (maths), Prof. Barasa Wangila (aquaculture), Eng. Prof. Sibilike K. Makhanu (Professor of Civil Engineering), Prof. Eusebius Mukhwana (agriculture/educationist), Prof Adrian Mukhebi (agriculture), and Prof. Ngome Kibanani.

== Health ==
Bungoma county has 11 hospitals, 19 health centres, 96 dispensaries and 178 clinics.

There is a total of 915 bed capacity in the county with distribution as follows; level five has 216 beds, level four 462 beds, level three 176 and level 2 61 beds.

== NGOs ==
There are a number of non-governmental organizations currently working in Bungoma. One Acre Fund in an effort to improve farming incomes, is introducing more profitable crops and farming techniques to farmers and providing farming inputs in exchange for a share of future revenues. For over 15 years, SACRED Africa has been working with farmers to improve farm productivity, soil health, Technology transfer and marketing of agricultural produce. The organization pioneered the concept of cereal banking in western Kenya which won a UN award for innovative resolution of challenges facing smallholder marketing.

Sun24 has trained over 60,000 women in Bungoma to cook with rock beds in their traditional wood cookstoves. Rock beds are free and cut firewood usage by a third and cut smoke by much more.

Village Enterprise has trained more than 600,000 women in Bungoma on how to start, develop and sustain businesses in the county. They have also encouraged the registration of women groups in order to facilitate them to a bigger pool of resources from the government in order to improve livelihoods.

== Services and urbanisation ==
Stats for Bungoma County
County	Stats for the County (Per cent)
Urbanisation	21.7
Literacy	60.5
Attending School (15-18 Yrs)	87.6
Paved Roads	6
Good Roads	46.7
Electricity Access	4.5
Poverty Rate	52.9
Stats for the County

Source: USAid Kenya

== Administration ==
Local authorities (councils)
Authority	Type	Population*	Urban pop.*
Bungoma	Municipality	60,650	44,196
Kimilili	Municipality	71,299	10,261
Webuye	Municipality	48,806	19,606
Malakisi	Town	38,004	3,762
Sirisia	Town	22,703	822
Bungoma County	County	635,029	10,852
Total	-	876,491	89,499
* 1999 census. Source:

Administrative divisions
Division	Population*	Urban pop.*	Headquarters
Bumula	129,011	500	Bumula
Central	60,605	513	Nalondo
Chwele	41,174	2,677	Chwele
Kanduyi	163,568	38,407	Bungoma
Kimilili	96,674	9,631	Kimilili
Malakisi	36,042	3,341	Malakisi
Ndivisi	57,336	1,905	Ndivisi
Sirisia	44,088	769	Sirisia
Tongaren	133,296	5,313	Naitiri
Webuye	114,697	18,257	Webuye
Total	876,491	109,490	-
* 1999 census. Sources:

The county has nine constituencies:

- Bumula Constituency
- Kabuchai Constituency
- Kanduyi Constituency
- Kimilili Constituency
- Mt. Elgon Constituency
- Sirisia Constituency
- Tongaren Constituency
- Webuye West Constituency
- Webuye East Constituency

== Villages and settlements ==
- Chelebei
- Chesikaki
- Kamukuywa
- Kapsokwany
- Kamusinga
- Laboot
- Mbakalo
- Kibisi
- Lunyu
- karima
- Mukomari

== See also ==
- Trans Nzoia County
- Uasin Gishu County
- Nandi County
- Kakamega County
- Busia County
- Kisumu County
