= Chinese Kenyan =

Chinese(-)Kenyan or Kenyan(-)Chinese may refer to:

- People's Republic of China–Kenya relations (c.f. a "Chinese–Kenyan treaty)
- Chinese people in Kenya
- Kenyans in China
- People with dual citizenship of China and Kenya
- Afro-Asian people of mixed Chinese and Kenyan descent
