= Kakai =

Kakai may refer to:

- Kaka'i, also called Yarsan or Ahl-e Haqq, followers of Yarsanism, a religion of Iran and Iraq
- Neferirkare Kakai, pharaoh of Egypt during the fifth dynasty

== People with the name ==
- Kakai Kilonzo, musician from Kenya
- Kakai Khan, Afghan Guantanamo detainee
- Kakai Kissinger, Kenyan human rights activist

== See also ==
- Cacai Bautista, musician from the Philippines
