= Cleopa =

Cleopa is a given name. Notable people with the name include:

- Cleopa Ilie (1912–1998), Romanian Orthodox monk
- Cleopa Kilonzo Mailu (born c. 1956), Kenyan politician
- Cleopa Msuya (1931–2025), Tanzanian politician
