= Global Leadership Adventures =

High school study abroad program

Global Leadership Adventures (GLA) offers high school study abroad programs where students engage in service-learning in Belize, Brazil, Costa Rica, Dominican Republic, Ecuador (Galápagos Islands), Fiji, France (Guadeloupe), Ghana, Guatemala, Indonesia (Bali), Morocco, Peru, South Africa, Tanzania, and Thailand. In 2019, the company launched Europe Discovery programs in the UK, France, Greece, Spain, and other countries throughout the European continent.

Global Leadership Adventures was founded by Fred Swaniker as a precursor to the African Leadership Academy, based in Johannesburg, South Africa but became a separate entity in 2004. The organization headquarters is currently based in San Diego, United States. GLA is a division of Terra Education, which is a certified benefit corporation (B-Corp). Other companies with Terra Education include Summer Springboard and Discover Corps.

In 2005 and again in 2008, GLA hosted Archbishop Desmond Tutu in South Africa to speak about the legacy of Apartheid. In 2007, GLA students met with Costa Rican president and Nobel Peace Prize Winner Oscar Arias to discuss the Central American Free Trade Agreement (CAFTA) which was to be voted upon in a national referendum in Costa Rica.

GLA has been featured by a number of publications, including the New York Times, The Boston Globe, Teen Vogue, and The Huffington Post. GLA has a growing alumni base, with student alumni hailing from over 50 countries.
