= Friends' School Kamusinga =

National, Public School in Kimilili, Bungoma, Kenya

Friends School Kamusinga

Location
- P.O. Box Private bag- 50204; Kimilili, Bungoma; Kenya; 0°47′39″N 34°42′24″E

Information
- Other names: Kamu/Frishka
- School type: National, public
- Motto: Use Common Sense
- Established: 1956
- Founder: Allan Bradley (British Native)
- Principal: Paul Weloba Wanyonyi
- Staff: unknown
- Gender: Male
- Enrollment: 2100
- Campus type: Suburban, on the slopes of Mt Elgon
- Colors: Blue, black, grey and white
- Mascot: Cheetah
- Website: www.friendsschoolkamusinga.sc.ke

Friends' School Kamusinga (FSK), popularly known as Kamu/Frishka, is a Kenyan Quaker national school established in 1956 and located in Kimilili, Bungoma County, Kenya. The school is located 409.9 kilometres from Kenya's capital city, Nairobi. It is annually ranked among the top schools nationwide in KCSE and has many notable alumni across business, creative arts, sports, engineering and politics.

Kamusinga is regarded as an academic and extra-curricular giant for its superior performance in national examinations of KCSE and in nationwide and East African regional extra-curricular competitions of field hockey, basketball, science congress, drama and music festival competitions over the years.

== History ==
The school was established by Allan Bradley (a British Native who died aged 90 in February 2000) in 1956 as a transfer unit for Friends School Kaimosi from Kaimosi in Vihiga County. He is remembered by the school by holding an annual intra-school sports tournaments dubbed 'Allan Bradley's Day', held on 18 February of every year. The first Allan Bradley's Day Tournament was on 18 February 2006.

The school continues to maintain relations with members of the Allan Bradley family such as Ruth Bradley and Peter Bradley who find possible ways to support the school whenever possible.

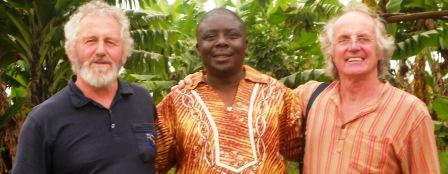
Peter Bradley (left; son of school founder) with former school principal Edwin Namachanja

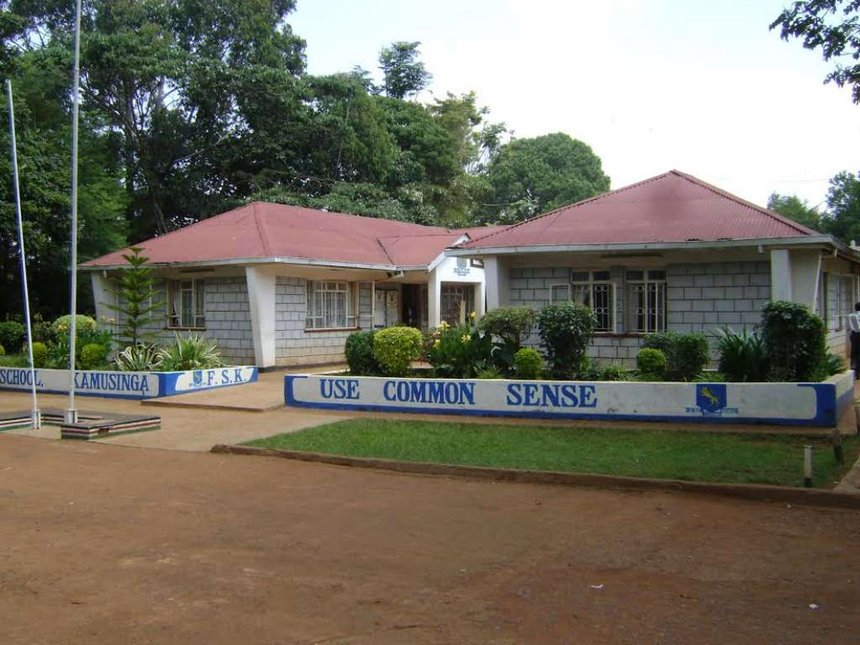
School administration block building

== Academics ==
=== National exam performance ===
The school produced the best 2006 K.C.S.E. (Kenya Certificate of Secondary Education) national candidate, Dickens Omanga.

Due to scrapping of school rankings nationwide by the Ministry of Education, the ranking of the school is not available since 2018. Based on performance comparison the school boasts production of the highest number of A, A- and B+ grades compared to most schools in the country, making it still one of the top schools in the country. In 2011, before ranking was abolished, the school ranked 12th nationwide. In 2016 it ranked 4th. In 2017 it emerged position 15. In 2021 it ranked 7th nationally. In 2024 it ranked 12th nationally.

=== Administration ===
The school is headed by Paul Weloba Wanyonyi, who took over the helm in January 2023. The school was previously headed by Alex Kariuki from 2018 to January 2023. He retired in January 2023.

=== Notable former staff ===
==== 1960s ====
Nicolas Guy Barnett was a British teaching member of staff between 1960 and 1961. He later became member of parliament of South Dorset between 1962 and 1964, and later Greenwich between 1971 and 1986 in the 42nd and 45th Parliament of the United Kingdom.

==== 1990s to present ====
The school was previously headed by Simon Nabukwesi who headed the school from 1998 to January 2009, when he was appointed as Kenyan ambassador to Canada in a series of diplomatic appointments by Kenya's 3rd president Mwai Kibaki.

Before Nabukwesi's helm at the school, Christopher Khaemba was the principal from 1995 to 1998 before transferring to Alliance High School as principal, and thereafter to African Leadership Academy as the school's founding dean in Johannesburg, South Africa. He is currently the director and co-founder of the Nova Pioneer Academies, which operates in Kenya and South Africa.

=== Departments ===
The school comprises ten departments that oversee the school programs and curricular activities. These are the Examination Department, Technical Department, Sciences Department, Math Department, Swahili & Other Languages Departments, English & Libraries Department, Games Department, Boarding Department, School Worship Program Department, and Guidance & Counselling Department.

The heads of each department are appointed by the school principal.

=== Board of Governors ===
The school has a board of management (B.O.G.) and Parents Teachers Association (P.T.A.) organs that assist the school administration in leadership and management.

=== Student admission ===
Every year, 300-600 students are selected based on academic merit and quota as per the Kenyan standard education policy. Academic merit is based on performance on the K.C.P.E. (Kenya Certificate of Primary Education) exams. Its quota system ensures that the school admits boys from every county in the country, though with bias to students from public schools as the current education policy requires.

Students are admitted on a need-blind basis. At any given time, there are needy students whose tuition and boarding fees are paid by parties other than their parents or guardians.

=== Matriculation and university enrollment ===
On average the school's final year candidates get up to 98% admission into top universities in the country by merit through standard Kenyan public university placement procedures for students who have excelled on the Kenya Certificate of Secondary Education. By virtue of the school's ranking over the years, with most students scoring A, A- and B+, most students get into university through merit.

== Emblem ==
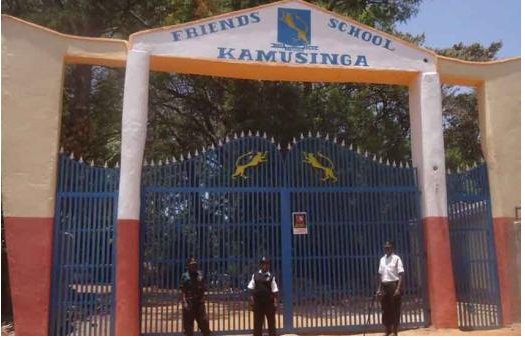
Kamusinga school gate with the school emblem

=== School seal ===
The emblem is a cheetah poised on its back limbs which appears to be clawing the air.

A banner is floated below the emblem, reading "Use Common Sense".

== Student life ==
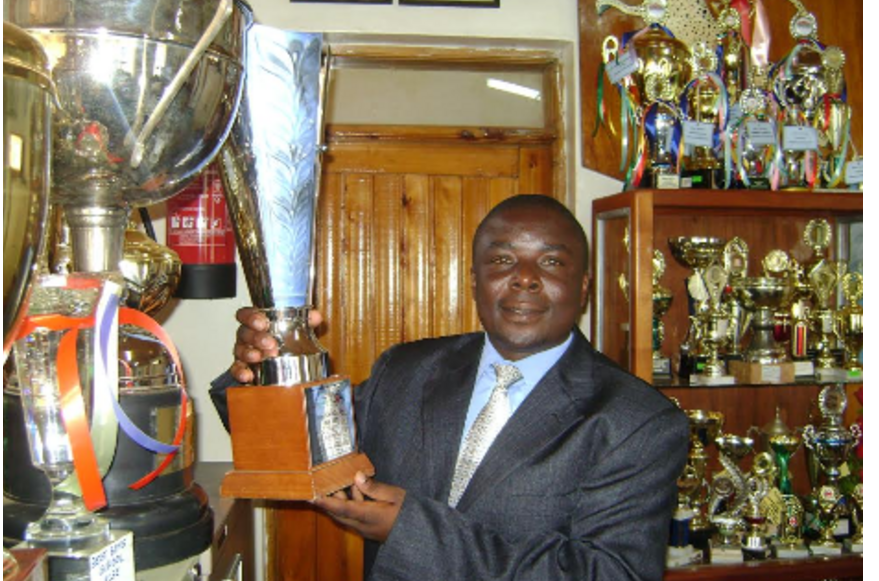
Former school principal Edwin Namachanja, showcasing some of the school's accolades

=== Culture ===
Upon arrival, every form 1 student is assigned to a 'guardian' who is a form 2 student who will help the new student find his way around the school in the first few weeks.

The school had a compulsory use of full cutlery set – fork, spoon and knife – during meals(currently only a spoon is required), which was resisted by shagz-modos, but most students and alumni are now grateful as it accounts for their refined etiquette.

Various platforms like the drama and music competitions provide students with a chance to showcase their talents. The drama club organizes the biggest comic show of the entire year called "Talents Night" where students simulate the Monday morning school assembly and imitate their teachers.

Students are also given a chance to showcase their talents during the interclass and interhouse competitions. Disciplines of all sorts including indoor sports are showcased.

=== Houses ===
The school has 20 houses

- Victory House
- Elgon House
- Kenya House
- Kenyatta House
- Aggrey house
- Chetambe House
- Nakhisa House
- Nyerere house
- Jamhuri wing A
- Jamhuri wing B
- Jamhuri wing c
- Jamhuri wing D
- Jamhuri wing E
- Jamhuri wing F
- Amugune house
- Dr. Mailu House
- Muliro House
- Harambee House
- Nyayo House
- Allan Bradley House

=== Prefects ===
The prefects are key to the running of the school. They see that the school routine and school rules are adhered to. They have the authority to punish culprits via the prefect's punishment department. Punishments include washing corridors and rooms and in some extreme cases, working in the school farm or tending to flowerbeds. Punishees are announced on parade everyday of the week and assigned for punishment.

A total of about 110 prefects are chosen each year. 24 of the most outstanding prefects are given top honors in becoming Senior Prefects or Captains. These Captains are allocated various major departments in the school. The school's departments include:

- Dining Hall
- Entertainment
- Games
- Library
- Computer Lab
- Academic

== Extra-curricular activities ==
=== Sports ===
Kamusinga offers its students opportunities to play various sports and join teams that participate in various tournaments. The sports include swimming, badminton, table tennis, hockey, basketball, rugby, volleyball, handball and soccer.

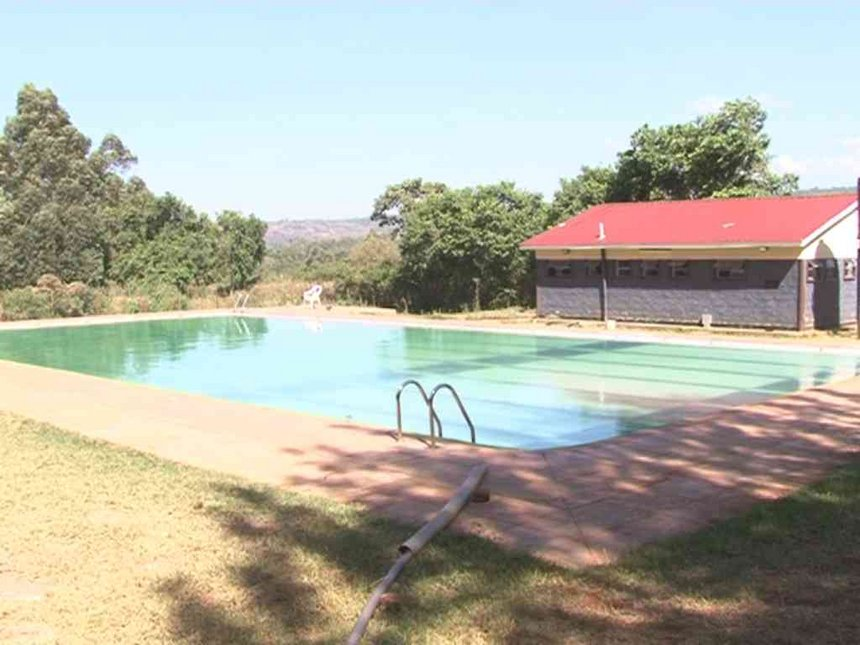
School swimming pool

==== Field hockey ====
The school has won Kenya national secondary schools games in hockey 19 times as well as East Africa regional hockey games 18 times since 1999, except for 2010, 2015 and 2017 since the introduction of the game in the school in 1997.

==== Basketball ====
The school has a basketball team referred to as the Tigers. The school has represented the Western Province at the nationals since 2004. In 2009 it was the first runner-up while in 2011 it was the 2nd runner-up at the K.S.S.S.A. (Kenya Secondary Schools Sports Association) national term 1A ball games. Over the years the school has continued to be one of the best basketball teams in the country and east Africa games because of its sterling performance.

=== Drama ===
The school's dramatics club has over the years represented Western Province in the National Drama festivals in the Narrative category, winning in the whole country and entertaining the head of state from 1999 until 2006. The drama club at the time was headed by Mark Mutali Chetambe and Isaac Shitubi. They produced various narrators and actors including Isaac Mwaura, Augustine Oluoch, John Paul Wafula and Jimmy Wanjala. in 2019 other actors like Brandon Karoli and Bakuli Hemed emerged

=== Science Congress ===
The school has a Science Congress team which is currently ranked 'The Best Boys School in Kenya', 'Best School in Science' nationally in the field and overall ranked fifth nationally.

=== Clubs and societies ===
There are over 20 clubs and societies including the Amateur Radio Club, the Dramatic Society, Law and Debate Club, Scouting, the White Fingers Peace Initiative, the Computer Club, Science Congress, the International Information Exchange Program Club, the School Choir, the Science and Robotics Club, the Integrity Club, the Writers' Club, the Poetry Society, Kiswahili Club, the Model United Nations, the Christian Union, and Muslim Association.

== Notable alumni ==
- Henry Chakava, Kenyan publisher
- Benjamin Cheboi, first governor of Baringo County, currently a politician affiliated to URP party
- Chris Kirubi, businessman, entrepreneur, industrialist and philanthropist. Served as a director of Centum Investment Company
- Kakai Kissinger, human rights activist and attorney, former Chief Registrar of the Judiciary of Kenya
- Kenneth Lusaka, Speaker of the Senate of Kenya, first governor of Bungoma County
- Cleopa Kilonzo Mailu, Kenya's ambassador and Permanent Representative to the United Nations World Trade and former Kenyan Cabinet Secretary for Health
- Cleophas Malala, senator, Kakamega County
- Peter Mulwa Felix Mbithi, Former Head of Public Service (1991-1996),7th Vice Chancellor of University of Nairobi.
- Paul Kiongera Mungai, professional footballer in the Kenyan Premier League
- Mubarak Muyika, Internet entrepreneur and businessman
- Arthur Obel, Former Chief Medical Researcher Officer of KEMRI
- Ferdinand Omanyala , sprinter and 2020 Olympics record holder
- Tylor Ongwae, basketball player for Bakken Bears, Kenya's National Basketball Team and holder of three Basketligaen titles.
- Alfred Sambu, former Member of Parliament, Webuye and AFC Leopards SC, Chairman
- Moses Wetang'ula, served in the Government of Kenya as Minister for Foreign Affairs 2008–2010 and 2011–2012; Minister for Trade 2012–2013
