= Halfrican =

Halfrican may refer to:

- Afro Latinos*
- Afro-Asian
- Mulatto
- Multiracial
