= African Leadership University =

African higher education network

- Established: 2015
- Location: Main campus: Pamplemousses district, Mauritius; Secondary campus: Kigali, Rwanda

African Leadership University (ALU) is a network of tertiary institutions operating in Mauritius and Rwanda, offering bachelor's degree programs.

ALU's inaugural campus, known as the African Leadership College, was established in September 2015 in Mauritius. Subsequently, in September 2017, ALU launched its second campus in Kigali, Rwanda.

== History ==
In 2008, Fred Swaniker, an African leadership development expert and Stanford Business School-educated social entrepreneur, founded ALU's sister organization, the African Leadership Academy, a secondary institution. In 2015, Swaniker expanded his efforts further by establishing an institution of higher learning, the African Leadership University, dedicated to teaching leadership skills. In 2015, ALU opened its doors to more than 180 students from across Africa on its main campus in Mauritius. In 2019, ALU made it to Fast Company's list of the world's 50 most innovative companies.

== Campuses ==
=== ALC ===
ALC's main campus is located in Pamplemousses, the northern region of Mauritius. ALC Mauritius is a residential campus. The campus opened in October 2015 with 173 students in the inaugural class of 2015. In 2018, the number of students was over 300. ALC offers undergraduate degree programs through its founding academic partner, Glasgow Caledonian University. ALC offers four different degrees.

=== ALU Rwanda ===
ALU Rwanda is located in Kigali, Rwanda. The institution holds accreditation from the Higher Education Council of Rwanda. The undergraduate campus opened in September 2017 with 270 students, while the African Leadership School of Business started its blended Master of Business Administration program in September 2016. ALU Rwanda expanded to Kigali's new Innovation City, where a permanent campus was completed in 2020. ALU Rwanda is a residential campus.
