= Christopher Khaemba =

Kenyan educator

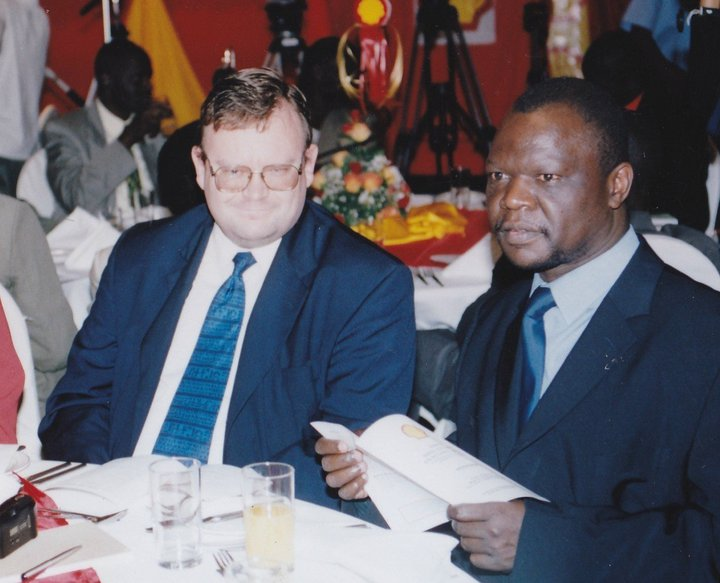
Christopher Situma Khaemba

Christopher Situma Khaemba is a Kenyan educator, and the former dean of the African Leadership Academy (ALA) in South Africa. Khaemba became the first dean of the ALA in September 2008, moving from his role as principal of Alliance High School in Kenya to take up the position. Before that he had served as principal of Friends School Kamusinga for three years and Alliance for 10 years.

== Early life ==
Khaemba attended Kenyatta University, Nairobi, graduating with an MBA. He was an officer and pilot with the Kenya Air Force before quitting in 1984 and moving into teaching.

== Alliance High School ==
He joined the teaching staff at Alliance High School as a mathematics and physics teacher, remaining there for the next 14 years. During that time, he rose up through the ranks to become principal. He was appointed by the government as principal of Friends School Kamusinga in 1995 to address the declining standards in the school, which he achieved within three years, and was recalled to be the principal of Alliance again in 1998.

Under Khaemba's term as principal, Alliance was consistently ranked within the top ten best performing schools in the Kenya Certificate of Secondary Education.

== African Leadership Academy ==
Khaemba was head-hunted to be the inaugural dean of the African Leadership Academy in Johannesburg, South Africa, in 2008. The founders of the school, who include Fred Swaniker (CEO), Acha Leke and Peter Mobaur, chose Khaemba through a seven-month process, and stated that Khaemba stood out due to his record at Alliance High School and Kamusinga.

As of 2016, Khaemba sits on the Global Advisory Board of the ALA, and still supports the school with fundraising and alumni support.

== Later career ==
Khaemba was appointed education advisor in the office of the prime minister of Kenya in January 2012. He served in that position till April 2013, when a new government was formed, and the office of the prime minister abolished. He moved to the Teachers Service Commission where he served as deputy director of teacher management for four months, until September 2013, when he was appointed to serve on the Nairobi City County cabinet as the executive in charge of education, youth affairs and social services. In February 2016, Khaemba was moved to the Urban Planning and Lands sector as the executive in charge.

== Nova Pioneer ==
In 2015, in collaboration with Oliver Sabot, Oliver Rothschild and Chinezi Chijioke, Khaemba established a new educational program in Kenya, Nova Pioneer, based on the African Leadership Academy model of an academic curriculum with additional leadership programs. The first Nova Pioneer School opened in January 2016 with 128 male students. A girls' school, Nova Pioneer Girls High School, opened in January 2017, while Nova Pioneer Primary - Tatu City opened in 2018. By September 2022, Nova Pioneer had six campuses in Kenya.
