= Inauguration of Hage Geingob =

- Date: 21 March 2015; 11 years ago
- Location: Independence Stadium Windhoek, Namibia
- Participants: Hage Geingob; Foreign Dignitaries (15 HOSG)

The inauguration of Hage Geingob as the 3rd president of Namibia took place on Saturday, 21 March 2015. The inauguration marked the beginning of the first term of Hage Geingob as President following the general election. It coincided with the 25th independence anniversary celebrations.

== Attendance ==
=== Dignitaries ===
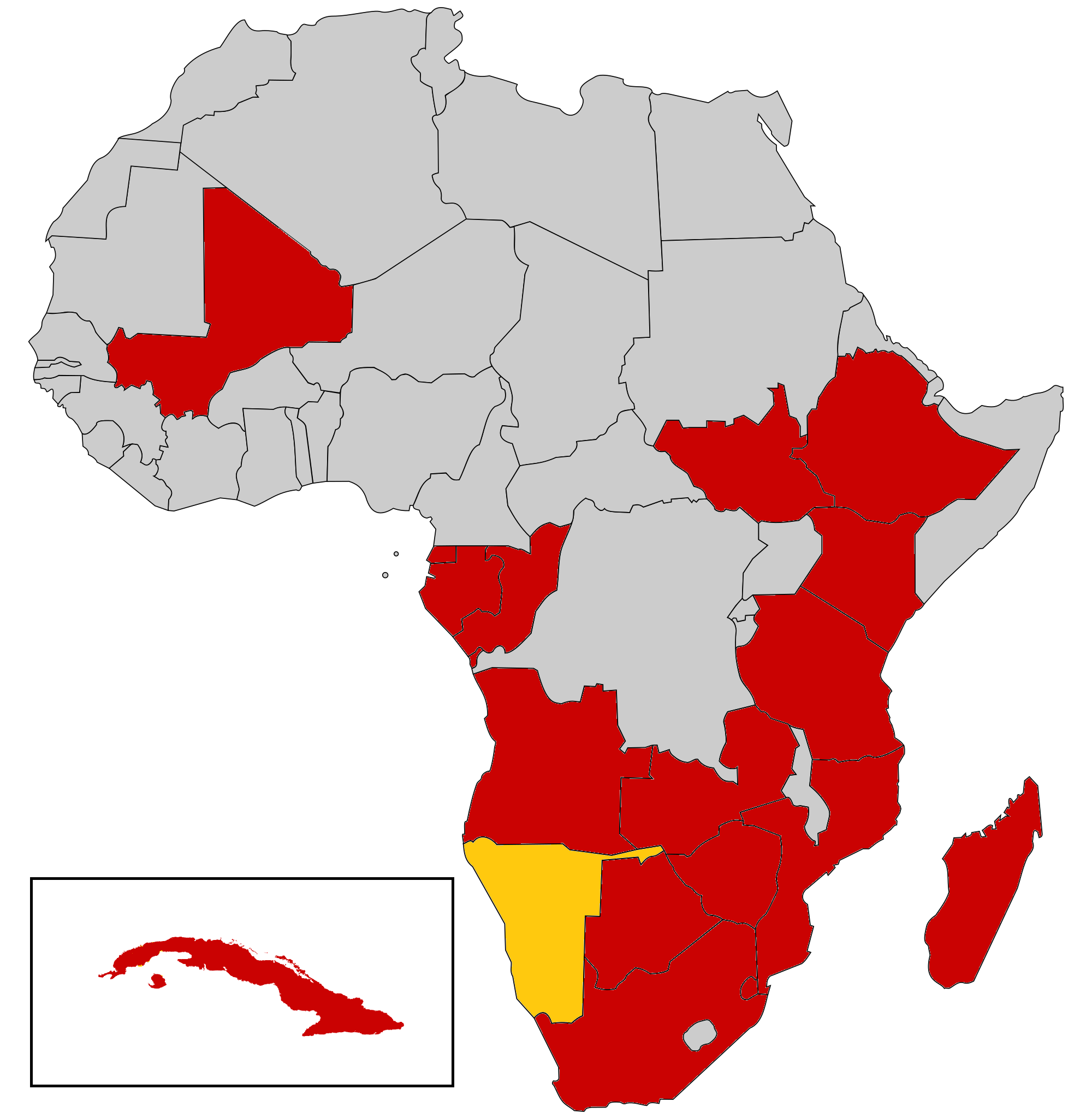
Foreign heads of states and governments who attended the ceremony.

Country	Title	Dignitary
Angola	President	José Eduardo dos Santos
Botswana	President	Ian Khama
Congo	President	Denis Sassou Nguesso
Cuba	Vice President	Miguel Díaz-Canel
Equatorial Guinea	President	Teodoro Obiang Nguema Mbasogo
Ethiopia	Prime Minister	Hailemariam Desalegn
Gabon	President	Ali Bongo Ondimba
Kenya	President	Uhuru Kenyatta
Madagascar	President	Hery Rajaonarimampianina
Mali	President	Ibrahim Boubacar Keïta
Mozambique	President	Filipe Nyusi
South Africa	Deputy President	Cyril Ramaphosa
South Sudan	President	Salva Kiir
Swaziland	King	Mswati III
Tanzania	President	Jakaya Kikwete
Zambia	President	Edgar Lungu
Zimbabwe	President	Robert Mugabe

=== Government representatives ===
Country	Title	Dignitary
Botswana	Foreign Minister	Pelonomi Venson-Moitoi
China	Transport Minister	Yang Chuantang
Kenya	Foreign Minister	Amina Mohamed
Kenya	Transport Minister	Michael Kamau
Palestine	Foreign Minister	Riyad al-Maliki
Malawi	Foreign Minister	George Chaponda
Sahrawi Republic	Foreign Minister	Mohamed Salem Ould Salek
South Africa	Foreign Minister	Maite Nkoana-Mashabane
Tanzania	Foreign Minister	Bernard Membe
United States	Deputy Secretary of State	Heather Higginbottom
Zimbabwe	Foreign Minister	Simbarashe Mumbengegwi
Zambia	Foreign Minister	Harry Kalaba
Zimbabwe	Local Government Minister	Ignatius Chombo

=== Former leaders ===
Country	Title	Dignitary
Finland	10th President	Martti Ahtisaari
Ghana	President	Jerry Rawlings
Nigeria	President	Olusegun Obasanjo
South Africa	2nd President	Thabo Mbeki
Tanzania	2nd President	Ali Hassan Mwinyi
Tanzania	3rd President	Benjamin Mkapa
Zambia	1st President	Kenneth Kaunda
Zambia	4th President	Rupiah Banda

=== International organisations ===
Organisation	Title	Dignitary
African Union	Chairperson of the AU Commission	Nkosazana Dlamini-Zuma
Southern African Development Community	Executive Secretary	Stergomena Tax
