= Cleopa Kilonzo Mailu =

Kenyan politician

Permanent Mission of the Republic of Kenya to the United Nations Office and other international organizations in Geneva

Permanent Representative
- In office 2018–2022
- Preceded by: John Otachi Kakonge
- Succeeded by: Fancy Chepkemoi Too

Ministry of Health (Kenya)

Cabinet Secretary
- In office 2015–2018
- President: Uhuru Kenyatta
- Preceded by: James Wainaina Macharia
- Succeeded by: Sicily Kariuki

Personal details
- Born: 29 April 1956 (age 70)
- Education: Friends School Kamusinga; University of Nairobi; University of Glasgow
- Profession: Doctor

Cleopa Kilonzo Mailu (born c. 1956) is a Kenyan politician. He served as the Kenyan Minister of Health.

== Education ==
Cleopa Kilonzo Mailu attended schools in Kyulu and Kangundo and later went to Friends School Kamusinga. He graduated from the University of Nairobi with a bachelor of medicine and bachelor of surgery (MBChB) in 1984. He proceeded with his studies and earned a master's degree in medical genetics from the University of Glasgow in 1989.

== Career ==
Mailu started his career as an intern at the Kenyatta National Hospital.

Mailu was the founding director of its department of medical genetics in 1989.

From 1995 to 2000, he worked for the Ministry of Health and led an anti-polio campaign.

Mailu subsequently worked for Unicef and the World Health Organization in Malawi and Zambia.

Mailu became the first African CEO of The Nairobi Hospital in 2003.

On 2 August 2018, Mailu presented his credentials to the Director-General of the United Nations Office at Geneva (UNOG) as the new Permanent Representative of Kenya to the UNOG.

Mailu is Chairing the Meeting of State Parties (22-25 November 2021) of the Biological Weapons Convention in Geneva.

== Personal life ==
Mailu has a wife, Teresa, and two sons.
