= China–Kenya relations =

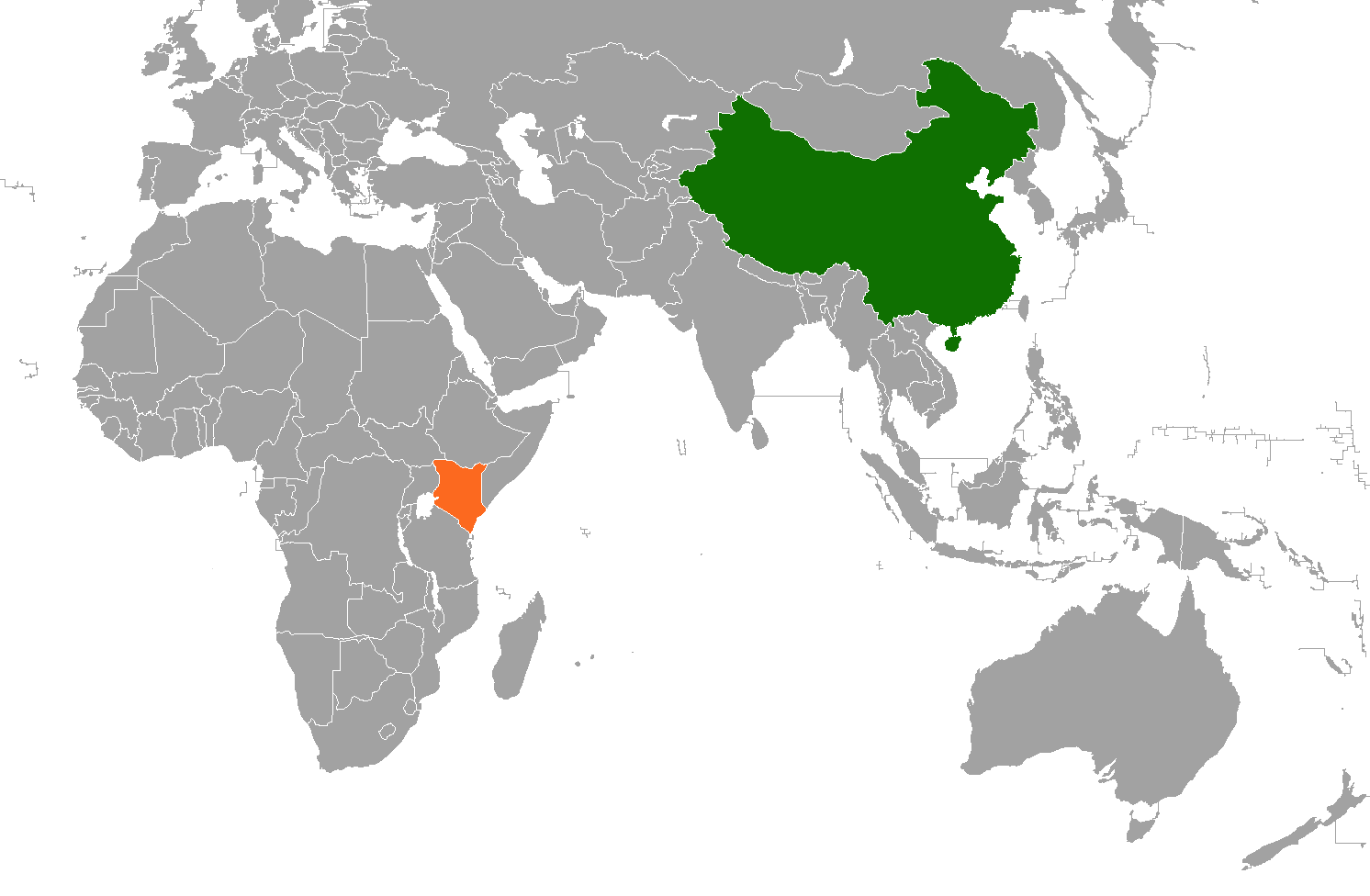
- China: Kenya

The People's Republic of China (PRC) and Kenya established diplomatic relations in 1963, suspended ties temporarily in 1967, but ultimately re-established diplomatic relations in 1978. Since then, they have significantly expanded their economic and investment agreements, such that the PRC is currently Kenya's largest trading partner. In 2017, the two countries signed a strategic partnership.

While the robust trade, investment, and Chinese-led infrastructure projects have benefitted Kenya's overall development and have been labelled by both governments as "win-win" collaborations, local media and foreign analysts have increasingly criticized both the potential consequences of Kenya's loans from China as well as Kenya's overall economic dependence on foreign capital and products. The most ambitious collaboration, the Standard Gauge Rail that was planned to connect Nairobi, Kenya, Uganda, South Sudan, and Rwanda using Chinese financing and contractors, has attracted even more controversy due to financial complications, questions on the legality of its tender process, and the alleged collateralization of Kenya's Mombasa port.

== Political ties ==
Bilateral relations date back to 14 December 1963, two days after the formal establishment of Kenyan independence, when China became the fourth country to open an embassy in Nairobi.

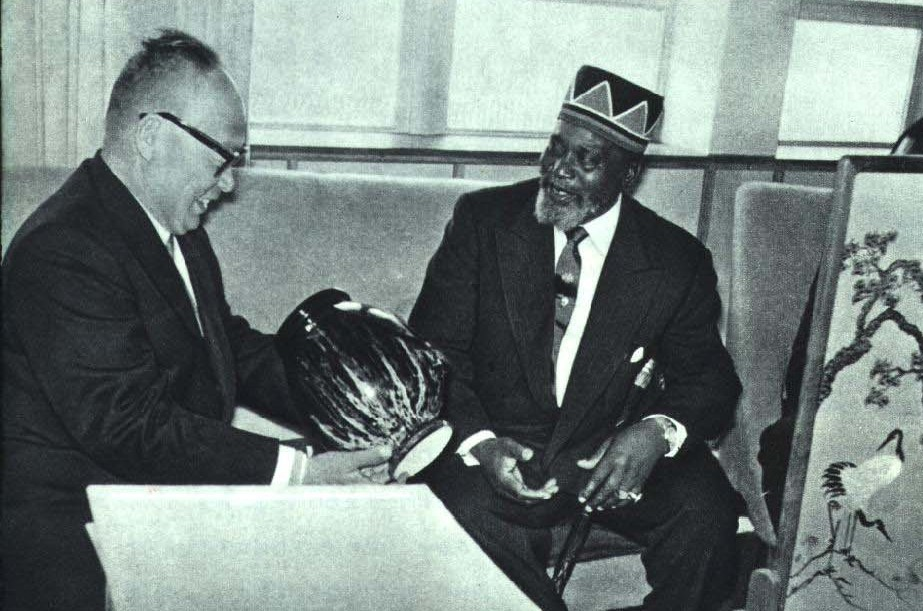
Chinese Foreign Minister Chen Yi meeting with Jomo Kenyatta on his visit to Kenya in February 1964

Over the following decade, China-diplomatic relations became extremely fraught. The Kenyan government claimed that a local coup was receiving Beijing's support, which China dismissed as propaganda. Local demonstrations in both countries soon followed in 1966, and both countries severed diplomatic ties and recalled their embassies in 1967.

After 1978, President Daniel Arap Moi's administration began to repair relations with Beijing. These efforts resulted in several high-profile visits and agreements to promote trade, investments, and technological exchange. Simultaneously, military exchange between the two countries expanded in subsequent decades. General Liu Jingsong, commander of the Lanzhou Military Region, led China's first military delegation to Kenya in December 1996; Major General Nick Leshan, commander of the Kenya Air Force, paid a return visit in 1997.

Since 2005, President Mwai Kibaki and his successor President Uhuru Kenyatta have implemented a "Look East" policy as an alternative to Western loans and investment, a foreign policy framework which encompassed a significant expansion of Chinese loans and Chinese-operated infrastructure initiatives. Additionally, Kenyan president Mwai Kibaki visited Beijing in August 2005., which General Secretary of the Chinese Communist Party Hu Jintao reciprocated with a visit to Nairobi. During these meetings, the two governments began coordinating six oil-exploration deals and numerous infrastructure projects.

Early in 2006 CCP General Secretary Hu Jintao signed an oil exploration contract with Kenya; the latest in a series of deals designed to expand Chinese overseas economic engagement with Africa. The deal allowed for China's state-controlled offshore oil and gas company, CNOOC Ltd., to prospect for oil in Kenya, which is just beginning to drill its first exploratory wells on the borders of Sudan and Somalia and in coastal waters. No oil has been produced yet, and there has been no formal estimate of the possible reserves.

In April 2007, the Jinchuan Group, a state-owned metal manufacturing group, became the first Chinese company to enter Kenya's mining sector, purchasing a 20% stake in Tiomin Kenya.

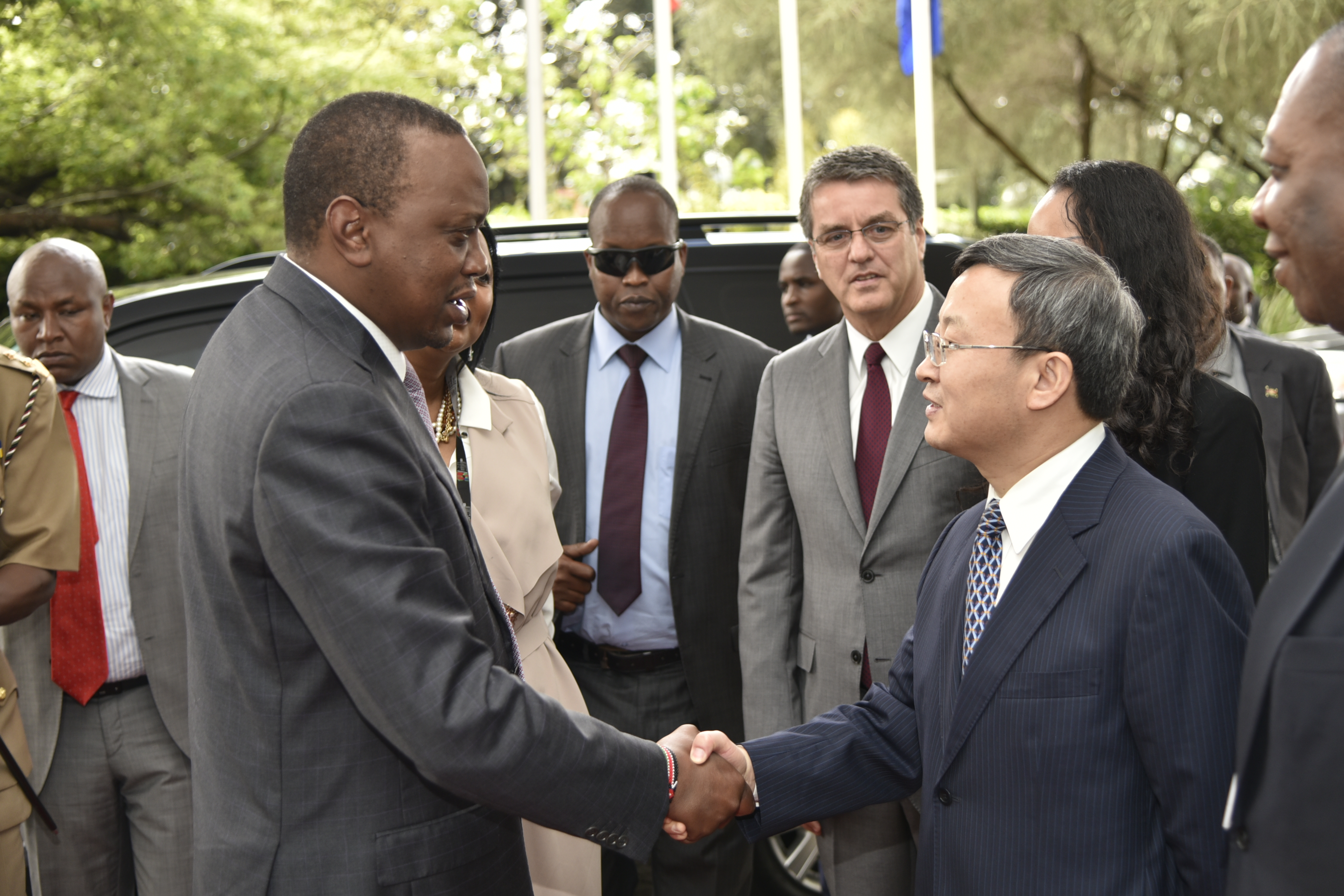
President Uhuru Kenyatta at Nairobi's China Round Table, on 14 December 2015.

In 2008, the Kenyan president announced Vision 2030 to transform Kenya "into a rapidly industrializing middle-income nation by the year 2030", which has further reinforced economic relations with China. In 2011, Kenya and China signed 10 agreements encompassing large-scale collaborations in telecommunications, energy, tourism, healthcare, trade, construction, and education. In 2013, President Uhuru Kenyatta visited China. He held talks with CCP General Secretary Xi Jinping. Kenya and China ended up signing deals worth US$5 billion. Chinese premier Li Keqiang visited Nairobi on his 2014 Africa tour. He and President Kenyatta signed 17 multi-billion-shilling deals to fund multiple infrastructural projects and various agreements. This included the establishment of a China-Africa Development Bank. From 2003 to 2013, trade between the two countries grew by 30% each year.

In 2017, China and Kenya signed a strategic partnership.

=== Cyber-espionage concerns ===
In May 2023, Reuters reported that a Chinese state-linked advanced persistent threat group known as "BackdoorDiplomacy" had targeted Kenyan government institutions for years. The Office of the President of Kenya, Ministry of Finance, and the National Intelligence Service were targeted.

== Economic ties ==
China is Kenya's largest trading partner, with bilateral trade rising rapidly from US$186.37 million in 2002 to $5.3 billion in 2018. Although Kenya's exports of tea, coffee, herbs, and avocados are increasingly attractive to Chinese consumers, Kenya's trade deficit recently reached $7 billion due to the significant investment, trade deals, and developmental assistance it receives from China. Although Chinese firms are recognized for their relative efficiency, affordability, and employment opportunities, trade with China has also attracted several points of criticism in terms of counterfeit Chinese goods, skewed tendering processes for construction firms, the lack of protection of local industries, and racism from Chinese workers against Kenyans.

Kenya joined the Belt and Road Initiative (BRI) in 2017.

Counterfeit products

Chinese products make up the vast majority of counterfeit goods in Kenya, resulting in an annual net loss of $368 million in trade. The Kenyan governments expends somewhere from $84–490 million to prevent and track down counterfeits. According to local surveys, although locals recognize Chinese products as affordable to consumers and beneficial to local small and medium-sized enterprises, the majority are also critical of the low quality of Chinese goods and the danger of misleading healthcare and agricultural products. At the same time, this was framed locally as more of a failure of local legislation rather than a direct criticism of Chinese imports.

In the Anti-Counterfeit Act of 2008, the Kenyan government launched numerous efforts to reduce counterfeit goods and educate the public on how to discern authentic products. However, according to the Consumer Federation of Kenya in 2010, 60% of Kenyan businesses did not view the government response as particularly effective. Despite the comprehensive legal implementation, it has been hampered by understaffing and other logistical issues.

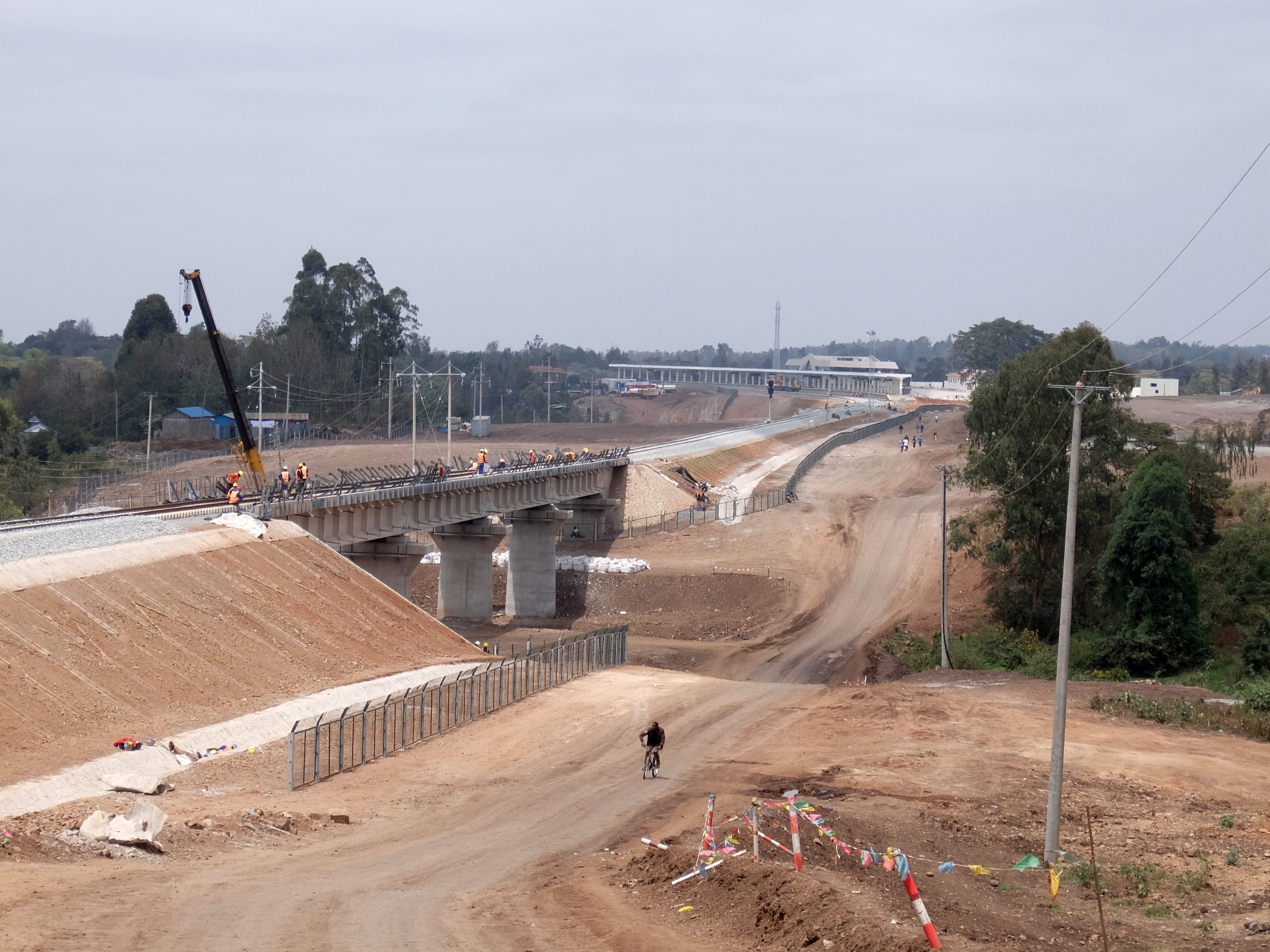
Chinese operators constructing the SGR railway near Ngong, Kenya.

Construction disputes

The influx of Chinese construction firms have received mixed responses. In the 1970s, local construction companies collapsed due to inefficiency, and as a result, a wave of foreign firms moved into the Kenyan construction industry, including Chinese companies. Nairobi has since praised both the affordability, efficiency, and competition that Chinese firms have brought, and the public seems to generally appreciate the improvements to public infrastructure.

However, Kenyan contractors view foreign and often wealthier firms as an unfair playing field, and have increasingly lobbied for protectionist policies. Chinese projects are also often accused of lacking transparency in the tendering process, as well as allegations of backdoor interference from the Kenyan government disadvantaging local contractors. In the National Construction Authority Act of 2010, the Kenyan government expanded regulations regarding the registration of contractors and the fairness of tendering processes.

Competition with local businesses

As mentioned, the significant trade deficit and proliferation of more affordable Chinese products has constricted the market share of local producers. Local businesses are generally critical of Chinese products, as they are often unable to compete with their more efficient foreign counterparts. Some analysts have accused China of deliberately dumping cheap products at the expense of local industries, but others dispute this claim as non-comparative, and instead emphasize the significant price reductions for consumers provided by Chinese projects.

Racist Incidents

Instances of racism by Chinese expatriates accompanying Chinese investments in Kenya towards black Kenyans has been a source of recent controversy. This has negatively impacted bilateral relations between the two countries.

=== Mass media in Kenya ===
In 2012, the Chinese company StarTimes entered Kenya's digital TV market, expanding affordable access and investing in local media infrastructure. While credited with improving connectivity and supporting local content, Mboya & Bhattacharya (2025) noted that it advances Chinese soft power, raising concerns about media independence and foreign influence in Kenya's broadcasting sector.

== Infrastructure and debt financing ==
Countries which signed cooperation documents related to the Belt and Road Initiative

During a visit to China in 1980, Kenyan President Daniel arap Moi requested that China fund a national sports center for Kenya. After signing a series of protocols and agreements, China began work on the Moi International Sports Center in 1982. In 1987, China completed the first phase and turned the center over to Kenya in time for the All-Africa Games later that year.

Over the last couple decades, China's infrastructure investments and loans have been rapidly expanding. Between 2006 and 2017, Kenya has taken large loans of at least $9.8 billion (Sh1043.77 billion) from China, and as of 2019, China accounted for 72% of Kenya's overall foreign debt. As Kenya has become an increasingly crucial part of China's "One Belt, One Road" initiative, a significant portion of these loans are due to Kenya's two flagship infrastructure projects, the Nairobi-Thika Highway Project and the Mombasa-Nairobi Standard Gauge Railway (SGR). The latter has attracted significant concern of "debt-trap diplomacy" and the potential collateralization of Kenya's Mombasa port. Aside from these infrastructural projects, it has also been using Chinese-affiliated loans to develop its educational, construction, healthcare, and agricultural sectors.

=== Nairobi-Thika Highway Project ===
From 2009 to 2013, Kenya borrowed approximately $180 million from the Export-Import Bank of China in order to build the Nairobi Thika Highway Project. Beyond improving mobility for average citizens, it has also efficiently linked much of East Africa to Mombasa, the region's largest port.

=== Mombasa-Nairobi Standard Gauge Railway (SGR) ===
The 485km railway was initially planned to link Kenya, Rwanda, Uganda, and South Sudan, and would have significantly expanded Kenya's trading capacities in what both Kenya and China hailed as a "win-win" developmental project. In 2013, President Uhuru Kenyatta stated that "the project will define my legacy as president of Kenya [and] will most definitely transform . . . not only Kenya but the whole eastern African region." Kenya funded 90% of the railway through a $3.6 billion loan from the Export-Import Bank of China, with an interest rate of 3.6% to be paid within 15 years and a grace period of 5 years.

However, the railway's construction has encountered several obstacles throughout construction. Michael Kamau, Kenya's Transport Cabinet Secretary, stated that negotiations with the Chinese had disregarded existing Kenyan procurement laws, and some analysts claim that the bidding process was skewed unfairly towards the current operator, the China Road and Bridge Corporation. Local activists brought the case to the High Court in 2014, and although initially dismissed, a Kenyan court of appeal in 2020 ultimately ruled that the procurement process was illegal, albeit with an unclear impact on future construction. In the investigation, it was revealed that using a Chinese operator over local contractors was stipulated in the conditions of the loan.

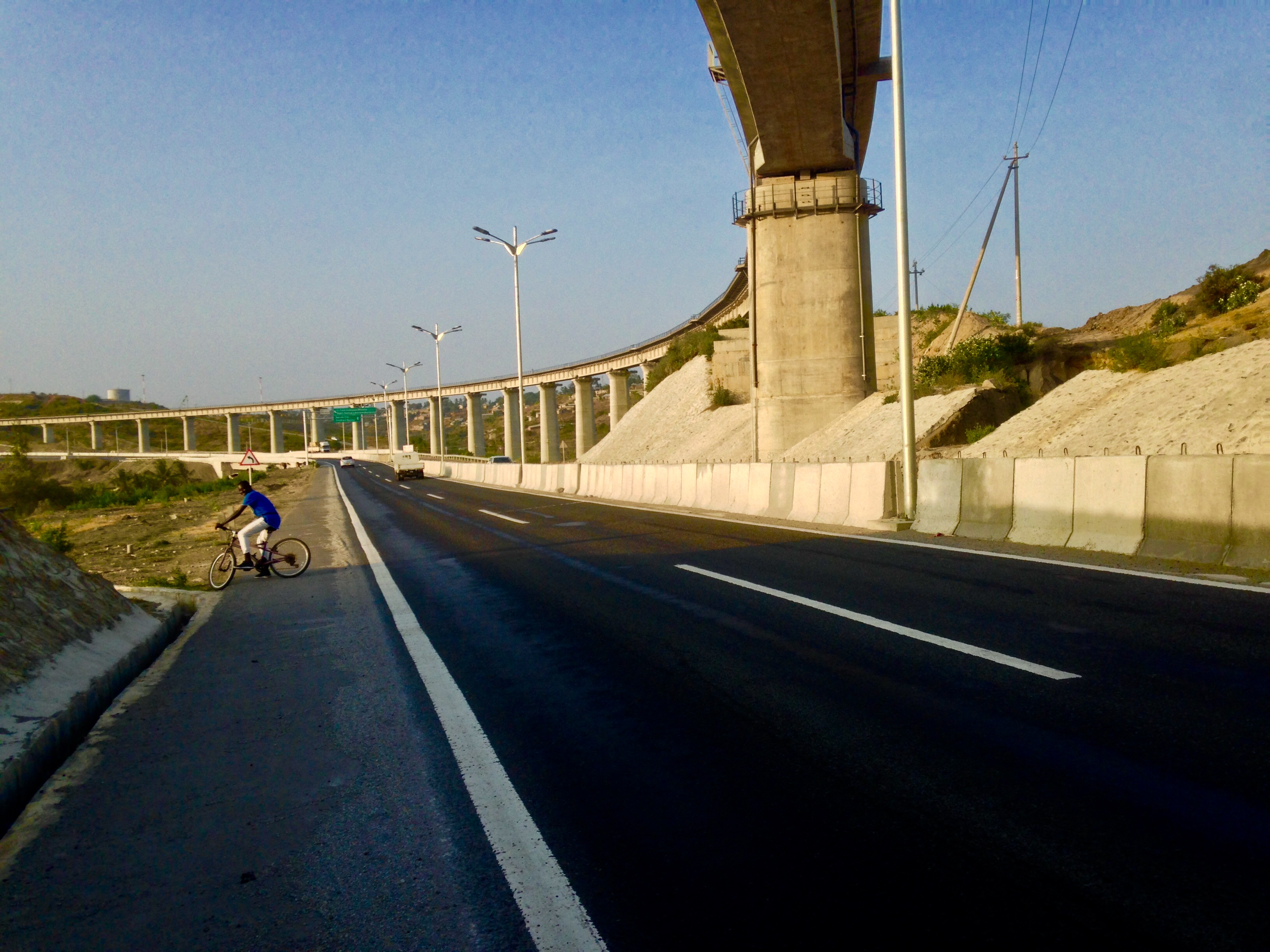
The currently constructed section of Kenya's Standard Gauge Railway.

In 2017, the first section of the railway completed construction, but financial difficulties have only intensified. During construction, Kenya paid around $5.6 million per kilometre of track, four times more than their starting estimates. From 2017 to 2018 the railway was running at a loss of $7.35 million per month due to unexpectedly low usage. In response, the Kenyan government has had to regularly raise prices of the railway, which has in turn reduced usage of the railway in terms of both passengers and cargo. Subsequently, China declined to provide the additional $3.6 billion loan necessary to complete the second section of the railway.

In 2018, a document allegedly leaked from the Auditor-General's office showed that, in order to secure loans related to SGR in 2013, the government had collateralized Kenyan assets to the China Export-Import Bank, including the Mombasa port and Inland Container Depot in Nairobi. If the railway fails to attract a pre-specified quantity of cargo, the contract would allow the China Export-Import Bank to claim the port's sovereignty as principle. While the Auditor-General, Edward Ouko, has declined to confirm or deny the authenticity of the report, the President Uhuru Kenyatta, the national Treasury Cabinet Secretary Ukur Yatani, and Transport and Infrastructure Cabinet Secretary Brian Kamau have all dismissed the report as a fabrication. The authenticity of the document remains unconfirmed, and the National Assembly's Public Investments Committee is currently conducting an investigation into the matter. In addition to the Mombasa port, Kenya could also be made to give China control of the Inland Container Depot in Nairobi.

=== Debt-trap diplomacy criticisms ===
Local news outlets and external analysts have frequently analogized the collateralization of the Mombasa port to the Sri Lankan Hambantota International Port, in which Sri Lanka ceded the port to China in order to repay its loans. This comparison fits into a broader accusation of the PRC's "debt-trap" diplomacy, which some analysts label as a form of neocolonialism. Specifically, the Daily Nation and the Standard, two major Kenyan news companies, have numerous articles centred on the theme of debt-trap diplomacy, and the Kenyan public is generally more critical of Chinese mega-projects than the government. Some critics also posit that it fits into a larger trend of Chinese loans in Africa. For example, Djibouti might also allegedly cede its port to China with its extreme levels of debt, Zambia could similarly cede its national broadcasting network and its Lusaka International Airport, and Tanzania has compounded its already substantial debt to Beijing with the $10 billion needed for the Bagamoyo port.

However, other analysts also emphasize that there is no "one-size-fits-all" understanding of all African countries, pointing to South Africa and Nigeria as examples of countries that successfully leveraged Chinese loans for much-needed infrastructural and economic development. On average, African countries still owe more to multilateral institutions such as the World Bank and IMF than China, and debt owed to more Western-oriented institutions has existed for far longer and has had similar levels of debt and resource exploitation. A 2023 blog post from Brookings examines the impact of Chinese foreign aid on recipient countries based on a meta-regression analysis of 1,149 estimates from 29 studies. It finds that Chinese aid has a small, heterogeneous effect on development outcomes, with a slight positive impact on economic growth, somewhat consistent with the claim that Chinese government-financed transport projects contribute to closing developing countries' infrastructure gaps, but slight negative correlations with deforestation and public perception of China. Both Chinese and OECD aid show a slight positive impact on economic outcomes, suggesting that infrastructure projects funded by both contribute to development, though the effect is small. However, Chinese aid differs in its association with negative perceptions of China and adverse environmental impacts, such as deforestation, contrasting with the more positive soft power effects and mixed environmental results of OECD aid. Neither form of aid robustly affects governance or social outcomes, and Chinese aid does not significantly influence conflict or stability, unlike some findings on Western aid. The heterogeneity in Chinese aid's impact is influenced by the type of development outcome measured, variations in aid measurement, different estimation methods, geographic regions, and author affiliations, highlighting the complexity of assessing aid effectiveness across diverse contexts.

Ian Taylor, co-editor of the Journal of Modern African Studies, highlights that sovereign guarantees are not unusual in other bilateral financial institutions, and posits that an actual takeover of the Kenyan port seems unlikely, since China would be wary to take over a financially "loss-making enterprise" as well as compromise its international reputation. Maddalena Procopio, another analyst on China-Africa relations, cautions against overly dismissing Kenyan agency in negotiations, and emphasizes that the Kenyan government has itself actively sought and initiated these BRI projects as well as historically pushed back against disadvantageous Chinese investments.

In 2018, Kenyan President Uhuru Kenyatta banned Chinese fish imports in response to public outcry over the unregulated importation of fish from China with Kenyan fishermen lamenting on how the foreign fish had flooded markets. In response, the Chinese government threatened to completely pull funding for the SGR project as well as to impose trade sanctions. The Kenyan government soon after lifted the ban of Chinese fish imports, which attracted further criticism of debt-diplomacy from local media.

In February 2021, China postponed $245 million of Kenyan debt repayments for 6 months, a week after the Paris Club had offered similar relief, as the country struggles with the economic impact of COVID-19.

=== Chinese development finance to Kenya ===
From 2000 to 2011, there are approximately 65 Chinese official development finance projects identified in Kenya through various media reports. These projects range from a US$108 million grant from Chinese government to build the North and East Ring Road sections in Nairobi, to a concessional loan to finance the construction of the Kenyatta University Teaching, Research and Referral Hospital Project in 2011.

== Political relations ==
Kenya follows the one China principle. It recognizes the People's Republic of China as the sole government of China and Taiwan as an integral part of China's territory, and supports all efforts by the PRC to "achieve national reunification". It also considers Hong Kong, Xinjiang and Tibet to be China's internal affairs.

== Controversies ==
=== Cut-throat competition ===
On February 28, 2023, over a thousand protesters, mainly local traders, flooded into the capital Nairobi. The protesters demanded that the Chinese retailers from the "China Square" be driven out of Kenya. This is due to the Chinese retailers in China Square charging an average price that is nearly half of that of local merchants, which has hugely impacted local businesses.

=== Job scams ===
There have been reports concerning Kenyans being lured by overseas job opportunities advertisements. However, these job opportunities are not as advertised, often involving scamming for Chinese scam gangs. The refusal to work for these Chinese scam gangs frequently leads to physical assaults and attacks by the gangs. The work environment is also inhumane: these forced labourers often do not receive their promised payment and can be threatened with sex work or organ harvesting if they fail to reach the work target (lure enough victims). Some Kenyan businesses have also become victims of such fake job advertisements. For instance, some Chinese-owned scam centres use Kenya Railways as a disguise for their fake job advertisement, and Kenyans who apply for these jobs often find themselves being forced to work for the scammers.

=== The unfinished work ===
China's "One Belt, One Road" initiative has led to many ongoing infrastructure projects in Kenya. These projects began with a reciprocal nature. However, these projects are backed up by collateral commitments to the Chinese government, and the project delivery is often on China's terms. Over the years, these projects have been brought to a halt, especially after China cut its financial aid to Kenya. The promised result of creating local job opportunities has not yet been realised, leading Kenya to seek other sources of cooperation to complete these projects.

== Educational exchanges ==
In 2001, the first Confucius Institute in Africa opened as a collaboration between Kenya's University of Nairobi and China's Tianjin Normal University.

== Public opinion ==
A survey published in 2026 by the Pew Research Center found that 76% of Kenyans had a favorable view of China, while 20% had an unfavorable view.

== Resident diplomatic missions ==
of China in Kenya

- Nairobi (Embassy)

of Kenya in China

- Beijing (Embassy)
- Guangzhou (Consulate-General)

== See also ==
- China-Africa relations
- Chinese people in Kenya
