= Michael Kamau =

Kenyan civil servant

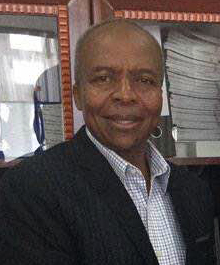

Cabinet Secretary for Transport and Infrastructure (suspended)
- In office 15 May 2013 – 28 March 2015
- President: Uhuru Kenyatta
- Succeeded by: James macharia

Permanent Secretary at the Ministry of Roads
- In office October 2007 – May 2013
- President: Mwai Kibaki
- Succeeded by: Nduva Muli

Personal details
- Born: 19 September 1958 (age 68) Nyeri, British Kenya
- Children: 2
- Education: University of Nairobi (BSc); Newcastle University (MSc)
- Profession: Engineer

Michael Kamau (born 1958) is a Kenyan civil servant who was nominated by President Uhuru Kenyatta as Cabinet Secretary for Transport and Infrastructure on 25 April 2013. He was suspended from the Cabinet on 28 March 2015 on allegations of corruption and charged in court with abuse of office on 4 June 2015. He was replaced by James Macharia in an acting capacity.
