= Kakai Kissinger =

Kenyan human rights activist and attorney

Francis Kakai Kissinger
- Born: Kakai Kissinger; 21 July 1971 (age 54); Kiminini, Kenya
- Education: Friends School Kamusinga; Musingu High School
- Alma mater: University of Nairobi; University of Turin Department of Law; Harvard Law School
- Occupations: Lawyer; Activist; Election Observer

Kakai Kissinger (born Kakai Francis Kissinger; July 21, 1975) is a Kenyan human rights activist and attorney. Trained in international trade law at the University of Turin, Faculty of Law, in Italy (2003), he received further training in 2007 in human rights and constitutional law at Harvard Law School in the US.

== Early life and education ==
Kissinger was born in Kiminini within the Trans-Nzoia County in the vast Rift Valley Province of Kenya. He was named Kissinger by his mother after the former United States secretary of state, Henry Kissinger.

Kissinger was schooled at Nzoia Sugar Company Primary School and Lugulu Boarding Primary School for his primary education. He then proceeded to Friends School Kamusinga and later Musingu High School both schools in the then Western Province for his high school education. Later on, he joined the University of Nairobi in 1995 and attained a bachelor's degree in law (LL.B) in 1999. In 2003, he won an academic scholarship to pursue postgraduate studies in international trade law in Italy from the ITCILO, sponsored by the International Labour Organization. In 2006, he was awarded a Ford Foundation Scholarship to undertake studies at Harvard University due to his engagements as a human rights activist and attorney. At the time, Kissinger was the executive director of a Kenyan non-governmental organization, Independent Medico-Legal Unit.

== Career ==
=== Legal ===
Kissinger is an advocate of the High Court of Kenya with a specialty in international human rights and constitutional law. He has held senior positions before with the German Technical Cooperation (giz) as senior governance advisor, as executive director of Independent Medico Legal Unit (IMLU), a leading human rights organization in Kenya.

==== Private practise ====
Kissinger is the proprietor of Kakai Mugalo & Company, and advocates in Nairobi, Kenya. He is interested in leadership in Kenya and has a close working relationship with his native rural area and constituency where he collaborates with local civil society organizations, church groups, youth groups and community-based organizations in all aspects of empowerment and development. He is a current board member of two Kenyan civil society organizations, the Independent Medico Legal Unit and Empower/Wezesha.

==== Judiciary of Kenya ====
Upon the establishment of the Supreme Court of Kenya in 2011, Kakai was appointed the deputy chief registrar of the Judiciary. On October 24, 2013, he was appointed chief registrar in an acting capacity following the removal of the then Chief Registrar, Gladys Boss Shollei.

==== Consultation and election observer ====
Kakai Kissinger widely consults for the African Union as an elections consultant. He has been hired in the past to manage and coordinate election observation missions on behalf of the African Union (AU) in the 2015 Ethiopian general election, 2016 Zambian general election, 2016 Ugandan general election, 2017 Liberian general election, 2018 Zimbabwean general election and 2019 Botswana general election. He is also an AU trainer for AU recruited election observers.

He has also consulted for the German Technical Cooperation (giz) on Governance issues in Hargeisa, for East African Community (EAC) on election related matters, and for some Kenyan Government agencies on a wide range of topics.

==== University lecturer ====
Kakai Kissinger has taught law at the Catholic University of Eastern Africa and Kenya School of Law.

== Philanthropy ==
Kakai Kissinger established the Kakai Kissinger foundation, where he plans to participate in philanthropic work and concentrate more in his native constituency. Through the foundation, he intends to recognize and award academic scholarships to bright and needy students from his former school, Friends School Kamusinga.
