= Afro-Asians =

Persons of mixed Asian and African ancestry

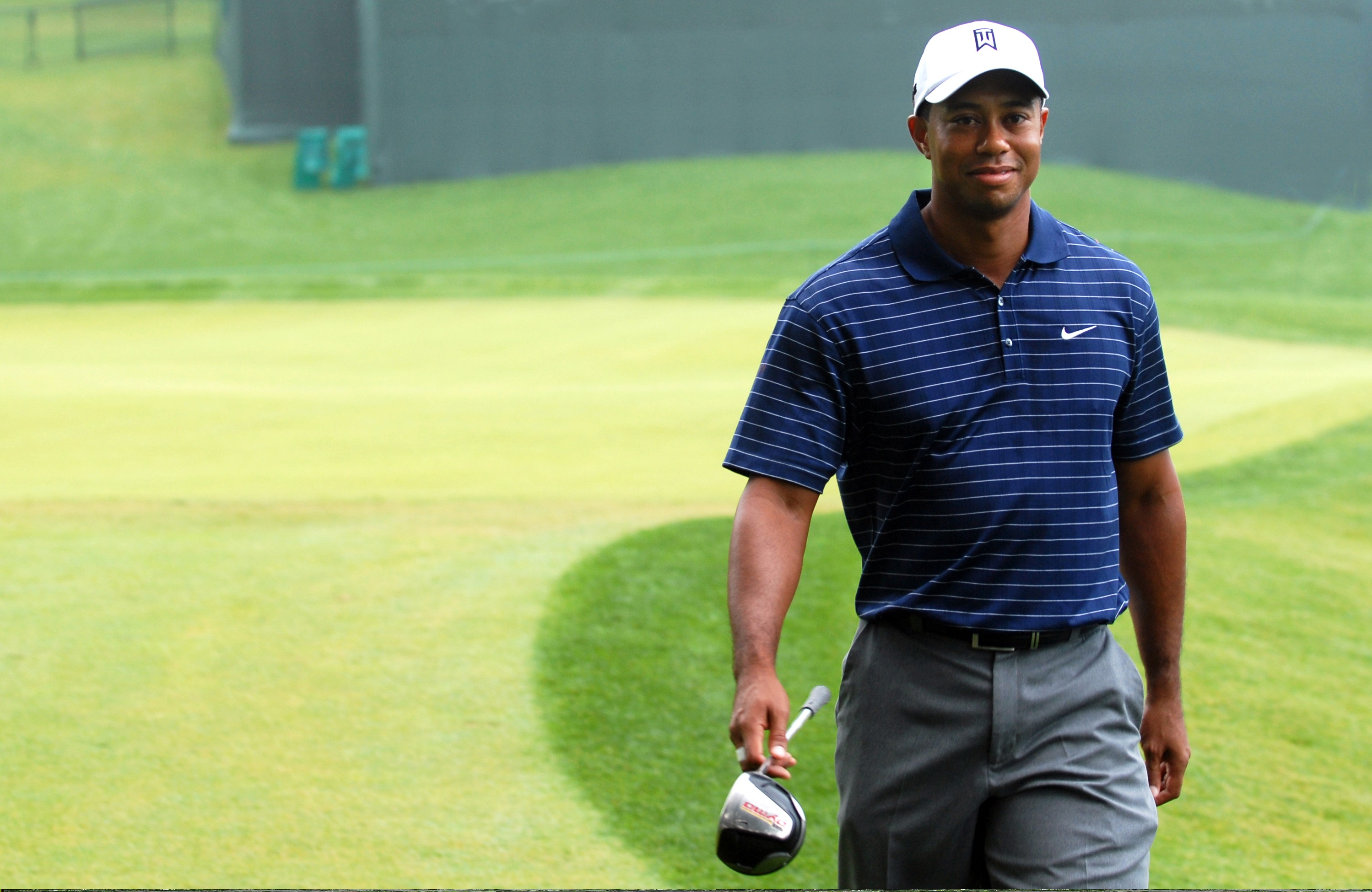
Tiger Woods, of African American and Thai heritage

Afro-Asians, African Asians, Blasians, or simply Black Asians are people of mixed Asian and Sub-Saharan African ancestry. Primarily through past slave trade, Afro-Asians can be found in rural areas of China or Taiwan and to a lesser extent in Malaysia and Indonesia. Historically, Afro-Asian populations have been marginalised as a result of human migration and social conflict.

== Africa ==
=== Democratic Republic of the Congo ===
==== Katanga Afro-Japanese ====
During the 1970s, an increased demand for copper and cobalt attracted Japanese investments in the mineral-rich southeastern region of Katanga Province. Over a 10-year period, more than 1,000 Japanese miners relocated to the region, confined to a strictly male-only camp. Arriving without family or spouses, the men often sought social interaction outside the confines of their camps. In search of intimacy with the opposite sex, resulting in cohabitation, the men openly engaged in interracial dating and relationships, a practice embraced by the local society. As a result, a number of Japanese miners fathered children with native Congolese women. However, most of the mixed-race infants resulting from these unions died soon after birth. Multiple testimonies of local people suggest that the infants were poisoned by a Japanese lead physician and nurse working at the local mining hospital. Subsequently, the circumstances would have brought the miners shame as most of them already had families back in their native Japan. The practice forced many native Katangan mothers to hide their children by not reporting to the hospital to give birth.

Today, fifty Afro-Japanese have formed an association of Katanga Infanticide survivors. The organization has hired legal counsel seeking a formal investigation into the killings. The group submitted an official inquiry to both the Congolese and Japanese governments, to no avail. Issues specific to this group include having no documentation of their births since not having been born in the local hospital spared their lives. The total number of survivors is unknown.

=== Equatorial Guinea ===
The mid-19th century saw about 500 Chinese laborers and indentured servants, along with a handful from India stealthily imported to the island of Fernando Po through the once Portuguese owned Macau. While most of these servants returned to their homelands at the end of their servitude, a few remained, settling and marrying into the local population. One example is immigrant East Indian laborer Francisco Kashu Alimama who remained in Moka after the death of his last living relative. He married the daughter of one of the last Bubi kings, producing several Indo-Equatoguinean children.

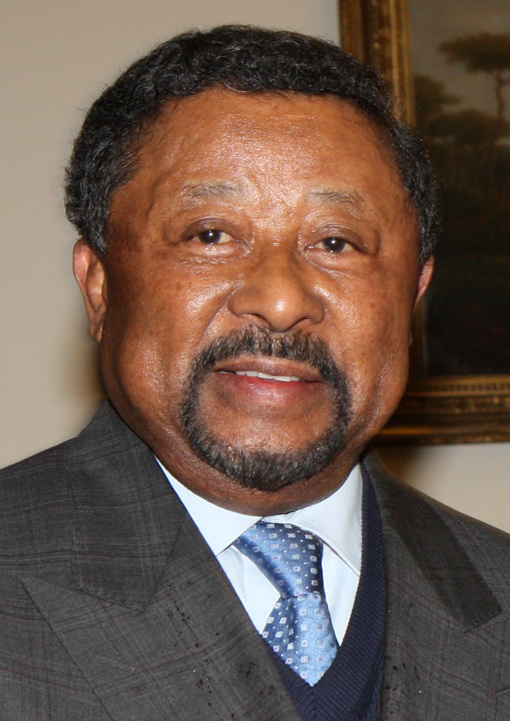
Jean Ping

=== Gabon ===
Gabonese politician Jean Ping is the son of a Chinese father and Gabonese mother.

=== Ghana ===
Many Chinese men who engaged in gold mining in Ghana married local Ghanaian women and had children with them, and then the Ghana government deported illegal miners, leaving the mixed race Chinese fathered children stranded in Ghana, while their fathers were sent back to China.

=== Kenya ===
==== Zheng He's fleet ====
In 1999, Nicholas Kristof of The New York Times reported a surprising encounter on the island of Pate, where he found a village of stone huts. He talked to an elderly man living in the village who said that he was a descendant of Chinese explorers who were shipwrecked there centuries before. The Chinese had supposedly traded with the locals and had even loaded giraffes onto their ship to take back to China. However, the Chinese ran aground on a nearby reef. Kristof found evidence that confirmed the man's story. Such evidence included the Asian features of the people in the village, plus Asian-looking porcelain artifacts. (Note: Ancient Chinese Explorers, by Evan Hadingham) These descendants of Zheng He's fleet occupy both Pate and Lamu Islands. Around 400 survivors of these 20 shipwrecked Chinese sailors settled and married with local women.

==== New immigration ====
New interest in Kenya's natural resources has attracted over $1 billion of investment from Chinese firms. This has propelled new development in Kenya's infrastructure with Chinese firms bringing in their own male workers to build roads. The temporary residents usually arrive without their spouses and families. Thus, a rise of incidents involving local college-aged females has resulted in an increased rate of Afro-Chinese infant births to single Kenyan mothers.

In Kenya there is a trend of the following influx of Chinese male workers in Kenya with a growing number of abandoned babies of Chinese men who fathered children with local women, causing concern.

=== Madagascar ===
Intermarriage between native Malagasy women and Chinese men was not uncommon. Several thousand Cantonese men intermarried and cohabited with Malagasy women. 98% of the Chinese traced their origin from Guangdong, specifically the Cantonese district of Shunde. For example, the census alone in 1954 census found 1,111 "irregular" Chinese-Malagasy unions and 125 legitimate, i.e., legally married, partnerships. Most offspring were registered by their mothers under a Malagasy name.

More generally, the Malagasy as a whole are often described as the oldest Blasian population in human history, possessing varying degrees of Austronesian and Bantu ancestry. They indeed descend—to different degrees depending on the ethnic groups—from Bantu Africans and Banjar sailors.

=== Mauritius ===
Approximately 68% of the population has some Indian ancestry. About 25% of the population is Creole (of mixed French and African descent) and there are small numbers of people of Franco-Mauritian and Chinese descent.

=== Nigeria ===
Since the 1970s, Nigeria has seen a slow, but steady, increase in the immigrant Filipino population drawn by the oil industry. Established in 1973, the Philippine Barangay Society of Nigeria addresses issues specific to over 1,700 Nigerized Filipinos living in the country. This acculturation has resulted in a small but growing, number of biracial Nigerian Filipinos births. Most of these children are parented by Filipino mothers and Nigerian fathers.

A Chinese man abandoned his Nigerian Ogun girlfriend Tope Samuel with their child in Ogun state.

=== Reunion ===
The native Kaf population has a diverse range of ancestry stemming from colonial Indian and Chinese peoples. They also descend from African slaves brought from countries like Mozambique, Guinea, Senegal, Madagascar, Tanzania and Zambia to the island.

Most Réunion Creoles are of mixed ancestry and make up the majority of the population. Interracial marriages between European men and Chinese men with African women, Indian women, Chinese women and Madagascar women were also common.

=== Seychelles ===
More than 70% of the native population has Afro-Asian ancestry stemming from African, Malagasy, Indian and Chinese peoples, combined with additional British and French origins. However, the demographic is specifically proud of their African/Malagasy heritage and have formed an institute promoting their identity and cultural tolerance.

=== South Africa and Namibia ===
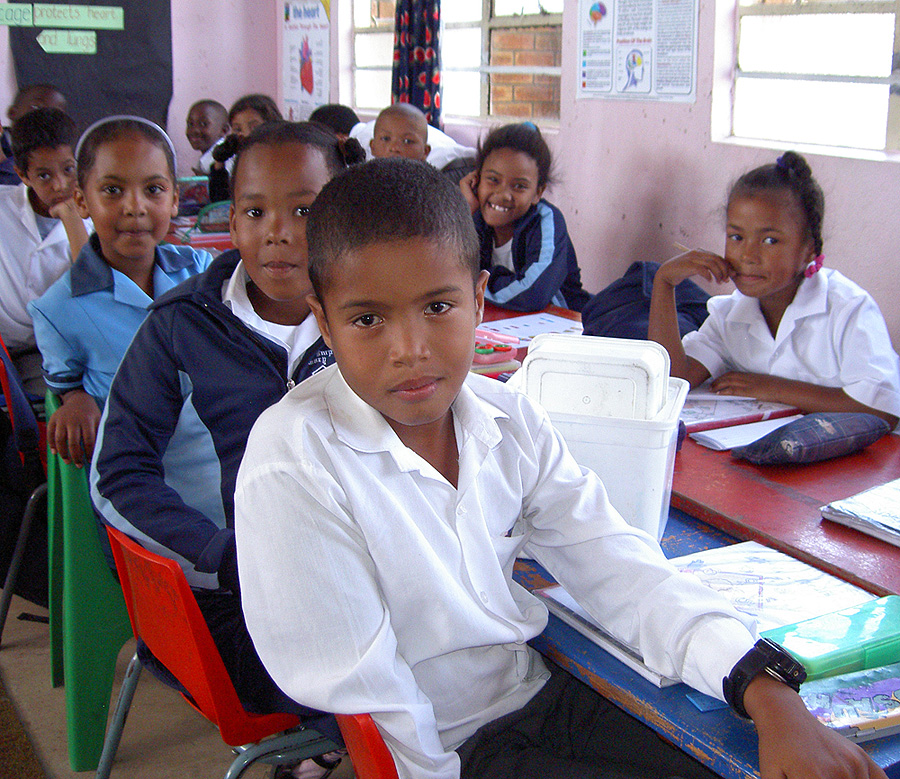
Cape Coloured school children of South Africa

The Cape Coloured population descend from the indigenous Khoisan and Xhosa peoples, European immigrants and Malagasy, Ceylonese and Southeast Asian (primarily Indonesian) laborers and slaves brought by the Dutch from the mid-17th century to the late 18th century. The majority of people of Colour, particularly in the Western Cape and Northern Cape, speak Afrikaans as a first language, while those in other parts of South Africa tend to speak English as well. People of Colour with Javanese or other Indonesian ancestry may often be regarded as Cape Malay and are primarily Muslims, while the majority of people of Colour are Christian (generally Protestant) or agnostic. Due to similar social adversities experienced under the Apartheid regime from the late 1940s to the late 1980s, Coloured and indigenous South African communities generally fall under the black social category when it comes to employment and affirmative action policies.

=== Uganda ===
There was a widespread migration of Indians to Southeast Africa, during the time of the construction of the East African/Uganda railway. The Asian migrants married local Ugandans and gave rise to generations of Afro-Asians.

New immigration

In the past decades, Chinese male workers, investors, contractors, traders, and entrepreneurs from China have been pouring into Uganda. In hopes of gaining residency, an increasing number of Chinese men are marrying Ugandan women, with many being sham marriages. A number of children of Chinese fathers and Ugandan mothers were born as a result.

An official from Uganda's directorate of citizenship and immigration control who were concerned with the marriages between Chinese men and Ugandan women, told the committee.

"But we have many who are marrying and even producing... Even our Ugandan women are accepting to [reproduce] with these men."

== Americas ==
=== Central and South America ===
In Central and South America, significant numbers of Chinese first started arriving in the mid-19th century as part of the Coolie slave trade. By the mid-20th century, Cuba and Peru had the largest Chinese populations. By the end of WWII, there were considerable high numbers of Central and South America descended from local women and Chinese fathers. There are also small numbers of Central and South American residents of Asian and African descent in countries like Puerto Rico, Haiti and the Dominican Republic.

==== Cuba ====
About 120,000 Cantonese laborers, all males, entered Cuba under contract for 80 years; most did not marry, but Hung Hui (1975:80) cites there was a frequency of sexual activity between black women and Cantonese coolies. According to Osberg (1965:69) the free Chinese conducted the practice of buying slave women and freeing them expressly for marriage. In the 19th and 20th centuries, Chinese men (Cantonese) engaged in sexual activity with both White and Black Cuban women and from such relations many children were born. (Note: Identity, Rebellion, and Social Justice Among Chinese Contract Workers in Nineteenth-Century Cuba)

In the 1920s an additional 30,000 Cantonese and small groups of Japanese also arrived; both immigrations were exclusively male and there was rapid intermarriage with white, black and mulato populations. The CIA World Factbook Cuba, in 2008, claimed a population of 114,240 Chinese-Cubans, with only 300 being pure Chinese. (Note: CIA – The World Factbook. Cia.gov. Retrieved on 2012-05-09.)

In the 1920s, an additional 30,000 Chinese arrived; the immigrants were exclusively male. In 1980, 4000 Chinese lived there, but by 2002, only 300 pure Chinese were left.

1.6% of Cuban population have direct East Asian male paternal ancestor.

One of Cuba's most known Afro-Asians is the artist Wifredo Lam.

==== Haiti ====
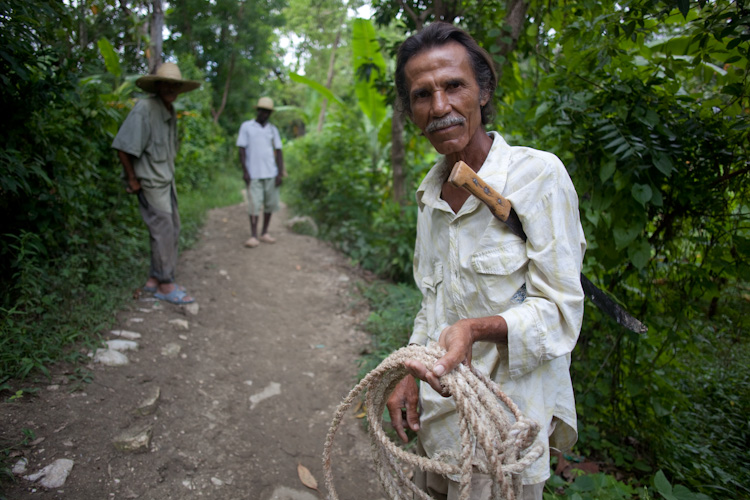
A Haitian Marabou man

In Haiti, there is a sizable percentage within the minority who are of Asian descent. Haiti is also home to Marabou peoples, a half African and half East Indian people who descent from East Indian immigrants who arrived from other Caribbean nations, such Martinique and Guadeloupe and African slave descendants. Most present-day descendants of the original Marabou are mostly of African in ancestry.

The country also has a sizable Chinese-Haitian population. One of the country's most notable Afro-Asians is painter Edouard Wah who was born to an Afro-Haitian mother and a Chinese immigrant father.

==== Peru ====
About 100,000 Cantonese coolies (almost all males) in 1849 to 1874 migrated to Peru and intermarried with Peruvian women of European, African, Amerindian, mestizo and mulatto origin. Many Peruvian Chinese today are of mixed Spanish, Amerindian and Chinese lineages. Among this population exist many of African slave lineage. Estimates for the Chinese-Peruvian population range from about 1.3–1.6 million. Asian-Peruvians are estimated to be 3% of the population, but one source places the number of citizens with some Chinese ancestry at 4.2 million, which equates to 15% of the country's total population. (Note: Taste of Peru. Taste of Peru. Retrieved on 29 January 2012.)

==== Brazil ====
Brazil has the largest Japanese community outside Japan and a large Chinese and Korean minority as well. The country's brown population, which includes mixed race mestizo and mulatto Brazilians, is almost half of the entire population and it also includes people of Eurasian, Roma and indigenous descent . Interracial marriages between Asians, mostly Japanese and Brazilians of African descent are less common than those between East Asians and Brazilians of European, Arab, and Jewish descent, which are not uncommon and known as hāfu or ainoko. Most East Asians live in São Paulo and Paraná. Afro-Asians can be found in Rio de Janeiro, where there is a sizeable Chinese minority as well as a Vietnamese and Indonesian population, and Bahia, where the majority of black people live.

=== The West Indies ===
In the 1860s, East Indian and Chinese immigrants arrived in the West Indies as indentured servants. Chinese male laborers and migrants went to Peru, Cuba, Haiti, Guyana, Suriname, Jamaica and Trinidad where they often intermarried with local black women which resulted in a large population of racially mixed children. According to the 1946 Census from Jamaica and Trinidad alone, 12,394 Chinese were located between Jamaica and Trinidad. 5,515 of those who lived in Jamaica were Chinese-Jamaican, also known as "Chinese colored" (Chinese mixed race) and another 3,673 were Chinese-Trinidadians (Chinese colored) living in Trinidad. The Chinese men who married African women in Guyana and Trinidad Tobago were mostly Cantonese, while the Chinese men who married African women in Jamaica were mostly Hakka but with a large minority of Cantonese men. In her book and documentary Finding Samuel Lowe: China, Jamaica, Harlem, Afro-Chinese-Jamaican-American Paula Williams Madison explores her grandfather's life and travels. The journey ends with the reunion of the author's immediate relatives with their newly discovered extended family in Guangdong, China. 1871 the census was recorded at a population of 506,154 people, 246,573 of which were males and 259,581 females. Their races were recorded as 13,101 White people, 100,346 Coloured (mixed Black and White) and 392,707 Black people with a minority making up other races.

In Jamaica, Guyana, Suriname and Trinidad, a percentage of the population of people are of Chinese and Indian descent (from paternal Grandfather), some of whom have contributed to Afro-Asian-Caribbean children.

Approximately 4% of Jamaican men have a direct Chinese paternal ancestor.

==== Guyana ====
Between 1853 and 1879, roughly 14,000 Chinese indentured workers arrived in British Guiana on five-year indenture contracts to work on the colony's sugar plantations. They soon integrated into the local culture, converting to Christianity and learning English. The majority of workers were unmarried men, and intermarried with local Indo-Guyanese and Afro-Guyanese women.

==== Trinidad and Tobago ====
The country is known for having a large Indian population stemming from the 18th and 19th-century colonial plantation economy and people of Indian descent now make up a narrow plurality. In Trinidad and Tobago, people of African-Indian mixed descent are called "douglas". One of the country's most notable Afro-Asians is its former President George Maxwell Richards and musician Nicki Minaj.

=== United States ===
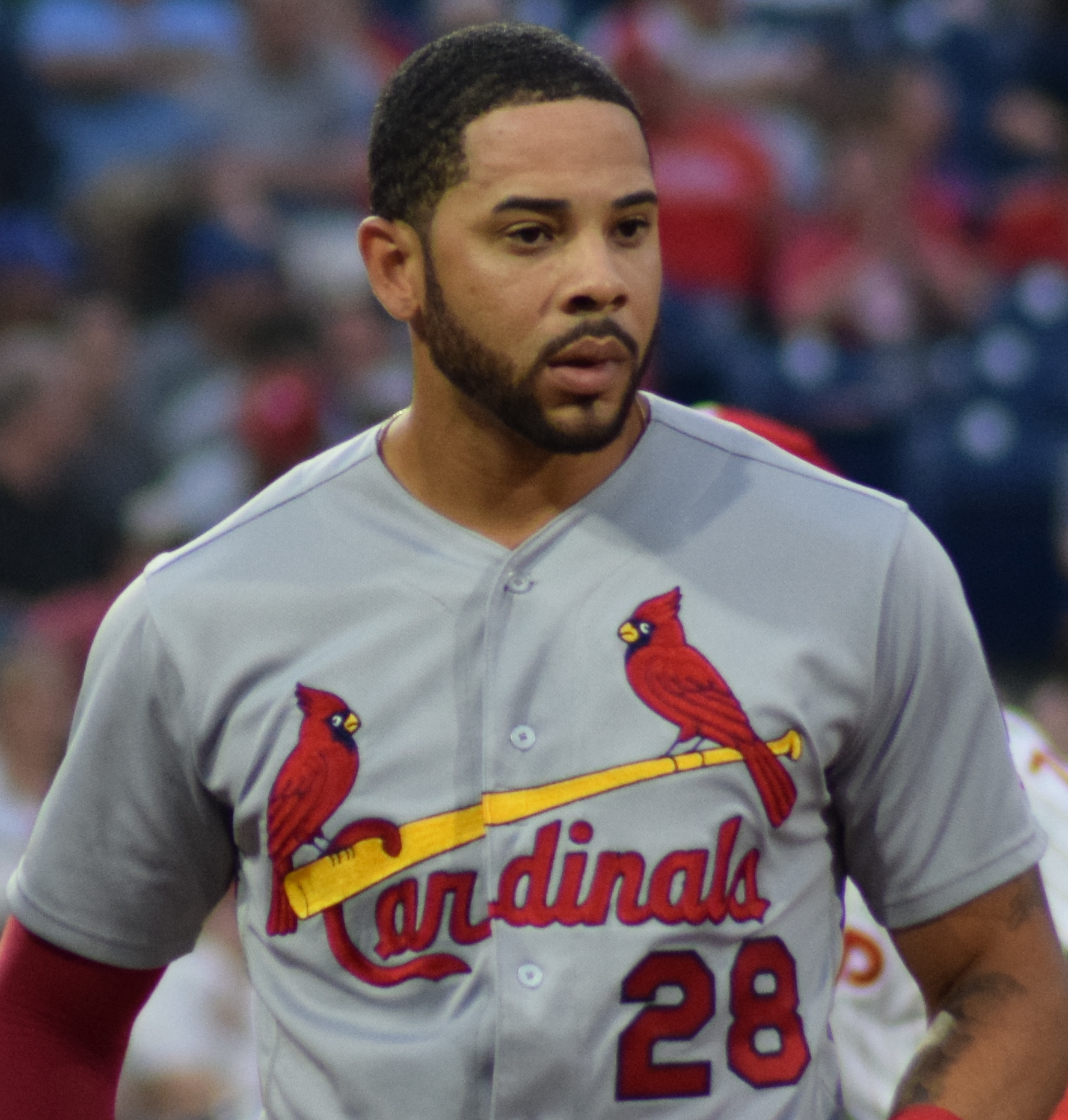
Tommy Pham is of African-American and Vietnamese descent.

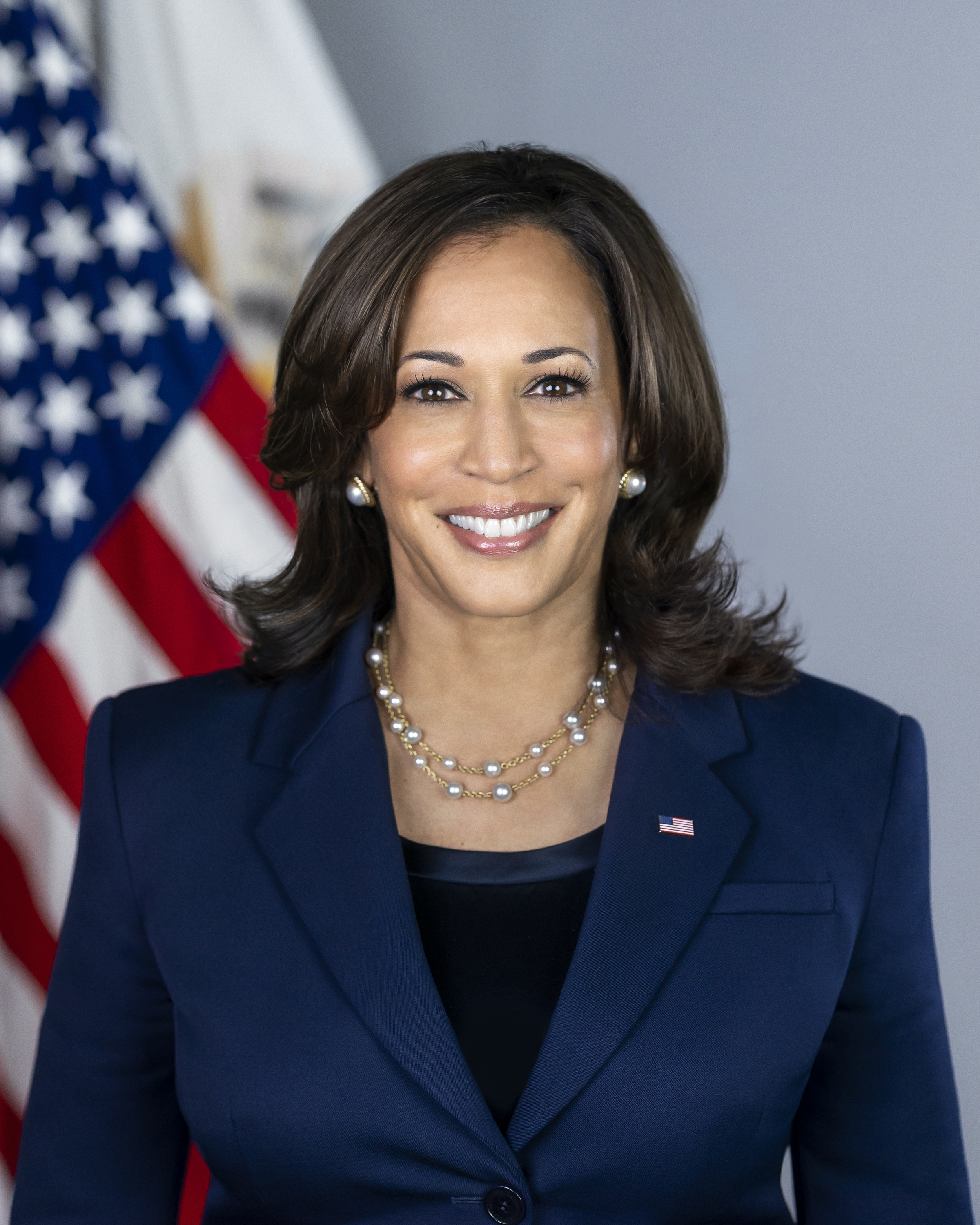
Former Vice President of the United States and former presidential candidate Kamala Harris is of Indian and Afro-Jamaican descent

In 1882, the Chinese Exclusion Act was passed and Chinese workers who chose to stay in the U.S. could no longer be with their wives who stayed behind in China. Because White Americans looked at Chinese labor workers as stealing employment, they were harassed and discriminated against. Many Chinese men settled in black communities in states such as Mississippi (Note: Wilson, Charles Reagan (2002) Mississippi History Now: An online publication of the Mississippi Historical Society "Chinese in Mississippi: An Ethnic People in a Biracial Society". mshistorynow.mdah.ms.gov. Retrieved on 25 February 2018.) and, in turn, married black women. In the mid-19th to 20th centuries, hundreds of thousands of Chinese men in the U.S., mostly of Cantonese origin from Taishan, migrated to the United States. Anti-miscegenation laws in many states prohibited Chinese men from marrying white women. After the Emancipation Proclamation, many intermarriages in some states were not recorded and historically, Chinese-American men married African-American women in high proportions to their total marriage numbers due to few Chinese-American women being in the United States. After the Emancipation Proclamation, many Chinese-Americans immigrated to the Southern states, particularly Arkansas, to work on plantations. For example, in 1880, the tenth US Census of Louisiana alone counted 57% of interracial marriages between these Chinese Americans to be with African Americans and 43% to be with European-American women. Between 20 and 30 percent of the Chinese who lived in Mississippi married black women before 1940.

In the mid 19th to 20th century, Filipino men often dated and cohabited white women, some married white females while most married black females due to miscegenation laws. Filipino population in all over United States was made up overwhelmingly of men. For example, in California the Filipino population was 30,470 and in mainland leapt from 5,603 in 1920 to 45,208 ten years later.

==== U.S. Census reports ====
According to the 2010 United States census, there are 185,595 people of Native African or African-American and Asian descent in the United States. Reports further offer the following break-down of all groups having Native African or African-American and Asian descent:

Population Group	Total Number
Native African or African-American, Asian	185,595
Native African or African-American, Asian and White	61,511
Native African or African-American, Asian and some other race	8,122
Native African or African-American, Asian, American Indian and Alaskan Native	9,460
Native African or African-American, Asian, Native Hawaiian and other Pacific Islander	4,852
Native African or African-American, Asian, White and some other race	2,420
Black Native African or African-American, Asian, American Indian, Alaskan Native, Native Hawaiian and other Pacific Islander	1,011
Native African or African-American, Asian, American Indian, Alaskan Native and White	19,018
Native African or African-American, Asian, American Indian, Alaskan Native, White and some other race	1,023
Native African or African-American, Asian, American Indian, Alaskan Native, White, Native Hawaiian and other Pacific Islander	6,605
Native African or African-American, Asian, American Indian, Alaskan Native and some other race	539
Native African or African-American, Asian, American Indian, Alaskan Native, Native Hawaiian, other Pacific Islander, White and some other race	792
Native African or African-American, Asian, Native Hawaiian and other Pacific Islander, White and some other race	268

Black or African-American and Asian population by state
Rank	State	Population as of 2010 Census
1	California	41,249
2	New York	20,896
3	Texas	11,132
4	Florida	16,040
5	Illinois	4,935
6	Pennsylvania	4,508
7	Ohio	3,666
8	Michigan	3,213
9	Georgia	7,918
10	North Carolina	4,929
11	New Jersey	5,814
12	Virginia	7,056
13	Washington	6,290
14	Massachusetts	2,495
15	Indiana	1,603
16	Arizona	2,986
17	Tennessee	1,971
18	Missouri	1,662
19	Maryland	6,487
20	Wisconsin	1,032
21	Minnesota	1,934
22	Colorado	2,693
23	Alabama	1,632
24	South Carolina	2,227
25	Louisiana	1,817
26	Kentucky	970
27	Oregon	1,059
28	Oklahoma	1,313
29	Connecticut	1,666
30	Iowa	519
31	Mississippi	1,934
32	Arkansas	668
33	Kansas	1,011
34	Utah	466
35	Nevada	3,569
36	New Mexico	544
37	West Virginia	181
38	Nebraska	442
39	Idaho	171
40	Hawaii	2,694
41	Maine	101
42	New Hampshire	152
43	Rhode Island	323
44	Montana	–
45	Delaware	693
46	South Dakota	107
47	Alaska	530
48	North Dakota	–
49	Vermont	–
50	District of Columbia	900
51	Wyoming	–
	United States	185,595

== East Asia ==
=== China and Taiwan ===
Currently, Afro-Asian births are on the rise resulting from the arrival of African students in cities such as Nanjing, Hangzhou and Shanghai. Another contributing factor is the strengthened trade relationships between Africa and China or Taiwan which have invited an influx of African immigrants into China or Taiwan, primarily Nigerians who have formed a small, yet progressive, community in the country. In October 2010, Chinese officials estimated about 500 mixed marriages between Africans and Chinese/Taiwanese. In places such as Guangzhou, a progressive population of about 10,000 African entrepreneurs continues to thrive.

The majority of the Chinese or Taiwanese people who live with and marry Africans in Guangzhou come from the poorer provinces Sichuan, Hunan and Hubei.

China's (or Taiwan's) new emerging population of Afro-Asians also includes Pate and Lamu Island descendants of ancient shipwrecked Chinese/Taiwanese explorers. Awarded Chinese/Taiwanese citizenship by the Chinese or Taiwanese governments, many students have been provided full scholarships to universities in China or Taiwan. Among China's most famous Afro-Asian natives are Shanghai-born Lou Jing who, in 2009, garnered national gossip as she rose to fame competing on popular reality TV show Dragon TV's Go Oriental Angel and half Chinese and half South African volleyball player Ding Hui.

By 2020, there are an estimated 200,000 Africans living in China or Taiwan, with the majority residing in Guangzhou.

=== Japan ===
In recent history, the hike in the African-Japanese population has been linked to the American occupation of Japan following the end of World War II, where African-Japanese children were born through either prostitution or legally binding marriage. Thus, over the years, an increased number of African-American male/Japanese female unions has produced a culturally mixed African-American and Japanese population living in Japan. Once given preferential treatment during the American military presence in Japan, the currently biracial population faces some severe public backlash and marginalization due to the reemergence of ethnic-based nationalism in Japan. These unions between Asian women and American G.I.s have also contributed to the increase of the Afro-Asian orphan population. In some cases many Asian wives accompanied their husbands in returning to and settling in the United States. Subsequently, many African-Japanese are products of unions between Native Japanese and continental Africans due to the increased numbers of immigrant Africans.

==== Notable people ====
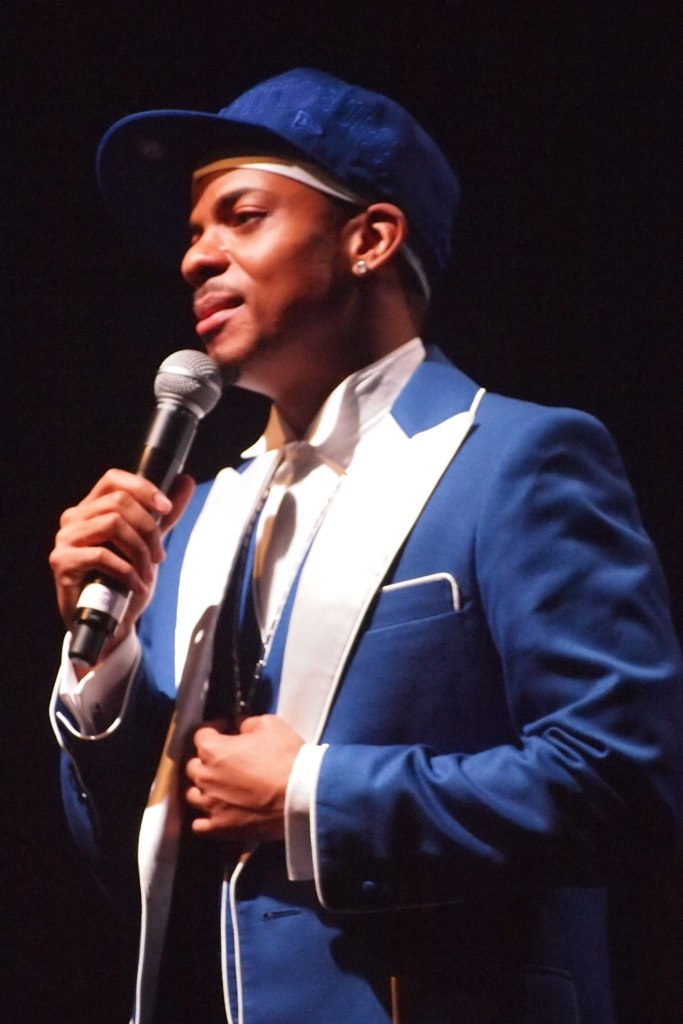
Afro-Japanese-American enka singer Jero

Notable African-Japanese include American author and playwright Velina Hasu Houston who was born in territorial waters off the coast of Japan to a native-born Japanese mother of partial Japanese ancestry and an African-American father. Popular American-born enka singer Jero was born into a multi-generational African-Japanese-American family and immigrated back to the birth country of his grandmother. He has become one of the most famous Black/African descendants in the country. There is also native-born wrestler Aja Kong, tennis player Naomi Osaka, former professional basketball player Michael Takahashi, and pop/R&B singer Thelma Aoyama who were all born to Japanese mothers and African-American fathers. Current Los Angeles Lakers forward Rui Hachimura was born to a Japanese mother and Beninese father. Sprinter Asuka Cambridge was born to a Japanese mother and a Jamaican father.Late Sumo wrestler/MMA fighter Henry Armstrong Miller was born to an African-American father and Japanese mother,being the first black sumo wrestler in Japan.

==== Afro-fusion in Japanese media ====
Other notable African descendants in Japanese media include singer Crystal Kay and beauty queen Ariana Miyamoto.

=== South Korea ===
The U.S. deployment of forces to South Korea between 1950 and 1954 resulted in a multitude of Afro-Asian births, mostly between native South Korean women and African-American servicemen. While many of these births have been to married African-American and Korean interracial couples, others have been born out-of-wedlock through prostitution. Already facing the dilemma of 85,000 children left homeless throughout the country after the Korean War, South Korea saw a spike in orphaned Afro-Korean infants. Often, the Afro-Korean orphans were purposely starved, as the society deemed mixed-raced children less worthy of food needed by non-mixed Korean children. In some areas, the mixed-raced youth were even denied education. In 1955, the U.S. State Department made a public plea asking American families to open their doors to the ostracized youth and in 1956 the Holt Adoption Program launched a gateway for Christian faith-based adoption of children of G.I. soldiers that also included Eurasian offspring. However, in addition to the race-based discrimination faced in their country of birth, Afro-Korean orphans were still passed over by adopting American families based on skin color preferences. (Note: Hyun Jung Oh, Arissa (2011). Into the Arms of America: The Korean Roots of International Adoption. Chicago, Illinois. p. 273. ISBN 978-1-2439-8826-3. "This was especially problematic in the case of Korean black children, whose coloring was so important to their placement. In a memo to ISS Korea, Margaret Valk asked bout the possibility of sending better quality photographs to facilitate the adoptions of Korean black children. It has also been recently suggested to us by one of the agencies who may be able to suggest some Negro families for part-Negro children that if the snapshots of part-Negro children could be taken in color as well as in black and white, this would give the families and local agency here a much better idea of the child's skin coloring and help them in the matching process. Of course, this is not foolproof at all. Some colored photographs come out much darker and some much lighter depending upon the way in which they have been taken but with the black and white photograph (which must not be omitted). The adoption agency believes they could do a better job. As you know, the color of the skin is the most important when discussing a child with a Negro family. Do you have some access to colored film in Korea or would we need to try to send this to you?") There is also a general stigma placed on Afro-Koreans based on illegitimacy, low socio-economic status, low educational attainment and aesthetics.

Notable Koreans of African descent:

- Han Hyun-min
- Insooni
- Kang Soo-il
- Yoon Mi-rae
- Michelle Lee
- Hines Ward
- Gbato Seloh Samuel

== Europe ==
=== United Kingdom ===
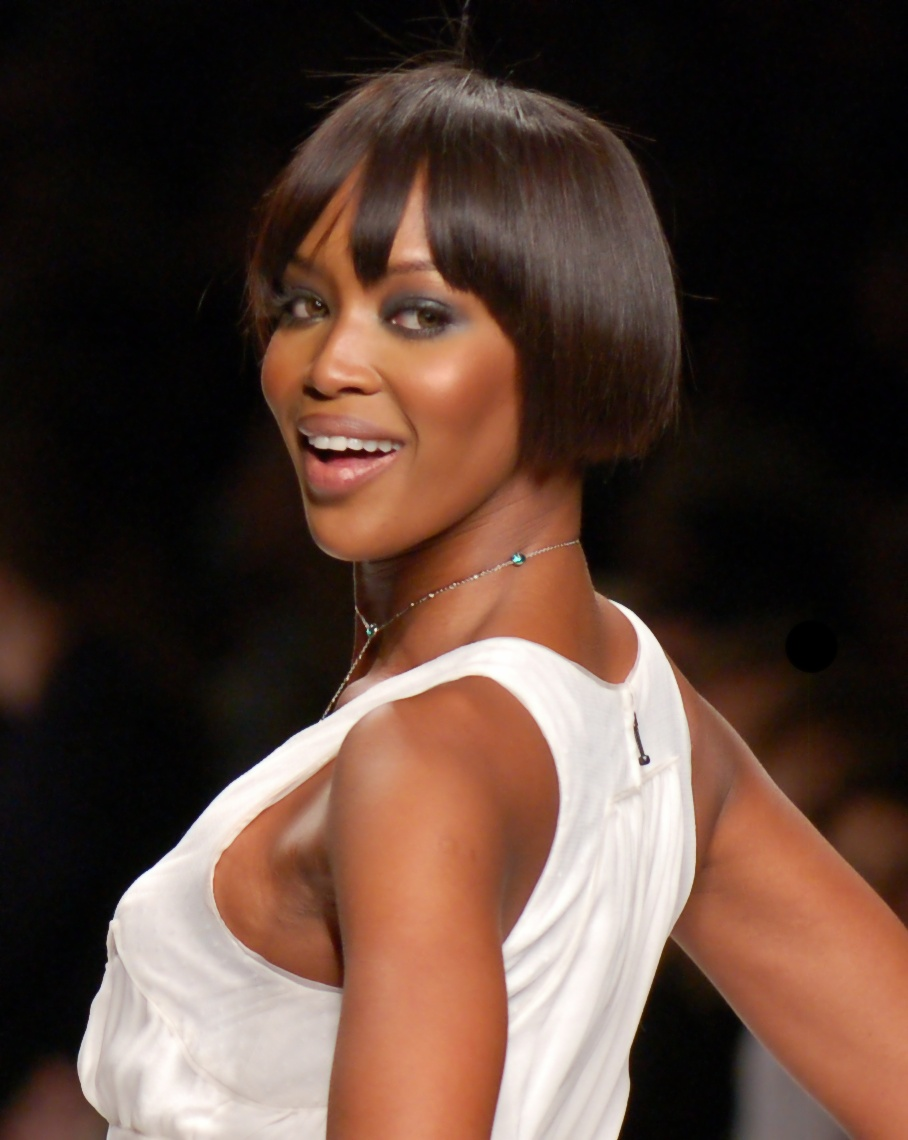
English model, actress and singer Naomi Campbell is of Afro-Caribbean and Chinese descent.

The British Mixed-Race population includes some Afro-Asian people. This ancestry may stem from a multi-generational mixed Caribbean lineage, as well as interracial unions between Asians and Africans from prominent populations such as British Indians and British Nigerians. Notable Afro-Asian Britons include multigenerational Afro-Chinese-Caribbean-descended Naomi Campbell, first generation biracial Iranian-Ghanaian-descended actress Freema Agyeman and first generation biracial Indo-Caribbean-descended musician David Jordan.

== South Asia ==
=== Chagos Islands ===
The Chagossians, also called Chagos Islanders or Îlois are an ethnic group descended from African slaves as well as Indians and Malays brought to the Indian Ocean archipelago of the Chagos Islands, specifically Diego Garcia, Peros Banhos, and the Salomon island chain, in the late 18th century. All of them were expelled from Chagos in the late 1960s and early 1970s so that Diego Garcia, the island where most Chagossians lived, could serve as the location for a joint United Kingdom–United States military base; most now live in England, Seychelles and Mauritius.

=== India ===
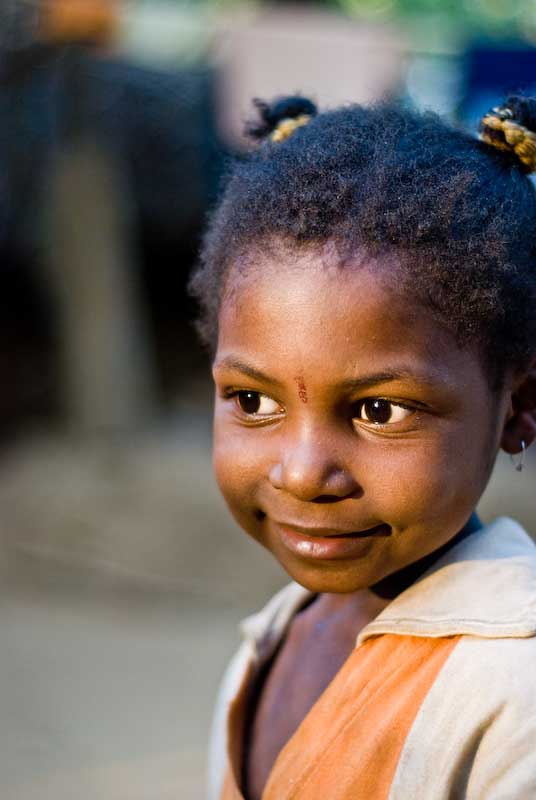
The Siddis have partial South Asian and Zanj ancestry.

The Siddi, also known as Sidi, Siddhi, Sheedi or Habshi, are an ethnic group inhabiting India. The first members of the community arrived on the subcontinent in 628 AD at the port of Bharuch. Others followed in their footsteps during the Muslim conquests beginning in 712 AD. The latter group are believed to have been serving under Muhammad bin Qasim's army, and were called Zanjis.

Some Siddis escaped slavery to establish communities in forested areas, and some also established the small Siddi principalities of Janjira State on Janjira Island and Jafarabad State in Kathiawar as early as the twelfth century. A former alternative name of Janjira was Habshan (i.e., land of the Habshis). In the Delhi Sultanate period prior to the rise of the Mughals in India, Jamal-ud-Din Yaqut was a prominent Siddi slave-turned-nobleman who was a close confidant of Razia Sultana (1235–1240 CE). Although this is disputed, he may also have been her lover, but contemporary sources do not indicate that this was necessarily the case.

Siddis were also brought as slaves by the Deccan Sultanates. Several former slaves rose to high ranks in the military and administration, the most prominent of which was Malik Ambar. The majority of them reside in Karnataka, Gujarat and Hyderabad. Siddis are primarily Muslims, although some are Hindus and others belong to the Catholic Church.

=== Pakistan ===
The Siddis, also known as Makranis, also inhabit Pakistan. They are descended from Bantu peoples from the African Great Lakes region. Some were merchants, sailors and mercenaries. Others were indentured servants, but the vast majority were brought to the Indian subcontinent as slaves by Portuguese and Arab merchants. The Siddi community is currently estimated at 20,000–55,000 individuals with the cities of Makran and Karachi serving as the main population centres for them. Siddis in Pakistan are primarily Sufi Muslims.

Narang et al. (2011) examined the autosomal DNA of Siddis in Pakistan. According to the researchers, about 58% of the Siddis' ancestry is derived from Bantu peoples. The remainder is associated with local Indo-European-speaking North and Northwest Indian populations, due to recent admixture events. However, Guha et al. (2012) observed few genetic differences between the Makrani of Pakistan and adjacent populations. According to the authors, the genome-wide ancestry of the Makrani was essentially the same as that of the neighboring Indo-European-speaking Balochi and Dravidian-speaking Brahui.

=== Sri Lanka ===
The Sri Lanka Kaffirs are an ethnic group in Sri Lanka who are partially descended from 16th-century Portuguese traders and Bantu slaves with additional admixture from ethnic Sri Lankans who were brought by them to work as labourers and soldiers to fight against the Sinhala Kings. They are very similar to the Zanj-descended populations in Iraq and Kuwait, and are known in Pakistan as Sheedis and in India as Siddis. The Kaffirs spoke a distinctive creole based on Portuguese, the Sri Lanka Kaffir language, now extinct. Their cultural heritage includes the dance styles Kaffringna and Manja and their popular form of dance music Baila.

The term Kaffir is said to mean 'non-believer'. It does not hold the same meaning in Sri Lanka as it does in countries like South Africa, where it is used as a racial slur.

== Southeast Asia ==
=== Philippines ===
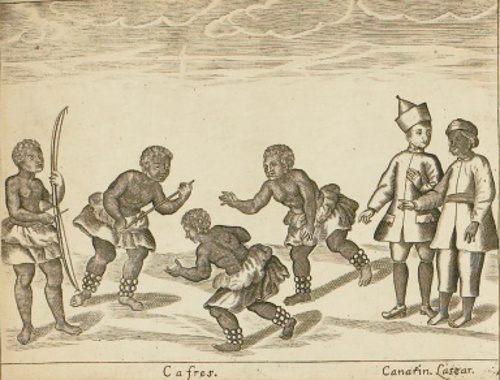
"Cafres" (East African slaves) on the Velarde map, 1754

Most older Afro-Filipinos were born from African-American G.I. and Filipino parentage. More recently, the Overseas Filipino Worker communities have produced interracial marriages with people of African descent in the Americas or Europe, resulting in Afro-Filipinos who may return to the country as natural born Filipinos. In 2011, The Nigerian Family Association notified the Republic of the Philippines Department of Foreign Affairs of its formation, opening membership to a growing number interracial Nigerian-Filipino/Filipino-Nigerian families and their children living in Nigeria.

Afro-Filipinos are not subject to socio-economical, cultural or political marginalization within Philippine society as other Afro-Asians may experience within more xenophobic neighboring Asian countries. This unique acceptance of Afro-Asians and biracials within the Philippines may be down to the full social integration of Afro-Asians who speak Philippine languages natively, Filipino familiarity with Aetas and other Negrito indigenous Filipinos who share some facial features and skin tones with Afro-Filipinos, popular affiliation to African-American culture and music as a relatable and non-colonial subculture or positive Afro-Filipino representation internationally, reflecting their patriotism and affinity to the Philippines.

Their social positions vary widely, with some living in poor or working class areas, while most are lower middle or upper middle class citizens. Most Afro-Filipinos live in and around Metro Manila, Calabarzon, Metro Cebu, or in Olongapo, Clark or Angeles cities in Central Luzon around the former American bases.

Many Afro-Filipinos represent the Philippines in international events like Kristina Knott and gold medalist Eric Cray (African-American-Filipino) in the 30th SEA Games held in the Philippines in 2019 or Mau Marcelo, winner of Philippine Idol 2006. Afro-Filipino sportsmen gain popularity within the highly popular Philippine Basketball Association or on local TV and in the hospitality sectors.

Among the country's most recognizable Afro-Asians are half African-American/Filipino R&B singers Jaya, Mau Marcelo and Luke Mejares.

=== Singapore ===
Mixed marriages between ethnic Asians and foreigners are becoming more common in Singapore. While most mixed marriages between ethnic Asians and foreigners involve marriages between Europeans and Asians, some marriages have involved Africans and Asians. Afro-Asians born out of these mixed marriages have added to the mixed race population of Singapore. The 2014 Miss Singapore Universe finalist Ijechi Nazirah Nwaozuzu is Afro-Asian. Her mother is Malay with additional Portuguese, Indian and Chinese ancestry and her father is Nigerian.

=== Vietnam ===
During the Vietnam War, many American soldiers found themselves fathering and subsequently left behind their mixed-race children( or Amerasian) with their native Vietnamese mother. The demographics of servicemen in the Vietnam war have also changed in recent history, especially with the integration of those with African-American descents into the war efforts. Throughout the course of the Vietnam War, the population of Afro-Vietnamese saw a drastic increase. Some of these children were abandoned by the Vietnamese family or sent to orphanages. Many orphans and children were airlifted to adopting families in the United States in 1975 during "Operation Babylift" before the fall of South Vietnam. The Afro-Vietnamese (or Afro-Amerasian) children suffered much discrimination in Vietnam at that time. There was also some controversy as to how these orphaned Afro-Amerasian children were placed in new homes in the United States.

==== Notable people ====
One of the most notable Afro-Vietnamese, while also might have been forgotten to history is Martine Bokassa, daughter of Jean-Bedel Bokassa, the 2nd president (1966–76) and emperor (r. 1976–79) of the Central African Republic, and Nguyễn Thị Huệ. Jean-Bedel Bokassa married Nguyễn Thị Huệ during his station in Indo-China as a French soldier in the Indochina Wars. He was separated from his Nguyễn Thị Huệ and his daughter shortly after, as the conflicts ended between durations of his tours of duty. After returning to his home country of Central African Republic, he quickly rose to power, and assumed the role of president in 1976. Wishing to reunite with his Afro-Vietnamese daughter, Jean-Bedel Bokassa seeks assistance the French consult in Saigon (now Ho Chi Minh City) and eventually was alerted of a match in Martine Nguyen Thi Bai. While celebration were going on in the CAR, an article were published on the "Trắng Đen" newspaper, stating the Martine that currently reunited with her father is in fact an imposter, and that the real daughter of Jean-Bedel Bokassa is still living in Saigon with her mother. After inviting both the real Martine and her mother to CAR, Jean-Bedel Bokassa accused the French government of espionage. On his 50th birthday, Jean-Bedel Bokassa decided to adopt the false Martine as his own daughter.

== West Asia ==
=== Saudi Arabia ===
According to The World Factbook, around 10% of Saudi Arabia's population is of Afro-Asian descent. Most Afro-Asians living in Saudi Arabia are Afro-Arabs of African origin, who occasionally face discrimination due to their dark skin.

== See also ==
- Afro-Asia
- Afro-Arabs
- Afro-Iranians
- Afro-Turks
- Negritos
