= African Leadership Academy =

Premier Pan-African high school in South Africa

- Roodepoort; South Africa

Information
- Established: c. 2004; 22 years ago
- Founders: Fred Swaniker; Chris Bradford; Peter Mombaur; Acha Leke
- Age range: 16 to 19
- Website: https://www.africanleadershipacademy.org

The African Leadership Academy (ALA) is an educational institution located in Roodepoort on the outskirts of Johannesburg, South Africa, for students between the ages of 16 and 19 years old, with current alumni coming from 46 countries.

Founded in 2004 by Fred Swaniker, Chris Bradford, Peter Mombaur, and Acha Leke, ALA officially opened in September 2008 with an inaugural class of 97 students. ALA teaches a two-year curriculum in African Studies, Writing, Rhetoric and Entrepreneurial Leadership, as well as the usual academic core subjects.

== History ==
Around 2004, the founders of ALA, launched Global Leadership Adventures, a summer program that would be a precursor to ALA.

In 2006, Swaniker and Bradford were recognized by Echoing Green, who described them as two of the 15 best emerging social entrepreneurs in the world. In 2007 the initial campus was confirmed, and Christopher Khaemba was announced as the inaugural Dean of the School. The current dean of African Leadership Academy is Uzo Agyare-Kumi.

== ALA campus ==
The campus is located in Honeydew, on the outskirts of Johannesburg. Students live in the Nelson Mandela residence, that includes six houses. Each house has a male and a female hall. The school also provides modern facilities including a sports field, a 450-seat auditorium, learning commons and a dining hall. In 2016, ALA renovated its dormitories, allowing the school to increase the number of students in each class by 30%. The campus is considered vibrant, bringing together students from all around the continent and a limited number of students from outside Africa, which makes the campus a space to celebrate cultural differences, especially during organized celebrations such as Taalu. That can be also demonstrated through the flags that are designing the campus dining-hall, and the strict policies related to respecting others' cultures and perspectives established within the campus.

== Admission process ==
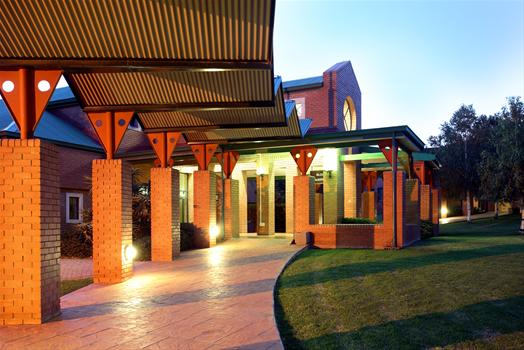
ALA Campus

The African Leadership Academy receives several thousand applications during the first round, where approximately 400 are selected to attend finalist events held across the continent. The finalists then write entrance exams, participate in group activities and are interviewed. 120 students are selected annually to attend the Academy. Admissions status is usually finalized by mid-April

== Curriculum ==
=== Two Year Pre-University Program ===
The academic core combines a two-year pre-university program based on the Cambridge A Levels and Entrepreneurial Leadership, African Studies and Writing and Rhetoric.

=== Entrepreneurial Leadership and African Studies ===
ALA's primary entrepreneurial leadership curriculum is a cornerstone of the student experience that creates opportunities to practice leadership and entrepreneurship skills through simulation and project-based learning. Students are encouraged to work on team building and original thinking. In the interdisciplinary African studies curriculum, students study hunger eradication, health care provision, economic growth, and conflict resolution.

== Faculty ==
=== Dean of African Leadership Academy ===
Inaugural Dean Christopher Situma Khaemba was previously Principal of Alliance High School on the outskirts of Nairobi, Kenya. Khaemba received his MBA from Kenyatta University in Nairobi.

The Dean of the Academy is Uzo Agyare-Kumi.

== Student life ==
=== Sports ===
Students are encouraged to participate in a fitness activity. Current competitive sports include soccer, basketball, and volleyball.

=== Student clubs and organizations ===
Students participate in a variety of clubs, and each student is expected to create or run either a "Student Enterprise," an "Original idea for Development," or a "Community Service Project."

=== Global Scholars Program ===
Global Scholars Program is a three-week, global leadership summer program for teens aged 13–19. Students from other countries around the world get the chance to come to ALA, and they learn more about the continent as well as skills related to leadership and entrepreneurship.

=== Catalyst Term ===
A study abroad experience for secondary students from around the world to develop as social innovators. Students can choose to take a trimester or a full year at ALA, where they can take the core subjects and engage in different activities on campus.

=== Model African Union ===
MAU is a four-day conference where participants from secondary schools around the world debate and discuss some of the most complicated issues on the continent. Participants also attend presentations by African Union officials and foreign policy experts.

== African Leadership Foundation ==
The African Leadership Foundation is a USA 501(c)(3) non-profit foundation that supports the African Leadership Academy and the next generation of African leaders.
