= Fred Swaniker =

Ghanaian entrepreneur

Frederick Kenneth Swaniker
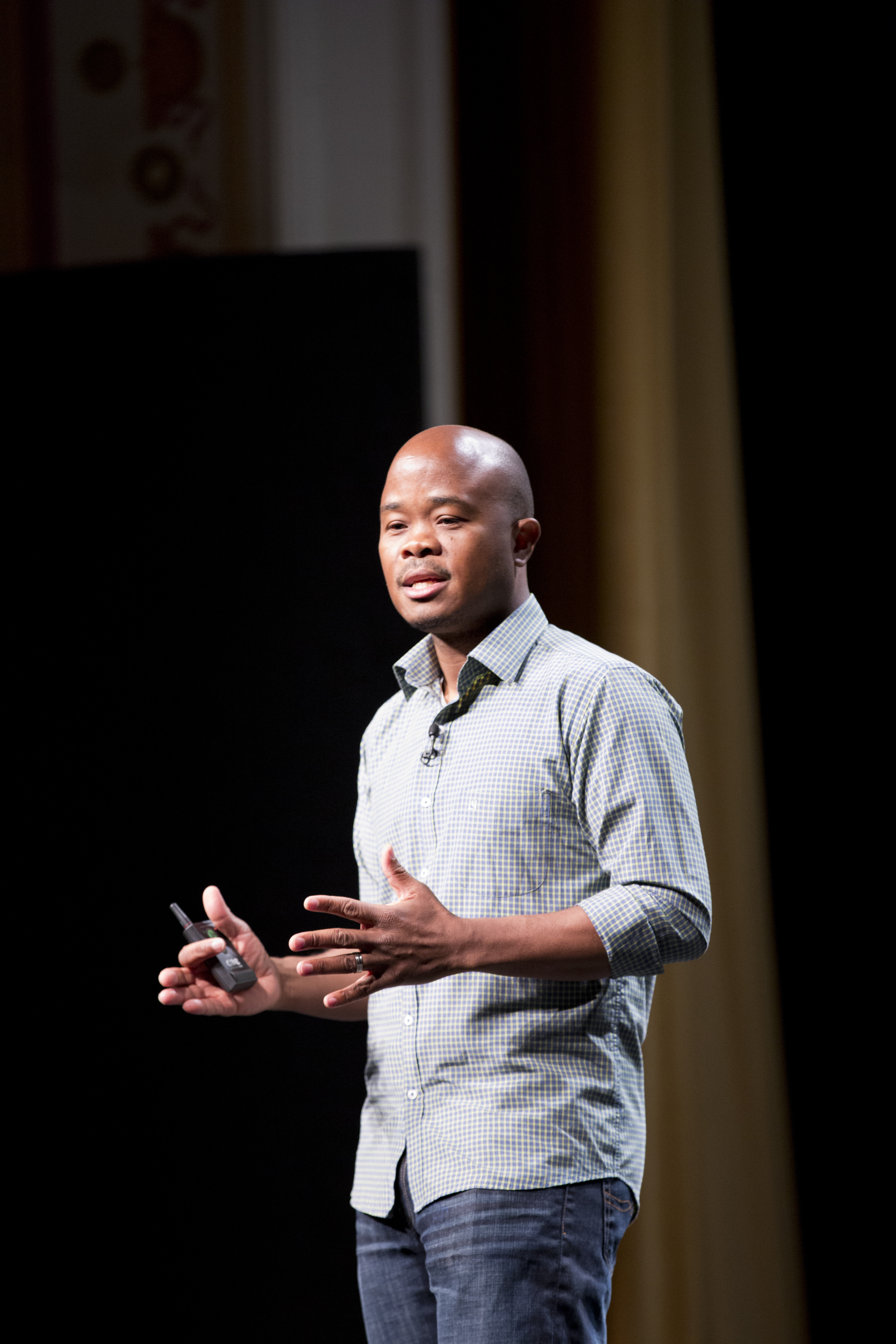
- Born: 1976 (age 49–50); Ghana
- Education: Macalester College; Stanford Graduate School of Business
- Occupations: Entrepreneur; educator
- Known for: Co-founder of African Leadership Academy, African Leadership University, Sand Technologies
- Website: ALX Africa

Fred Swaniker (born 1976) is a Ghanaian serial entrepreneur and leadership development expert. A graduate of Stanford, Swaniker recognized the importance of leadership and education while serving as the headmaster of a secondary school founded by his mother at the age of 18. He is the founder of the African Leadership Group.

He founded and led the pre-university African Leadership Academy based in South Africa, the African Leadership University with campuses in Mauritius and Rwanda, ALX, and Sand Technologies, aspiring to transform Africa by developing 3 million African leaders by 2035.

In 2019, Time magazine recognized him as one of the "100 Most Influential People in the World" and Fast Company included African Leadership Group among the 50 most innovative companies in the world.

== Early life and education ==
His father was a lawyer and magistrate, and his mother, an educator. Both are Ghanaian, but when he was 4 his family fled Ghana after the military coup and had lived in four countries in Africa by the time he was 18. He attended Macalester College in Minnesota and the Stanford Graduate School of Business in California, where he received an MBA and was named an Arjay Miller Scholar.

== Career ==
While attending Stanford, Swaniker wrote the business plan for African Leadership Academy, a pan-African school that would groom the future leaders of Africa. This was based on his belief that the single largest impediment to Africa's progress was the lack of good leadership. He leveraged his Silicon Valley connections to find financial backing and launched the Academy immediately after graduating in 2004. The full-time residential boarding school teaches leadership and entrepreneurial skills to students from across Africa while preparing them for universities around the world. By 2017, a thousand students had enrolled in the Academy. For most students, tuition is waived, provided they promise to return to Africa after graduating from college.

In 2014 at a TED conference in Brazil, Swaniker announced an expansion of his vision: a new network of 25 African universities that would ultimately groom 3 million leaders by 2060. By the end of 2016, two campuses had opened: one in Mauritius and the other in Rwanda. Fast Company recognized this network of universities as the 3rd 'Most Innovative Company' in Africa and CNN released a feature calling the university 'the Harvard of Africa'. Graca Machel, Nelson Mandela's widow, serves as the Chancellor of the university, while Donald Kaberuka, former President of the African Development Bank, serves as the Chairman of the university's Global Advisory Council.

Early in his career, Swaniker co-founded Synexa Life Sciences, a biotech company and Terra Education, a teen-focused immersive education and travel company.

Swaniker also leads Sand Technologies, a data and AI solutions company with engineers and data scientists distributed across Silicon Valley, France, the UK, Romania, Africa and other emerging markets.

== Recognition ==
Swaniker's work as an educational entrepreneur has been praised by U.S. President Barack Obama and Microsoft founder, Bill Gates.

He has been recognized as a TED Fellow (2009) and a World Economic Forum Young Global Leader (2012). He was named one of the Top Ten Young Power Men in Africa by a 2011 Forbes magazine online feature. Echoing Green recognized him as 'one of the top 15 social entrepreneurs in the world' in 2006. In 2017, Fred Swaniker received two honorary doctorates—one from Middlebury College in the USA and the second from Nelson Mandela University in South Africa. In 2018, he received a third honorary doctorate from Macalester College in the USA.

In 2019 he was recognized by Time magazine as one of the "100 Most Influential People in the World" and in 2023, he received the Time 100 Impact Award. Fast Company also included African Leadership Group among the 50 most innovative companies in the world.

Swaniker also sits on the board of the Rhodes Trust (awardees of the Rhodes Scholarships to Oxford University), and on the international advisory board of the University of Waterloo.

In 2024, Swaniker was honored with the President's Award for the Advancement of the Common Good by Stanford University.
