= James Wainaina Macharia =

Kenyan accountant (born 1959)

James Macharia
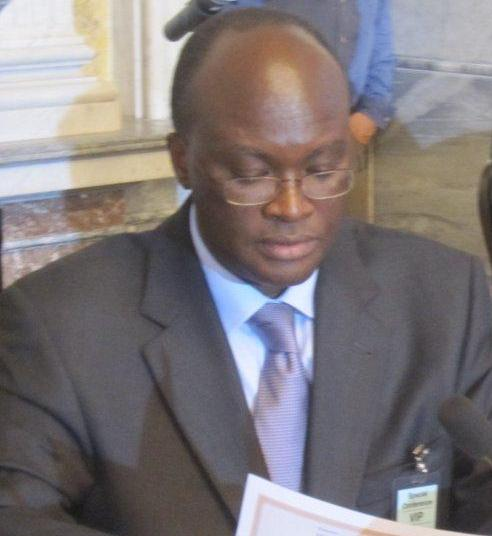

Cabinet Secretary for transport
- Incumbent
- Assumed office November 2015
- President: Uhuru Kenyatta
- Preceded by: Michael kamau

Personal details
- Born: 1959 (age 66–67) Gachocho, British Kenya
- Spouse: Pamela Chanda
- Children: Martin; Sandra
- Education: University of Nairobi (BCom); Henley Mngt. Coll. (MBA)
- Profession: Accountant: (CA, CPA)

James Wainaina Macharia (born 1959) is a Kenyan accountant who was nominated by President Uhuru Kenyatta as Cabinet Secretary for transport in November 2015. He replaced in acting capacity Michael kamau who was suspended in March 2015. Before that he was the cabinet secretary for health.
