= Chinese people in Kenya =

Ethnic group

Total population
- 50,000

Related ethnic groups
- Overseas Chinese

There may have been minor settlement of Chinese people in Kenya as early as the 15th century; however, modern migration from the People's Republic of China to Kenya only dates to the late 1990s and early 2000s. There are estimated to be 50,000 Chinese people in the country.

== Migration history ==
=== Zheng He's fleet ===
Early Chinese mariners had a variety of contacts with Kenya. Archaeologists have found Chinese trade ceramics made in the Tang dynasty (618–907) along the Kenyan coast. Ceramics of the early Ming Dynasty that were believed to have been brought over by Zheng He during his 15th century ocean voyages have also been recovered. On Lamu Island off the Kenyan coast, local oral tradition maintains that 20 shipwrecked Chinese sailors, possibly part of Zheng's fleet, washed up on shore there hundreds of years ago. Given permission to settle by local tribes after having killed a dangerous python, they converted to Islam and married local women. Now, they are believed to have just six descendants left there; in 2002, DNA tests conducted on one of the women confirmed that she was of Chinese descent. Her daughter, Mwamaka Sharifu, later received a PRC government scholarship to study traditional Chinese medicine (TCM) in China.

On Pate Island, Frank Viviano described in a July 2005 National Geographic article how ceramic fragments had been found around Lamu which the administrative officer of the local Swahili history museum claimed were of Chinese origin, specifically from Zheng He's voyage to east Africa. The eyes of the Pate people resembled Chinese and Famao and Wei were some of the names among them which were speculated to be of Chinese origin. Their ancestors were said to be from indigenous women who intermarried with Chinese Ming sailors when they were shipwrecked. Two places on Pate were called "Old Shanga", and "New Shanga", which the Chinese sailors had named. A local guide who claimed descent from the Chinese showed Viviano a graveyard made out of coral on the island, indicating that they were the graves of the Chinese sailors, which the author described as "virtually identical" to Chinese Ming dynasty tombs, complete with "half-moon domes" and "terraced entries".

=== Modern migration ===
The modern wave of Chinese migration to Kenya dates back to the late 20th century. As recently as 1996, there were few Chinese in Kenya, and the capital Nairobi had only one Chinese restaurant, but by 2007, the city boasted an estimated forty Chinese restaurants, largely opened by expatriates from mainland China. Most have settled in the area around the Chinese embassy, which is located near the State House and the Defence Headquarters, in a relatively high-security part of the city. There are also some Chinese in the coastal city of Mombasa. Restaurants and TCM clinics are two popular lines of business for Chinese in the city. Chinese in various parts of the country also run import/export businesses, with products as varied as computers, glassware, and automobile parts for import, and shark fins for export.

Recent Chinese migrants cite Kenya's relative stability and high rate of growth as factors in choosing it as their destination. However, many of them consisted of middle-aged people, as younger migrants preferred destinations in Europe or the United States. In total, estimates published in popular media from 2006 through 2008 place the number of Chinese in Kenya at anywhere between 3,000 and 10,000 people.

New interest in Kenya's natural resources has attracted over $1 billion of investment from Chinese firms. This has propelled new development in Kenya's infrastructure with Chinese firms bringing in their own male workers to build roads. The temporary residents usually arrive without their spouses and families. Thus, a rise of incidents involving local college-aged females has resulted in an increased rate of Afro-Chinese infant births to single Kenyan mothers.

In Kenya there is a trend of the following influx of Chinese male workers in Kenya with a growing number of abandoned babies of Chinese men who fathered children with local women, causing concern.

== Education and media ==
Kenya has one Chinese community school, the Kenya-China School (肯尼亚中国学校), founded in March 2006. It has 20 teachers, among whom five teach Chinese, and 200 students, including 20 at the kindergarten level, 50 in the primary school division, and 130 technical students. The student body is just 25% Chinese. The Confucius Institute has also opened a branch at the University of Nairobi, its first on the African continent. A second Institute now exists at Kenyatta University on the outskirts of Nairobi. Overtime, Confucius institutes has spread to other universities like Moi University in Eldoret and Egerton University in Nakuru county.

China Radio International and China Central Television are rebroadcast for a few hours a day by the Kenya Broadcasting Corporation.

== Integration and community ==
Some local Kenyan merchants complain that Chinese expatriates selling imported goods are taking jobs from them. They accuse Chinese traders of "taking photographs of their goods to copy the designs", and claim "they have unfair advantages such as cheap labour in China local government support". Chinese people have also opened apparel factories in Kenya's export processing zones, but there have been protests against poor working conditions there. Many Chinese businesspeople, especially those in the textiles industry, try to avoid directly dealing with locals as a result of this opprobrium, instead employing Kenyan human resources managers and accountants. The Kenyan government are taking a variety of steps to attempt to address the trade imbalance between the two countries, including encouraging Chinese traders to invest in local production facilities.

Chinese people are respected by most Kenyan locals for the infrastructure that Chinese companies have built in Kenya, such as the Thika Road. However, Chinese engineers working in remote parts of the country on such infrastructure projects stand out significantly from locals, and often face the danger of local violence.

=== Chinatowns ===
There are several Chinatowns in the capital city of Nairobi. Most of them are low profile as some complain that the Chinese establishments were "Catering only to the Chinese community".

== See also ==
- Indians in Kenya
- Chinatowns in Africa
- China–Kenya relations
