= Greater Luyia languages =

Subgroup of Great Lakes Bantu languages spoken in Kenya and Uganda

Greater Luyia
- Geographic distribution: Western Province (Kenya), Bugisu sub-region, Busia District, Butaleja District
- Linguistic classification: Niger–Congo?: Atlantic–Congo; Volta-Congo; Benue–Congo; Bantoid; Southern Bantoid; Bantu; Northeast Bantu; Great Lakes Bantu; Greater Luyia
- Proto-language: Proto-Greater Luyia
- Subdivisions: Logooli; Luhya

Language codes
- Glottolog: grea1291

The Greater Luyia languages (also spelled Luhyia or Luhya) are a subgroup of the great Lakes Bantu languages spoken in Western Kenya and Eastern Uganda

== Classification ==
The Greater Luyia languages are classified by Glottolog as follows:

- Greater Luyia
  - Logooli
  - Luhya
    - Idaxo-Isuxa-Tiriki
    - Samia-Wanga-Bukusu
      - Northern Luyia
        - Bukusu
        - Masaba
      - Saamia-Wanga
        - Central Eastern Luyia
          - Kabarasi-Tachoni-Nyala East
            - East Nyala
            - Kabras
            - Tachoni
          - Kisa-Marama-Tsotso
            - Kisa
            - Marama
            - Tsotso
          - Nyole
          - Wanga
        - Western Luyia
          - Marachi-Khayo
            - Khayo
            - Marachi
          - Saamiaic
            - Nyole
            - Saamia
          - West Nyala
