= Kabras =

The Kabras, or Kabarasi, or Ava/Aba-Kabarasi (in plural) are a subtribe of the Luhya people of Kenya. They reside majorly in Malava Sub-County in Kakamega County, large groups of the Kabras people can also be found living in Lugari,Likuyani and Lurambi constituencies Within Kakamega County. A number of Kabras people have also immigrated to Turbo Constituency in Uasin Gishu County . They are neighboured by the Isukha, Banyala, Tsotso, and the Tachoni. The exact origin of the Luhya people is currently disputed, but there are historians who believe that the group came from West-Central Africa and migrated to their present-day location by way of the so-called Great Bantu Migration.

The Kabras dialect called Lukabaras/ Olu-Kabarasi is almost similar to Tachoni. However, the Kabras have spread to other regions as a result of intermarriages and movements to seek greener pastures in formal employment. These people are described as adaptable, easily absorbing other cultural values and beliefs. This can be demonstrated in the way many Kabras practice the Christian and Muslim faiths. Notable cultural practices include circumcision ceremonies and bride-price required for marriage.

== History ==
Kabrasi clans were named after the heads of the families. They include Abanzasi (Bakamulamba) Abasira, Avatali, Abawande, Abamutama, Basonje, Abashibika, Abakhusia, Bamachina, Abashu, Abamutsembi, Abasumira, Baluu, Batobo, Bachetsi, and Bamakangala. Along with 17 other Luhya subtribes, the Kabras constitute 14 percent of the Kenyan population, making the ethnic group the second largest in the country, next to the Kikuyu.

Before the colonial era, the Kabaras were under the rulership of Nabongo Mumia, the king of the Wanga. They were represented by an elder in his Council of Elders. The last known elder in the king's council was Soita Libukana Samaramarami. The Kabaras are said to have originally been Banyala.

When Quaker missionaries came to Kenya in the early part of the twentieth century, they spread out to Kabaras from Kaimosi in Tiriki. During the British colonization, the Kabras - along with the Wanga tribe - collaborated with the colonialists. These tribes, especially the Bukusu, which waged strong resistance to the invaders, avoided the fate of most of the Luhya people, who lost their fertile lands to the British colonial rule.

== Politics ==
In politics, one of the famous Kabras politician is Dr. Noah Mahalang'ang'a Wekesa, the former Kwanza MP and who also served as Wildlife and Forestry minister under President Mwai Kibaki. Another notable Kabras politician was the late Soita Shitanda, who represented Malava Constituency in parliament and served as a Housing Minister in President Mwai Kibaki's cabinet. He was instrumental in the revival of the sugarcane industry in Western Kenya, spearheading the establishment of West Kenya Sugar factory in Malava. Other notable Kabras include Popular Radio Presenter Kigogo Francis Luchivya, TV Presenter Tonnny kwalanda, former basketball Star Angela Luchivya, Advocate Amos Shihundu, Former Chief Justice, the Late Zacchaeus Chesoni, who hailed from the Kabras sub tribe Bamachina clan close to Chimoi area near Webuye. Others are Omurembe Iyadi, former director of Agricultural Finance Cooperation (AFC) and the late Peter Jonah Mmula of the ministry of lands and settlement (during Mzee Jomo Kenyatta's presidency) who was a close ally and key player in the late Masinde Muliro's political and business prowess. Dr. Noah Wekesa and the late Peter Mmula are first cousins, their mothers being sisters.

== Economic activities ==
Kabras people are farmers, practicing livestock rearing and crop farming. The main cash crop is sugarcane, which is harvested and taken to West Kenya Sugar Company, Butali Sugar as well as Mumias Sugar Company. With the decreasing demand for sugarcane due to shutting down of local companies, the Kabras have resorted to other crop farming and livestock rearing.

== See also ==
- Luhya languages
