= Nyole =

Nyole may refer to:

- Nyole tribe, of the Luhya nation
- Nyole language (Kenya) (ISO 639-3: nyd)
- Nyole language (Uganda) (ISO 639-3: nuj)
- Nyole people, an ethnic group of Uganda
