= Luhya language =

Bantu language spoken in Kenya

Luhya
- Luyia
- Oluluhya
- Native to: Kenya
- Ethnicity: Luhya
- Language family: Niger–Congo?: Atlantic–Congo; Volta-Congo; Benue–Congo; Bantoid; Southern Bantoid; Bantu; Northeast Bantu; Great Lakes Bantu; Greater Luyia; Luhya
- Early form: Proto-Luhya
- Writing system: Latin

Language codes
- ISO 639-3: luy – inclusive code (includes all languages spoken by ethnic Luhya, not just the following); Individual codes: lrm – Marama lwg – Wanga (Hanga) lks – Kisa lto – Tsotso lkb – Kabras nle – (East) Nyala
- Glottolog: cent2288 Central Luyia (incl. some Nyore) kabr1240 Kabras
- Guthrie code: JE.32

Luhya (/ˈluːjə/; also Luyia, Oluluyia, Luhia or Luhiya) is a Bantu language of western Kenya.

== Dialects ==
The various Luhya tribes speak several related languages and dialects, though some of them are no closer to each other than they are to neighboring non-Luhya languages. For example, the Bukusu people are ethnically Luhya, but the Bukusu dialect is a variety of Masaba. (See Luhya people for details.) However, there is a core of mutually intelligible dialects that comprise Luhya proper:

- Wanga (OluWanga)
- Tsotso (OluTsotso)
- Marama (OluMarama)
- Kisa (OluShisa)
- Kabras (LuKabarasi)
- East Nyala (LuNyala)

=== All Luhya subtribes ===
1. Banyala
2. Bukusu
3. Gisu
4. Idakho
5. Isukha
6. Kabras
7. Khayo
8. Kisa
9. Marachi
10. Maragoli
11. Marama
12. Masaaba
13. Nyole
14. Samia
15. Tachoni
16. Tiriki
17. Tsotso
18. Wanga

=== Comparison ===
A comparison between two dialects of Luhya proper, and to two other Bantu languages spoken by the Luhya:

English	Kisa	Logoli	Nyole	Wanga
I (me)	eshie	nzi/ inze	ise	esie
words	amakhuwa	makuva	amang'ana, amakhuwa	amakhuwa
chair	eshifumbi	indeve/ endeve	indebe	eshisala
head	omurwe	mutwi	omurwe	om'rwe
money	amapesa	mang'ondo	amang'ondo, am'mondo, etsilupia	amapesa, irupia

=== Comparison to Bantu ===
English	Luhya	Kikuyu	Kinyarwanda	Lingala	Luganda	Shona	Swahili	Zulu
children	abana, baana, otwana, orwana, vaana	twana	abana	bana	baana, abaana	vana	wana	abantwana
dog	imbwa	ngui (pron. gui)	imbwa	mbwa	mbwa, embwa	mbwa, imbwa	mbwa	inja
fire	omuliro	mwaki	umuriro	moto	omuliro	moto	moto	umlilo

== Phonology ==
The following is the phonology of the Luwanga dialect:

=== Vowels ===
	Front	Central	Back
Close	i iː		u uː
Mid	e eː		o oː
Open		a aː	

=== Consonants ===
		Bilabial	Labio- dental	Alveolar	Post- alveolar	Palatal	Velar
Stop	plain	p		t			k
Stop	prenasal	ᵐb		ⁿd		ᶮɟ	ᵑɡ
Affricate				ts	tʃ		
Fricative	plain	β	f	s	ʃ		x
Fricative	prenasal			ⁿz			
Nasal		m		n		ɲ	ŋ
Trill				r			
Approximant				l		j	w
