= Maragoli Cultural Festival =

Held in Mbale town every 26 December, the Maragoli Cultural Festival was for a long time, in decades gone by, the biggest event of the year in the region - coming a day after Christmas: probably the biggest holiday in Kenya; and frequently attended by the former president Daniel Arap Moi.

It is a showcase of the culture and traditions of, not only the Maragoli but, the whole Luhya community that resides in Vihiga District. This Luhya community comprises the Maragoli, Bunyore, Tiriki, and the neighbouring Idakho and Kisa.

The festival is organised by the Vihiga Cultural Society.

The first patron was the late Moses Mudavadi, father of one of Kenya's two deputy prime ministers Musalia Mudavadi.
