= Marama tribe =

Tribe of the Luhya nation of Kenya

The Marama, also known as Abamarama, are a Luhya tribe occupying Marama Location in Kakamega District of the western province of Kenya. The town of Butere is located in west Marama and is a significant trading centre in Kakamega. They are said to have assimilated the Abashikunga clan of the Idakho.

There is this great history associated with the a marama people that on their way to Kenya from through Uganda they first settled at the current Luoland place called Kaugak. Actually the amarama believe that the name should be kwa Bukachi, one of their sons whom the left behind at this point. Luos being unable to pronounce the name kwa Bukachi just put it to Kaugak

The main group then moved forward to the present Shiatsala area from where they spread their wings. At Shiatsala they found the Abatere people who had settled here earlier. They overpowered the Abatere and it's from their powers that they acquired their clan name abamukhula and/ or abamukoyia

The origin of the name Marama came up at this point of settlement..Shiatsala and the father to that name was Muchelule

Muchelule had two wives. The first wife gave birth to Abashianda while the other wife gave birth to abashiatsala, abashibembe, abamauko and abashishebu. Those are the current five houses of abamukhula which is the dominant subclan of abamarama. Abamukhula therefore can dress their origin from the man Muchelule.

== History and culture ==
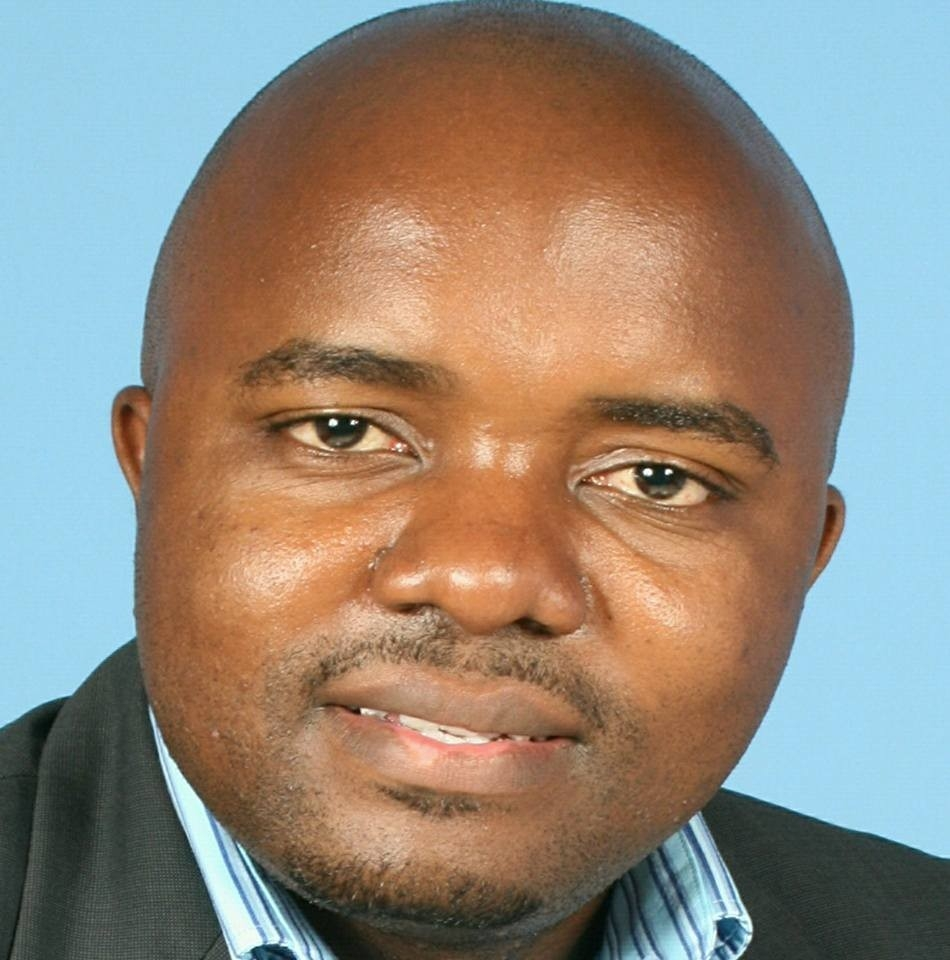
Tindi Mwale.

They are a calm people, welcoming and quite organized. Main activities include crop farming and small scale business. The current member of parliament (2018) for the area is Tindi Mwale, a Marama. The first Governor of Kakamega, His Excellency Opararanya, also hails from the community.

=== Migrations ===
Marama people are said to have come to Kenya through Uganda. After the collapse of the Chwezi Empire of Uganda, a man named Wamoyi migrated to Tiriki with his three sons (Wanga, Khabiakala and Eshifumbi). Wanga migrated to Emanga, Eshifumbi migrated to Emahondo (he is the ancestor of the Abamuyira and Abakakoya clans). Angulu (Wanga's nephew) migrated to Butere. His offspring founded the Abakhuli, Abashiambitsi, Abakhongo and Abaseta. Martin Shikuku was from Abarecheya. With over 40% of the population, Abamukhula is the dominant clan with several subclans and they are the “real” Abamarama. Other big clans are the Abashirotsa, Abatere, Abashieni, Abamanyulia, Abalukhoba.

== See also ==
- Luhya languages

== Sources ==
- Gideon S. Ware; Western Kenya Historical Texts: Abaluyia, Teso and Elgon Kalenjin, Nairobi: East African Literature Bureau, 1967, 196p.
