= Luhya =

Luhya or Abaluyia or Luyia may refer to:

- Luhya people
- Luhya language
