= Luhya people =

Ethnic group in Kenya, Uganda and Tanzania

Luhya
Abaluhya
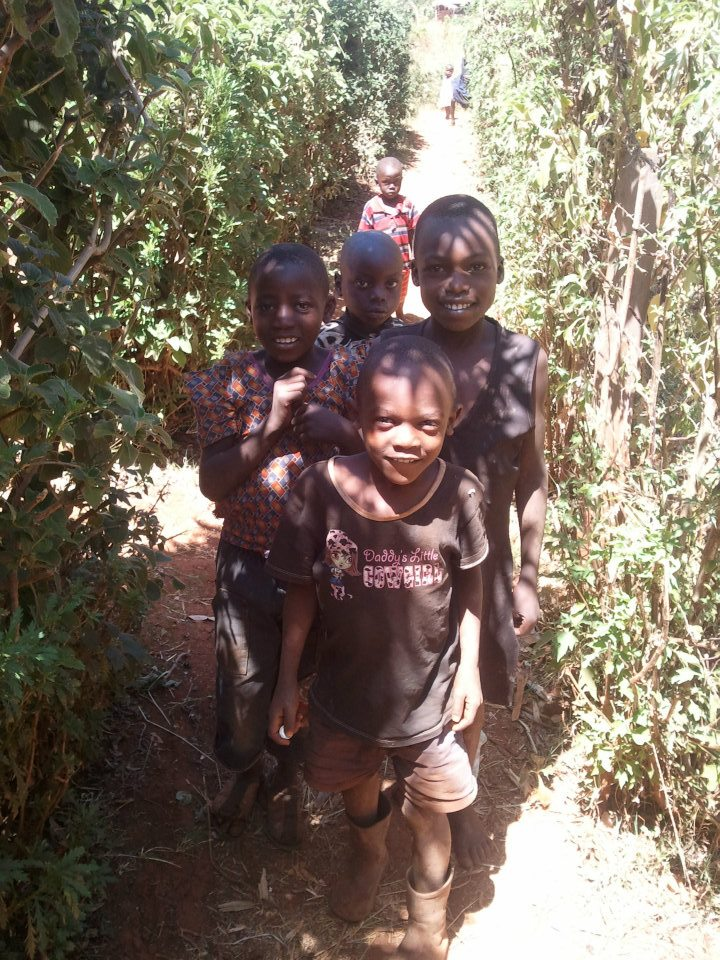
- Luhya children in rural western Kenya

Total population
- 6,823,482 (2019 census)

Regions with significant populations
- Kenya (western counties and major cities); Uganda (Eastern Region); Tanzania (Kagera and Mara regions)

Languages
- Luhya varieties, Swahili, English

Religion
- Predominantly Christianity; minority African traditional religion

Related ethnic groups
- other Great Lakes Bantu peoples (for example Ganda, Haya, Kuria)

- Person: OmuLuyia
- People: AbaLuyia
- Language: OluLuyia
- Country: EbuLuyia

The Luhya (also known as Luyia or Abaluhya) are a Bantu speaking ethnic group comprising more than 20 related tribes. Geographically centered in the fertile Lake Victoria Basin of Western Kenya, they also maintain significant populations in eastern Uganda and northern Tanzania. They are Kenya’s second-largest ethnic group, numbering 6,823,482 per the 2019 census (approximately 14% of the national population). Often described as an "ethnolinguistic constellation," the groups include the Bukusu, Maragoli, Kabarasi, Tachoni, Wanga, and Samia, among others. Each sub-tribe maintains a distinct dialect and clan system while sharing a unified identity and common cultural institutions.

Location of the former Western Province of Kenya, the historic heartland of the Luhya people.

The Bukusu remain the most populous tribe at 1,188,963 individuals, followed by the Maragoli (641,714) and the Idakho/Isukha groups of Kakamega (584,207). A significant trend in modern Luhya identity is the emergence of a broad, unified affiliation; notably, 1,105,308 individuals ethnically identified simply as "Luhya (So Stated)" without specifying a particular sub-tribe reflected in the 2019 Kenya National Bureau of Statistics (KNBS) report. Other major groups include the Bunyore (312,854), Marama (247,025), and the Wanga (226,358), while smaller groups like the Tiriki, Kabras, and Tachoni further enrich this constellation.

== Etymology and identity ==
The autonym Abaluhya or Abaluyia is commonly glossed as "people of the same hearth" or "people of the north" in several Luhya varieties, from the root -luhya/-luyia and the plural prefix aba- meaning "people of". Individuals are OmuLuyia, the people are AbaLuyia, the language cluster OluLuyia and the imagined homeland EbuLuyia.

The term "Luhya" gained political salience in the 1940s and 1950s when colonial administrators, African politicians and mission educated elites began to group a number of western Kenyan Bantu communities together for representation in new colonial institutions. Earlier labels such as "North Kavirondo" and "Kavirondo Bantu" gave way to a more unified "Baluhya" identity in the decade before Kenyan independence.

Within this broad identity, people usually self identify first by subtribe (for example Omubukusu, Omumaragoli, Omusamia) and then by clan. Luhya identity has nonetheless become important in Kenyan party politics, especially since the reintroduction of multiparty competition in the 1990s.

== History ==
=== Precolonial period ===
Archaeological, linguistic and genetic evidence links Luhya origins to the wider Bantu expansion from west central Africa into the Great Lakes region between roughly three and five millennia ago. By the second millennium CE, Bantu speaking communities closely related to contemporary Luhya were established on the northern and western slopes of Mount Elgon, along the middle Nzoia River and in the lowlands around present day Kakamega, Vihiga and Busia.

Precolonial Luhya societies were politically decentralized. Most groups lived in small clan based polities headed by councils of elders, ritual specialists and lineage leaders. The exception was the Wanga, whose kingdom under the Nabongo (king) developed a more centralized court and tributary system that interacted with neighboring Luo, Nandi and Maasai communities and later with Arab and Swahili traders.

Economically, Luhya groups combined shifting cultivation of sorghum, finger millet, cowpeas and bananas with livestock herding and hunting. Iron working and pottery were well developed, and households engaged in regional exchange networks that linked the highlands to Lake Victoria and, through caravan trade, to the coast.

=== Nineteenth century and first European contact ===
From the early nineteenth century, intensified long distance trade, cattle raiding and population movements reshaped western Kenya. Maasai and Kalenjin cattle raiding occasionally reached Luhya areas, while Luo groups expanded along the Nzoia and Yala rivers. The Wanga kingdom under Nabongo Mumia consolidated its influence through alliances, warfare and control of trade routes linking Buganda, Busoga, Kavirondo and the coast.

Arab and Swahili traders reached Wanga and Samia areas in the mid nineteenth century, exchanging cloth, beads and guns for ivory and other products. British explorers such as Henry Morton Stanley and Joseph Thomson encountered Luhya communities while passing around Lake Victoria in the 1870s and 1880s, describing the region in terms that later fed into British colonial mapping.

=== Colonial rule (1895 to 1963) ===
With the creation of the East Africa Protectorate in 1895 and later the Colony and Protectorate of Kenya, Luhya territory was incorporated into the North Kavirondo and Elgon Nyanza districts. Colonial rule introduced new administrative boundaries, taxation, Christian missions and cash crop production.

The Wanga kingdom became an early ally of the British. Nabongo Mumia was confirmed as a paramount chief, and Wanga elders assisted in collecting taxes and labor, a relationship that brought both advantage and controversy among neighboring groups. Elsewhere, Luhya communities experienced land alienation in parts of what became the White Highlands, forced labor on European farms and the recruitment of young men into the King's African Rifles and settler estates.

Christian missions, especially the Friends Africa Mission, the Church of God, the Anglicans and the Roman Catholic Church established schools and churches in Kaimosi, Bunyore, Mumias and other centers from the first decade of the twentieth century. Conversion to Christianity intersected with existing beliefs in Nyasaye/Were, ancestral spirits and ritual specialists.

Luhya soldiers fought for the British in both world wars, and many veterans brought back new political ideas and experiences. In the 1940s and 1950s, the Dini ya Msambwa religious movement led by Elijah Masinde among the Bukusu combined Christian and traditional elements with anti colonial protest and was repressed by the colonial state.

=== Toward independence (about 1900 to 1963) ===
From the 1930s, mission schooling produced an emerging Luhya educated class that participated in nationalist politics and colonial advisory bodies. Leaders such as Masinde Muliro and Moses Mudavadi were active in the Kenya African Union and other organizations that demanded land rights, better wages and representation.

The name "Luhya" was increasingly used in the 1940s and 1950s as a political category for representation in the Legislative Council and in African district associations. By the time of independence in 1963, a sense of being Luhya sat alongside strong loyalties to local subgroups such as Bukusu, Maragoli, Wanga, Banyore, Samia and others.

=== After independence (1963 to 2010) ===
At independence, most of the Luhya population fell within the new Western Province and small parts of Rift Valley Province. Western Province became associated in popular commentary with high population density, smallholder sugarcane and maize farming, and extensive out migration to Nairobi, Mombasa and other towns.

Luhya leaders played important roles in postcolonial governments. Masinde Muliro and Moses Mudavadi served as ministers in the administrations of Jomo Kenyatta and Daniel arap Moi. Later, Musalia Mudavadi, Michael Wamalwa Kijana and Moody Awori all held the office of vice president or deputy prime minister at different moments, helping entrench the idea of the "Luhya vote" as a significant electoral bloc.

Political competition in western Kenya was often shaped by national party alignments rather than a single regional party. Luhya politicians appeared across the ideological spectrum in parties such as KANU, FORD Kenya, NARC, ODM and later Kenya Kwanza and Azimio formations.

=== Devolution and contemporary politics (2010 to present) ===
The 2010 Constitution of Kenya introduced a devolved system of 47 counties. Luhya populations now form majorities in the counties of Kakamega, Bungoma, Vihiga and Busia, and large pluralities in parts of Trans Nzoia and Nandi.

County governors, senators and members of county assemblies from these areas have become significant power brokers in national coalitions. Wycliffe Oparanya served two terms as governor of Kakamega and was chair of the Council of Governors, while Moses Wetang'ula became Speaker of the National Assembly in 2022 and Musalia Mudavadi was appointed Prime Cabinet Secretary in the same year.

Analysts often describe the "Luhya vote" as numerically important but politically fragmented, with different subregions and leaders backing competing coalitions in the 2007, 2013, 2017 and 2022 general elections.

== Demographics and distribution ==
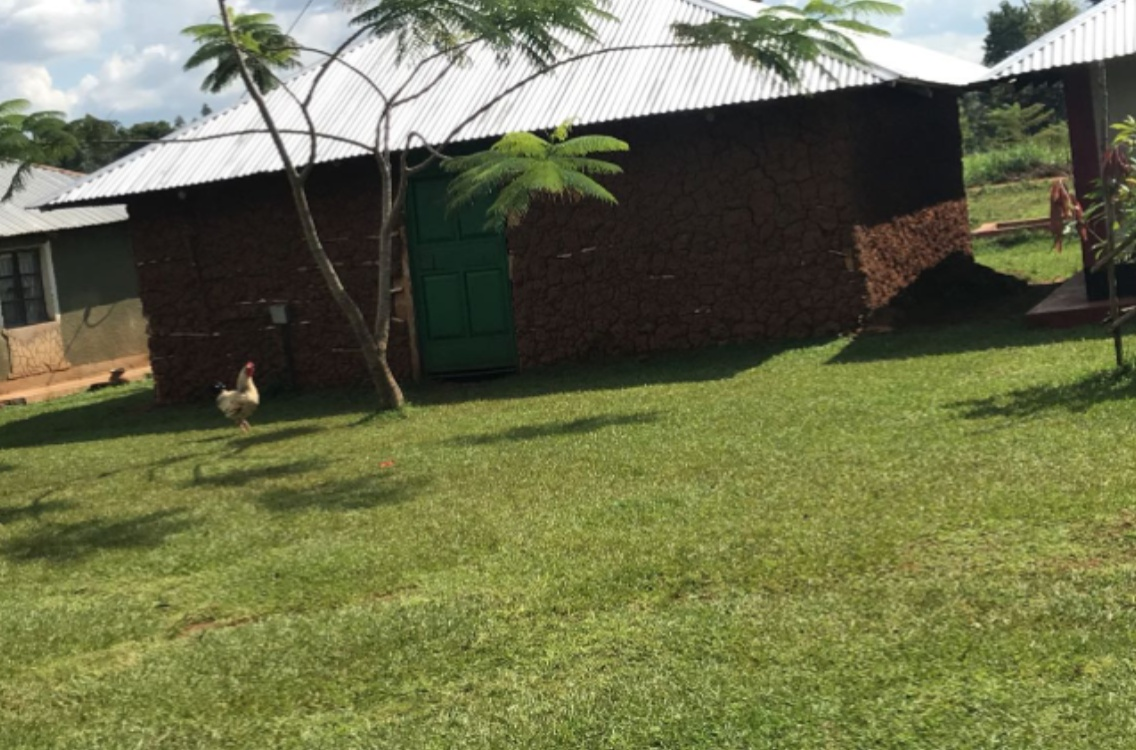
Traditional house in rural western Kenya associated with Luhya homesteads.

The majority of Luhya-speaking sub-groups and tribes are located primarily in Western Kenya and consist of 17 of the approximately 20 Luhya groups in the East African region. Notably, several sub-groups share close geographic borders and cultural ties with neighboring Kalenjin-speaking communities, such as the Bukusu and Tachoni with the Sabaot, and the Tiriki and Kabras with the Nandi and Terik, leading to significant historical intermarriage and shared traditions.

Significant rural Luhya populations are found in:

- Kakamega County (Idakho, Isukha, Kabras, Marama, Tsotso, and parts of Wanga and Banyore)
- Bungoma County (Bukusu, Tachoni)
- Vihiga County (Maragoli, Bunyore/Abanyore, Tiriki)
- Busia County (Samia, Khayo, Nyala, Marachi, parts of Wanga)
- Trans Nzoia County (Bukusu, Tachoni and other Luhya migrants)
- parts of Nandi County, Uasin Gishu County and Nairobi County through urban migration.

Luhya communities in Uganda live mainly in Eastern Uganda, especially in Tororo District, Mbale District and Busia District, where closely related Basamia, Banyole and Gisu (Masaba) populations reside.

=== Counties and regions ===
The table below summarizes Kenyan counties with substantial Luhya populations, based primarily on the 2019 census and secondary syntheses. Percentages are approximate and may vary by sub location.

County	Former Province	Main Luhya subgroups	Administrative centre	Notes
Kakamega County	Western	Idakho, Isukha, Kabras, Marama, Tsotso, parts of Wanga, Banyore	Kakamega	Considered the demographic and political centre of Luhya country, with dense settlement and sugarcane, maize and tea farming.
Bungoma County	Western/Rift Valley	Bukusu, Tachoni	Bungoma	Large scale maize and sugarcane zone; Bukusu are among the largest single Luhya subgroups.
Vihiga County	Western	Maragoli, Tiriki, Bunyore (Abanyore)	Mbale	Highly fragmented landholdings, significant tea production and commuter ties to Kisumu and Kakamega.
Busia County	Western	Samia, Khayo, Marachi, Nyala, parts of Wanga	Busia	Cross border trading hub linking Kenya and Uganda, with mixed fishing and agriculture along Lake Victoria and the Sio River.
Trans Nzoia County	Rift Valley	Bukusu, Tachoni and other Luhya migrants	Kitale	High potential maize zone; Luhya populations expanded here after the redistribution of former settler farms following independence.

== Language ==
The Luhya speak a cluster of mutually intelligible Bantu languages often referred to collectively as "Luhya" or OluLuyia. Linguists usually treat these as a set of related but distinct languages, including Lubukusu, Lulogooli (Logoli), Lunyore, Lusamia, Lwisukha, Lwidakho, Lunyala, Lukabarasi, Lutachoni, Lumarama, Olutsotso, Oluwanga and others.

Common features include noun class systems, extensive verbal morphology and the use of prefixes such as aba-/ava- for people and olu-/olu- for languages. Many Luhya are multilingual, speaking one or more Luhya varieties, Swahili as the national lingua franca and English in formal contexts.

== Subgroups ==
Luhya identity encompasses more than twenty historically distinct subtribes. The list below gives commonly recognized subgroups and their main areas of settlement. Terminology varies between scholarly sources and in local usage.

Subgroup (autonym)	Common English name	Primary dialect	Main Kenyan districts/counties
Ababukusu	Bukusu	Lubukusu	Bungoma, Trans Nzoia, Mount Elgon
Abamaragoli / Avalogooli	Maragoli	Lulogooli	Vihiga (Maragoli), parts of Kisumu
Abanyole / Abanyore	Banyore (Bunyore)	Olunyole	Vihiga (Emuhaya, Luanda), parts of Kisumu
Abanyala ba Busia	Nyala (east)	Lunyala (Busia)	Busia
Abanyala ba Ndombi	Nyala (west)	Lunyala (Kakamega)	Kakamega (Navakholo)
Abawanga	Wanga	Oluwanga	Kakamega (Mumias, Matungu), Busia
Abatiriki	Tiriki	Lutirichi	Vihiga (Tiriki)
Abasidakho	Idakho	Lwidakho	Kakamega (south)
Abasiiukha	Isukha	Lwisukha	Kakamega (east)
Abakabras	Kabras	Lukabarasi	Kakamega (Malava)
Abatsotso	Tsotso	Olutsotso	Kakamega (central west)
Abamarama	Marama	Lumarama	Kakamega (Butere)
Abakisa	Kisa	Olushisa	Kakamega (Khwisero)
Abakhayo	Khayo	Olukhayo	Busia (Nambale, Matayos)
Abasamia	Samia	Lusamia	Busia (Samia), eastern Uganda
Abatachoni	Tachoni	Lutachoni	Bungoma, Kakamega, Trans Nzoia

Each subgroup is further divided into numerous patrilineal clans, which historically regulated marriage, land rights and ritual obligations. Clans typically trace their origins to legendary ancestors, migration leaders or occupational specializations.

== Society and culture ==
Luhya elders in traditional regalia posing for a Photograph

Abaluhya
Total population
- Kenya: 6,823,482 (2019)

Regions with significant populations
- Kenya, Uganda, Tanzania

Languages
- Luhya, Swahili and English

Religion
- Christianity, African Traditional Religion

Related ethnic groups
- other Great Lakes Bantu People

- Person: OmuLuyia
- People: AbaLuyia
- Language: OluLuyia
- Country: EbuLuyia

The Luhya (also known as Abaluhyia or Luhyia) are a Bantu people and the second largest ethnic group in Kenya. The Luhya belong to the larger linguistic stock known as the Bantu. The Luhya are located in western Kenya and Uganda. They are divided into 20 (or 21, when the Suba are included) culturally and linguistically united clans. Once known as the Kavirondo, multiple small tribes in North Nyanza came together under the new name Baluhya between 1950 and 1960. The Bukusu are the largest Luhya subtribe and account for almost 30% of the entire Luhya population.

The Luhya culture is similar to the Great Lakes region Bantu speakers. During a wave of expansion that began 4,000 to 5,000 years ago, Bantu-speaking populations – as of 2023, some 310 million people – gradually left their original homeland of West-Central Africa and traveled to the eastern and southern regions of the continent. Using data from a vast genomic analysis of more than 2,000 samples taken from individuals in 57 populations throughout Sub-Saharan Africa, scientists from the Institut Pasteur and the CNRS, together with a broad international consortium, have retraced the migratory routes of these populations, previously a source of debate.

Luhya today refers to both the 20 Luhya clans and their respective Luhya dialects. There are 20 clans that make up the Luhya. The Luhya belong to the larger linguistic stock known as the Bantu. The Luhya comprise several subgroups with different but mutually understood linguistic dialects. The word “Luhya" or “Luyia" in some of the dialects means "the north.” There is no single Luhya language. Rather, there are several mutually understood dialects that are principally Bantu. Perhaps the most identifying linguistic feature of the various Luhya dialects is the use of the prefix aba- or ava-, meaning "of" or "belonging to." Thus, for example, "Abaluhya (Abaluyia)" means "people from the north." Other translations are "those of the same hearth.”

The 21 clans are the Bukusu (Aba-Bukusu), Idakho (Av-Idakho), Isukha (Av-Isukha), Kabras (Aba-Kabras), Khayo (Aba-Khayo), Kisa (Aba-Kisa), Marachi (Aba-Marachi), Maragoli (Aba-Logoli), Marama (Aba-Marama), Nyala (Aba-Nyala), Nyole (Aba-Nyole), Samia (Aba-Samia), Tiriki (Aba-Tiriki), Tsotso (Abatsotso), Wanga (Aba-Wanga), and Batura (Abatura) and the Abasiaya. They are closely related to the Masaba (or Gisu), Basamia and Banyole of Uganda, whose language is mutually intelligible with Luhya.

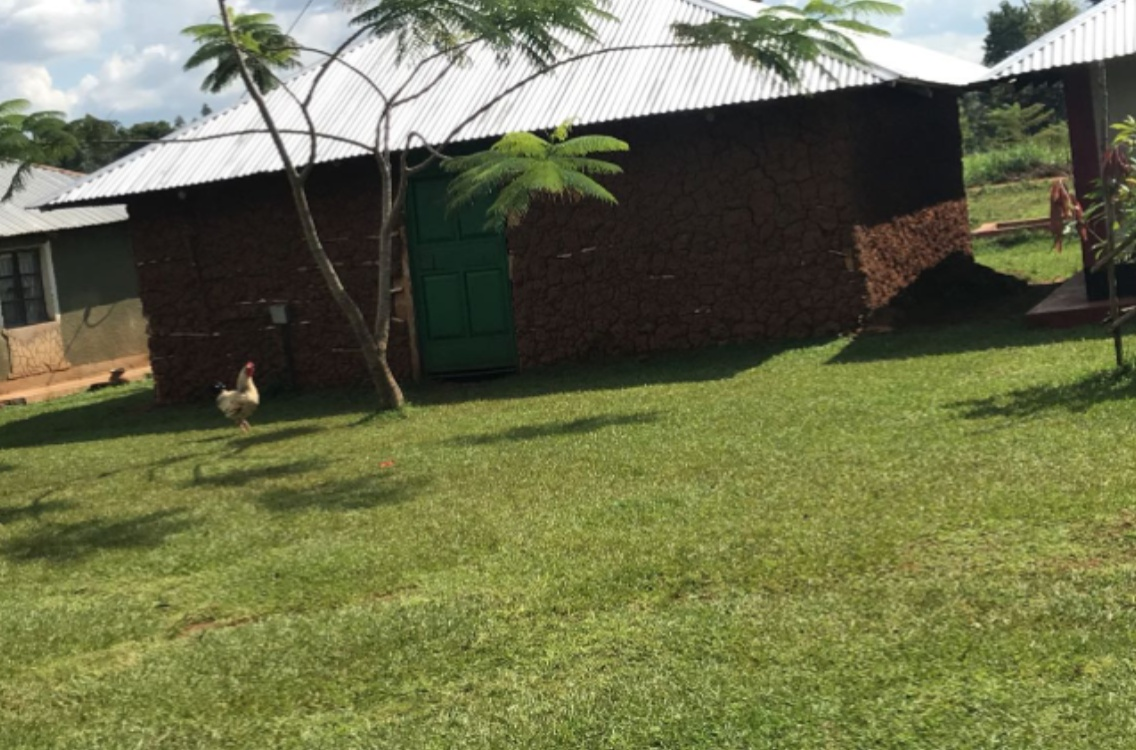
A traditional house built in rural Western Kenya famous by the Luyha community

The principal traditional settlement area of the Luhya is in what was formerly the Western province. A substantial number of them permanently settled in the Kitale and Kapsabet areas of the former Rift Valley province. The Luhya people make their home mainly in the western part of Kenya. Administratively, they occupy mostly Western province, and the west-central part of Rift Valley province. Luhya migration into the Rift Valley is relatively recent, only dating back to the first few years after independence in 1963, when farms formerly occupied by colonial white settlers were bought by, or given to Africans. Western Kenya is one of the most densely populated parts of Kenya. Migration to their present Luhyaland (a term of endearment referring to the Luhya's primary place of settlement in Kenya after the Bantu expansion) dates back to as early as the 7 BC.

Immigrants into present-day Luhyaland came mainly from eastern and western Uganda and trace their ancestry mainly to several Bantu groups, and to other non-Bantu groups such as the Kalenjin, Luo, and Maasai. By 1850, migration into Luhyaland was largely complete, and only minor internal movements occurred after that due to diseases, droughts, domestic conflicts and effects of British colonialism.

== Origins and history ==
Location of Western Province in Kenya.

=== Overview ===
Anthropologists, geneticists, and linguists have evidenced that the progenitors of the Luhya were part of the great Bantu expansion out of Central Africa. During a wave of expansion that began 4,000 to 5,000 years ago, Bantu-speaking populations – as of 2023, some 310 million people – gradually left their original homeland of West-Central Africa and traveled to the eastern and southern regions of the continent. However, the majority of the other Luhya tribe are mostly from present-day Uganda.

=== Colonial period ===
The first European the Luhya had contact with was probably Henry Morton Stanley as he voyaged around Lake Victoria. In 1883, Joseph Thomson was the first European known to pass through Luhya territory on foot, and was influential in opening the region to Europeans after his meeting with King Nabongo Mumia of the Wanga Kingdom.

Significant numbers of the Luhya fought for the British in the Second World War, many as volunteers in the Kenya African Rifles (KAR). As with many African societies, the Luhya also named their children after significant events. Consequently, many Luhya people born around the time of the Second World War were named "Keyah", a transliteration of "KAR", the acronym for the King's African Rifles.

Other famous chiefs during the colonial time included Ndombi wa Namusia, Sudi Namachanja, Namutala and Ongoma Laurende.

== Luhya clans and subclans ==
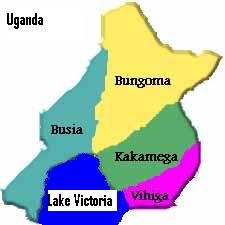
The four traditional districts of Western Province, Kenya.

Luhya tribe	Population 1999	Luhya variety	Region
Luhya	3,944,257		Busia (Kenya)
Bukusu	1,188,968	Lubukusu	Bungoma (Kenya)
Maragoli	934,926	Lulogooli	Maragoli, Vihiga (Kenya)
Nyala	227,165	Lunyala (east), Lunyala (west)	Busia (Kenya)
Kabras	136,546	Lukabarasi	Kakamega (Kenya)
Isukha	101,789	Lwisukha	Kakamega (Kenya)
Wanga	94,190	Oluwanga	Kakamega District (Kenya)
Tiriki	93,393	Lutirichi	Vihiga (Kenya)
Tsotso	92,687	Olutsotso	Kakamega (Kenya)
Tachoni	85,597	Lutachoni	Lugari, Malava (Kenya)
Samia	84,828	Lusamia	Busia (Kenya)
Khayo	68,703	Olukhayo	Busia (Kenya)
Marachi	65,633	Olumarachi/Bumarachi	Busia (Kenya)
Idakho	54,661	Lwidakho	Kakamega (Kenya)
Kisa	45,135	Olushisa	Kakamega (Kenya)
Marama	43,075	Olumarama	Kakamega (Kenya)
Nyole		Lonyole (Uganda), Olunyore (Kenya)	Vihiga (Kenya), Tororo (Uganda)

1. The Bukusu speak Lubukusu and occupy Bungoma, Mount Elgon district and Trans Nzoia. The sub-clans of the Bukusu include the Baafu, Baala, Baande, Babasaba, Babeti, Babichachi, Babiya, Baboya, Babulo, Babutu (descendants of Mubutu also found in Congo), Babuya, Bachambayi, Bachemayi, Bachemuluku, Bachemwile, Baechale, Baechalo, Baemba, Baembo, Baengele (originally Banyala), Bafisi, Bafumo, Bahongo, Bakamukong'i, Bakhisa, Bakhoma, Bakhona, Bakhone, Bakhonjo, Bakhoone, Bakhulaluwa, Bakhurarwa, Bakhwami, Bakiabi, Bakibeti, Bakikai, Bakikayi, Bakimwei, Bakobolo, Bakoi, Bakuta, Bakwangwa, Balako, Baleyi, Balisa, Baliuli, Balonja, Balukulu, Baluleti, Balunda, Balwonja, Bamakhuli, Bamalaba, Bamalicha, Bamang'ali, Bamatiri, Bameme, Bameywa, Bamuki, Bamukongi, Bamukoya, Bamula, Bamuna, Bamusomi, Bamutilu, Bamutiru, Bamwale, Bamwayi Bamwaya, Bang'oma, Bangachi, Banyangali, Banywaka, Barefu, Basaba, Basakali, Basamo, Basang'alo, Basefu, Basekese, Basenya, Basianaga, Basibanjo, Basime, Basimisi, Basioya, Basirikwa, Basombi, Basonge, Batakhwe, Batecho, Batilu, Batukwika, Batura, Bauma, Baumba, Baumbu, Baundo, Baunga, Bayaya, Bayemba, Bayonga, Bayundo, Bhakitang'a, Bhakiyabi, Bhasakha, Bhatasama, and the Bhatemlani. ISBN 978-1-4669-7837-9

2. The Maragoli speak Lulogooli and occupy Vihiga district. Maragoli sub-clans include the Avagamuguywa, Avagitsunda, Avagizenbwa, Avagonda, Avakebembe, Avakirima, Avakizungu, Avaliero, Avalogovo, Avamaabi, Avamageza, Avamaseero, Avamasingira, Avamumbaya, Avamutembe, Avamuzuzu, Avanoondi, Avasaali, Avasaki, Avasanga, Avasaniaga, Avasweta, Avavurugi, and the Avayonga.

3. The Nyala speak Lunyala and occupy Busia District. Other Nyala (Abanyala ba Kakamega) occupy the northwestern part of Kakamega District. The Banyala of Kakamega are said to have migrated from Busia with a leader known as Mukhamba. They speak the same dialect as the Banyala of Busia, save for minor differences in pronunciation. The Abanyala ba Kakamega are also known as Abanyala ba Ndombi. They reside in Navakholo Division North of Kakamega forest. Their one-time powerful colonial chief was Ndombi wa Namusia. Chief Ndombi was succeeded by his son, Andrea. Andrea was succeeded by Paulo Udoto, Mukopi, Wanjala, Barasa Ongeti, Matayo Oyalo and Muterwa in that order.

The sub-clans of the Banyala include the Ababenge, Abacharia, Abachende, Abachimba, Abadavani, Abaengere, Abahafu, Abakangala, Abakhubichi, Abakoye, Abakwangwachi, Abalanda, Abalecha, Abalindavyoki, Abalindo, Abamani, Abamisoho, Abamuchuu, Abamugi, Abamulembo, Abamwaya, Abanyekera, Abaokho, Abasaacha, Abasakwa, Abasaya, Abasenya, Abasia, Abasiloli, Abasinyama, Abasiondo, Abasonge (also found among Kabras), Abasumba, Abasuu, Abatecho (also found among Bukusu), Abaucha, Abauma, Abaumwo, Abayaya, Abayirifuma (also found among Tachoni), Abayisa, and the Abayundo.

The Banyala do not intermarry with someone from the same sub-clan.

4. The Kabras speak Lukabarasi and occupy the northern part of Kakamega district. The Kabras were originally Banyala. They reside principally in Malava, in Kabras Division of Kakamega district. The Kabras (or Kabarasi, Kavalasi and Kabalasi) are sandwiched by the Isukha, Banyala and the Tachoni.

The name "Kabras" comes from Avalasi which means 'Warriors' or 'Mighty Hunters.' They were fierce warriors who fought with the neighbouring Nandi for cattle and were known to be fearless. This explains why they are generally fewer in number compared to other Luhya clans such as the Maragoli and Bukusu.

The Kabras dialect sounds like the Tachoni dialect. Kabras sub-clans include the Abakhusia, Abamutama, Abamutsembi, Abashu, Abasira, Bachetsi, Baluu, Bamachina, Bamakangala, Basonje, and the Batobo. They were named after the heads of the families.

The Kabras were under the rulership of Nabongo Mumia of the Wanga and were represented by an elder in his Council of Elders. The last known elder was Soita Libukana Samaramarami of Lwichi village, Central Kabras, near Chegulo market. When the Quaker missionaries spread to Kabras they established the Friends Church (Quakers) through a missionary by the name of Arthur Chilson, who had started the church in Kaimosi, in Tiriki. He earned a local name, Shikanga, and his children learned to speak Kabras as they lived and interacted with the local children.

5. The Isukha speak Lwisukha and occupy the eastern part of Kakamega district. They were under the leadership of Nkotsi Liyami Makaka Shitsuxane of Mahalia clan. Son of Nkotsi Lijoodi Makaka, son of Nkotsi Liyami Makaka Muchina (Nkotsi signifies the title for a subtribal king of Luhya people. Other dialects say Ngochi or Nkochi or Nkozi). Isukha sub-clans include the Abakhaywa, Abakhonyi, Abakhulunya, Abakondi, Abakusi, Abamahalia, Abamakhaya, Abamironje, Abarimbuli, Abasaiwa, Abasaka- Ia, Abashilukha, Abashimutu, Abashitaho, Abasikhobu, Abasiritsa, Abasuiwa, Abatecheri, Abaterema, Abatsunga, Abatura, Abayokho, Abayonga, Abichina, Abimalia, Abitsende, Bakhumbwa, and the Baruli.

6. The Wanga speak Oluwanga and occupy Mumias and Matungu Districts. The 22 Wanga sub-clans are Ababere, Ababonwe, Ababule, Abachero, Abakhami, Abakolwe, Abakulubi, Abaleka, Abalibo, Abambatsa, Abamulembwa, Abamuniafu, Abamurono, Abamwende, Abamwima, Abang’ale, Abang’ayo, Abashibe, Abashieni, Abashikawa, Abashitsetse, and the Abatsoye.

7. The Tiriki speak Ludiliji and occupy Tiriki in Vihiga district. Tiriki sub-clans include the Badura, Baguga, Bajisinde, Balukhoba, Balukhombe, Bam'mbo, Bamabi, Bamiluha, Bamuli, Barimuli, Bashisungu, Basianiga, and the Basuba.

8. The Tsotso speak Olutsotso and occupy the western part of Kakamega district. Tsotso sub-clans include the Abamweche, Abangonya, Abashibo, and the Abashisiru.

9. The Tachoni speak Lutachoni and occupy Lugari, Trans-Nzoia, Likuyani, Bungoma and Malava districts. Tachoni sub-clans include the Abaabichu, Abaabichwa, Abaabiya, Abachambai, Abacharia, Abachewa, Abachikha-Abakobolo, Abachimuluk, Abachivino, Abaengele, Abakabini, Abakamlevi, Abakamutebi, Abakubwayi, Abakuusi, Abalugulu, Abaluu, Abamakhanga, Abamakhuli, Abamalicha, Abamarakalu, Abameywa, Abamua, Abamuhonngo-, Abamurundi, Abamweya, Abangachi, Abanyang'ali, Abarefu, Abasamba, Abasamo, Abasang'alo, Abasaniaka, Abasioya, Abasonge/Abasonje, Abatecho, Abawande, and the Abayumbu.

The Saniaga sub-clan found among the Maragoli in Kenya and the Saniak in Tanzania are said to have originally been Tachoni. The Bangachi found among Bagisu of Uganda, and Balugulu, also found in Uganda and the Bailifuma, found among the Banyala are also said to have been originally Tachoni.

10. The Samia speak Lusamia and occupy Southern Region of Busia District (Busia county), Kenya. The sub-clans of the Samia of include the Ababiang'u, Ababukaki, Ababuri, Abadongo, Abadulu, Abajabi, Abakangala, Abakhino, Abakhoba, Abakhulo, Abakhwi, Abakweri, Abalala, Abanyiremi, Abasonga, and the Abatabona.

11. The Khayo speak Lukhayo and occupy Nambale District and Matayos Division of Busia County, Kenya. Khayo sub-clans include the Abaguuri, Abakhabi, and the Abasota.

12. The Marachi speak Lumarachi and occupy Butula District in Busia county. Marachi sub-clans include the Ababere, Ababirang'u, Ababonwe, Ababule, Abade, Abafofoyo, Abakolwe, Abakwera, Abaliba, Abamalele, Abamuchama, Abamucheka, Abamulembo, Abamurono, Abamutu, Abang'ayo, Abapwati, Abarano, Abasimalwa, Abasubo, Abasumia, Abatelia, and the Abatula. The name Marachi is derived from Ng'ono Mwami's father who was called Marachi son of Musebe, the son of Sirikwa. So all the Marachi sub-clans owed their allegiance to Ng'ono Mwami from whose lineage of Ababere sub-clan they were founded. The name Marachi was given further impetus by the war-like lifestyle of the descendants of Ng'ono who ruthlessly fought off the Luo expansion of the Jok Omollo a Nilotic group that sought to control the Nzoia and Sio Rivers in the area and the fishing grounds around the gulf of Erukala and Ebusijo-modern Port Victoria and Sio Port respectively.

13. The Idakho speak Lwidakho and occupy the southern part of Kakamega district. Their sub-clans include the Abamahani, Abamasaba, Abamuhali, Abamusali, Abangolori, Abashiangala, Abashikulu, and the Abashimuli.

14. The Kisa speak Olushisa and occupy Khwisero district. Kisa sub-clans include the Ababoli, Abachero, Abakambuli, Abakhobole, Abakwabi, Abalakayi, Abalukulu, Abamanyulia, Abamatundu, Abamurono, Abaruli, Abashirandu, and the Abashirotsa.

15. The Marama speak Lumarama and occupy Butere Sub-county. Marama sub-clans include the Abacheya, Abageri (Luo origin), Abakara, Abakhuli, Abakokho, Abakolwe (origin from Wanga), Abalukokho, Abamachina, Abamani, Abamatioli (origin from Butsotso), Abamatundu, Abamukhula, Abamumbia, Abang'onya (origin from Butsotso), Abanyukhu, Abasete, Abashieni, Abashikalie, Abashirotsa, Abashitsaha, Abashitsetse (origin from Wanga), Abatayi, Abatere, Abatsotse, Abebokolo, and the Aberecheya. (History of Abaluyia-Gideon Were)

16. The Nyole speak Olunyole and occupy Bunyore in Vihiga district. Nyole sub-clans include the Abakanga, Abakhaya, Abalonga, Abamukunzi, Abamuli, Abamutete, Abanangwe, Abasakami, Abasiekwe, Abasikhale, Abasiloli, Abasiralo, Abasiratsi. Abamang’ali, Abasubi (Abasyubi), Abatongoi, Abayangu, Aberranyi, and the Ab’bayi.

== Population and politics ==
In Kenyan politics, the Luhya population, commonly referred to as the Luhya vote in an election year, was usually a deciding factor in the outcome of an election. The community was known to unite and vote as a block usually for a specific political candidate without division of mind and regardless of political differences. However, since the March 2013 general elections, this was proved wrong. They are now known to accept different ideologies. Politicians scramble for the Luhya vote since it is the most democratic voter in Kenya. Given their high population numbers, a political candidate who enjoys Luhya support is almost always poised to win the country's general elections, barring incidents of fraud. The community is thereafter "rewarded" politically, by one of their own being appointed vice president or to a high-profile political office by the winning candidate. In the 2002 general elections of Kenya, the Luhya proved this point when outgoing president Daniel Arap Moi appointed Musalia Mudavadi as vice president in an attempt to lure Luhyas to vote for Uhuru Kenyatta, his choice of successor with Musalia as running mate. The Luhyas remained adamant in their support for the opposition then led by Mwai Kibaki who also had a Luhya, Michael Kijana Wamalwa as running mate. The Luhyas dealt a severe blow to Moi's candidate by voting en masse for Kibaki who thereafter won the election with Wamalwa as his vice president. Of the eleven vice presidents of Kenya since independence, three have been Luhyas.

Others who have held high-profile political offices include, Musalia Mudavadi, current deputy Prime Minister formerly 7th Vice President (Sept. 2002 – Dec 2002), Michael Wamalwa Kijana, 8th Vice President of Kenya (January 2003 – August 2003), Moody Awori, 9th Vice President of Kenya (September 2003 – January 2008), Amos Wako, longest-serving Attorney General of Kenya - 19 years in office, Kenneth Marende, Speaker of the National Assembly and Zachaias Chesoni, late former Chief Justice of Kenya.

Although Trans Nzoia is in the Rift Valley province, substantial Luhya populations have settled in the Kitale area.

== Culture ==
Luhya culture is comparable to most Bantu cultural practices. Polygamy was a common practice in the past. Today, with the influence of Christianity, it is practiced by only a few people, usually, if the man marries under traditional African law or Muslim law. Civil marriages (conducted by government authorities) and Christian marriages preclude the possibility of polygamy.

About 10 to 15 families traditionally made up a village, headed by a village headman (Omukasa). Oweliguru is a title for a village leader coined from the English word "Crew." Within a family, the man of the home was the ultimate authority, followed by his first-born son. In a polygamous family, the first wife held the most prestigious position among women.

The first-born son of the first wife was usually the main heir to his father, even if he happened to be younger than his half-brothers from his father's other wives. Daughters had no permanent position in Luhya families as they would eventually become other men's wives. They did not inherit property and were excluded from decision-making meetings within the family. Today, girls are allowed to inherit property, in accordance with Kenyan law.

Children are named after the sub-clan's ancestors, usually after their grandparents, and after acts of nature like the weather etc. The paternal grandparents take precedence so that the first-born son will usually be named after his paternal grandfather (Kuka or 'Guga' in Maragoli) while the first-born daughter will be named after her paternal grandmother ('Kukhu' or 'Guku' in Maragoli.)

Subsequent children may be named after maternal grandparents, after significant events, such as the weather at the time of birth, seasons, etc. The name Wafula, for example, is given to a boy born during the rainy season (ifula or efula). Wanjala is given to one born during famine (injala or enjala to mean 'hunger').

Traditionally, they practiced arranged marriages. The parents of a boy would approach the parents of a girl to ask for her hand in marriage. If the girl agreed, negotiations for dowry would begin. Typically, this would be 12 cattle and similar numbers of sheep or goats, to be paid by the groom's parents to the bride's family. Once the dowry was delivered, the girl was fetched by the groom's sisters to begin her new life as a wife.

Instances of eloping were and are still common. Young men would elope with willing girls, with negotiations for a dowry to be conducted later. In such cases, the young man would also pay a fine to the parents of the girl. Abductions are normal. From December 2019 through June 2020, Human Rights Watch interviewed 37 people about the kidnappings, including 28 female survivors of sexual violence, 5 of whom were children at the time of the abuse. As polygamy is allowed, a middle-aged man will typically have two to three wives.

When a man got very old and handed over the running of his homestead to his sons, the sons would sometimes find a young woman for the old man to marry. Such girls were normally those who could not find men to marry them, usually because they had children out of wedlock. Wife inheritance was and is still, though rare, practiced.

A widow would normally be inherited by her husband's brother or cousin. In some cases, the eldest son would inherit his father's widows (though not his own mother). Modern-day Luhyas do not practice some of the traditional customs as most have adopted a Christian way of life. Many Luhyas live in towns and cities for most of their lives and only return to settle in the rural areas after retirement or the death of parents.

They had extensive customs surrounding death. There would be a great celebration at the home of the deceased, with mourning lasting up to forty days. If the deceased was a wealthy or influential man, a big tree would be uprooted and the deceased would be buried there. After the burial, another tree Mutoto, Mukhuyu or Mukumu would be planted. (This was a sacred tree and is found along most Luhya migration paths it could only be planted by a righteous lady mostly a virgin or a very old lady.)

Nowadays, mourning takes less time (about one week) and the celebrations are held at the time of burial. "Obukoko" and "Lisabo" are post-burial ceremonies held to complete mourning rites.

Animal sacrifices were traditionally practiced. There was great fear of the "Abalosi" or "Avaloji" (witches) and "Babini" (wizards). These were "night-runners" who prowled in the nude running from one house to another casting spells.

=== Religious conversion ===
Most modern-day Luhyas are Christians; for some (if not all) the word for God is Nyasaye or Nyasae (Were Khakaba).

The word Nyasae when translated into English roughly corresponds with Nya (of) and Asae/ Asaye/ Sae/ Saye (Prayer). The Luhya traditionally worshiped an ancient 'god' of the same name (commonly known as Isis, or Were Khakaba. When Christianity was re-introduced to the Luhya in the early 1900s by Christian missionaries from Europe and America, the Luhya peoples took the name of their traditional god, Nyasae, and gave that name to the Living Abrahamic God.

The first Luhyas who were converted to Christianity took words, names, their perceptions of what Christian missionaries told them about the Christian God, and other aspects of their indigenous religious traditions, and applied them to their interpretations of Christ and God.

The Friends Church (Quakers) opened a mission at Kaimosi and the Church of God took over the mission in Bunyore. During the same period, the Catholic order Mill Hill Brothers came to the area of Mumias. The Church of God of Anderson, Indiana, US, arrived in 1905 and began work at Kima in Bunyore. Other Christian groups such as the Anglicans (CMS) came in 1906. In 1924 the Pentecostal Assemblies of Canada began their work in Nyan'gori. The Salvation Army came to Malakisi in 1936. The Baptists came to western Kenya in the early 1960s.

The first Bible translation in a Luyia language was produced by Nicholas Stamp in the Wanga language. Osundwa says he did this translation in Mumias, the former capital of the Wanga kingdom of Mumia.

A religious sect known as Dini ya Msambwa was founded by Elijah Masinde in 1948. They worship "Were," the Bukusu god of Mt. Elgon, while at the same time using portions of the Bible to teach their converts. They also practice traditional arts referred to by some as witchcraft. This movement originally arose as part of an anti-colonial resistance.

Various sources estimate that 75%-90% profess Christianity.

=== Initiation ===
With the smugglers of the Marama and Saamia, male circumcision was practiced. A few sub-ethnic groups practiced clitoridectomy but, even in those, it was limited to a few instances and was not as widespread as it was among the Agikuyu. The Maragoli did not practice it at all. Outlawing of the practice by the government led to its end, even though it can occur among the Tachoni.

Traditionally, circumcision was part of a period of training for adult responsibilities for the youth. Among those in Kakamega, the initiation was carried out every four or five years, depending on the clan. This resulted in various age sets notably, Kolongolo, Kananachi, Kikwameti, Kinyikeu, Nyange, Maina, and Sawa in that order.

The Abanyala in Navakholo initiate boys every other year and notably on even years. The initiates are about 8 to 13 years old, and the ceremony was followed by a period of seclusion for the initiates. On their coming out of seclusion, there would be a feast in the village, followed by a period of counselling by a group of elders.

The newly initiated youths would then build bachelor-huts for each other, where they would stay until they were old enough to become warriors. This kind of initiation is no longer practiced among the Kakamega Luhya, with the exception of the Tiriki.

Nowadays, the initiates are usually circumcised in hospital, and there is no seclusion period. On healing, a party is held for the initiate — who then usually goes back to school to continue with his studies.

Among the Bukusu, the Tachoni and (to a much lesser extent) the Nyala and the Kabras, the traditional methods of initiation persist. Circumcision is held every even year in August and December (the latter only among the Tachoni and the Kabras), and the initiates are typically 11 to 15 years old.

=== Seers ===
- Maina wa Nalukale,
- Mutonyi wa Nabukelembe (He was speared by the Nandi across River Nzoia after he visited his relatives)
- Wachiye Wa Naumbwa
- Elija Masinde wa Nameme

=== Food and agriculture ===
The main food for the Luhya people like most Kenyans is ugali (made from maize/sorghum flour) served with vegetables and meat of cattle, goat, fish or chicken; hence food production in the region is targeted to meet this need. The lower counties of Vihiga, Kakamega and Busia grow substance crops of maize on their low acreage plots, they raise chicken and keep cattle. The Upper parts of Bungoma and the Kitale grow large scale maize and produce milk from dairy cows. Fish farming is also practiced, on a small scale, producing farm-raised tilapia for consumption. Busia, Mumias and lower Bungoma produce cassava and millet. There is normally a maize supply deficit in the production seasons and at the start of the year and a surplus supply during the harvest months resulting in much lower prices to producers during harvest and very high prices to consumers during production months. The producer and consumer may be the same person in different months and this has seen households opt for other foods during maize shortages. The largest sugar production facilities in Kenya are located in the western region where the Luhya people predominantly live. Mumias Sugar Company, Kabras Sugar Company and Nzoia Sugar Company have their contract production zones in the Luhya peoples region. Sugarcane farming has reduced due to challenges in the sugar industry with Mumias sugar struggling to stay afloat and companies having debts. In Vihiga and some areas of Kakamega, tea bushes are very visible, making tea another key commercial crop grown in this region.

=== Social organization ===
Traditionally, Luhya communities were organized around extended patrilineal households clustered into villages of about ten to fifteen homesteads. The homestead (olukoba or similar terms) usually belonged to a senior man, his wife or wives, their married sons and their families. The compound layout reflected seniority, with the main house, wives' houses, sons' houses and cattle kraal placed according to local norms.

Village life was governed by elders' councils that mediated disputes, arranged initiation ceremonies, settled bridewealth negotiations and oversaw communal rituals. Age sets provided another layer of organization, especially among groups such as the Bukusu and Tachoni where circumcision cohorts (for example Kolongolo, Kananachi, Kikwameti, Kinyikeu, Nyange, Maina, Sawa) structured male social life.

=== Family, marriage and inheritance ===
Marriage historically involved the transfer of cattle, goats or other livestock as bridewealth from the groom's family to the bride's family. Arranged marriages were common, although elopement and love matches also occurred. Polygyny was an accepted ideal for men of sufficient means, though in practice most men had one or two wives.

Inheritance of land and livestock generally followed patrilineal principles, with the eldest son of the first wife enjoying a privileged position. Daughters traditionally did not inherit land, though constitutional and legal reforms in Kenya have increasingly opened inheritance rights to women.

=== Initiation and age sets ===
Male circumcision is a central rite of passage among many Luhya subgroups. Among the Bukusu, Tachoni, Kabras and parts of Nyala and Samia, circumcision ceremonies are still conducted in designated seasons in even numbered years, accompanied by singing, drumming, dancing and ritual seclusion. Among other Luhya groups, circumcision has largely moved to clinical settings but remains an important life stage marker.

Female genital cutting historically occurred only in a few Luhya communities and was never as widespread as among some neighboring peoples such as the Agikuyu. It has declined sharply following state bans, health campaigns and changing social attitudes.

=== Religion ===
Precolonial Luhya religious thought centered on belief in a supreme being often called Nyasaye or Were, associated with the sky, fertility and moral order, alongside ancestral spirits and a range of spirits linked to places, rain, healing and misfortune. Ritual specialists, seers and diviners mediated between communities and the spirit world.

Christian missions, especially Friends (Quaker), Church of God, Anglican and Catholic, spread rapidly in the twentieth century, and today an estimated majority of Luhya people identify as Christian, divided among Catholic, mainline Protestant, Pentecostal and African initiated churches. Minority communities maintain traditional religious practices or participate in movements such as Dini ya Msambwa, which blend Christian and indigenous elements and historically expressed resistance to colonial and postcolonial authority.

Belief in witchcraft, night runners and spirit possession remains part of everyday discourse in some areas and coexists with Christian and Islamic practices.

=== Material culture, dress and regalia ===
Traditional Luhya architecture in rural areas often features rectangular or circular houses with earthen walls and thatched roofs, arranged around an open courtyard. Granaries for storing grain are raised on stilts to protect against pests and moisture.

Ceremonial regalia for elders, ritual specialists and dancers includes skin capes, beadwork, cowrie shells, iron bells, ankle rattles, walking sticks and distinctive headdresses. During contemporary cultural festivals, circumcision seasons and weddings, performers often wear a synthesis of older regalia and modern fabrics in the colors of the Kenyan flag or county sports teams.

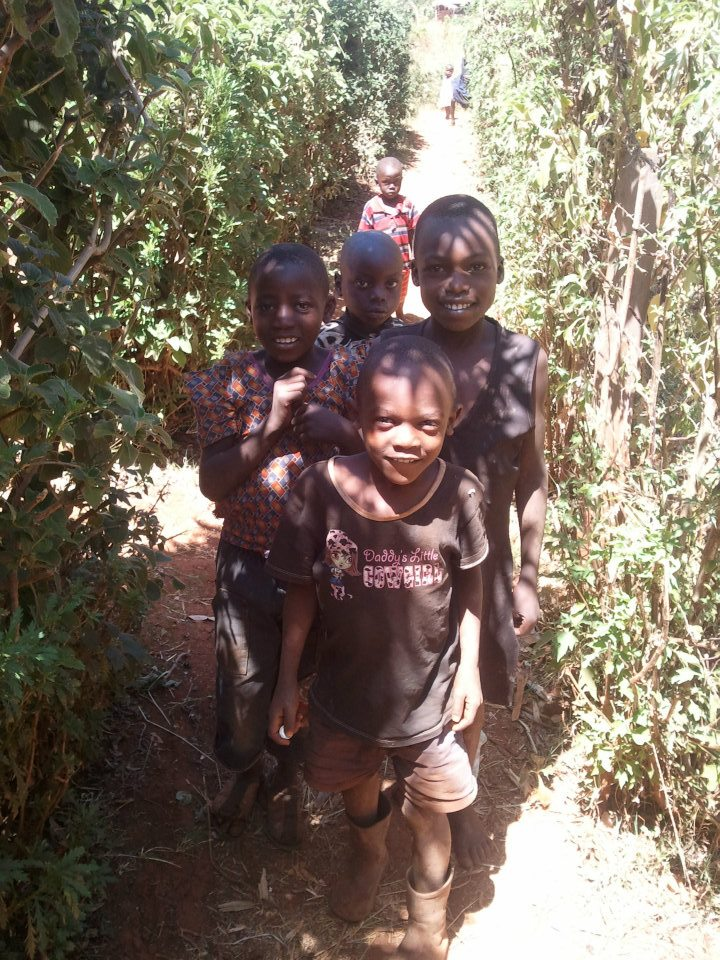
Luhya schoolchildren in western Kenya. Contemporary dress is similar to that of other Kenyan communities, with traditional regalia reserved mainly for ritual and festive occasions.

=== Music, dance and sport ===
Music and dance are integral to Luhya social life. Isukuti drumming ensembles from the Isukha and Idakho, for example, are widely known in Kenya for their fast paced rhythms performed at weddings, funerals and political rallies. Other genres include benga guitar styles from Bukusu and Maragoli areas and church choirs that blend local harmonies with global hymnody.

Western Kenya has also produced many prominent footballers, runners and rugby players, helped by the popularity of school competitions and community clubs such as Abaluhya Football Club, later renamed A.F.C. Leopards.

== Economy ==
Historically, most Luhya households combined subsistence farming with small scale trade and wage labor. Maize, beans, cassava, sorghum, millet and vegetables are staple crops, while cattle, goats and chickens provide meat, milk and income. Chicken, often prepared as "ingokho" (chicken stew), is widely considered a delicacy and symbol of hospitality.

From the colonial period through the late twentieth century, sugarcane became a major cash crop in parts of Kakamega, Bungoma and Busia, supplying factories such as Mumias, Nzoia and West Kenya sugar companies. Tea production expanded in parts of Vihiga and Kakamega, while dairy farming grew in higher altitude zones of Bungoma and Trans Nzoia.

Labor migration has long been a key livelihood strategy, with Luhya men and women working as teachers, civil servants, traders, industrial workers and informal sector operators in Nairobi, Mombasa and other towns and sending remittances back to rural homes. In recent decades, international migration to the Gulf states, Europe and North America has also grown.

== Notable Luhya people and people of Luhya descent ==
Notable people

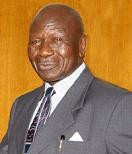
Moody Awori
9th Vice President of Kenya

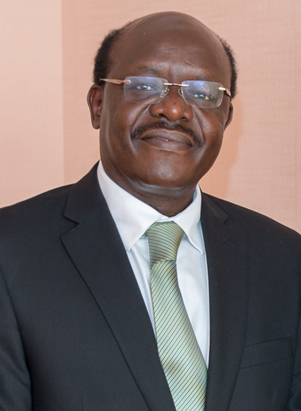
Mukhisa Kituyi
Secretary-General of the United Nations Conference on Trade and Development

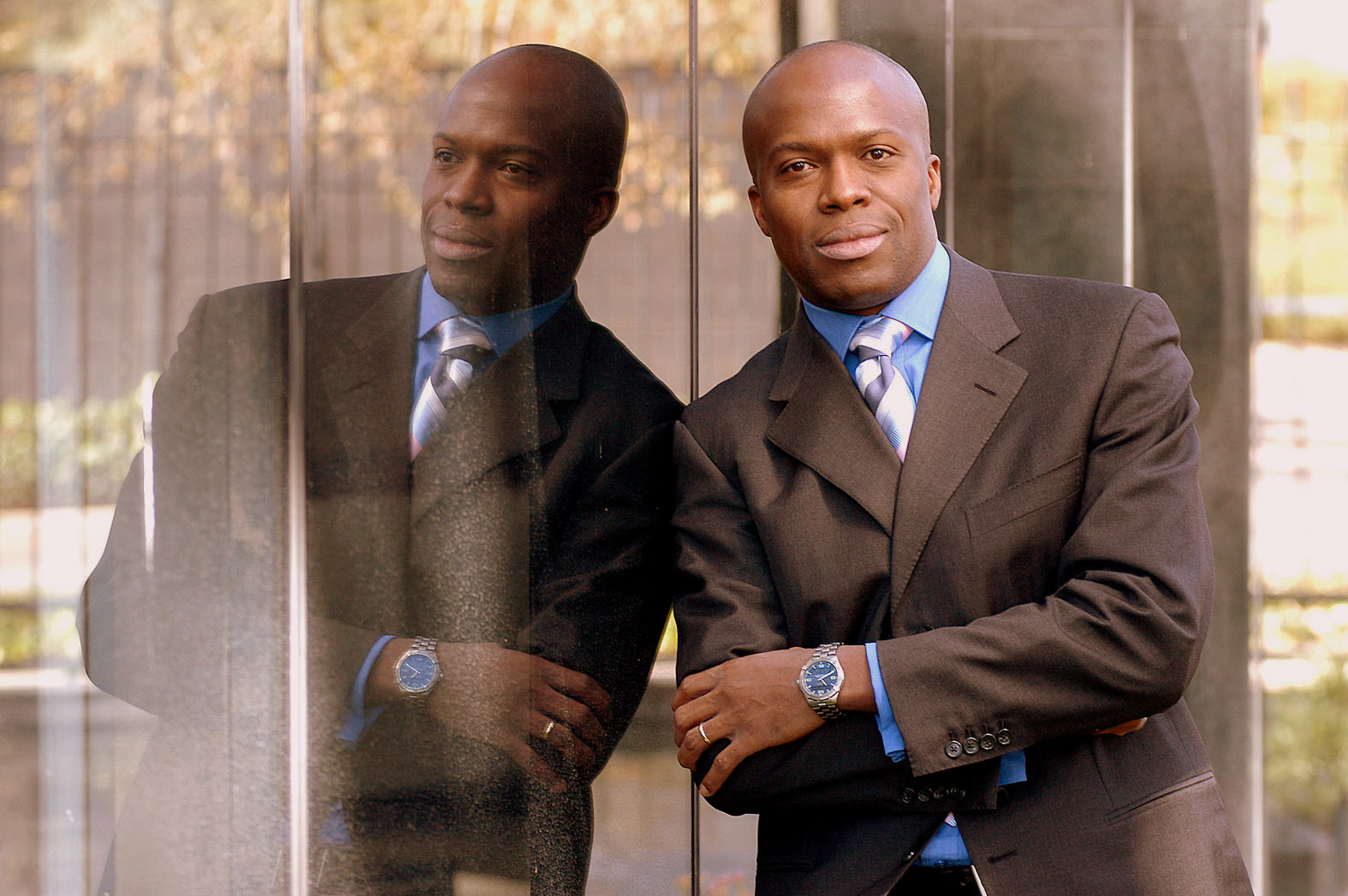
Ayisi Makatiani
Corporate executive

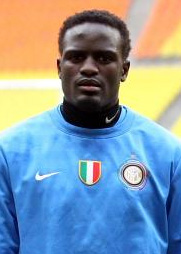
McDonald Mariga
Professional footballer

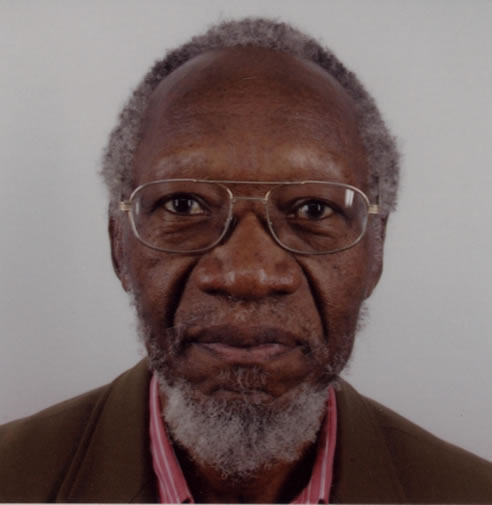
Hilary Ng'weno
Historian and veteran journalist

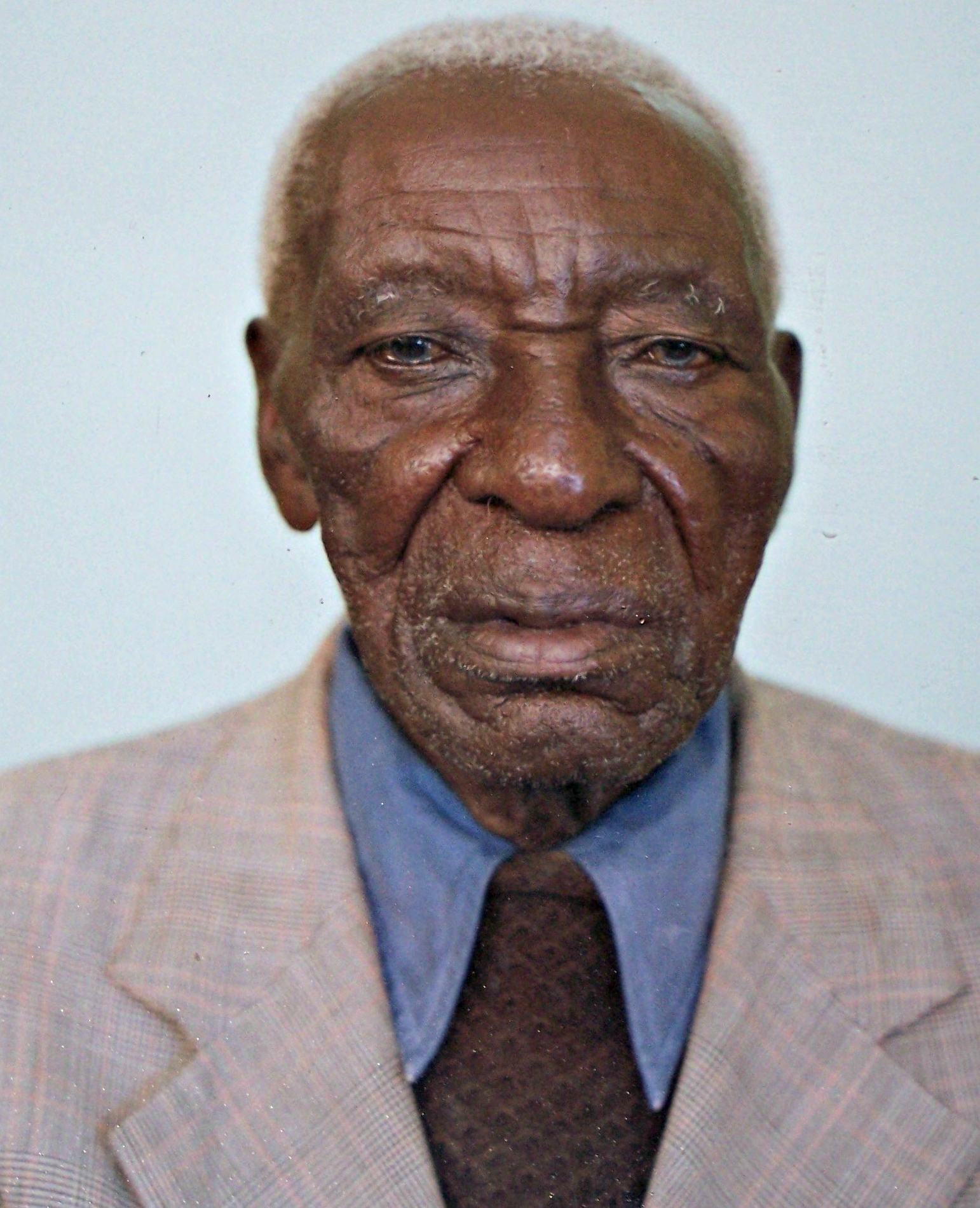
Esau Khamati Oriedo
Anti-colonial activist and politician

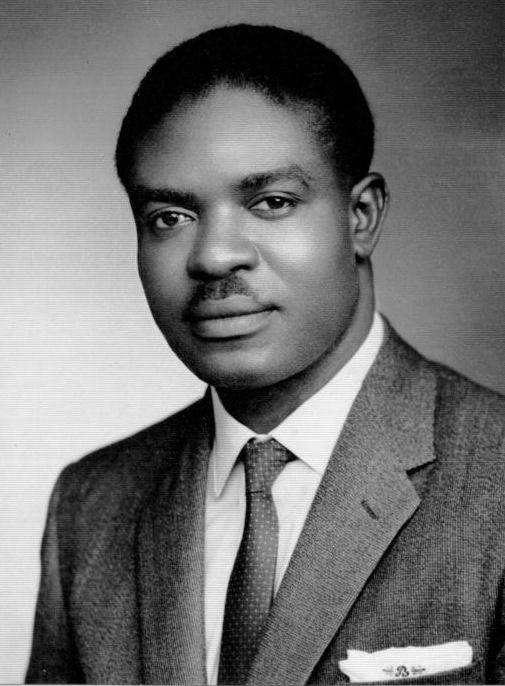
Dr. Blasio Vincent Oriedo
Pioneering Epidemiologist

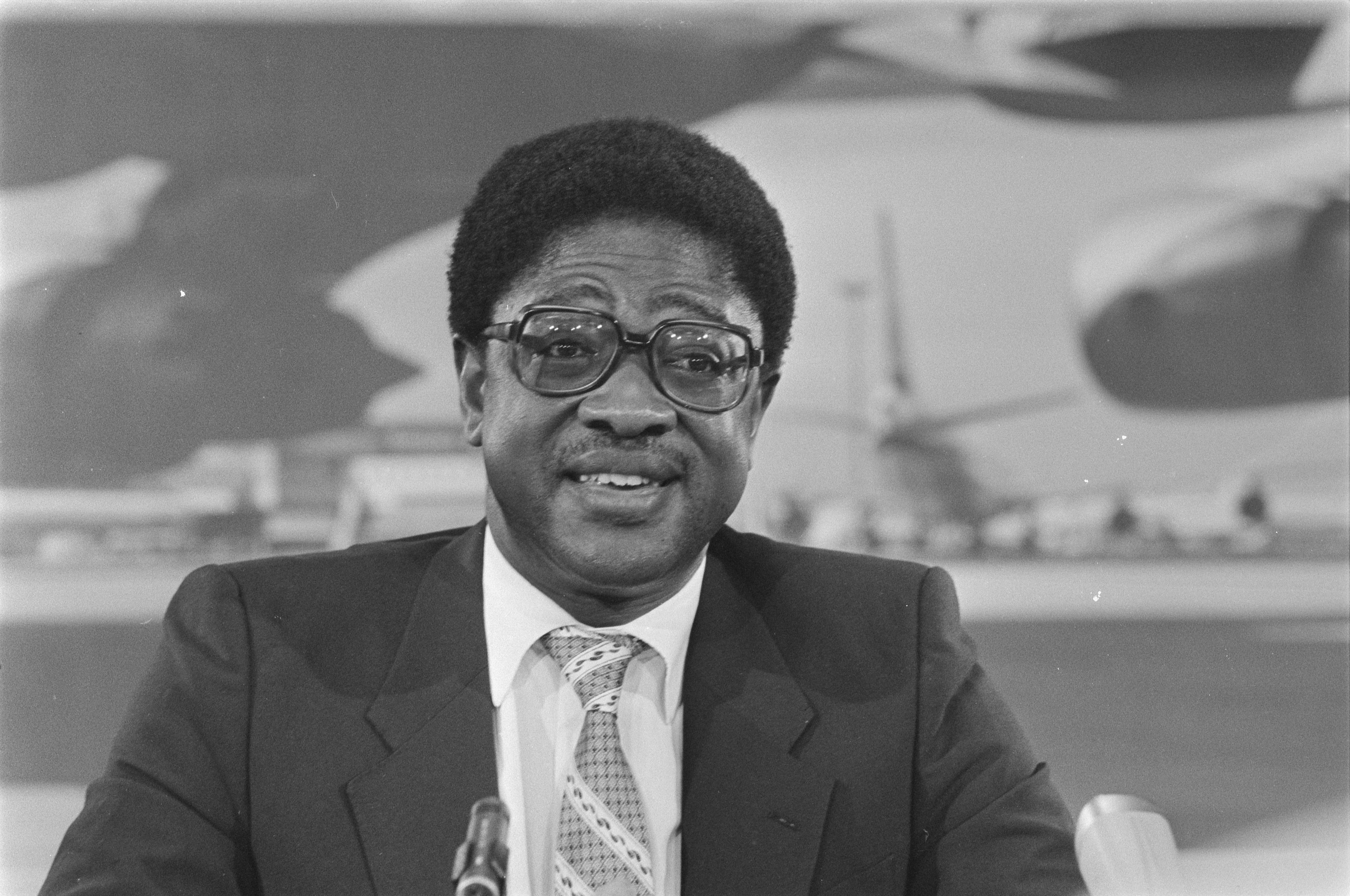
Amos Wako
Kenyan Senator. Former Attorney General

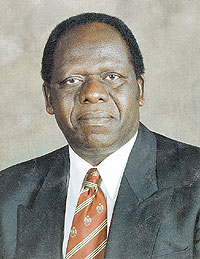
Michael Wamalwa
8th Vice President of Kenya

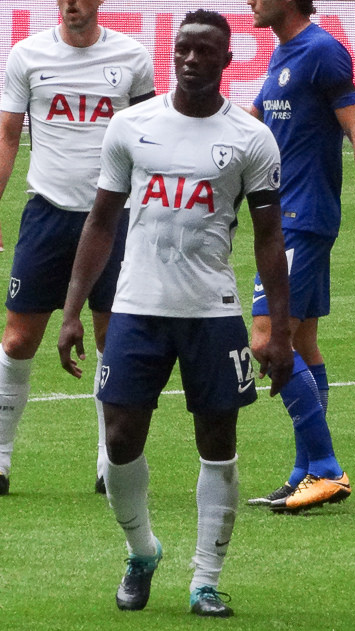
Victor Wanyama
Professional footballer

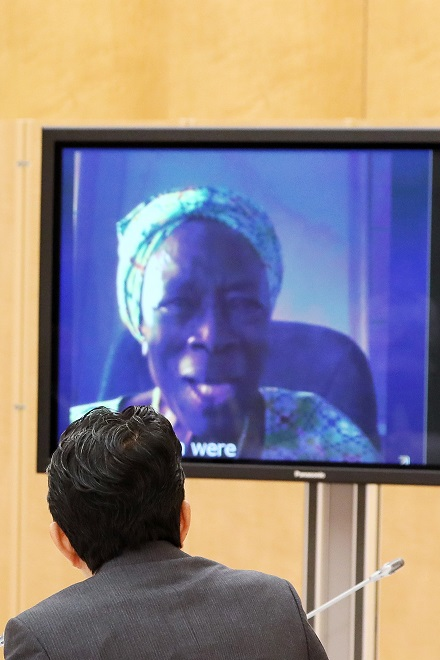
Miriam Were
Academic and Author. Winner of the first Hideyo Noguchi Africa Prize.

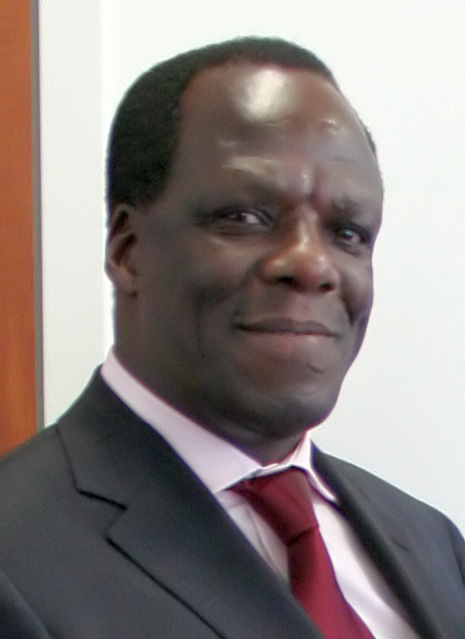
Wycliffe Oparanya Governor of Kakamega County

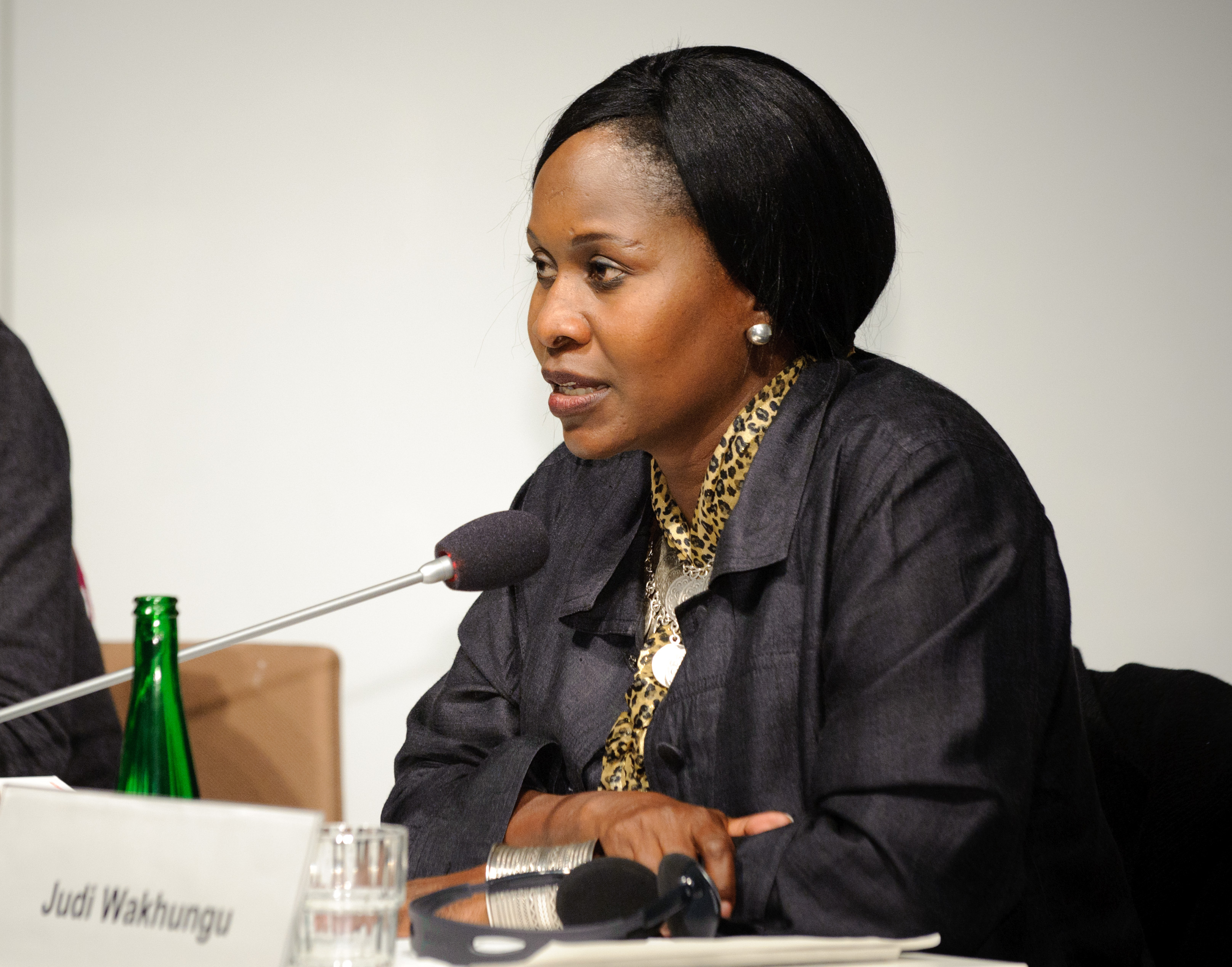
Judy Wakhungu, Kenyan Ambassador to France

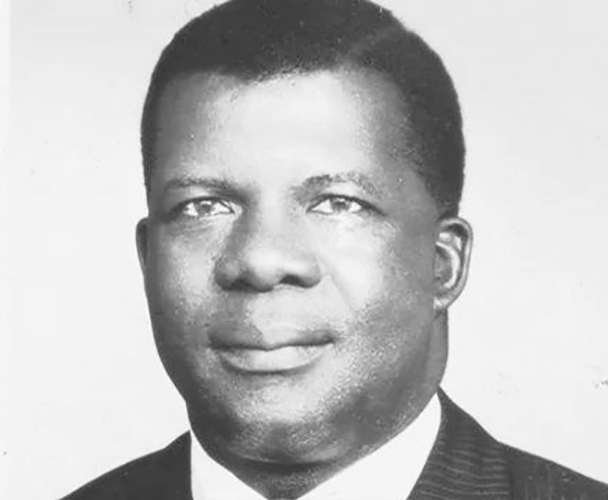
Eric Edward Khasakhala

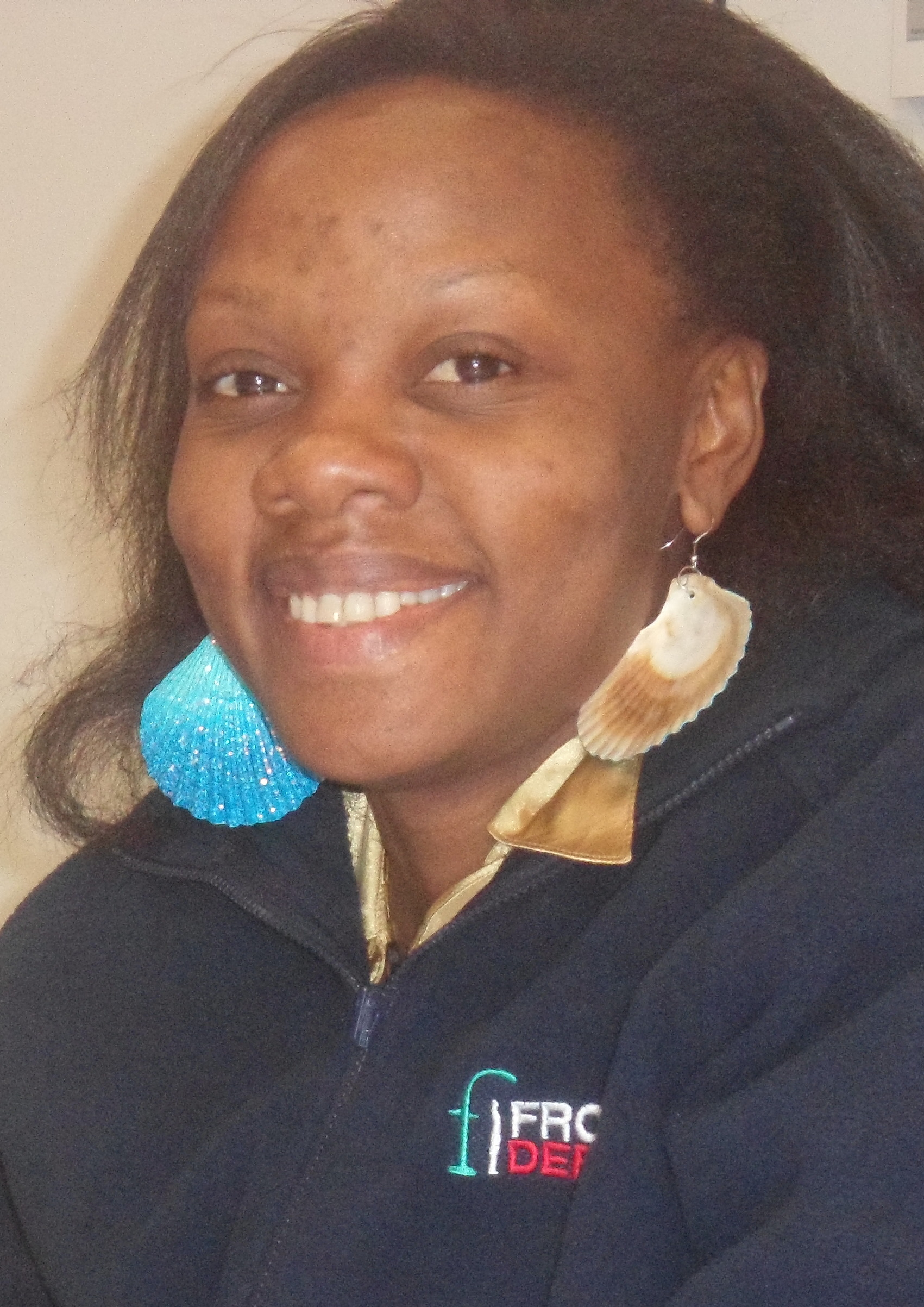
Phyllis Omido, Kenyan environmental activist.

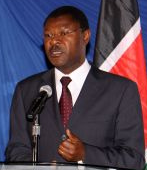
Moses Wetangula, Former Minister of Foreign Affairs and Bungoma Senator.

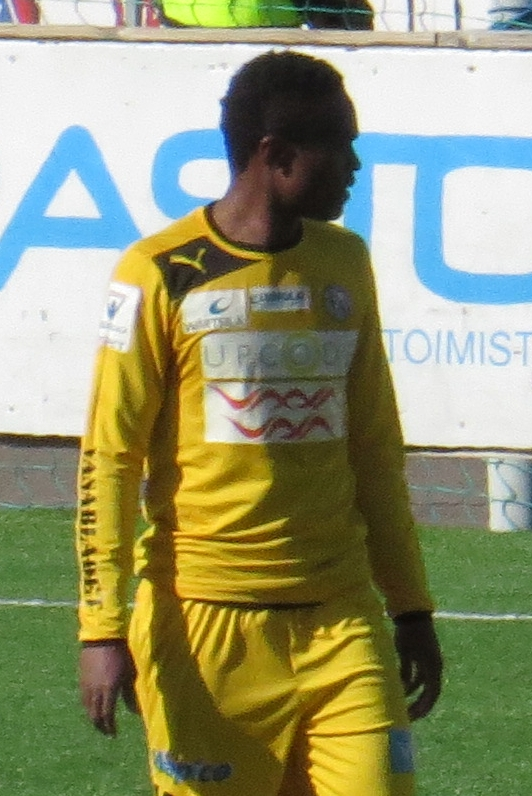
Clifton Miheso, Kenyan Footballer

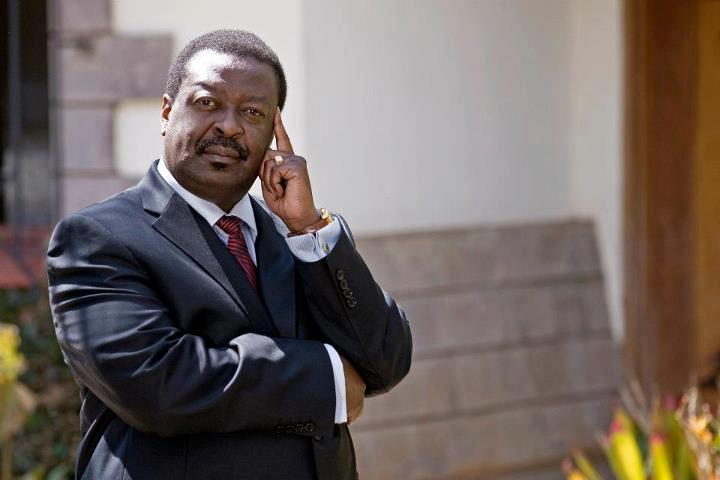
Musalia Mudavadi, Prime Cabinet Secretary of Kenya
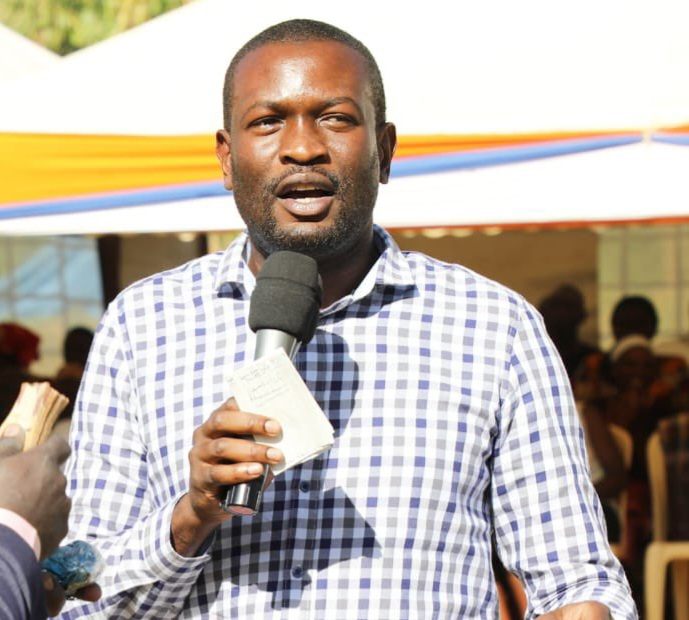
Edwin Sifuna, Nairobi Senator

=== Politics, activism, diplomacy and law ===
- Francis Atwoli, trade unionist and long serving secretary general of the Central Organization of Trade Unions (COTU)
- Moody Awori, ninth Vice President of Kenya
- Aggrey Awori, Ugandan politician and former cabinet minister
- Nancy Makokha Baraza, first Deputy Chief Justice of Kenya
- Zacchaeus Chesoni, former Chief Justice of Kenya
- Cyrus Jirongo, businessman and politician
- Mukhisa Kituyi, former Secretary General of the United Nations Conference on Trade and Development
- Musikari Kombo, former cabinet minister and party leader
- Kenneth Marende, former Speaker of the National Assembly of Kenya
- Musalia Mudavadi, Prime Cabinet Secretary of Kenya and former vice president
- Masinde Muliro, independence era politician and minister
- Nabongo Mumia, king of the Wanga kingdom and early colonial collaborator
- Ababu Namwamba, Kenyan politician and cabinet secretary
- Burudi Nabwera, diplomat and politician
- Phyllis Omido, environmental activist and Goldman Environmental Prize winner
- Paul Otuoma, governor of Busia County and former cabinet minister
- Wycliffe Oparanya, former governor of Kakamega County and chair of the Council of Governors
- Martin Shikuku, veteran politician and former leader of the opposition
- Edwin Sifuna, Nairobi County senator and party secretary general
- Amos Wako, long serving Attorney General of Kenya and former senator
- Moses Wetangula, Speaker of the National Assembly of Kenya and former foreign minister
- George Wajackoyah, lawyer and 2022 presidential candidate
- Michael Wamalwa, former Vice President of Kenya under Mwai Kibaki and Member of Parliament

=== Academics, medicine and science ===
- Laban Ayiro, academic and vice chancellor of Daystar University
- Calestous Juma, professor of the practice of international development at Harvard University
- Francis D Imbuga, playwright and literature scholar
- Filemona F Indire, professor, diplomat and former member of parliament
- Susane Nabulindo, consultant anesthesiologist
- Catherine Nyongesa, radiation oncologist and founder of Texas Cancer Centre in Nairobi
- Nanjala Nyabola, writer and political analyst
- Ken Walibora, novelist and Kiswahili scholar
- Gideon Were, historian and professor
- Miriam Were, public health physician and recipient of the first Hideyo Noguchi Africa Prize
- John Nikola Bwire Osogo, historian and educationist
- Blasio Vincent Oriedo, epidemiologist and researcher in tropical medicine

=== Arts, music and media ===
- Bien-Aimé Baraza, member of the band Sauti Sol
- Daudi Kabaka, benga musician
- Elsa Majimbo, comedian and social media personality
- Pamella Makotsi-Sittoni, journalist and editor
- Gloria Muliro, gospel musician
- Azziad Nasenya, actress and media personality
- Hilary Ng'weno, historian and journalist
- Nonini, musician
- Winfred Adah Omwakwe, Miss Earth 2002
- Daddy Owen, gospel musician
- Khadambi Asalache, poet and artist
- Willy Paul, musician

=== Religion ===
- Festo Habakkuk Olang', first African Archbishop of the Anglican Church of Kenya
- Maurice Michael Otunga, Catholic cardinal
- Eliud Wabukala, former Anglican Archbishop of Kenya and chair of the Ethics and Anti Corruption Commission
- Joseph W. Sitati, general authority of the Church of Jesus Christ of Latter day Saints

=== Sports ===
- Anne Wafula Strike, Paralympic wheelchair racer
- Allan Wanga, footballer
- Ayub Masika, footballer
- Benjamin Ayimba, rugby player and coach
- Biko Adema, rugby union player
- Brian Tanga, professional rugby player
- Collins Injera, rugby sevens player
- Clifton Miheso, footballer
- Dennis Abukuse, rugby player
- Emmanuel Wanyonyi, middle-distance athlete
- Ferdinand Omanyala, sprinter and African record holder in the 100 metres
- Humphrey Kayange, rugby player
- Josephat Ababu, cricketer
- Johnstone Olindi, rugby professional
- Joe Kadenge, footballer
- Joe Masiga, footballer and doctor
- Kevin Wekesa, professional rugby player
- McDonald Mariga, footballer and politician
- Paul Wekesa, tennis player
- Paul Were, footballer
- Patrick Odongo, rugby professional
- Robert Wangila, Olympic boxing champion
- Violet Barasa, volleyball player
- Victor Wanyama, footballer
- Vincent Onyala, professional rugby player
- Willy Ambaka, rugby player

== See also ==
- Luhya languages
- Western Province (Kenya)
- Ethnic groups of Kenya
- A.F.C. Leopards
