= Busia District, Kenya =

Former district in Kenya

Coordinates: 0°26′N 34°9′E

{{Busia District was an administrative district in the Western Province of Kenya. It bordered Kakamega District to the east, Bungoma District and Teso district to the north, Busia District, Uganda, to the west, and Lake Victoria to the south.

In 1956, Elgon Nyanza District was split from North Nyanza District. The new district was headquartered at Bungoma. In 1963, the district was split into two districts: Bungoma and Busia, all within Western Province.

Though most residents of Busia District are ethnically Luhya, there is also a substantial population of Luo and Iteso residents.

The district had a total population of 370,608, without the Teso District, in the 1999 census. By 2005, Busia had been split into five districts: Busia, Bunyala, Samia, Teso North, and Teso South; all with a combined population of 743,946.

In 2010, after the promulgation of the new constitution of Kenya, counties were to be created based on the districts of Kenya as at 1992. This effectively led to the creation of Busia County.

Local authorities (councils)
Authority	Type	Population*	Urban pop.*
Busia	Municipality	44,766	30,777
Funyula	Municipality	18,043	1,242
Nambale	Town	26,168	1,005
Port Victoria	Town	18,472	5,917
Busia County	County	263,159	5,516
Total	-	370,608	44,457
* 1999 census

Administrative divisions
Division	Population*	Urban pop.*	Headquarters
Budalangi	53,356	5,417	
Butula	95,489	4,805	Butula
Funyula	73,875	1,106	Funyula
Matayos	56,186	0	Matayos
Nambale	67,544	0	Nambale
Township	25,158	15,695	Busia
Total	370,608	27,022	-
* 1999 census

Busia district had four constituencies:

- Nambale Constituency
- Butula Constituency
- Funyula Constituency
- Budalangi Constituency
