= Idakho-Isukha-Tiriki language =

Bantu dialect group of Kenya

Idakho-Isukha-Tiriki
- Luidakho, Luisukha, Lutirichi
- Native to: Kenya
- Ethnicity: Idakho, Isukha, Tiriki
- Native speakers: 600,000 (2009 census)
- Language family: Niger–Congo?: Atlantic–Congo; Volta-Congo; Benue–Congo; Bantoid; Southern Bantoid; Bantu; Northeast Bantu; Great Lakes Bantu; Masaba-Luhya; Idakho-Isukha-Tiriki

Language codes
- ISO 639-3: ida
- Glottolog: idak1243
- Guthrie code: JE.411–413

Idakho, Isukha, and Tiriki (Luidakho, Luisukha, Lutirichi) are dialects of a Kenyan language within the Luhya ethnic group. They are a set of languages closely related to some other Luhya ethnic groups like Maragoli, but less so in comparison to others, like Bukusu, Tachoni or Samia.

== Dialects ==
=== Tiriki ===
Tiriki, or known by the autoglossonym Lutirichi, is a language variety spoken in western Kenya and eastern Uganda within the Luyia language family. It is the southeasternmost of the Luyia dialects, spoken primarily in Hamisi Constituency in Vihiga County, Western Province, Kenya. As reported in the 15th edition of the Ethnologue, a 1980 survey by Bernd Heine and Wilhelm Möhlig estimated there to be 100,000 speakers of Tiriki. The 17th edition of the Ethnologue indicates a Tiriki-speaking population of 210,000 based on the 2009 Kenyan census, which surveyed ethnicity not language.

== Phonology ==
Consonants
| | Labial | Alveolar | Palatal | Velar | Glottal |
|---|---|---|---|---|---|
| Plosive | p | t | | k | |
| Prenasalized | ᵐb | ⁿd, ⁿz | ⁿdʒ | ᵑg | |
| Affricate | | ts | tʃ | | |
| Fricative | f, β | s | ʃ | | h |
| Nasal | m | n | ɲ | ŋ | |
| Approximant | w | l | j | | |

Vowels
| | Front | Central | Back |
|---|---|---|---|
| High | i | | u |
| Near-high | ɪ | | ʊ |
| Mid | e | | o |
| Low | | a | |
