= Khayo language =

Bantu language of Kenya

Khayo
- Olukhayo
- Native to: Kenya
- Region: Busia District
- Ethnicity: Khayo tribe (Luhya)
- Native speakers: 130,000 (2009 census)
- Language family: Niger–Congo?: Atlantic–Congo; Benue–Congo; Bantoid; Bantu; Northeast Bantu; Great Lakes Bantu; Masaba–Luhya (J.30); Khayo

Language codes
- ISO 639-3: lko
- Glottolog: khay1238
- Guthrie code: JE.341

Khayo (Xaayo) is a Bantu language spoken by the Luhya people of Kenya.
