= Mudavadi =

Mudavadi is a surname. Notable people with the surname include:

- Moses Mudavadi (1923–1989), Kenyan politician
- Musalia Mudavadi (born 1960), Kenyan politician, son of the above
