= Isukha =

Tribe of the Luhya nation in Kenya

The Isukha, are a tribe of the Luhya nation of Kenya. Among the Luhya, the Isukha are known as Abiisukha. They reside Kakamega District neighboured by the Idakho and the Tiriki. They perform the traditional celebratory dance known as Isukuti.

== See also ==
- Idaxo-Isuxa-Tiriki language
- Luhya people
