= Nyole tribe =

The Nyole, also known as Nyore, are a tribe of the Luhya nation from Bunyore in Western Kenya. The AbaNyole are a Luhya subethnic group that speaks Oluluyia, a form of Luhya language which they have historically claimed is "standard".

In Swahili, they are known as Wanyore

Some prominent Nyore leaders include:

- Kenneth Marende the Former Speaker of the National Assembly of Kenya's 10th Parliament. He was elected as Speaker on January 15, 2008.
- Wilberforce Otichilo Current governor vihiga County
- Jacqueline Ingutiah Commissioner Judicial Service Commission

== See also ==
- Luhya people
- Luhya languages
