= Samia language =

Bantu language spoken in Uganda and Kenya

Samia
- Olusaamia
- Native to: Uganda, Kenya
- Region: Busia District and Busia County
- Ethnicity: Abasamia
- Native speakers: 480,000 (2002 & 2009 censuses)
- Language family: Niger–Congo?: Atlantic–Congo; Volta-Congo; Benue–Congo; Bantoid; Southern Bantoid; Bantu; Northeast Bantu; Great Lakes Bantu; Masaba–Luhya; Luhya; Samia
- Dialects: Samia; Songa (?)

Language codes
- ISO 639-3: lsm
- Glottolog: saam1283
- Guthrie code: JE.34,343

Samia (Saamia) is a Bantu language spoken by the Luhya people of Uganda and Kenya. Ethnologue includes Songa as a dialect, but it may be a separate language.

== See also ==
- Luhya language
