= Khayo =

Abakhayo

Regions with significant populations
- Kenya (Busia County)

Languages
- Olukhayo (Luhya language)

Related ethnic groups
- Luhya people, Tiriki people, Maasai people, Bagisu people, Nandi people, Itso people, Basoga people

The Khayo is a sub tribe of the Luhya people of Kenya. They reside in Busia County, by the Kenya-Uganda border. Their Luhya neighbors are the Samia, Marachi, Wanga and Bukusu. The Bakhayo border the Bukusu on the East, the Republic of Uganda and Samias on the West, the Marachi on the South and the Wanga on the South East. On their north, they are bordered by the Iteso, a non-Luhya Nilotic people of Kenya.

Abakhayo are one of the four Luhya sub tribes living in Busia County. The people are referred to as Abakhayo; their geographical location, Ebukhayo and their language, olukhayo. They share linguistic, cultural and historical value systems with Abamarachi, Abasaamia and Abanyala neighbours. Ebukhayo covers an area that comprises two constituencies each represented by an elected member of the national assembly in the Kenyan parliament. The two constituencies are Nambale and Matayos. Major trade centers in Bukhayo are Busia town, Nambale, Matayos, Mungatsi, Busibwabo, Buyofu, Lupida, Tangakona and Mabunge. The Khayo clans include 'Baguri, Bakhabi, Bamenya, Bakangala, Bakhero, Baamani, Bamwaka, Batsoe, Bamudiru, Bamukwe, Bakimo, Bakhone, Bachabe, Barunga, Bamakunda, Bakhadonyi, Bakholo, Bakhibe, Babulwa, and Babwibo, '. The Baguri, Bamenya, Bakhero, Bakimo and Bachabe came together from Ibanda to Bukhayo and were the first ones to arrive in Bukhayo. The Bakhabi ( Kwavi Maasai) were fought and driven away from Narok to Sang'alo by the three other major sub groups of the Maasai ( Siria, Moi Tanik and Mburu) assisted by Kipsigis in the late 1600s. Kwavi Leybons prophesied to the rests of the Kwavi in early 1700s that other Maasai are approaching and advised them to move further away. The large group moved southwards to Singida Province in Tanzania and the smaller group moved westwards to Dadira in Uganda in early 1700s. The group that had gone to Dadira is the one that came to Abakhayo ( at Namahindi) in mid 1700s and were welcomed by Khayo leader and agreed to be assimilated by Abakhayo. Khayo leader assigned them a living space at current Matayos from where they stayed and later spread in other regions of Khayo chieftainship. Abakhabi, we are Maasai Kwavi ( Maasai original). The Bakhone came from Mukono in Busoga. The Baamani broke away from the Bamulembo in Port Victoria before migrating to Bukhayo. The Barunga broke away from the Nandi of Kolo and Nyang'ori. The Bakunda broke away from the Nandi and migrated to Bukhayo. The Bakangala were originally Bagisu and migrated from Mt Elgon to Bukhayo. The Bamudiru were originally Bagisu. The Bakhadonyi came from Bunyala(Port Victoria). The Bakholo came from Bukholo. The Batsoe, Bakhibe, Bamukwe and Bamwaka broke away from the Tiriki. From the days of the ancestors, it was decreed that, one was not allowed to marry from his clan or that of his mother. Children belonged to their father's clan.

The Khayo sub tribe is named after Were Mukhayo, who led Abakhayo from Busoga to Ibanda. Were Mukhayo was a son to Kintu who died in Busoga. Were Mukhayo died in Ibanda, Uganda. Were Mukhayo's son, Mudoro, is the one who led Bakhayo from Ibanda to Kenya. Mudoro died in Bukhayo and was succeeded by his son, Khachio as the leader of Bakhayo. Khachio died in Bukhayo and was succeeded by his son, Dindi the 1st as the ruler of Bukhayo. Dindi the first died in Bukhayo and was succeeded by his son, Ndubi as the ruler of Bakhayo. Ndubi died in Bukhayo and was succeeded by his son Dindi the 2nd as the ruler of Bukhayo. Dindi the 2nd died in Bukhayo and was succeeded by his son Odanga as the ruler of Bukhayo. However, Odanga's reign as the ruler of Bukhayo was short-lived. Odanga's brother, Okwara, succeeded him as the ruler of Bukhayo. Okwara was succeeded by his son, Hezekiah Wamurua as the ruler of Bukhayo. Hezekiah Wamurua was the last traditional chief to rule over Bukhayo. His son, Christopher Makokha Wamurua was the first Member of Parliament for Busia East, which is the present day Nambale, Matayos and Butula constituencies.

== Notable members ==
Among this community, some great professionals and national leaders have emerged. Kenya's longest serving Attorney General and former Senator Busia County Hon. Amos Wako, current MP for Nambale Hon John Sakwa Bunyasi, who also served the World Bank in Washington for many years before venturing into politics, former high school principal and current MP for Matayos Hon Godfrey Odanga, former Nambale MPs who also served as cabinet ministers in the Ministry of labour, Energy and Finance; Hon. Philip Masinde and Hon. Chrysanthus Barnabas Okemo, former Managing Director, Kenya National Assurance Company (KNAC), Ernest Bunyasi, the former Law Society of Kenya (LSK) chairman Mr. Kenneth Akide, Gervase B. K. Akhaabi lawyer by trade and member of the East African Legislative assembly, Hilary T. Akhaabi, PhD, renowned scholar Prof. Okumu Bigambo, Former Permanent Secretary Engineer David Stower Ndubi, Kenyatta University Mathematician Dr. George X. Stower (Ph.D.), former General Manager of National Irrigation Board Engineer Dan Barasa. Other great professionals from the Khayo sub tribe include long serving Central Bank of Kenya, senior research officer, former tender board chairman for Mumias Sugar Company Ltd Maurice Robert Juma, civil society activist and current Senator of Busia County, Hon. Okiya Omutatah Okoiti, former University Student Leader Michael Ingwe Odanga Nangira, Computer scientist Ikhabi Sakwa Sienko and Ignatius Lumala Wandera, a young and renowned scholar. Dr. Doreen Alice Maloba Othero, a renowned regional Public Health expert, from the Baguri clan. Amos Wako, Philip Masinde, the former MP, and Ignatius Lumala Wandera are from Bakhabi clan. The late Mark Radoli former general manager car and general industrial area.

== See also ==
- Luhya people
- Luhya languages
- Matayos
