= Marachi language =

Bantu language of Kenya

Marachi
- Olumarachi
- Native to: Kenya
- Region: Busia County
- Ethnicity: Marachi tribe (Luhya)
- Native speakers: 160,000 (2009 census)
- Language family: Niger–Congo?: Atlantic–Congo; Benue–Congo; Bantoid; Bantu; Northeast Bantu; Great Lakes Bantu; Masaba–Luhya (J.30); Marachi

Language codes
- ISO 639-3: lri
- Glottolog: mara1393
- Guthrie code: JE.342

Marachi is a Bantu language spoken by the Luhya people of Kenya.
