= Maragoli =

Kenyan people

The Maragoli, or Logoli (Ava-Logooli), are now the second-largest ethnic group of the 6 million Luhya nation in Kenya, numbering around 2.1 million, or 15% of the Luhya people according to the last Kenyan census. Their language is called Logoli, Lulogooli, Ululogooli, or Maragoli. The name Maragoli probably emerged later on or after interaction of the people with missionaries of the Quaker Church.

Maragoli also refers to the area that the descendants of a man called Mulogooli (also known as Maragoli) settled and occupied in the thirteenth century AD in the vast lands of vihiga county. Maragolis occupy the largest part of vihiga followed by Abanyore and Tiriki sub tribes. Maragoli clans include the va- masingira, Vakizungu, Va-Mavi, Va-Sachi, Va-Saniaga, Va-Vulughi, Va-Ndega, Va-sari, Va-ng'ang'a, Va-Suva, Va-Yonga, va-twa, va-gisemba... (The prefix Va- refers to the people or descendants, and is sometimes written as Ba-, Ava-, or Aba-.)

Maragolis have a unique culture that is rather simple but complex to other Luhya subtribes. The Lulogooli dialect is not easily understood by other Luhya subtribes, but Maragolis literally understand most of the languages in Luhya land. Many Maragolis have migrated to other areas due to land scarcity and have formed settlements in Trans Nzoia and Lugari Districts. Because Maragolis value their lineage, they have transferred their own local names to the places they have currently occupied, so as to preserve their identity. They also name their children after their ancestors.

== Culture ==
Luhya culture is comparable to most Bantu cultural practices. Polygamy was a common practice in the past but today, it is only practised by a few people. However, the Avalogooli people were traditionally monogamous like the patriarch Mulogooli. Marriage was especially significant for young men as they were not allowed to own property before marriage.

About 10 to 15 families traditionally made up a village, presided by a village headman –Omukasa or Liguru. Liguru/riguru means 'the hearer/ear' – as such a ligutu can judge. Within a family, the man of the home was the ultimate authority, followed by his first-born son. In a polygamous family, the first wife held the most prestigious position among women.

The first-born son of the first wife was usually the main heir to his father, even if he happened to be younger than his half-brothers from his father's other wives. Daughters had no permanent position in Luhya families as they would eventually become other men's wives. They did not inherit property, and were excluded from decision-making meetings within the family. Today, women can inherit property and often make decisions on behalf of their families as per the judgement of Kenyan law and individual families.

Children are named after the clan's ancestors, or after their grandparents, or after events or the weather. The paternal grandparents take precedence, so that the first-born son will usually be named after his paternal grandfather (guka/guga), while the first-born daughter will be named after her paternal grandmother (Kukhuu).

Subsequent children may be named after maternal grandparents or after significant events. Some Maragoli names have particular meanings whereas others do not. For instance, names like Injugu (born during groundnut harvesting), Kabwoni (born during sweet potato harvesting) and Anzala (born during extreme drought) have meanings. Other names like Afandi, Inziria, Mwachi, Aliviza and Asava have no known meaning. Names of events are also common. For example, Imbarambara (born during road construction), Msuruve (born when a white missionary called Miss Reeves first came to Maragoli land) and Sirinji (born when money was first introduced in the land).

Traditionally, Luhyas practised arranged marriage. The parents of a boy would approach the parents of a girl to ask for her hand in marriage. If the girl agreed, negotiations for dowry would begin. Typically, this would be 12 cattle and similar numbers of sheep or goats, to be paid by the groom's parents to the bride's family. Once the dowry was delivered, the girl was fetched by the groom's sisters to begin her new life as a wife.

Instances of eloping were and are still common. Young men would elope with willing girls, with negotiations for dowry to be conducted later. In such cases, the young man would also pay a fine to the parents of the girl. In rare cases abductions were normal but the young man had to pay a fine. As polygamy was allowed, a middle-aged man would typically have 2 to 3 wives.

When a man got very old and handed over the running of his homestead to his sons, the sons would sometimes find a young girl for the old man to marry. Such girls were normally those who could not find men to marry them, usually because they had children out of wedlock. Wife inheritance was and is also practised. A widow would normally be inherited by her husband's brother or cousin. Today, wife inheritance is uncommon to non-existent.

In some cases, the eldest son would also inherit his father's widows (though not his own mother). Modern day Luhyas do not practice some traditional customs as most have adopted the Christian way of life. Many Luhyas also live in urban towns and cities for most of their lives and only return to settle in the rural areas after retirement or the death of parents in the rural areas.

The Luhya had extensive customs surrounding death. There would be a great celebration at the home of the deceased, with mourning lasting up to forty days. If the deceased was a wealthy or influential man, a big tree would be uprooted and the deceased would be buried there. After the burial another tree, mukumu, would be planted. This was a sacred tree and is found along most Luhya migration paths; it could only be planted by a righteous woman, typically a virgin or an elderly woman).

Nowadays, mourning takes shorter periods of time (about one week) and the celebrations are held at the time of burial. Ovogogo and rovego are post-burial ceremonies held to complete mourning rites.

Animal sacrifices were also traditionally practised. There was great fear of the avaroji (witches) and babini (wizards). These were "night-runners" who prowled in the nude, running from one house to another casting spells.

Most modern day Luhyas are Christians and for some, if not all, the word for God is Nyasaye or Nyasae.

The word Nyasae when translated into English roughly corresponds with Nya (deity's name) and -saye(the one I beseech / pray to);from the Luhya word 'khusaya / gusaya' which means to pray. The Luhya traditionally worshipped a god of the same name. When Christianity was first introduced in the early 1900s by various Christian missionaries from Europe and America, the Luhya took the name of their traditional god, Nyasaye and gave that name to the Christian god. The first Luhyas who were converted to Christianity took words that defined some aspects of their religious traditions and applied them to Christ and the Christian god.

The Friends Church (Quakers) opened a mission at Kaimosi and the Church of God of Anderson, Indiana, USA, took over the mission in Bunyore. During the same period the Catholic order Mill Hill Brothers came to the area of Mumias. The Church of God arrived in 1905 and began work at Kima(Kima hills dedicated place where traditional spiritualists used to offer semi-annual offerings in form of cattle sacrifice to Nyasaye before the missionaries) in Bunyore. Other Christian groups such as the Anglicans (CMS) came in 1906. In 1924 the Pentecostal Assemblies of Canada began their work in Nyan'gori. The Salvation Army came to Malakisi in 1936. The Baptists came to western Kenya in the early 1960s.

The first Bible translation in the Luhya language was produced by Nicholas Stamp in the Wanga dialect. Osundwa says he made this translation in Mumias, the former capital of the Wanga kingdom of Mumia. There has been a strong Christian witness among the Luhya in the twentieth century. A religious sect known as Dini ya Msambwa was founded by Elijah Masinde in 1948. They worship Were, the god of Mount Elgon (known ethnically as Mt.Masaaba), while at the same time using portions of the Bible to teach their converts. They also practice traditional arts, termed African Spirituality. The movement originally arose as part of anti-colonial resistance and a want to move back to their original ways.

Various sources estimate that the Luhya are 75–90% professing Christians.

=== Other Luhya initiation ===
The Luhya, except for the Marama and Saamia, practised male circumcision. The Maragoli did not practice clitoridectomy.

Traditionally, circumcision was a period of training for adult responsibilities for the youth. This was a transition from childhood to adulthood. Among the Kakamega Luhya, circumcision was carried out every four or five years, depending on the clan. This resulted in various age sets, notably Kolongolo, Kananachi, Kikwameti, Kinyikeu, Nyange, Maina, and Sawa in that order.

The Abanyala living in Navakholo have an initiation of their young boys every other year, notably an even year. The initiates were about 8 to 13 years old, and the ceremony was followed by a period of seclusion for the initiates. On their coming out of seclusion, there would be a feast in the village, followed by a period of counselling by a group of elders.

The newly initiated youths would then build bachelor huts for each other called simba or esimba where they would stay until they were old enough to become warriors. This kind of initiation is no longer practised among the Kakamega Luhya, except for the Tiriki. Nowadays, the initiates are usually circumcised in hospital for health reasons and there is no seclusion period. On healing, a party is held for the initiate – who then usually goes back to school to continue with his studies. Among the Bukusu, the Tachoni and to a much lesser extent the Nyala and the Kabras, the traditional methods of initiation persist. Circumcision is held every even year in August and December (the latter only among the Tachoni and the Kabras), and the initiates are typically 11 to 15 years. Traditions have however changed with the dynamics of life, and currently, like most communities in Kenya, boys are initiated at the time the parent feels appropriate and is now usually done during infancy with symbolic rites of passage during their preteen years.

== Economic activities ==
The Luhya are traditionally agriculturalists, and they grow different crops depending on the region. Close to Lake Victoria known to them as Inyancha or Nyanza, the Saamia are mainly fishermen and traders, with their main agricultural activity being the growing of cassava. The Bukusu and the Wanga are mainly cash crop farmers, raising sugar cane in the Bungoma and Mumias areas respectively. The Bukusu also farm wheat in the region around Kitale. The Isukha of Kakamega area and the Maragoli of Vihiga raise tea, while the rocky land of the Nyore is used to harvest stones and gravel for construction. In Bukura area, the Khisa are small scale and only subsistence maize farmers. They also rear cattle, sheep, goats and chicken on a small scale. The Kabras of Malava area mainly grow maize at subsistence levels, with a few also farming sugar cane.

With the rapid modernisation of Kenya, many young Luhya people have emigrated to Nairobi and other towns in search of work.

== See also ==
- Luhya languages
- Luhya people
- Maragoli Cultural Festival
- Mbale Kenya
