= Abdul Majid Cockar =

9th Chief Justice of the Republic of Kenya (1936–1997)

Chief Justice of Kenya
- In office 1994–1997
- Preceded by: Fred Kwasi Apaloo
- Succeeded by: Zacchaeus Chesoni

Personal details
- Born: 3 February 1923 Amritsar, Punjab, British India
- Died: 31 October 2016 (aged 93) Nairobi, Kenya
- Relatives: Saeed Cockar (brother)
- Education: Post Graduate Teachers Diploma in Education (UK); Post Graduate Diploma in Law (UK)
- Occupation: Lawyer, Judge
- Known for: Chief Justice of Kenya (1994–1997)

Abdul Majid Cockar (3 February 1923 – 31 October 2016 ) was a Kenyan lawyer and the Chief Justice of Kenya. He served from 1994 to 1997 and was succeeded by Zacchaeus Chesoni.

He was born in Amritsar, Punjab, British India. In 1938 he passed the Senior Cambridge Examination and joined the Kenya Department of Education as a teacher. He moved to the United Kingdom and completed the Post Graduate Teachers Diploma in Education in 1945. The following year he completed the Post Graduate Diploma in Law. He returned to Kenya in 1953 and enrolled as an advocate of the High Court of Kenya. The same year he set up the law firm Cockar & Cockar Advocates with his younger brother Saeed.

He was appointed a Senior Resident Magistrate in 1961 and Chairperson of the Rent Restriction Tribunal in 1974. He was later made a Judge of the High Court and Court of Appeal. In 1994 he was made Chief Justice of Kenya, serving until his retirement in 1997.

In 2012 he published his memoirs 'Doings, Non-doings and Mis-doings'. Cockar died at the age of 93 on 31 October 2016 in Nairobi.

== See also ==
- Chief Justice of Kenya
- Court of Appeal of Kenya
- High Court of Kenya
