= Shinyalu =

Town in Kakamega, Kenya

Coordinates: 0°13′N 34°48′E

Shinyalu Township is a small town located in the Kakamega County, Kenya. It is located about 415 km. Agriculture is the major economic activity with tea and maize being the major produce. A number of Tea collection centers occur within the Township with the bulk of the delivery being to Mudete Tea Factory. The Township has a sizable number of shops and a trading center. Among the traded items include farm produce like maize, beans and fresh produce. It also has a marketplace for trading in domestic animals notably cattle, sheep and goats.

== Kakamega Forest ==
The Kakamega Forest is a major tourist attraction within the Township. With its huge attraction of wild birds and rare plant species, many tourists both domestic and foreign frequent it, promoting the economy of the Township. Accommodations are available at the Kakamega Golf Hotel and Rondo Retreat Center<url=https://www.rondoretreat.com/.

== Prospects ==
With Shinyalu Township being the administrative headquarters of the Kakamega East District, the prospects of business growth are great. The anticipated infrastructure development is set to pave way for improved business opportunities and with the infrastructure in place, even greater business opportunities will arise.

== See also ==
Shinyalu Constituency
