= Nyasaye =

Nyasaye (also Nyasae or Nasaye) is the Luo and Gusii word for God. The same or similar words are also used by speakers of Luhya languages, referring to the same entity. For the Luo people, Nyasaye means the creator of the beginning. The Luo also called Nyasaye with different names such as Obongo NyaKalaga, Obong'o means one of a kind, while NyaKalaga means the all powerful everlasting one. Luos are strictly monotheistic. In other contexts, Nyakalaga means the crawling one, a reference among many in ancient Luo to serpents.

Some researchers have argued that the word Nyasaye doesn't mean exactly the same in Luo as the word God does in English. They argue that, even if the senses overlap, they don't carry the same connotations. The fact that English language is used to study religion in this case also contribute to misunderstandings of the way the Luo understand Nyasaye. However, some of the aforementioned expressions in Luo are used in prayers to speak about God in Luo translations of the Bible, since there are no other equivalents for God in the Luo language.

For the Luhya people, the high god is called Wele or Were, and he is male-gendered, while other spirits and gods can be of both genders or not gendered. The Christian God is called Nyasaye and is also male.

== Altered states of consciousness and Nyasaye ==
Theologist Jim Harries affirms that the way that African people get in touch with Nyasaye is through altered states of consciousness, which are seen as completely natural. These altered states can cause people in Kenya to dance violently or to see visions. They also believe that worldly wealth and understanding of the world can also be achieved by contacting Nyasaye through these states.

== Applications ==
Further applications of the word include:

- Omwami (the Lord)
- Omwami Nyasaye (the Lord God)
- Sefwe ouli mwikulu (Our Father who art in Heaven)
- Nyasaye w' tsimbabasi (God of Mercy)
- Nyasaye wobukosia (God of Grace)
- Nyasaye Papa (Father God)
- Nyasaye wokhunyala kosi (Almighty God)
- Nyasaye wa toto (the true God).
- Omwami Yesu (Lord Jesus)
- Nyasaye papa (God the Father)
- Nyasaye Omwana (God the Son)
- Nyasaye Roho Omutakatifu (God the Holy Spirit) - God the Father, the Son and the Holy Spirit
