= Nyole language (Uganda) =

Bantu language spoken in Uganda

Nyole
- Lunyole
- Native to: Uganda
- Region: Butaleja District
- Ethnicity: Banyole
- Native speakers: 340,000 (2002 census)
- Language family: Niger–Congo?: Atlantic–Congo; Volta-Congo; Benue–Congo; Bantoid; Southern Bantoid; Bantu; Northeast Bantu; Great Lakes Bantu; Masaba–Luhya (J.30); Nyole

Language codes
- ISO 639-3: nuj
- Glottolog: nyol1238
- Guthrie code: JE.35

Nyole (also LoNyole, Lunyole, Nyuli) is a Bantu language spoken by the Banyole in Butaleja District, Uganda. There is 61% lexical similarity with a related but different Nyole language in Kenya.

== Phonology ==
=== Consonants ===
		Labial	Alveolar	Palatal	Velar
Nasal		m	n	ɲ	ŋ
Plosive	voiceless	p	t	tʃ	k
Plosive	voiced	b	d	dʒ	g
Plosive	voiced prenasalized	ᵐb	ⁿd	ᶮdʒ	ᵑg
Fricative	voiceless	ɸ	s		x
Fricative	voiced	β			
Approximant		w	l~ɾ	j	(w)

Nyole has series of voiceless, voiced, and prenasalized stops. /w/ is labio-velar.

=== Vowels ===
	Front	Back
High	i	u
Mid	e	o
Low	a	

=== Historical changes ===
Nyole has an interesting development from Proto-Bantu *p → Nyole /ŋ/. Schadeberg (1989) connects this sound change to rhinoglottophilia, where the sound change developed first as *[p] → [ɸ] → [h]. Then, given the acoustic similarity of [h] and breathy voice to nasalization, the sound change progressed as [h] → [h̃] → [ŋ]. The velar place of articulation development is due to velar nasals being the least perceptible of the nasals and its marginal status in (pre-)Nyole and other Bantu languages. In closely related neighboring languages, *p developed variously into /h/ or /w/ or was deleted.

This historical development results in so-called "crazy" alternations, like /n/ + /ŋ/ resulting in /p/ as in the following:

n-ŋuliira ("hear" stem form) : puliira "I hear"
n-ŋumula ("rest" stem form) : pumula "I rest"

In the above two words, when the first person singular subject prefix /n-/ is added to the stem starting with /ŋ/, the initial consonant surfaces as /p/. In other forms (like /oxu-ŋuliira/ "to hear" and /oxu-ŋumula/ "to rest"), the original stem-initial /ŋ/ can be seen.

== Writing System ==
Alphabet nyole
a	aa	b	bb	c	d	e	ee	f	g	h	i	ii	j	k	l	m	n	ny	ŋ	o	oo	p	r	s	t	u	uu	v	w	y	z

== See also ==
- Luhya language
