= Nyole language (Kenya) =

Bantu language

Nyole
- Olunyole
- Native to: Kenya
- Region: Vihiga County
- Native speakers: 310,000 (2009 census)
- Language family: Niger–Congo?: Atlantic–Congo; Benue–Congo; Bantoid; Bantu; Northeast Bantu; Great Lakes Bantu; Masaba–Luhya (J.30); Nyole

Language codes
- ISO 639-3: nyd
- Glottolog: nyor1244
- Guthrie code: JE.33

Nyole (also Olunyole, Lunyole, Lunyore, Nyoole, Nyore, Olunyore) is a Bantu language spoken by the Luhya people in Vihiga County, Kenya. There is 61% lexical similarity with a related but different Nyole dialect in Uganda.

The Nyore people border the Luo, Maragoli and Kisa Luhya tribes.

== See also ==
- Luhya language
