= Nambale =

- Location within Kenya
- Coordinates: 0.45°N 34.25°E
- Country: Kenya
- County: Busia County
- Time zone: UTC+3 (EAT)

Nambale is a settlement in Kenya's Busia County. The settlement lies at an elevation of 3,900 feet (1,200 m). The estimated population is 111,632.. Th settlement has continued to expand as there have been talks of construction of a sugar cane factory, to be situated between River Sio and M'nambale stream.
