= Navakholo =

Town in Western Province, Kenya

- Town
- Location within Kenya
- Coordinates: 0.415°N 34.681°E
- Country: Kenya
- Province: Western
- County: Kakamega
- Time zone: UTC+3:00 (EAT)

Navakholo is a small town in Kakamega County in the Western Province of Kenya. It has a business center called Center (locally pronounced phonetically as "Senda"). The main language spoken is Nyala.

The town sits on the main earth road connecting Malava town to the East and Sianda Market to the West. It is the administrative centre for Navakholo cub-county within Kakamega County. It houses a District Commissioner, police station, a sub-district hospital and a market that operates every Saturday.

The town has grid electricity.

Navakholo has no real road network linking it to Kakamega town. The network becomes temporarily unavailable for use when it rains.
