= Zacchaeus Chesoni =

10th Chief Justice of Republic of Kenya

Justice Zacchaeus Chesoni E.G.H.

10th Chief Justice of Kenya
- Appointed by: Daniel Arap Moi
- Preceded by: Abdul Majid Cockar
- Succeeded by: Bernard Chunga

Personal details
- Born: Zacchaeus Chesoni; 1 January 1936 Western Kenya
- Died: 5 September 1999 (aged 63) Nairobi Hospital, Nairobi
- Resting place: Webuye, Western Kenya
- Occupation: Chief Justice of Kenya
- Profession: Judge

Zacchaeus Chesoni (born c. 1936 - 5 September 1999) was Chief Justice of Kenya and chairman of the Electoral Commission . Chesoni hails from the Kabras sub tribe Bamachina clan close to Chimoi area around Webuye.
