= Idakho =

The Idakho (Abitakho, Idakho, Abidakho) are a Luhya sub-group that reside primarily in the fertile Kakamega District, Western Kenya. Idakho is administratively known as Ikolomani, Ikolomani being the only Constituency in the region.

As is the case with the wider Western Province, Idakho, Kakamega is densely populated with its 2007 population estimated at having surpassed 150,000.

The Idakho people a subgroup of the Luhya ethnic group were estimated in the 2019 Census of Kenya to number 59,661 people.

It is widely believed that the Bidakho are descendants of Mwitakho.

Scarcity of land and the Bidakho's changing lifestyles have made the people diversify with many today engaging in dairy farming and on a smaller scale, tea farming. Maize however is the most widely grown crop, supplying their staple food, bushuma. It is harvested bi-annually.They are known for Isukuti (Mwinuyu) Dance, drum making, and bullfighting.

The traditional life however only serves as a supplement to their 'modern' family life.

Enjoying good levels of literacy (72%), Bidakho today are actively engaged in business, the civil service and private enterprise in all major East African towns.

== History ==
Mwitakho and his brother, Mwisukha are widely believed to have founded the two subtribes - Idakho and Isukha...

== Geography ==
They are located between two major tarmac roads: One leading to Kakamega from Kisumu, and the other leading to Mumias from Kakamega.

== The Arts and Culture ==
=== Bull-fighting ===
Bull Fighting is one of Kakamega's main tourist attraction sites. Pot making brings income to women while Gold digging is known to take place in the River Yala and around Sigalagala(f.pakata, kicd 2016)

=== Dance ===
- Isikuti dance
- Lipala

=== Language ===
Lwidakho dialect.

=== Religion ===
Many people go to Friends Church (Quakers) as it is popular in the Western Region.

== The Idakho Clans ==
=== Abashimuli ===
Abashimuli clan are mainly found in Iguhu location of Ikolomani Constituency. Abashimuli word comes from the word Shimuli meaning bud flowers. They're found in Iyala, Masiyenze, makhokho villages. Common names among Abashimuli include Lijembe, Shivachi, Ambani, Makhaya, Wendo etc.

=== Abashikulu ===
Bashikulu are idakho people that now live at Ishikulu which includes Ishichiko and Ilusiola. Others are at Imakata and Imadivini. These include the Ngairas', Amulyotos of the Basirima.

=== Abamasaba ===
They are located in mutaho and shimanyiro area. River Isiukhu traverses their region. Major families include Ndula, Mukhono and many others. They are considered to be among the most educated as most of them are lecturers, doctors, engineers and other white collar professions.

=== Abamusali ===
They are known for bullfighting

== Abamabuusi ==
- Lennox Ludenyo Amalemba

== Current Leaders ==
- Bernard Shinali, MP Ikolomani
