= Moses Mudavadi =

Kenyan politician

Moses Substone Budamba Mudavadi (1923–1989) was an influential politician from Sabatia, Kenya, in the early post-independence years under former president Daniel Moi.

He was the first patron of the Maragoli Cultural Festival until his death in 1989.

His son, Musalia Mudavadi succeeded him as the Sabatia Constituency member of parliament. He was the husband to Hannah Mudavadi
