= Tsotso =

Tribe of the Luhya nation in Kenya

The Tsotso or Abatsotso are a tribe of the Luhya nation in Kenya. They occupy three locations in Lurambi division of Kakamega District. The three locations are Bukura, north Butsotso and south Butsotso.

== See also ==
- Luhya people
- Luhya languages
