= Vihiga District =

Former district in Kenya

Coordinates: 0°4′N 34°40′E

Vihiga District was an administrative district in the Western Province of Kenya. Its capital town was Mbale. The district had a population of 498,883 (1999 census) and an area of 563 km^{2}. Vihiga District was split from Kakamega District in 1990. By the 2009, Vihiga itself had been split into three smaller districts of Vihiga, Emuhaya, and Hamisi. All with a combined population of 554,622; the smaller Vihiga District with a population of 221,294.

In 2010, after the promulgation of the new constitution of Kenya, counties were to be created based on the districts of Kenya as at 1992. This effectively led to the creation of Vihiga County.

== Local authorities ==
Authority	Type	Population*	Urban pop.*
Vihiga	Municipality	98,189	19,067
Luanda	Town	68,157	8,757
Vihiga county	County	332,537	0
* 1999 census. Source:

== Administrative divisions ==
Division	Population*	Urban pop.*	Headquarters
Emuhaya	69,250	0	
Luanda	92,462	8.016	Luanda
Sabatia	117,863	10.135	
Tiriki East	59,943	0	
Tiriki West	76,370	0	
Vihiga	82,995	6.881	Vihiga
* 1999 census. Sources: , ,

== Constituencies ==
The district has four constituencies:

- Emuhaya Constituency
- Hamisi Constituency
- Sabatia Constituency
- Vihiga Constituency
