= Logooli language =

Bantu language spoken in Kenya

Logooli
- Lulogooli
- Native to: Kenya
- Ethnicity: Maragoli
- Native speakers: 620,000 (2009 census)
- Language family: Niger–Congo?: Atlantic–Congo; Volta-Congo; Benue–Congo; Bantoid; Southern Bantoid; Bantu; Northeast Bantu; Great Lakes Bantu; Greater Luyia; Logooli

Language codes
- ISO 639-3: rag
- Glottolog: logo1258
- Guthrie code: JE.41

Logooli (alternate names: Lugooli, Llugule, Llogole, Luragoli, Uluragooli, Maragooli, Maragoli, or Ragoli; native name: Lulogooli) is a Bantu language spoken in Kenya.

== See also ==
- Great Lakes Bantu languages
