= Marachi =

Tribe of the Luhya people of Kenya

The Marachi are one of sixteen tribes of the Luhya people of Kenya, making up approximately one percent of the Luyha. They are one of the three Luhya groups occupying Busia County, along with the Bakhayo and the Samia.

== See also ==
- Luhya people
- Luhya languages
