= Kakamega District =

Former district of Kenya

Coordinates: 0.283333°N 34.75°E

Kakamega District was a district in the Western Province of Kenya. Its capital town was Kakamega. It had a population of 603,422 people and an area of 1,395 km². Kakamega was created in 1963 by the colonial government from the North Nyanza District (formerly North Kavirondo District) that existed from the 1920s. In 1990, Kakamega District lost its southern portion to create Vihiga District.

Local authorities (councils)
Authority	Type	Population*	Urban pop.*
Kakamega	Municipality	73,607	57,128
Malava	Town	46,614	1,704
Kakamega County	County	483,201	0
Total	-	603,422	58,832
* 1999 census. Source:

Administrative divisions
Division	Population*	Urban pop.*	Headquarters
Ikolomani	92,104	0	Ikolomani
Ileho	32,545	0	Kambili
Kabras	149,510	1,530	Malaba
Kakamega municipality	74,115	51,770	Kakamega
Lurambi	85,863	0	Shisilu
Navakholo	65,337	0	Navakholo
Shinyalu	103,948	0	Shinyalu
Total	603,422	53,300	-
* 1999 census. Sources: , ,

The district had four constituencies:

- Malava Constituency
- Lurambi Constituency
- Shinyalu Constituency
- Ikolomani Constituency
