= Tiriki =

Clan in Western Kenya

The Tiriki is a tribe consisting of 16 clans and dialects of the Abaluyia people of Western Kenya. The word Tiriki is also used to refer to their geographical location of Hamisi subcounty, Vihiga County, in the Western region of Kenya. Hamisi Constituency now Hamisi Subcounty is one of the longest in Kenya stretching from Kiboswa (Ny'angori) to Shiru, which borders Kapsabet and Musunji which borders Kakamega Forest. Some members of tiriki clan moved to nandi county and occupied aldai and other parts of nandi county.

== Administration ==
Tiriki is located in the Republic of Kenya in Vihiga County, one of the five counties that formed the former Western Province. The other counties in the former Western Province are Kakamega (which Vihiga was previously a part of), Bungoma, and Busia. Trans-Nzoia County is located in the former Rift Valley but has a majority Abaluyia population. Nandi County in the former Rift Valley province also has a sizable but minority Abaluyia population.

The name Hamisi refers to Hamisi Division or sub-county of Vihiga County which is overseen by a District Officer. The name Hamisi also refers to Hamisi constituency which is represented in the Kenya National Assembly by a Member of Parliament. The name Hamisi also refers to the Administrative Capital of Hamisi Constituency where majority of government offices in the Division are located. The name Hamisi itself was derived from a trader who run a shop in the area from the early days of colonialism. The typical way the Tiriki refer to Hamisi is "Wahamisi" which means the place of Hamisi.

Tiriki is just under 40 kilometers long, running southwest to north east. It is roughly shaped like a dumbbell. About 5 km wide in the south-west, less than 2 km wide in the centre, and 8 km wide in the north-east.

The total land areas is about 110 square kilometers, of which about 30 square kilometers are part of Kaimosi Forest.

== Coördinates ==
Tiriki lies at a Latitude of 0.09 degrees North and a Longitude of 34.85 degrees East. The average altitude is 1740m or 5709 ft above sea level.

== Weather ==
Daily temperatures average a low of 12 °C (53.6 °F) and a high of 24 °C (75.2 °F) meaning the weather is very pleasant and mild. Rainfall ranges from a low of about 4 cm in February to a high of about 12 cm in October. October and April have over 20 days of rainfall. January and February average about 10 days of rainfall.

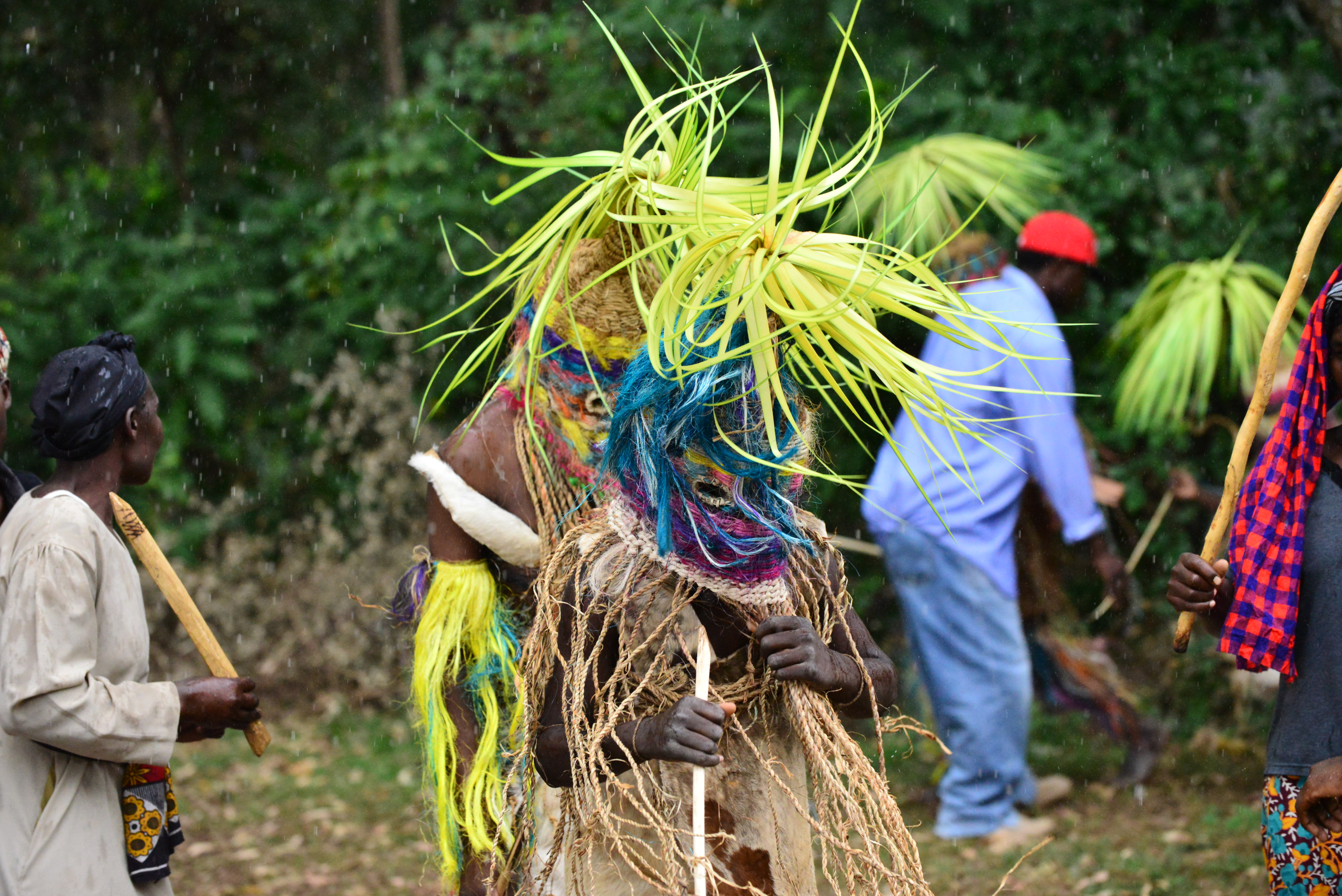
Tiriki mask

== Clans ==
Tiriki clans include Vikhava, Valukhova, Vakhadiri, Vahaliero, Vajisinde, Vaumbo, Vashitsungu, Vamavi, Vamiluha, Valukhombe, Vadura, Vamayudu, Vamuli, Vasamia, Varimbuli, Vavuga, Vasaniaga, Vanyonji, Vamoiya, Vamasese, Vaguga, Turug'a(vamuruga mmluga) and Vasuba. ('Walking with Joel' - The Mwanzi Dynasty)) We also have the Bamahalia clan. and Vashivo clan as well

Tirikis live in proximity with the Maragoli, Nandi, Luo, Banyole and the Idakho, their fellow Luhya tribes and hence the similarities with three clans of the Maragoli i.e. Vakizungu, Vamavi and Vasaniaga. Among all of the Luyha tribes, the Tiriki are particularly famous for their circumcision ceremonies with elaborate masks and body paint akin to Luhyas of Kabras in Malava (or Terik of the Nandi tribe) held in forests around in Western and parts of Trans-Nzoia province.

The Tiriki speak Ludiriji (more widely referred to Lutirichi or Tiriki, according to Ethnologue) and occupy the area North of Hamisi District in localities like Wamisi (Hamisi), Shamakhokho, Lwandon, Erusui, Esenende (home of Senende Boys High School), Igavinjari, Igavsotichi, Ichitinda, Muhudu, Musunji, Kaptisi, Ibumbo, Ishiru, Tindinyo, Gamalenga, Shivembe and the border town of Seremi which borders Aldai (Nandi); Rift Valley Province.

== Kaimosi Mission ==
Kaimosi Mission, which is surrounded by Tiriki land, was the first Christian mission to be established in Western Kenya province in 1902. It became the principal centre of Friends work in East Africa.

Today the Kaimosi Mission hosts the NCCK Jumuia Friends Hospital which was formerly Kaimosi Hospital. It also hosts Friends Kaimosi university. It hosts the Friends Theological College, Kaimosi Teachers training College, Kaimosi Girls High School, and Kaimosi Friends Primary School, Kaimosi boys High School, Kaimosi special School, Kaimosi Demonstration High School, Kaimosi Friends vacational training School, and Friends College Kaimosi.

== Notable persons ==
- Patricia Amira, Media personality and communication specialist
- Patrick Hoyd Isadia
- Rogers Sultani Bwosi
- George Munyasa Khaniri

== See also ==
- Idaxo-Isuxa-Tiriki language
- Luhya people
- Luhya languages
