= Doho Rice Scheme =

Irrigation rice scheme in Uganda

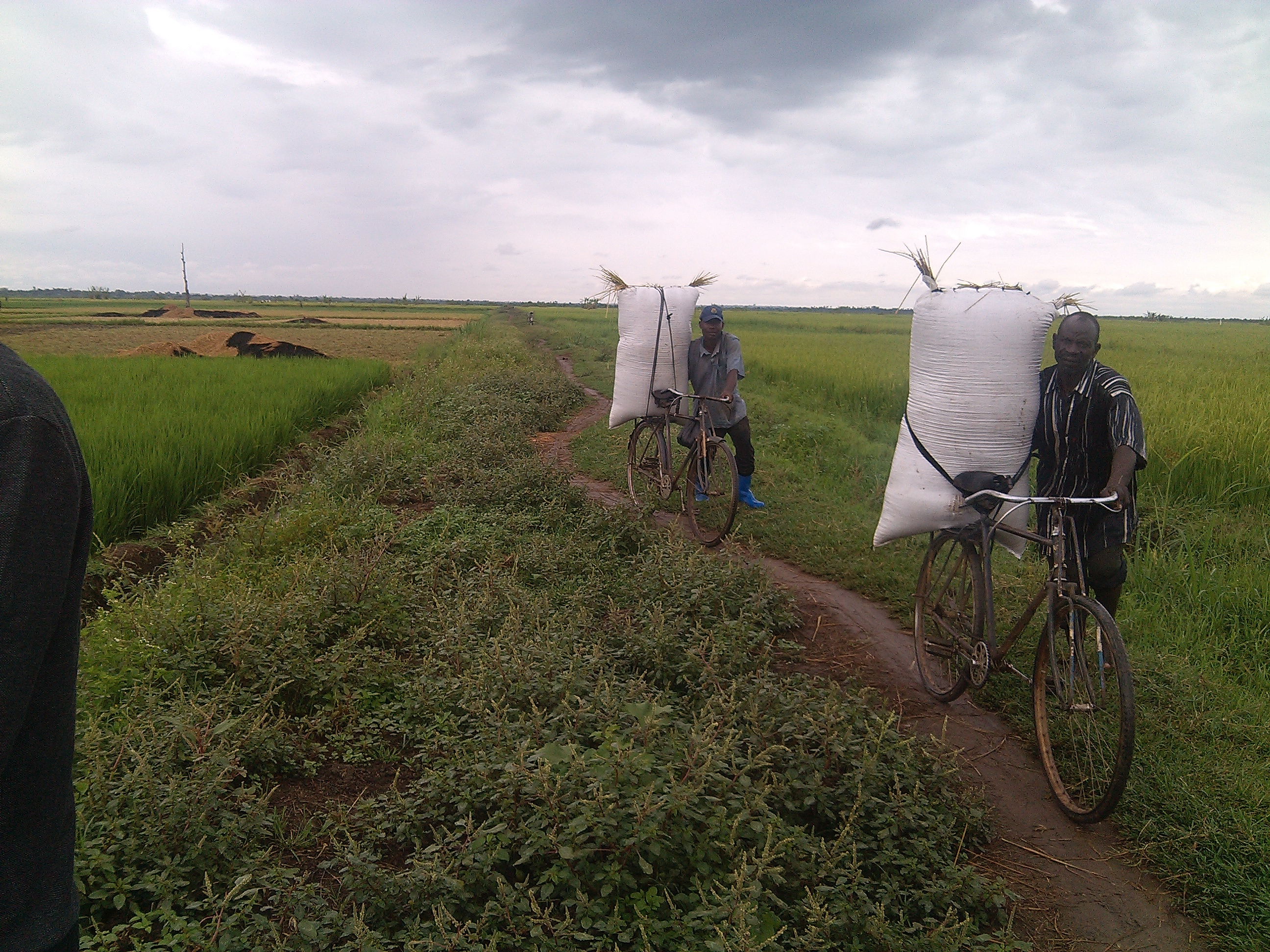
- Doho Rice Scheme farmers transporting harvested rice
- Town/City: Butaleja District, Eastern Uganda
- Coordinates: 0°57′10.61″N 34°1′48.77″E
- Established: 1976; 50 years ago
- Owner: Government of Uganda
- Area: 2,500 ha (6,200 acres)
- Produces: Rice
- Status: Active

Doho Rice Scheme is an irrigation rice scheme found in Butaleja District, Eastern Uganda. Rice production in Doho started in 1942 to feed World War II soldiers. After the war, production declined until 1972. However, after several constraints to the scheme including flooding of River Manafwa and scarcity of irrigation water during the dry season, the farmers appealed for Government of Uganda intervention.

In 1976, the scheme was officially established by the government with funding from the Chinese government which was completed in 1984. Doho rice scheme is a 2,500 hectares (6,200 acres) irrigation scheme, sustaining not less than 10,000 farmers both out-growers and part of the scheme's growers. Most of the scheme was formerly a seasonal wetland on the River Manafwa flood-plain. The scheme is now an area of intensive irrigated rice cultivation with adjacent areas of natural wetland, mainly in the south. The Doho Irrigation Scheme Farmers Cooperative Society (DIFACOS) is the umbrella body set up to manage the scheme.

== Location ==
Doho Rice Irrigation Scheme spans in both Mazimasa and Kachonga Sub-Counties of East Bunyole County in Butaleja District of Uganda. It is 49 km (30 mi) from Tororo town, 25 km (16 mi) from Mbale town and 260 km (160 mi) from Kampala city and 70 km (43 mi) from Malaba, Uganda-Kenya border. Doho Rice Scheme is located in the Lake Kyoga basin and covers an area of 494.2 square kilometres (190.8 square miles).

== See also ==
- Butaleja District
- Government of Uganda
