= African divination =

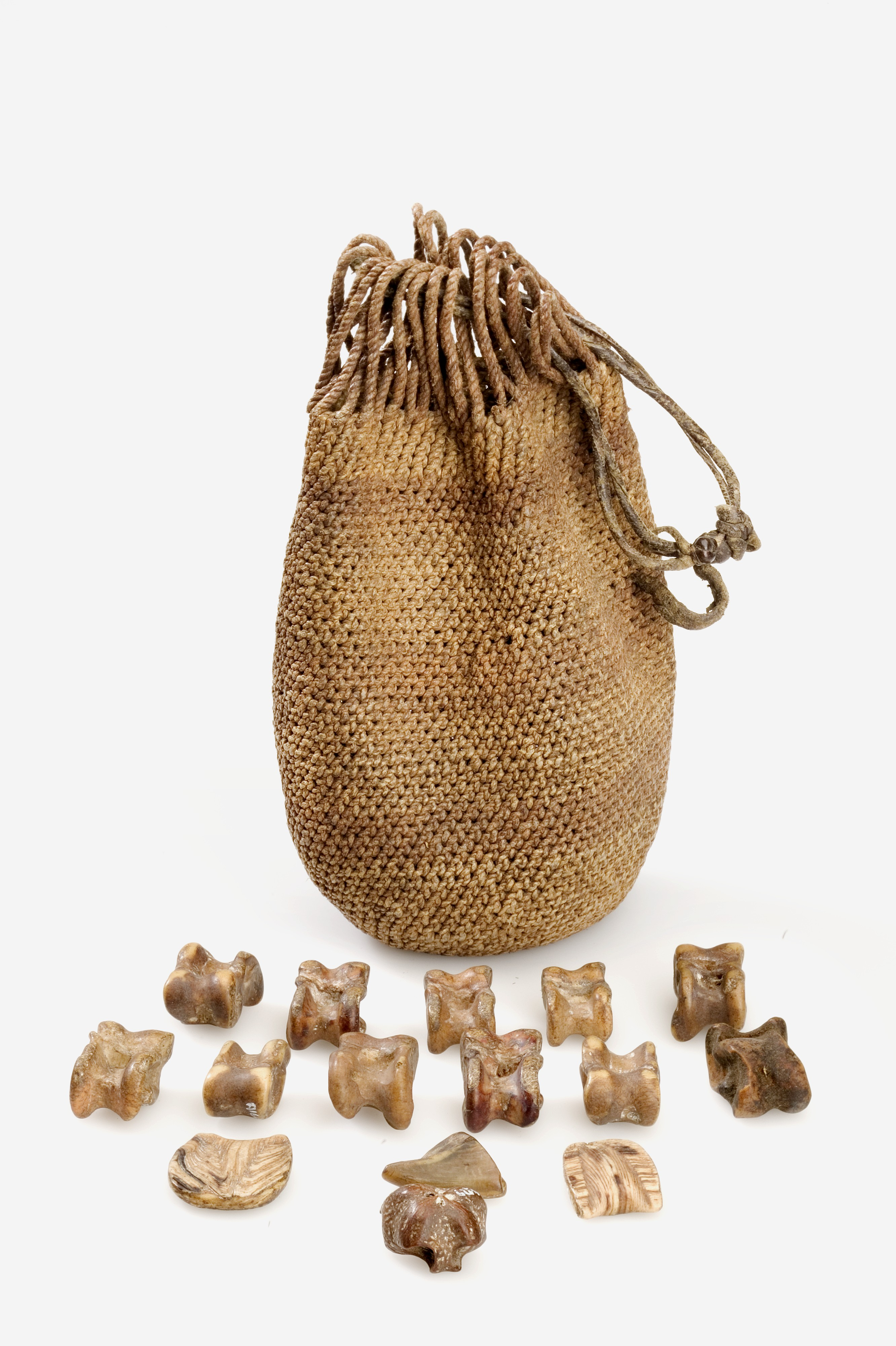
Bag with objects for divination. Africa, 1880–1920. (Wellcome Trust: L0057645)

Divination is an attempt to form, and possess, an understanding of reality in the present and additionally, to predict events and reality of a future time. Divination has been practiced in African societies for millennia. Divination might be thought of as a social phenomenon, and is central to the lives of many in Africa.

== Central Africa ==
=== Angola ===
Amongst the Ambundu people, a diviner is known as a kimbanda, while they are known as an nganga amongst the Kongo people. In northeast Angola and neighboring regions of Zambia and the Democratic Republic of the Congo, some diviners practice basket divination.

=== Burundi ===
A number of individuals who are divinators within Burundi, use a lance which is composed of copper, to divine.

=== Cameroon ===
The Kapsiki and Higi people of Cameroon use crabs for divination. The Mambila use both crabs and spiders (see Mambila spider divination and Zeitlyn 2020), and in the forest zone spiders are widely used in the form called nggam.

=== Central African Republic ===
One method utilised by the Zandé people, is the poison-chicken method, in this, a chicken is administered poison, and the effects with regards to consequent mortality or survival of the creature determines the divination. This method is named Benge.

When a divinater has a sickened person to treat, the tribal group Nzakara makes a divination from asking question, which have either an affirmation or negation (i.e. either a yes or no answer), as a response (R. Devisch citing Retel-Laurentin;1974).

=== The Democratic Republic of Congo ===
The diviners of the Pende use instruments for divination.

The Yaka people contain individuals who divine. Yaka divination, which is mediumistic, originated in the ngoombu cult.

A. Almquist studied the Pagibeti, R. Devisch studied the Yaka, while the country was known as Zaire (pre-August 1992).

== East Africa ==
=== Djibouti ===
==== Afar ====
Divination plays a part in the lives of the nomadic Afar people, who range over Ethiopia, and Eritrea, but whose members are greatest within Djibouti (c. 2013).

=== Eritrea ===
Eritrean witch-doctors also participate in divination.

=== Ethiopia ===
Among the Bertha, divination practices including the throwing of bones of wild animals (osteomancy) and also consultation of special books. Among the Me'en, there are specialists who read the entrails of a slaughtered animal, haruspication.

Among over 10 groups in Ethiopia, a diviner throws a pair of sandals and predicts the future based on how they fall.

Amhara society holds a strong history of divination. Within the tribe, there are 4 main belief systems. The first system is primarily focused on the tenets of Christianity and all of its entities. The second system is composed of a belief of possessive spirits known as "zar". The third system centers around a special, cursed group of people known as the budu, who divine through use of their eyes and facial expressions. Lastly, the fourth system focuses on the belief of malicious spirits known as "satan" or "ciraq" that are unavoidable and enjoy wreaking havoc on innocents.

An Ethiopian ethnic group associated with the Amhara known as buda are thought to possess the "evil eye": a divination symbol capable of casting spells and misfortune with just a glance or facial expression. "Evil eye spells" are believed to be the cause of multiple maladies such as "wasting sickness, domestic accidents, infertility, plain bad luck, sick livestock, and blighted crops." The use of the evil eye is widely believed to be witchcraft steeped in envy or covetousness of another's possessions, status, or gain. As a result, those believed to be "cursed" with the evil eye are cast down to the lowest social level within Ethiopian community settings.

Spirit possession is another strong tenet of Amharan divination techniques. Special spirits known as zar are called by Amharan shamans in an effort to "heal" effected tribe members from a number of afflictions. The most common patients of zar healing are said to be "women who feel neglected in a man's world in which they serve as hewers of wood and haulers of water..." It is a form of spiritism known and practiced in Nubia, Egypt, Sudan, between Jewish Ethiopians, ancient Persia and Iran. The bodiless and invisible spirits are used to be involved when believers "face difficult circumstances such as marital conflicts, gender and social inequalities or in response to social and cultural changes."

Amharan diviners also utilize a method which is known as awdunigist as a means of "astrological numerology". Divination is made by counting stars in the night-sky. (R. Devisch citing Young; 1977).

=== Kenya ===
Divination specialism exists in Kenya.

The Nandi diviners, known as "Chepsageinik" or "Kibarbarinik" or "Keeriik". Those who can see beyond - they are both diviners and locators. They can locate where the lost items, money or animals are. They use some small pieces of round stones called Barbarek which they put in a certain calabash, shake them and throw them out. After which they study them as per the direction each one took and give the answers either to the cause of illness or where about of the animals. Some may use the animals intestines to predict epidemic in the society or the blessings coming to the community. Mbiti states that 'when things go wrong people try to find the causes, and after these causes are believed to be human agents using magic, sorcery or witchcraft' (2010), p. 170. They always do not stop at only what or who caused things to go wrong. They engage to put it right what has gone wrong the soonest possible. When they want to use an animal, they do not kill by cutting the neck but by suffocating the animal. Then the specialists took to their business of skinning the animal with a lot of care to avoid the shedding of blood. Diviners remove the intestines and study them carefully the pattern of the clotted blood and give their results. Divination is an incredibly rich area for anthropological research—in fact, I would argue that there is no richer ethnography of a culture than the study of its divination system. In a very real sense, as the Yoruba of Nigeria explicitly state about their system of Ifa, a divination system constitutes a people's "book of knowledge" wherein their history and cultural guidelines are maintained.

The Giriama and Swahili of Kenya contain individuals who practice divination (D. Parkin 1991). Swahili use the mostly astrological and numerological text, Falak, to divinate, based on an earlier text 'ilm al-Falak, which was used by Arabic and Omani to teach Africans astronomy and astrology. Giriama society is split into three main divination categories. First is the kaya, the elders of the society, in which many ritualistic and cultural traditions are held. Secondly, "ritual practitioners", or shaman, who provide spiritual support to Giriama entrepreneurs. Lastly, there are the high social class diviners who combine their skilled use of divination with politics to achieve high political capital and influence. Many Giriama report being afflicted by "spirit possession" of Islamic ghosts who aim to convert Giriama to Islam. Such accounts report "symptoms of possession involv[ing] somatic reactions that force Giriama into Muslim food avoidance patterns".

In Malindi, spirit-medium diviners are known as aganga a mburuga. Aganga a kuvoyera are both diviners and healers, who are additionally experts in locating witchcraft. This last capacity is thought important because of business situations giving rise to accusations of witchcraft.

The diviner (c.1904–1986) in the Luo is known as ajuoga. Ajuoga has the meaning, juok only or just juok (J. Harries 2012). The ajuoga are also known as night-runners.

One investigation found within the Kaya area (of the Mijikenda peoples) most diviners were male, while within the Magarini area they were female. In Malindi circa 2009, most diviners were female.

Some groups in Kenya also practice sandal divination, where a diviner tosses a pair of sandals in the air and interprets their position on the ground. This is practiced among the Borana, Turkana, Dasenach, Meru, Pokot, and Samburu.

=== Nilo-Saharan speaking people of the Sudan ===
In cases and situations where ill and hurt or harm has been done by a sorcerer or suspected sorcerer, divination is used to both confirm or deny the presence of sorcery and if a sorcerer is found to be responsible, to then identify the sorcerer.

Protection from sorcery is afforded by a diviner by recourse to amulets, for which the diviner might take payment for, or alternatively, the diviner might assist with the direct punishment of a sorcerer by occult means, for the explicit reason of effecting a cure for the affliction.

J. W. Burton made a study of the practice of divination of these peoples, particularly the Atuot.

A belief held by the Atuot is of behaviour that is deemed improper causing disharmony in a world that is harmonious, and the punishment of sickness, ignorance and death is made by God, which is only alleviated by divination.

The faqih of Muslim societies, who is the theologian and jurist thought the most learned, also fulfills a role as a diviner.

Murle people traditionally practiced sandal divination, a diviner tossed sandals into the air and interpreted the way they lay on the ground.

=== Uganda ===
The Nyole people of Uganda include individuals who practice divination (S. Reynolds 1991). Nyole diviners, known as lamuli, commonly practice invocation as a form of divination. When a person is visibly afflicted (usually determined by change of character, wellness, vocal exclamations, etc.), lamuli will ask "ohwebusa" in an attempt to ask a potentially malignant spirit who they are. Lamuli are used by Nyole people solely to determine the causes of misfortune, which is believed to be the cause of malignant or upset spirits. It is believed by the Nyole people that the possession of a person is largely due to the spirits of his kin, who may feel as though the afflicted person has not done enough to honor them or their legacy. There are three main types of unhappy kin spirits. The first are known as ohulama or ohung'waba, and are older family members such as grandparents. The second type are ancestor spirits known as emigu j'abafu, and the third type are known as ekuni, or "clan spirits".

The lamuli also use books for divination. The books used by the lamuli might be The Holy Qur'an, the Sa'atili Habari and the Abu Mashari Faraki. Divination by the use of books is thought to have begun by way of the first influence of Ali bin Nasoor, a trader from Oman who settled in Busolwe, and also by the influence of other Swahili or Arabic traders.

Findings of an investigation made by S. R. Whyte found that the majority of people (in the sample) went for divination consultations for reasons of their own bad or failed health (please see reference page 16).

== North Africa ==
=== Algeria ===
Women of certain urban settlements of Algeria engage in divinatory practice involving the būqālah, which is both, a ceramic vessel, and a form of poetry.

=== Egyptian ===
According to Sir E. A. Wallis Budge (c. 1930), and at least according to archaeological evidence, practice of divination among the people of Egypt did not begin until the Ptolemaic period, and according to the source, it is almost certain (at the time of writing), native populations of Egypt began practice of these things by way of Grecian individuals who themselves had learnt about divination from Babylonia. Necromancy exists in Demotic texts of Ancient Egypt (R. K. Ritner). Necromantic consultation of dead royalty was common during the beginning of the Twentieth Dynasty, which began year ca.1195 BC.

== Southern Africa ==
=== Botswana ===
Tswapong know and see seriti as significant to their understanding. They might use lots to divinate, which are known collectively, being of a variety of forms, ditaolo. Of the family of objects which a Tswapong might use, one of these members are bones:

Marapo a tse disuleng alaola ditsela

—

=== Madagascar ===
P. Vérin and N. Rajaonarimanana made a study of the Antemoro system of divination within the Madagascan peoples. Divining is a common profession

Sikidy is a system of mathematical divination used by the ombiasa (diviner) within the Sakalava peoples. Sikidy uses acacia seeds. Ascher published a 1997 study of sikidy. The deity Zanahary is the guiding deity for the divination, according to Sakalava belief. The ombiasa begins by making four piles of acacia seeds, then finds the number of seeds in one of the piles. If the number of seeds in this pile is an odd number of seeds then one seed is set aside, if even then two are set aside. This process is continued with each pile until another (fifth) pile is created by the seeds put aside, and from this situation more measuring of seeds is made, the degree of counting depending on a decision by way of sacred knowledge which the ombiasa has, by up to the creation of twelve piles. By way of the influence of Zanahary, each pile is assigned a status as either slave or prince and assigned as being one of the cardinal points, and by this means the ombiasa is led to the divinatory conclusion.

=== Mozambique ===
Diviners of Mozambique use divining apparatus known as tinholo, which are collections of various divination items. Examples of items that can be used in a tinholo set include "male and female items, bones or other parts of wild and domestic animals..." Each item in a tinholo set has a counterpart, which represents a need for balance.

The diviner among the Ndau is called the Nyamso lo. The Nyamso lo possesses divinatory powers because of the divinator being "possessed" and, while possessed, controlled by a sentient force known as the Zinthi ki. The Zinthi ki is friendly, and comes to the diviner from a place which is further away, the Zinthi ki is never a living human friend or relative While possessed, the Nyamso lo is unconscious of the happenings which occur. In possession by Zin thi ki, the Nyamso lo might shudder, tremble and rock a little, with eyes either tightly shut, or open with a glassiness to them, and speaks with a voice which is unnatural in its hoarseness and being guttural.

=== South Africa ===
The Xhosa peoples contain individuals who practice divination.

The diviner of the Amazulu (the Zulu people) of South East Africa is known as Izinyanga Zokabula, or an Inyanga. Diviners are said to have soft heads. In the period of initiation, the man, to begin with, abstains from certain foods, and eats only a small amount of food of the foods he does eat. He complains about bodily pain. He dreams many things (he has become a house of dreams). He finally becomes ill and goes to a diviner to seek help, but the man stays unwell for perhaps two years. At this time he is already possessed by the Itongo. His hair falls out. His skin is now dry. About this time he becomes aware of his divinatory powers which are heard and seen by his sneezing and yawning repeatedly, and is also now liking snuff very much, taking this often. He suffers convulsions in illness and has water poured over him, at which time the convulsions stop for a while. He cries and weeps. During the night sometimes others go to sing with him, after he has awoken them with his own singing, after having composed a song. His body is now emaciated. During the initiation the sleep pattern of the initiate changes to a number of brief periods and awaking to be active singing songs and leaping inside and outside (like a frog). The village make an effort to make the initiates Itongo white. At this time, a well-respected and known Inyanga makes ubulawo (an emetic) for the initiate, the initiate and the Inyanga spend two days together, then the initiate is himself an Inyanga. The initiating Inyanga first eats black impepo, to take away dimness from the inner sight, then white impepo. White impepo is used to maintain trueness of inner sight after the black impepo. Both are emetics. The Inyanga sleeps with black impepo (under the head) to make the dreams clear and true.

Within an area close to Pretoria, a divinater is known as a sangoma.

=== Namibia ===
In Namibia, as in a number of places further east and north, some people practice sandal divination. Vedder reported that the Berg Dama/Bergdama of Namibia practiced sandal divination.

== West Africa ==
=== Benin ===
Within Benin, individuals known as Ebo participate in divination, by interpretation of the past, and prediction of the future, by way and use of Osun. Osun is a force of spiritualness, which the Ebo possesses by harnessing power from the use of plants.

=== Burkina Faso ===
P. Meyer studied divination within the Lobi. A belief held by the Lobi is of behaviour which is deemed improper causing disharmony in a world which is harmonious, and the punishment of sickness, ignorance and death is made by God which is only alleviated by divination. The Lobi diviner is connected to a god known as a Wathil, and the Wathil is the diviners personal god. The Lobi diviner usually does not fulfill any other role than divination, and might see between five and twenty clients per day. The diviner is expected to not refuse anyone who wants a divination, if the diviner refuses then the Wathil expresses disapproval. The status afforded to the Lobi diviner depends upon the quality of the service provided only, which is, the status held corresponds to the accuracy of the divination.

This ceremony requires a trained practitioner, who is called a diviner that assists in mediating the spiritual and physical world. Central to this ceremony are small sculpted figures known as baba which are arranged on the ground with utmost care before the ceremony. Divination among the Lobi people of southern Burkina Faso is a very spiritual practice with a major role in assisting individuals to deal with life's uncertainties. These carved images are more than mere works of art and are instead holy intermediaries that connect the human and spiritual worlds. In the divination session, the client seeking guidance sits with the diviner in an initiation ceremony. Both sit with hands clasped and pose their questions to unseen spirits.

The diviner's job is to interpret the replies received through the subtle movement of their hands together. These movements are reputed to be under the control of thila spirits, i.e., powerful supernatural forces thought to inhabit the bateba statues. When the spirits grant permission for a response, the hands can move in one direction or another to signify agreement. Conversely, another movement indicates a negative response or refusal of the question. The bateba figures themselves are meticulously built, typically in the form of human or animal forms that symbolize various spiritual attributes. This form of divination is employed for numerous purposes in Lobi society, including resolving disputes diagnosing illness, and requesting protection or blessings. Through divination, people gain important insight into their problems, are warned about impending dangers, and are comforted by the presence of spiritual guidance. The ancient practice is still an integral part of Lobi cultural identity, testifying to their continuing attachment to the spiritual world. This practice shows the Lobi people's conviction in a world where ancestral spirits and supernatural powers actively shape human fate.

Initiation marks a person's complete integration into society, and this is necessary to receive ancestor worship at one's death. The Lobi word for initiation rite—dyoro, jòrò—is held every seven years (usually from November to January) and different age groups will attend at different times. Its precise happenings are guarded with great secrecy: only those who have been initiated are allowed access to the details. To have undergone the dyoro means you are regarded as "Lobe", belonging to this collective whole context over individual origins or sex. The initiation rite performs both social and religious functions. It marks the passage from childhood to adulthood, supplying moral, cultural, and practical training so that people will behave correctly in society through all of their lives without starting trouble for everyone else. Novices come together in small groups of four or five for instruction in isolation from the community. This produces among them firm lifelong friendships and also acquaints them with the duties of adult life.

=== Cape Verde ===
In Cape Verde a diviner is called a médico divinhador.

=== Côte d'Ivoire and Ghana ===
The Baule people live within the Ivory Coast, they have diviners who divine by trance and by another means, the Baule make a contraption for the purposes of oracular divination, called a ghekre, which contains mice. The Baule diviners can be male or female. The diviners have paraphernalia, and this is hats, mallets, display weaponry and iron gongs, and the diviner also possesses a fine-art sculpture(s) of the human figure.

A mouse of the variety field mouse is put within a cylindrical vessel within which vessel the mouse has something to eat. As the mouse eats it displaces little batons attached to the side of a tortoise shell tray within the vessel. As the batons fall they create a unique pattern on the ground and the diviner looks at these to tell the divination. The type of mouse living within the Ivory Coast includes the Baer's wood mouse, Forest soft-furred mouse and Miller's striped mouse.

The Senufo peoples know their diviner as a Sando.

=== Nigeria ===
The Aro people had a number of shrines dedicated to the god Ibin Ukpabi that had uses including oracular practice, the foremost of these being located at the capital of the Aro territory in Arochukwu. The results of the practice of divination within these shrines was utilised by Aro divinaters to move slaves to oppose the control of British colonial powers. The Aro people utilised divination during battles against the British military to later defend the first shrine in Arochukwu from destruction. The shrine was ultimately destroyed in 1902. Members of the Aro were still participating in practices dedicated to Ibin Ukpabi in 2015.

The Yoruba have a system of divination known as Ifa. By Ifa a divinator, known to his people as a babalawo, invokes the Yoruba god Orunmila, who provides divinatory insight. The Yoruba Ifa Odu verses are a corpus used for the purposes of divination. The Yoruba diviner might use sixteen cowrie-shells instead of the Ifa oracle, or sixteen palm nuts. According to the Yoruba tribe, men and women are both allowed to practice the sixteen cowrie method, but only men are allowed to practice the Ifa method.

The Kapsiki and Higi people of north-eastern Nigeria use crabs for divination, called dlera. The crab is presented with a problem or asked a question, then placed in a pot of water, sand, and calabash shards for a period of time. The divination is performed by observing how the crab has moved about the pot during that time. Other types of divination are also called dlera, or "hearing the crab" as a generic term.

=== Gambia, Senegal and Mauritania ===
The Serer people of the Gambia, Senegal, and Mauritania refer to their diviners as Saltigue. These are the "hereditary Rain priests" and guardians of Serer religion and customs, a birthright they inherited from the ancient lamanes. Each year, a divination ceremony called the Xooy (also: Xoy or Khoy) takes place in Fatick. The Xooy ceremony has been added by UNESCO to its list of cultural heritage.

=== Sierra Leone ===
The Temne of Sierra Leone contain individuals who practiced divination at a time circa the year 1991.(R. Shaw 1991). Temne divination practice is an adoption of practices from outside of the Temne tradition. The divination of the Temne is from Mande practices.

Detection of witches by Tongo divination (sic) was a speciality of the Kpa-Mende, north of the Sherbro area in Sierra Leone.

=== Togo ===
Rudolph Blier made a study of the diviner in the context of the health care system of the Batammaliba peoples of northern Togo. The upon is the word for the divinator of these peoples, and the upon fulfils additionally the role of a health consultant. The upon is in fact central to health care provision within the Batammaliba and Gar-speaking peoples.

Ewe people of south Togo are consulting fa or Afa when the face some differents trouble in their life. It is the base of their traditional religion or ancestors religion.

== See also ==
- Greek divination
- Iyalawo
- Kuba divination
- Mesopotamian divination
- Obi divination
- Opele
- Opon Ifá
