= Abu Mashari Faraki =

Book

- Language: Arabic
- Subject: Health problems
- Genre: Divination
- Publication place: East Africa

The Abu Mashari Faraki is an Arabic-language book used for divination in East Africa.

== Book-based divination ==
The lamuli diviners of the Banyole of Uganda use books such as the Abu Mashari Faraki, Quran or Sa'atili Habari for divination, often to answer questions about their client's health. Ali bin Nasoor, an Omani trader who lived in Busolwe, is thought to have introduced the use of books for divination. Other Arabic or Swahili traders supported the practice. The diviner selects a text at random from the book and reads it aloud in Arabic to their client. They then translate it into the local language, and explain how it relates to the client's problem. The Abu Mashari Faraki says what has caused the problem and how should be treated with medicine or ritual. More specifically, it may help the diviner know the type of person who is responsible for his client's problems, where to find buried medicine and the type of sacrifice that should be made.

== See also ==
- African divination

== Sources ==
- Olupona, Jacob K. (2014), African Religions: A Very Short Introduction, OUP USA, ISBN 978-0-19-979058-6, OCLC 1002983837
- Reynolds Whyte, Susan (1997), Questioning Misfortune: The Pragmatics of Uncertainty in Eastern Uganda, Cambridge Studies in Medical Anthropology, vol. 4, Cambridge University Press, ISBN 978-0-521-59558-2
