= Busolwe Public Library =

Ugandan community library

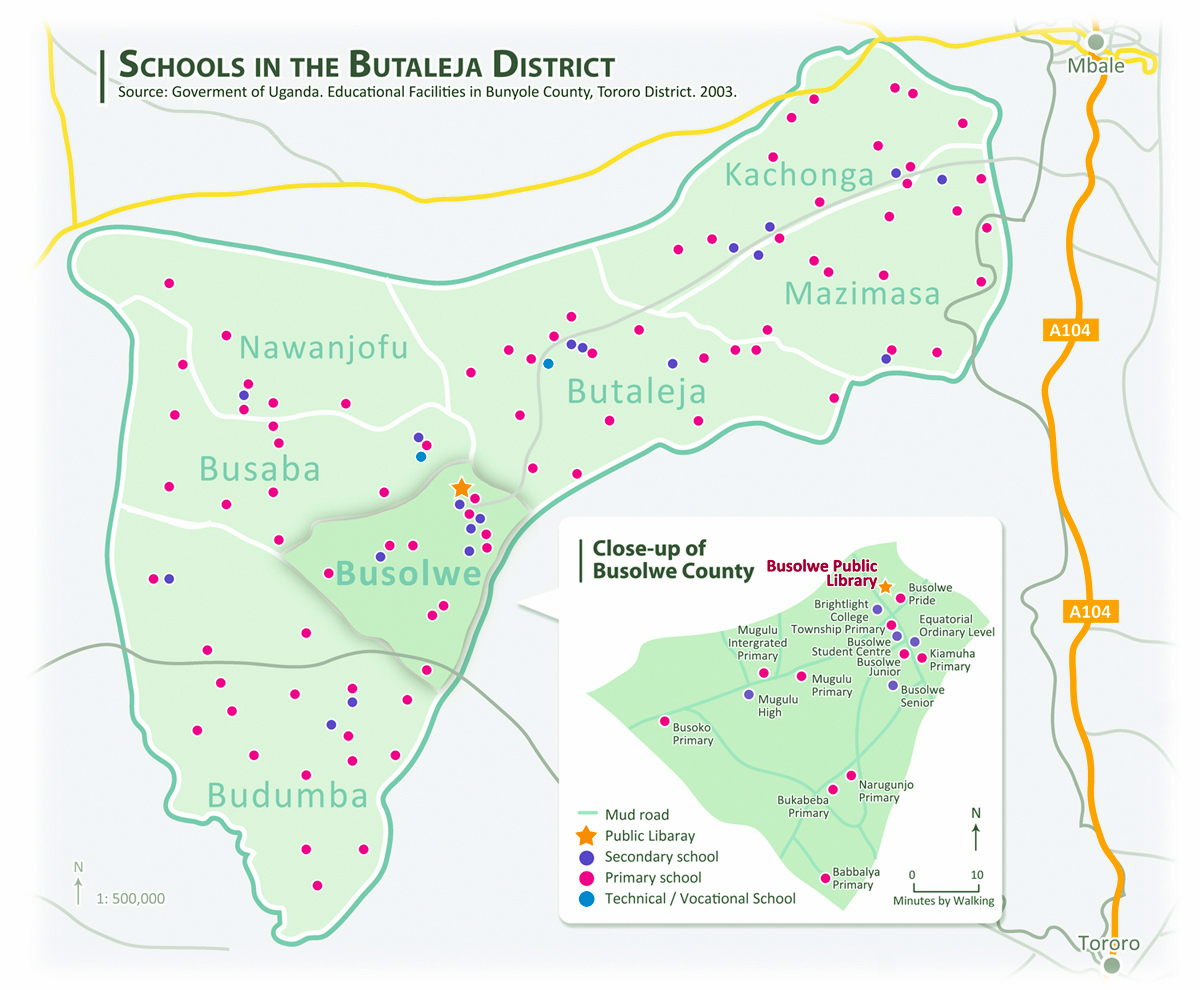
- 0.8517538035398469°N 33.925557962849176°E
- Location: Busolwe sub-county, Butaleja District, Uganda
- Established: 1996
- Branches: 1

Collection
- Size: approximately 900 books (as of June 2010) available in English, Luganda & Lunyole

Access and use
- Population served: Busolwe sub-county (est.pop:8,500) (2011)

Other information
- Director: The BPL Board
- Funding: The Lunyole Language Association, Go Global University of British Columbia, public donations
- Website: Busolwe Public Library

Busolwe Public Library, or the BPL, is a small community library in the village of Busolwe, eastern Uganda. The library consists of two schools and a center for Early Childhood Development (ECD) in order to improve the overall reading culture in the locality and to serve as an extension for learning beyond the classroom. It is part of the Uganda Community Libraries Association (UgCLA).

== History ==
The Busolwe Public Library (BPL) was established by the Lunyole Language Association (LLA) in 1996. BPL is the only community library serving Butaleja District in Eastern Region, Uganda which consists of over 200,000 people. Throughout its history, the library has had the opportunity to work with a number of organizations based outside of Uganda, such as Peace Corps and Go Global University of British Columbia. International partnership characterizes the continued growth and success of the library.

== Library vision ==
As books are rarely found in average households in Busolwe, BPL aims to improve the overall reading culture in the locality. It also seeks to serve as an extension for learning beyond the classroom by offering school textbooks to students who do not have access to them at school and at home.

With a collection of books in the vernacular language Lunyole, BPL aims to contribute to the preservation of the language, which is one of the many endangered Niger–Congo languages in sub-Saharan Africa.

== Library patrons ==
Patrons of the BPL consist mainly of students, teachers, and other concerned professionals who spend their leisure time reading. Young children under the age of 7 also come to the library to listen to stories read aloud by the librarian and volunteers. On average, more than 30 community members come to the library every day in order to read and study.

== Partner organisations ==
Uganda Community Libraries Association (UgCLA)

The Uganda Community Libraries Association (UgCLA), an association bringing together all the community libraries in Uganda was launched to promote easy access to books and improve the reading culture in the country. As a member of the UgCLA, BPL is given a monthly stipend to employ a full-time librarian and also to purchase books and stationary. The UgCLA also organizes workshops for librarians to be trained twice a year and other specific workshops throughout the year which focus on different techniques and approaches to learning.

Lunyole Language Association (LLA)

The Lunyole Language Association (LLA) was founded in 1964 to actively promote the use of Lunyole in Uganda. Its objectives were: to be a unifying factor for the Banyole, to preserve and develop the Lunyole language, to preserve the Lunyole culture that is not detrimental to Banyole, to promote literacy among the Banyole, and to translate literature from other languages into Lunyole.

University of British Columbia (UBC)

The University of British Columbia (UBC) has begun a partnership with BPL since 2008, and sends over student volunteers through its Go Global International Service Learning Program. From working together, the local community members and international volunteers have enjoyed a fruitful partnership, leading rise to many of BPL's currents projects in the community.

Local schools

The library also partners with many local schools to promote both the library and the reading culture through collaborative projects. These projects range from story-reading, safe sex seminars to reading competitions.

=== The local schools include ===
Primary schools

- Busolwe p/s
- Busolwe Junior academy
- Nalugunjo p/s
- Marron
- Busolwe Parent
- Townshop
- Mango

Secondary School

- Busolwe sss
- Busolwe student centre
- alliance High school
- Equatorial college Busolwe
- Town College Busolwe
- Busolwe Bright light college
- Mugulu high

== See also ==
- Busolwe
- Kitengesa Community Library
- Butaleja District
