= Banyole =

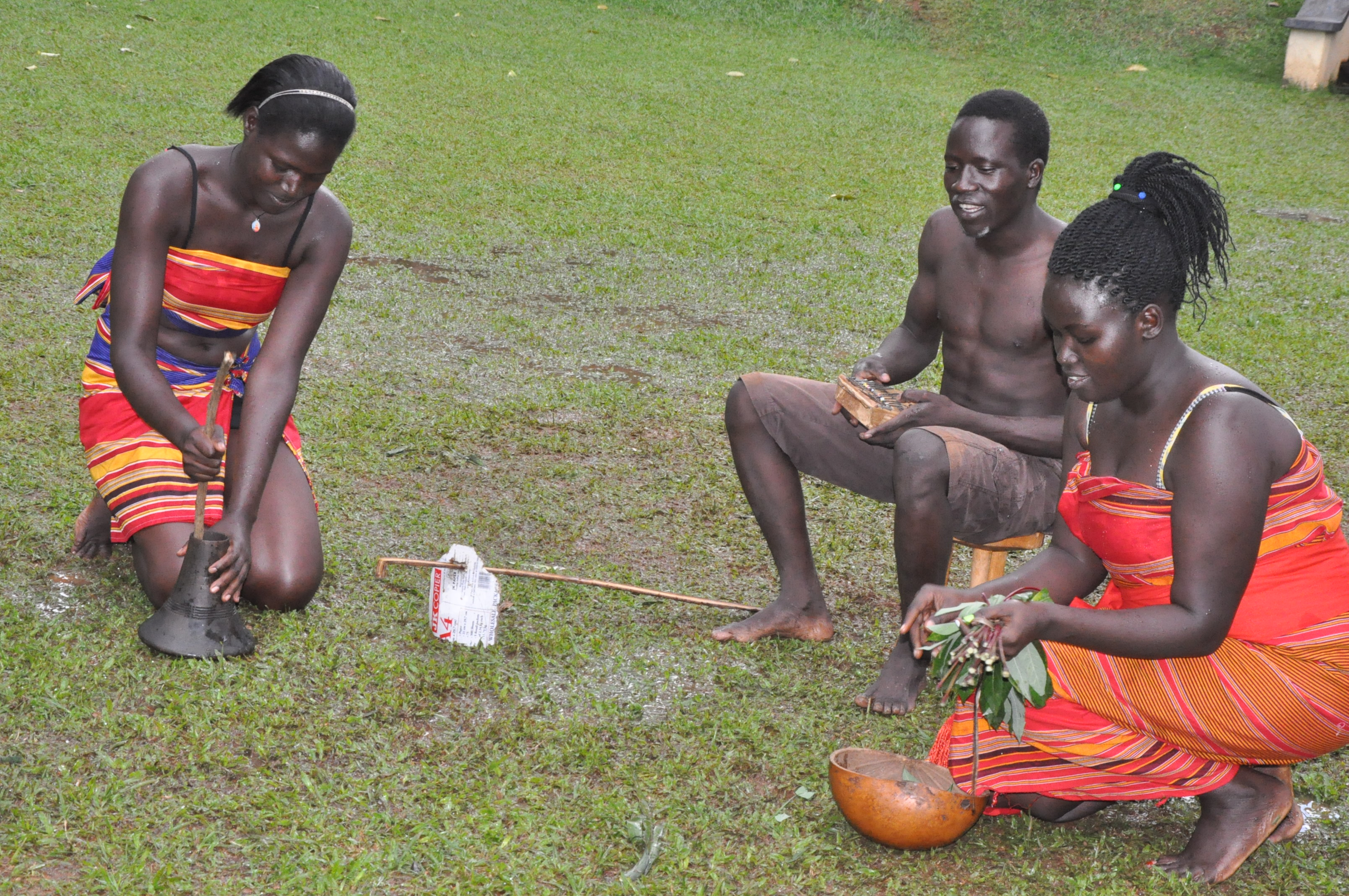
- Banyoli man playing musical instrument for his two wives, one making alcohol and the other sauce.

Total population
- 530,120

Regions with significant populations
- Uganda

Languages
- Nyole, English

Religion
- Christianity, Islam, traditional faiths

Related ethnic groups
- Masaba people and Luhya people

The Banyole or Banyuli are a Bantu ethnic group of Uganda that live mainly in Butaleja District.

== Ethnicity ==
The Banyole are one of the smaller Bantu ethnic groups in Uganda. They are sometimes called "Abalya Lwooba", meaning "mushroom eaters". They speak the Nyole language. They are mostly polygamous, and are divided into many clans. They have similar language and traditional customs to the Bagwe people, and like the Bagwe claim origins with the Banyala of Kenya. The traditional founder of the Banyole came from near the point where the Yala River enters Lake Victoria. He was named Omwa and lived 45 miles (72 km) west of their present location. They were forced to move east due to pressure from Nilotic people.

According to a 2014 report by the Uganda Bureau of Statistics the Banyole population is about 300,000. Possibly there is confusion with speakers of the related Nyole language of Kenya. In September 2019 the clan leaders of the Banyole elected their first cultural head. At least 148 clan leaders participated. There was controversy because one of the two candidates was not a resident of the district.

== Location and economy ==
Locations in Uganda

The Banyole were one of the ethnic groups in the plains between Lake Kyoga to the west and the slopes of Mount Elgon to the east when the British established the Bukedi District in this area at the start of the 20th century. Bukedi district also contained Gisu people in the populous and mountainous northeast, and several other ethnic groups in the western and southern plains including the Nilotic Teso people and the Bantu Gwere people. The plains peoples were mostly acephalous.

The Banyole today live mostly in Butaleja District in the east of Uganda. They also live in the nearby Budaka, Mbale, Tororo, Bugiri, Namutumba and Pallisa districts The surrounding peoples are the Gisu people to the east, Adhola people to the south, Soga people to the west and Gwere people to the north. The Banyole typically live by subsistence agriculture. The region is one of rolling grassland surrounded by papyrus swamps. The land is now densely populated and mostly cultivated. Rice, cotton and coffee are grown for cash. Their staple food crop is finger millet, and they also grow sorghum, maize, cassava and sweet potato.

== Religion ==
According to the 2002 Census of Uganda about 56.2% of the Banyole tribe are nominally Christian, mostly Anglican estimated at 42.6%. Due to low levels of literacy and lack of Christian texts in their language they have only a basic understanding of this religion, and may also follow traditional religious practices. About 41.6% have converted to Islam.

=== Divination ===
Nyole diviners, known as lamuli, commonly practice invocation as a form of divination. When a person is visibly afflicted (usually determined by change of character, wellness, vocal exclamations, etc.), lamuli will ask "ohwebusa" in an attempt to ask a potentially malignant spirit who they are. Lamuli are used by Nyole people solely to determine the causes of misfortune, which is believed to be the cause of malignant or upset spirits. It is believed by the Nyole people that the possession of a person is largely due to the spirits of his kin, who may feel as though the afflicted person has not done enough to honor them or their legacy. There are three main types of unhappy kin spirits. The first are known as ohulama or ohung'waba, and are older family members such as grandparents. The second type are ancestor spirits known as emigu j'abafu, and the third type are known as ekuni, or "clan spirits".

The lamuli also use books for divination. The books used by the lamuli might be The Holy Qur'an, the Sa'atili Habari and the Abu Mashari Faraki. Divination by the use of books is thought to have begun by way of the first influence of Ali bin Nasoor, a trader from Oman who settled in Busolwe, and also by the influence of other Swahili or Arabic traders. Findings of an investigation made by S. R. Whyte found that the majority of people (in the sample) went for divination consultations for reasons of their own bad or failed health.

== See also ==
- Buganda
- Acholi
- Gisu

== Sources ==
- "Banyole Culture", Uganda Travel Guide
- Heald, Suzette (1989), Controlling Anger: The Sociology of Gisu Violence, Manchester University Press, ISBN 978-0-7190-2566-2
- Olupona, J. K. (Harvard Divinity School) (2014), African Religions: A Very Short Introduction, OUP USA, p. 48, ISBN 978-0-19-979058-6
- Owen, W.E. (1932), "The Bantu of Kavirondo" (PDF), Journal of the East Africa and Uganda Natural History Society, Nairobi
- Peek, P. M. (Drew University) (1991), African Divination Systems: Ways of Knowing, Indiana University Press, pp. 2, 3, 4, ISBN 978-0-253-34309-3
- "Police deployed as Banyole clan leaders elect first cultural head", Daily Monitor, 2019-09-21
- The Banyole People, Wycliffe UK Ltd
- Whyte, Susan Reynolds (1990), "Uncertain Persons in Nyole Divination", Journal of Religion in Africa, 20 (1): 41–62, doi:10.2307/1581424, ISSN 0022-4200, JSTOR 1581424
- Whyte, S.R. (University of Copenhagen) (1997), Questioning Misfortune: The Pragmatics of Uncertainty in Eastern Uganda, Cambridge University Press, ISBN 978-0-521-59558-2
