= Mesopotamian prayer =

Prayers performed in ancient Mesopotamia

Mesopotamian prayer are the prayers of ancient Mesopotamia. There are nine classifications of poem used within Mesopotamia.

== Prayers ==
One definition of prayers of Mesopotamia is "praise to god followed by request".

According to one source (Bromiley) the form of the word, known and used to signify prayers during the Mesopotamian era, is described today as šu-il-lá. With regards to šu-il-lá, the scholars Lambert, van der Toorn and Oshima posit an alternative use for the term, which they submit is instead with reference to the way in which a prayer is to be recited, not a general signifier (rubric) for prayer itself (a notion expressed by Bromiley).

Šu-il-lá is held to refer to an act of praying, by prayer exhibited by either lifting of hands, to lift hands, or to lift the hand.

== Types ==
Prayers are divided into the following classifications: Incantation prayers, Ershaḫungas, Gottesbriefe, Ikribus, Royal, Tamitas and other queries, Hymns, Šigû, and Namburbi.

=== Incantation ===
Tribal specialists in ritual were required to perform incantations to accompany the use of texts known, for example, from Ugarit which are attested to contain ways to aid in the removal of snake-venom. Ugarit is also known to have contained additional health-related incantation texts.

=== Gottesbriefe ===
The term Gottesbriefe is literally, petition-prayers, or letter prayers. Gottesbriefe is a modern German word. It can be literally translated into both God´s letters or Letters for/to/about God. They were mostly in the form of pleas for relief from illness and for the deliverance of personal longevity.

=== Ikribus ===
These prayers were performed for the purposes of divining.

Another source shows ikribū were benedictions.

=== Royal ===
The rulers' (Kings of Babylonia) prayers were made to a variety of deities, for example Marduk (the god of Babylonia), Nabû, Ŝamaš. The kings had inscribed prayers made onto cylinders made of clay and kept within buildings, in order to fulfill this function. Prayers of this type tended to not be for reason of the seeking of mercy and salvation as is found in Šuila prayers.

=== Hymns ===
By study of the prayers, it seems apparent to scholars, that these types of prayers seem to be reformations of earlier topos made, for example, in a similar vein to prayers such as the Prayer to the Gods of the Night.

=== Šigû ===
Šigû are lamentations. Lamentations are either complaints, or expressions of grief or sorrow. Both meanings are related (combined) within šigû.

=== Namburbi ===
Prayers of this classification were performed during namburbi rituals. These rituals were undertaken firstly if an omen announced a fate that was evil, and a person wished to counter-act the fate, and secondly to counter witchcraft.

== See also ==
- Mesopotamian divination
- Ancient Mesopotamian religion

== Sources ==
- J. Hehn, Hymnen und Gebete an Marduk (published 1905) as shown here
