= African magic =

African magic is the form, development, and performance of magic within the culture and society of Africa and the diaspora.

== Meaning of the word magic ==
The word magic might simply be understood as denoting management of forces, which, as an activity, is not weighted morally and is accordingly a neutral activity from the start of a magical practice, but by the will of the magician, is thought to become and to have an outcome which represents either good or bad (evil).

Ancient African culture was in the habit customarily of always discerning difference between magic, and a group of other things, which are not magic, these things were medicine, divination, witchcraft and sorcery.

=== In relation to witchcraft ===
E.K. Bongmba finds Witchcraft, Oracles and Magic among the Azande by Evans-Pritchard (published 1937) responsible for a reduction in appreciation of the value of magic as a definite subject of study. Peter Pels (1998) posits failing in thought similarly stemming from a mis-aligned focus on the negative aspect of witchcraft representing the totum of magic.

=== Comparison to religion ===
Opinion differs on how religion and magic are related to each other with respect to development, or which developed from which. Some think they developed together from a shared origin; some think religion developed from magic; and others think magic developed from religion.

== Types ==
There are two types of magic, good, or magic which is used to do well and enhance well-being, and bad, which is magic used to do harm or wrong or evil.

== Roles ==
The traditional roles related to and of magic in African society is medicine-man, divinator, rain-maker, and priest-magician.

=== Medicine men ===
These are at the simplest understanding people who function within a tribal setting as herbalists.

=== Rain-maker ===
Rain-makers are thought to possess magical powers, although they possess these powers because they (the powers) are given them by the sky God or the Great Spirit. Rain-making is something which requires both religion and magic.

=== Priest-magician ===
The priest-magician must grasp reality in many ways; understand the nature of climate, the forms of energy of the universe, the functions of material objects. The priest-magician controls forces of nature, and in doing this therefore has to understand how control of forces impacts upon perception and the human consciousness and minds of people. He or she fulfills his or her role by exercising the intellect and discerning a way forward while under the possession or control of a spirit or force of a divinity, to which he or she is a servant.

== Anti-roles ==
=== Sorcerers ===
With particular reference to people dwelling within the Southern areas of Sudan, individuals who are found to have been stricken with illness or misfortune are sometimes identified as having succumbed to the influence of sorcerers.

== See also ==
- Traditional African religions
