= Dolar Popat =

Ugandan-British politician (born 1953)

The Right Honourable The Lord Popat FCA
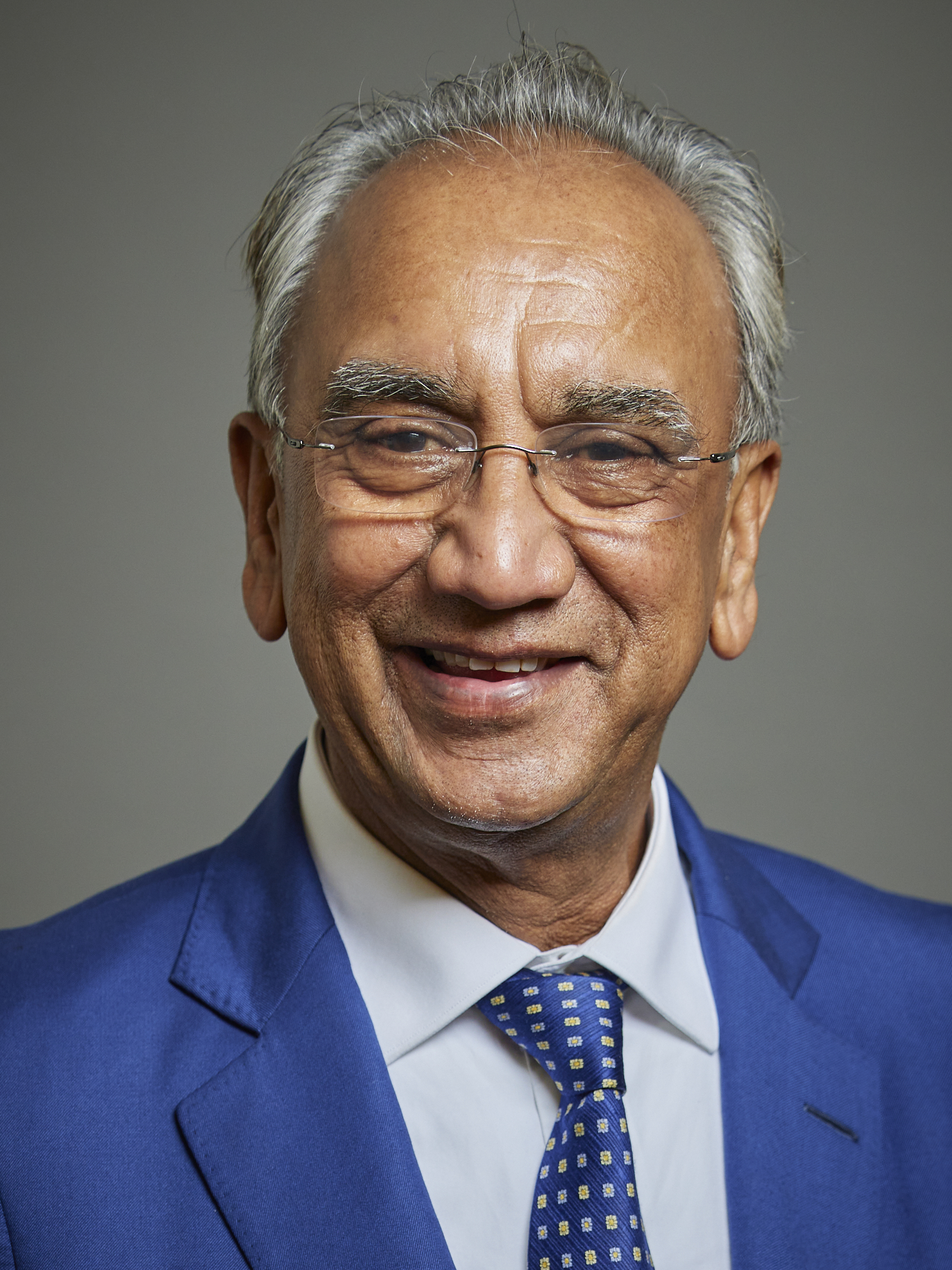
- Official portrait, 2023

Lord-in-waiting Government Whip
- In office 9 January 2013 – 7 May 2015
- Prime Minister: David Cameron
- Preceded by: The Viscount Younger of Leckie
- Succeeded by: The Earl of Courtown

Member of the House of Lords
- Lord Temporal
- Life peerage 10 July 2010

Personal details
- Born: Dolar Amarshi Popat; 14 June 1953 (age 73) Busolwe, Uganda
- Party: Conservative
- Spouse: Lady Sandhya Popat
- Children: 3, including Paavan Popat
- Education: Kilburn Polytechnic; Chartered Institute of Management Accountants
- Website: Official website

Dolar Amarshi Popat, Baron Popat (born 14 June 1953) is a Ugandan-British politician, accountant, businessman and Conservative life peer in the House of Lords.

He became a Member of the House of Lords in July 2010 and is the first Gujarati to represent the Conservative Party in the upper house. From January 2013 to March 2015 he served as a Minister of the Crown at the Department of Business, Innovation and Skills, and the Department for Transport. He was Lord-in-Waiting, with the duties of a party whip. He was subsequently appointed as the Prime Minister's Trade Envoy to Rwanda and Uganda in January 2016.

== Early life ==
Dolar Popat was born in 1953 in Busolwe and was brought up in Tororo, Uganda. He arrived in the UK in 1971 at the age of 17, a year before the expulsion of Indians in Uganda in 1972. Popat sponsored himself through night school at Kilburn Polytechnic by taking on jobs including working as a dishwasher, waiter, and grill chef at a Wimpy burger bar on Kilburn High Road. He later qualified as an Affiliate of the Chartered Institute of Management Accountants (CIMA) in 1977 and went on to practise specialising in business and corporate finance. He diversified into the healthcare sector in the late 1980s and the hospitality sector in the late 1990s, and secured a master franchise with the Intercontinental Hotels Group for Express by Holiday Inn in the UK.

On 16 July 2019 (Guru Purnima), Popat unveiled his autobiography, A British Subject: How to Make It as an Immigrant in the Best Country in the World.

== Career ==
After completing his studies, Popat held a number of positions, including trainee accountant at Rockware Glass and UDT Finance (Barclays). After practicing as an accountant in the 1970s, he specialized in business and corporate finance. Popat diversified into the health care sector in the late 1980s and the hospitality sector in the late 1990s, securing a master franchise with the Intercontinental Hotel Group for Express by Holiday Inn in the UK.

== Politics ==
Popat is an advocate of community cohesion and the importance of reconciling and uniting different cultures under the UK's central democratic process. Before his elevation to the House of Lords, he was an active supporter of the Conservative Party, acting as a party adviser to help engagement with the British Indian community to the Thatcher, Major and Cameron governments.

Popat has advocated that the Conservative Party is a union where enterprise, hard work and social responsibility are respected and encouraged, and that these are values which the British Indians naturally share. He has worked to bridge the gap between the Conservative Party and the British Indian community and believes that the Party and the community will mutually benefit from a deeper and sustained engagement and understanding.

In 2009 Lord Popat was honored with an award at the Asian Political and Public Life Awards at the House of Commons by the Conservative Party's then chairman, Eric Pickles MP, for promoting the Conservative Party in the community. In May, 2010 it was announced that he would be ennobled on the recommendation of David Cameron, for his services to small and medium-sized businesses and to the wider community. He was created a life peer on 10 July 2010 taking the title Baron Popat of Harrow in the London Borough of Harrow, since it was there that his parents lived upon arriving in the UK. On 31 March 2011 he made his maiden speech in the Upper House, contributing to a debate about economic growth.

He was the first chairman of the Conservative Friends of India, an organization launched by the then Prime Minister, David Cameron in April 2012. Lord Popat stood down as chairman for Conservative Friends of India in January 2013, after his appointment as a Government Whip and Lord-in-Waiting. During this time helped to establish a Select Committee, chaired by Lord Cope of Berkeley – examining ways in which the Government can help SMEs to export, and on 6 December he held his first debate in the House of Lords, marking the 40th anniversary of the expulsion of the Ugandan Asians.

Popat was appointed a Government Whip and Minister of the Crown in January 2013, succeeding Viscount Younger of Leckie. Lord Popat was also appointed a Lord-in-Waiting and made the Government Spokesperson in the House of Lords for the Department for Business, Skills and Innovation and the Department for Transport until May 2015.

In February 2013, Lord Popat accompanied the Prime Minister, David Cameron on the British trade delegation to India. In January 2016, he was appointed as the Prime Minister's Trade Envoy to Rwanda and Uganda.

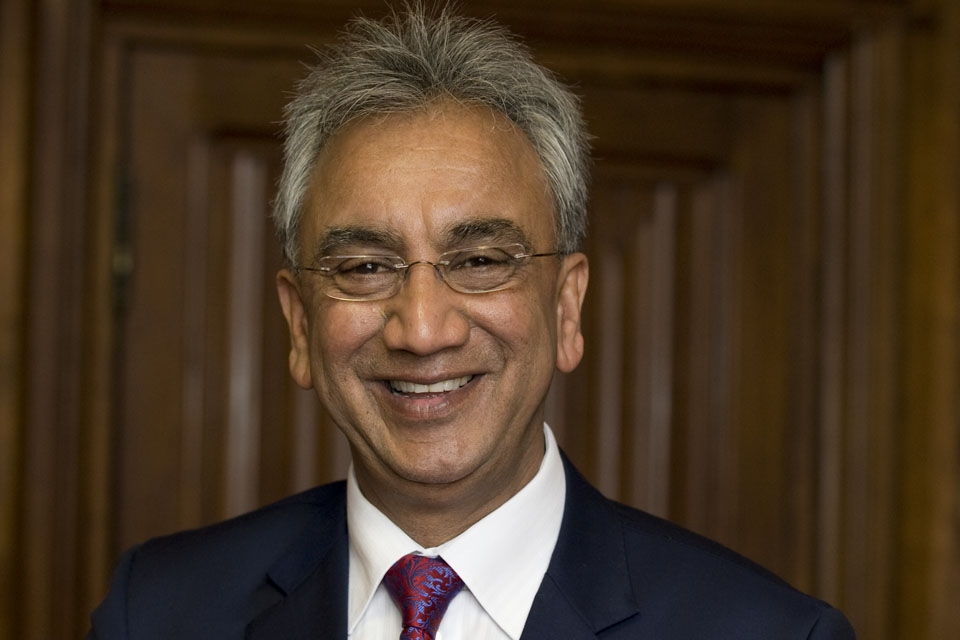
Popat, 2013 (Conservative peer)

Lord Popat considers himself a "child of Africa" and in January 2016 he was appointed as the Prime Minister's Trade Envoy to Rwanda and Uganda – the latter being his home country. In October 2020, the Prime Minister added the Democratic Republic of Congo to his roster. Prime Minister Boris Johnson thought that this would open various trade and investment opportunities for UK businesses in the nation. Lord Popat regularly meets with organizations and entrepreneurs to encourage bilateral trade between the UK and these countries. Emerging markets such as those within the Commonwealth offer great opportunities for the next generation of businesses in the UK.

As UK trade envoy, Lord Popat has led several British delegations to Rwanda and Uganda: one in Rwanda in March 2019 where he led a horticultural business delegation and another in Uganda in June 2019 with a delegation of agritech firms.

In August 2019, Lord Popat published his memoirs "A British Subject – How to make it as an immigrant in the best country in the world". The book is a love letter to Britain, the country he calls home. Upon its release, the book received a number of positive reviews. Not withstanding the title and content of his book and his documented history as a refugee who settled in the UK, in an article published 25 April 2022 on the website 'politicsathome.com' he argued that the current asylum system is abused by economic migrants. He also argued that there is good reason for others now seeking refugee status in the UK, to be sent instead to Rwanda, a country with a well documented history of genocide within its own borders.

== Personal life ==
Popat is a Hindu and follower of the teachings of Morari Bapu, whom he regards as a Guru and mentor in life. He married Sandhya (now The Lady Popat) on 19 July 1980, with whom he has three sons. He speaks four languages including Gujarati, Hindi, and Swahili, and supports Tottenham Hotspur Football Club. He has also owns a German Shepherd dog and enjoys cricket.

In the charity sector, Popat is on the board of St Luke's Hospice, Harrow, and has his own charitable foundation, Lord Dolar Popat Foundation, which makes contributions to medical and educational institutions. He became a trustee of Prism The Gift Fund in July 2019.

== See also ==
- List of British Indians

Orders of precedence in the United Kingdom
Preceded by The Lord Wills	Gentlemen; Baron Popat	Followed by The Lord Macdonald of River Glaven
