= Greek divination =

Ancient Greek methods of consulting their gods

Greek divination is the divination practiced by ancient Greek culture as it is known from ancient Greek literature, supplemented by epigraphic and pictorial evidence. Divination is a traditional set of methods of consulting divinity to obtain prophecies (theopropia) about specific circumstances defined beforehand. As it is a form of compelling divinity to reveal its will by the application of method, it is, and has been since classical times, considered a type of magic. Cicero condemns it as superstition. It depends on a presumed "sympathy" (Greek sumpatheia) between the mantic event and the real circumstance, which he denies as contrary to the laws of nature. If there were any sympathy, and the diviner could discover it, then "men may approach very near to the power of gods."

The Greek word for a diviner is mantis (pl. manteis), generally translated as "prophet" or "seer". A mantis is to be distinguished from a hiereus, "priest," or hiereia, "priestess," by the participation of the latter in the traditional religion of the city-state. Manteis, on the other hand, were "unlicensed religious specialists," who were "expert in the art of divination." The first known mantis in Greek literature is Calchas, the mantis of the first scenes of the Iliad. His mantosune, or "art of divination" (Cicero's mantike, which he translates into Latin as divinatio), endowed him with knowledge of past, present, and future, which he got from Apollo (Iliad A 68–72). He was the army's official mantis. Armies of classical times seldom undertook any major operation without one, usually several. Mantosune in the army was a risky business. Prophets who erred were at best dismissed. The penalty for being a fraud was usually more severe.

== Types of mantis ==
One of the characteristics of Greek mantic culture is "a contrast between official and independent practitioners." On the official side were the internationally recognized oracles, who divined under the auspices of a specified divinity according to a specified method, had their own temple at a specified location, and were supported by their own priesthood; for example, the Oracle of Apollo at Delphi, the Oracle of Zeus at Dodona, and so on. Although these oracles were located in sovereign city-states, they were granted a political "hands-off" status and free access so that delegations from anywhere could visit them.

The English language has reduced mention of mantic pronouncements to one word, "oracle," based on Latin oraculum, which can also mean the mantic center. This double meaning is true in ancient Greek and Latin also. The Greeks and Romans did not have a standard word that would apply in all cases. Manteion (μαντεῖον), psychomanteion (ψυχομαντεῖον) and chresterion (χρηστήριον) were common in Greek. A prophecy might be referenced by the name of the god: "Apollo said ..." or "Zeus said ...." or by the name of the location: "Delphi says ..." etc. Implication was common: hieron, "the sacred [pronouncement]," fatus meus, "my fate," etc.

The other type of mantis was the independent consultant mentioned above. The important generals and statesmen had their own prophets, to avoid such difficulties as Agamemnon experienced, when Calchas forced him to sacrifice his daughter and ransom his female prize in the opening of the Iliad. Privately hired manteis, such as Alexander used, never seemed to disagree with command decisions, or if a possibly negative prophecy was received, made sure that it was given the most favorable interpretation. By that time, based on what Cicero said, the leaders were probably skeptical of prophecy, but the beliefs of the superstitious soldiers were a factor to be considered.

The extispex (a diviner who predicts the future using entrails) in Greek was called ἡπατοσκόπος and σπλαγχνοσκόπος.

== Oracles ==
Oracles were known institutional centers committed to vatic practice, as opposed to individual practitioners for hire. The most generally known and commonly used ones were located at Delphi and Dodona These had the status of being national and even international centers, even though there was as yet no nation of Greece, but there were a great many more scattered over Hellenic territory. States did not hesitate to send delegations to different oracles over the same issue, so that they could compare answers. Oracles that prophesied most successfully became popular and flourished. The least successful oracles were abandoned.

Part of the oracular administration was thus a team of what today would be called political scientists, as well as other scholars, who could perform such feats as rendering an oracle into the language of the applicant. The team also relied on information gleaned from the many visitors. The larger oracles were to a large degree intelligence centers posing as prophets. The cost was covered unknowingly by states and persons eager to make generous contributions to the god. As no one also would steal from a god, the center's administration included banking and treasury functions as well. Thus, the wealth of an oracle was available for confiscation by kings and generals during a war or other national crisis.

=== Summary of ancient Greek oracles ===
The ancient Greek oracles are known through references to them in ancient Greek literature, supplemented in many cases by archaeological information. The references were collected in the 19th century by the editorial staff of the classical encyclopedist, William Smith. A tabular summary follows. It has been necessary to supplement some of Smith's scanty descriptions with information from his sources, especially Plutarch Lives, Moralia and De Defectu Oraculorum.

Summary of ancient Greek oracles
Location	Deity	Epithets	Lifespan	Method
Abae at Kalapodi in Phocis	Apollo	Unknown	Prehistoric through classical. First mention 6th cent. BC, burned and abandoned in Third Sacred War, 346 BC, sympathetic partial restoration by Trajan.	Unknown, resulting in Delphi-like oracular statements
Claros near Colophon in Anatolia	Apollo	Clarius from the name of the temple	Legendary founding (Bronze Age). The epigoni having sent Tiresius and Manto as a gift to Delphi. Manto was told to build an oracle at Colophon, which she did jointly with Cretans. Originally a pool from a spring in a grotto. Earliest structure 9th century BC. Last use 4th century.	After a sacrifice a priest would drink the water and begin to reply in verse to a question known to the applicant but not to him.
Delphi, formerly Pytho in Phocis	Apollo, Poseidon, Gaia	Phoebus	Prehistoric times through early Christian times, when it was abandoned.	The divinity was believed to speak in the ravings of a chosen priestess seated on a tripod over a natural chasm from which toxic gas exuded. The time was chosen and sacrifice and payment must have already happened. The ravings were interpreted and versified by other chosen priestesses.
Dodona	Zeus, Dione (feminine of Zeus)	Pelasgian, Naios	Prehistoric through classical. Burned by Romans 167 BC.	Originally interpretation of the rustling of oak leaves, later, of the sound of wind chimes made of bronze pans, or pans and bones.
Eutresis, Boeotia	Apollo	Eutresites	There is one mention of it. Stephanus of Byzantium (the encyclopedist) says that a noted temple and oracle existed there, but not how far back it went. The settlement precedes the Bronze Age and is known in the Linear B tablets as Eutresis. It was burned and abandoned, to be reoccupied in the Archaic Period, and not abandoned until the mid-1st-millennium. When it lost the oracle remains unknown.	Nothing is known of its practices.
Hysiae, Boeotia	Apollo	Unknown	Mentioned once in Pausanias 9.2.1. At that time (2nd century) Hysiae was in ruins but a half-finished temple to Apollo was probably built after the Boeotians took the village from Athens in 507 BC. It was short-lived, being destroyed at the Battle of Plataea in 479 BC.	Those "drinking" from the concomitant sacred well "prophesied," but Pausanias does not say who or how. As the drinking occurred "anciently" (palai} the well may have preceded the temple.
Miletus, Anatolia	Apollo and a "twin" (didymus), either Zeus or Artemis	Didymaeus, the god of the Didymaion or Didyma, both grammatical neuters referring to the building	Before the Persian Wars the oracle was the hereditary property of the Branchidae family, descendants of the legendary Branchus. Their absence from Homer suggests an Archaic Period foundation, archaeologically in the 8th century BC. The Persian King burned the temple and transported the Branchidae. Miletus chose by lot a board of yearly priests. The oracle was finally abandoned after the death of Julian the Apostate	The sources suggest a foundation from Delphi, as in the later phase a priestess, a sacred spring, and a tripod are mentioned. Nothing else known.
Olympia	Zeus, Gaia, Themis	Kataibates ("thunderer")	Classical period	Examination of entrails, observation of the flames of burnt sacrifice before the altar of Zeus
Ptoon, Mount in Boeotia	Apollo	Ptoian	7th through 4th centuries BC by archaeology.	Inspired priest speaking from a grotto in which was a spring. A mountainside temple was nearby.
Siwa Oasis, Egypt	Zeus	Ammon (Amun)	Classical, abandoned under the Romans	Interpretation of the changing sheen of an emerald-encrusted statue of Zeus-Ammon being carried in procession. Oasis water was believed to confer the power of divination when drunk. There were priestesses, as Alexander interpreted an offhand statement by one that he was irresistible as a prophecy of military prowess.
Smyrna, Anatolia	Apollo	Unknown	One mention of it in Pausanias 9.11.7 as contemporary with the oracle of Apollo Spodios at Thebes.	Pausanias says that it was the greatest center of cledonomancy, which was conducted in the "Temple of the Utterances" outside the walls above or beyond (hyper) the city.
Tegyra, Boeotia	Apollo	Tegraios	Prehistoric to 5th century BC; abandoned after the Persian Wars	Apollo spoke through the mouth of an oracle located in a temple between two springs, the sources of rivers. Sacrifice was first required. The agent or supposed agent of inspiration is unknown.
Thebes, Boeotia	Apollo	Ismenian, from Ismenaion, the temple	Mentioned in the literature describing the legendary wars of Thebes; that is, in the Bronze Age before the Trojan War. The site had been sacred to the pre-Greek, Pelasgian population, who now shared it as a sacred site. 15th-century BC Mycenaean artifacts found there suggests it had been Hellenized by that time. Three temples to Apollo were constructed, 8th through 4th century BC. The last, being incomplete, probably marks the abandonment after a destruction by Alexander the Great	The site was on a hill called Ismene to the south just outside the gates. A spring on it fed the Ismene River, but the name has mythical significance. In front of the temple of cedar on a stone called Manto's chair (Manto was Tiresias' daughter) sat a lad chosen yearly examining sacrificial fires and the entrails of sacrificial victims and rendering prophetic conclusions.
Thebes, Boeotia	Apollo	Spodios ("of the ashes" meaning of the charred bones of sacrificial animals from which the altar was constructed)	Exact location unknown. The prophecies were given during or after the sacrifice. The origin is lost, but the type, cledonomancy (Greek kledon, plural kledones, "utterance," is known from the earliest literature. The oracle must have come to an end with the others when Alexander destroyed them all in Boeotia.	The type is identified by Pausanias: "prophecy of utterance." In it the inspired person speaks with an unsuspected double meaning, one being oracular. For example, in the Odyssey, one of the suitors prophecies his own murder by wishing Odysseus in the guise of a beggar the success of all his plans.

=== Oracular deities ===
==== Zeus ====
Zeus was the major god of the ancient Greek divine panoply. He commanded men and gods alike. Ideologically he was the guardian of justice (themis), the patron of the state, and the final arbiter of destiny. Etymologically he descends from the Proto-Indo-European sky god, root *dyeu-, "shine," applied to the daylight sky, who, judging from his appearance in different descendant cultures, such as the Indic and the Roman, had the same status. Thunderstorms were the mark of his immediate presence, and lightning bolts, made of sacred fire, were his weapons.

The literary fragments suggest that Aristotle's view was generally believed, that the first Hellenes were of the tribe of the Selloi, or Helloi, in Epirus and that they called the country Hellopia. If these fragments are to be believed, Epirus must have been an early settlement location of Indo-Europeans who were to become Greek speakers by evolution of the culture, especially language. They took over a center of worship of the former culture, called by them "Pelasgians," introducing Zeus, and from then on had responsibility for the shrine and oracle of "Pelasgian Zeus," becoming "Dodonaian Zeus."

As to when these settlement events may have occurred, the decipherment of Linear B, writing of about 5000 baked clay tablets found at known Greek prehistoric centers, opened a whole new chapter in Greek history, termed by most "the Greek Bronze Age." Zeus is represented in those tablets in both masculine and feminine form. The masculine does not have a nominative case, but does have a genitive, Diwos, and a dative, Diwei. The feminine, Diwia, is distinct from Hera, who appears on her own. These deities are mentioned in tablets recording offerings to them.

Zeus was known as Zeus Moiragetes, which is to refer to the power of Zeus to know the fate of mortals. The newly born Zeus himself learnt his fate by the night and, accordingly, by Phanes, while within a dark cave.

Herodotus stated the earliest oracle was the oracle of Zeus located at Dodona, although archaeological remains at Delphi date to earlier. There was an oracle at Dodona from the 5th century BCE, although the oracle of Zeus might have still have had a practice at the same locus earlier, prior to construction of the temple, a possibility which seems probable since the temple remains show an oak tree at the location.

==== Apollo ====
Apollo, the most important oracular deity, is most closely associated with the supreme knowledge of future events which is the possession of Zeus. Apollo was known as Apollo Moiragetes, referring to Apollo as the god of fate. The oracle at Delphi gave oracles from Apollo.

Apollo in an oracular function is associated with both plague, purification and truth. Even though the prophecies given by him were ambiguous, he is said to have never uttered a lie.

Apollo's oracle at Delphi is the most famous and was the most important oracular site of ancient Greece.

According to Homer and Callimachus, Apollo was born with prophetic abilities and the power of reading the will of Zeus. However, a less popular belief is that he was instructed by Pan in divination as found within myth.

==== Apollo and Hermes ====
Apollo transfers to Hermes a skill in cleromancy, upon the request of Hermes. Speaking within the hymn, Apollo expounds on the difficulty he experiences with his own divination, and then proceeds to provide the gift of divination to his brother Hermes, though a lesser skill, because the mantic dice are not under the control and influence of the will of Zeus. Hermes' skill at divination, though inferior to the skill of Apollo, is still of a divine nature.

The gift of Apollo is bee maidens with oracular abilities.

===== Hermes =====
Hermes is associated with divination by lottery, otherwise known as cleromancy.

The triad of bee maidens are prophetic via Hermes.

==== Pan and the nymphs ====
In Arcadia Pan was the principal oracular deity, instead of Apollo. Prophecy is associated with caves and grottoes within Greek divination, and the Nymphs and Pan were associated variously with caves. Panolepsy is a cause of inspirational states of mind, including abilities of a mantic nature.

==== Prometheus ====
The god Prometheus gave the gift of divination to humanity.

Aeschylus wrote Prometheus Bound during the 5th century BCE in which Prometheus founded all the art of civilization including divination. This he did by stealing fire from the gods and gifting this fire to humankind. The 5th century BCE telling is a re-telling of a story told by Hesiod within the 8th century BCE

== Independent consultants ==
Greek history and literature also relate stories of independent manteis consulted on specific occasions.

=== Calchas ===
Calchas was the first known mantis of Greek literature, appearing at the beginning of Book I of the Iliad. He was employed by the Greek army. His divination required the sacrifice of the commander's daughter to obtain the winds to bring the Greek fleet to Troy.

=== Tiresias ===
Of all oracles of ancient Hellenic culture and society, a man named Tiresias was thought as the most vital and important.

== Methodologies ==
Greek practice made use of various techniques for divination.

=== Classification ===
Belief in divination was widespread in ancient Greece. In De Divinatione, Cicero argues with his brother, Quintus, against divination, which Quintus has espoused. The latter argues that if the gods exist, they must communicate with man, and if divination is proved to be true, then the gods must exist. He offers Marcus a classification of divinations, which he says is ancient: “There are two classes of divination, one of which is of art, the other, of nature.” Cicero's reply is that there may or may not be gods, but even if there are, there is no logical necessity that they communicate through divination.

In essence, the artificial divination is staged. The divinator uses reason and conjecture to set up an experiment, so to speak, testing the god's will, such as determining to look at certain quarters of the sky at certain times for the presence of certain kinds of birds. Cicero's reply is that the set-up is already a predisposition. Events that happen according to natural law are given surcharges of prejudicial meaning, when the outcomes are really attributable to chance. In the natural type, such as dreams, spontaneous occurrences are given subjective interpretations based on expectations.

These same types appear in modern sources under different names; for example, E.A. Gardner in the Oxford Companion to Greek Studies refers to “direct” or “spontaneous” and “indirect” or “artificial” divination, which turn out to be Quintus Cicero's “of nature” and “of art” respectively. In direct divination, a divinator might experience dreams, temporary madness, or phrensy (frenzy); all these states of mind being considered inspiration of truth. The divinator typically must take steps to produce such a state. Attested techniques include, sleeping in conditions whereby dreams might be more likely to occur, inhaling mephitic vapour, chewing bay leaf, and drinking of blood. In indirect divination the divinator does not experience any inspiration himself but observes natural conditions and phenomena.

Under the influence of this scientific view, recounted by Marcus Cicero, that the phenomenal world is driven by natural law, whether or not there is any divinity, the pre-Christian emperors suppressed artificial, or indirect, divination, attacking its social centers, the oracles, as political rivals. Christianity at first was treated as a superstitious cult. The need for the population to feel that they were in direct communication with divinity, however, was overwhelming. The state, unable to make any headway against it, gave in to it finally when Constantine became the first Christian emperor. Constantine had a direct divinatory experience himself on the night before the Battle of the Milvian Bridge, in which he dreamed he saw a cross and the words “in this sign you shall conquer.” Going forward under the sign of the cross he won, and converted to Christianity.

From then on believers had a new word for the results of divination, the sign. The old, indirect divination was gone, classified as an abomination by the Christians. Christian writers, such as St. Augustine, began to write extensively of signs from God and the uses of signs by humans to mean religious matters or outcomes. Under this guise Quintus’ classification appeared again as “evoked” for “of art” and “spontaneous” for “of nature.” The contest between the scientific view, which rejects all divination as superstition, and the religious view, which promulgates signs, continues in the present times, along with generally discredited remnants of indirect divination, such as reading the tea leaves, or Chinese fortune cookies.

=== Typology ===
The following table lists types of divination known to have been practiced by the ancient Greeks.

Summary of the types of divination practiced by the ancient Greeks
Type	Definition	Examples	Notes
Aeromancy	Divination through the interpretation of atmospheric or aerial phenomena.		In ancient Greece an air-diviner was called aeromantis (ἀερόμαντις). and the practice was called aeromanteia (ἀερομαντεία).
Augury or Ornithomancy	Interpretation of the behavior, movements, direction and flight of birds.		
Cleromancy	Divination by the casting of lots, stones, or dice. Astragalomancy is a type of cleromancy performed by throwing the knuckle-bones of sheep or other ruminants (astragaloi) to be able to tell the future. As each face of the astragalos is assigned a numerical value, astragaloi can be rolled like dice and the resultant roll matched to a table of possible outcomes. A number of these tables were engraved on public monuments in southern Anatolia.		
Enodiomancy or Road-omen divination	Interpretation of encounters and events occurring while travelling.	For example, when you encounter someone carrying a particular object.	Polles wrote about this.
Enthusiasm	Inspiration or possession by divinity (en, "within"), a direct or natural method. The god may speak in ravings caused by ingestion of a substance, or in the ordinary conversation of an unsuspecting priestess.	The oracle at Delphi.	According to Bonnefoy, theolepsy is the possession by a god, which may be further qualified by the god's name: phoibolepsy or pytholepsy for Apollo, panolepsy for Pan, nympholepsy for nymphs.
Entomomancy	Divination through observation of the behavior and movements of insects.	The Suda mentions that some people observed the movements of the insect called Mantis (μάντις) for the purpose of augury.	There was also the phrase "arouraia mantis" (Ἀρουραία μάντις), which was a proverbial expression used to mock people who were sluggish and ineffectual but still treated as if they had wisdom or insight, comparing them to the insect, whose clumsy movements were nonetheless observed for augury.
Extispicy	Inspection of the entrails (that which was en, "in," was taken ex, "out.") of a sacrificial victim for the presence or absence of previously defined features, which would suggest application or denial of previously defined answers to the oracular question. The first organ examined was the liver (hepatoscopy). The victim might be any species of animal except humans. The pre-defined features depended on local tradition.	Oracle of Zeus at Olympia, Oracle of Ismenian Thebes, Oracle of Delphi. The military used this type most often. With regard to a planned campaign, they were allowed to continue to inspect entrails until they received a favorable answer, or conceded failure, although some were given a 3-sacrifice limit.	Extispicy came from Mesopotamia, where it was known from the 18th century BC, through the Anatolian cultures reaching Greece and Etruria independently. The question is when. The oracles using it in classical times originated in the Bronze Age but unquestionable direct evidence is in deficit. Homer does not portray it, but Prometheus teaches it to man in legend.
House-omen divination or Oikoscopy	Interpretation of unusual events occurring in or around the house as omens.	If a weasel or snake appeared in the house, or if oil, honey, wine, water, or ashes were spilled, or if wood made an unusual creaking sound.	Xenocrates has written a collection on it.
Hydromancy	Divination through water or phenomena associated with water.		
Necromancy	Divination through consultation of the human dead rather than the gods.		
Palmistry or Cheiroscopy	Divination based on the study of the hands and palms		
Pebble divination or Thriai	Divination by means of pebbles or small stones. The Thriai were personification of this type of divination.		Thriai (Θριαί) were pebbles used by seers, and a seer who used them was called a Thriovolos (Θριοβόλος; "thria-thrower").
Twitch divination	Divination through involuntary bodily movements, sensations or sounds.	A twitching of the right or left eye, shoulder or thigh, an itch in the foot or ringing in the ear.	Posidonius wrote about this.
Hiera and sphagia	Hiera is done at the campgrounds before battle. A sacrifice animal is eviscerated and the organs inspected (primarily the livers, but also the splagchna—kidneys, gall bladder, urinary bladder, perhaps the heart). Certain parts were also put on the fire, where their behaviour and that of the fire itself were observed. Sphagia is performed in front of a battleline before battle, and involves stabbing (not slitting) the throat of a sacrificial animal, often a young she-goat. The sacrificer holds the victim firmly between legs and a hand. The way the blood flows is then interpreted. Sphagia is also performed before crossing rivers or the sea, with the focus being blood flowing into water.	Phocion used this at Tamynae. At Plataea, Pausanias repeatedly performed sphagia while his men endured Persian fire. He kept doing that until he got a favorable omen.	More examples are collected in Pritchett The Greek State at War, Book 3, table 2 on p. 114.

== Ancient sources ==
Democritus advocated divination. Herodotus provided a record of the prophetic productions resulting from Delphi as well as several instances of augury. Dicaearchus dismissed any notion of the trueness of divination by any means other than dreams and frenzy. Aristophanes mentions an oracle in his comedy Knights. Aristotle wrote On Divination in Sleep, written 350 BCE. Posidonius attempted to elaborate a theory of divination; he envisioned the sight of the future, as a cable might unwind, so insight into the future unfolds within the mind. Chrysippus claimed empirical evidence for the truthfulness of divination. Plutarch advocated the divination at the Oracle of Delphi; he considered enthusiastic prophecy to be possible when the soul of the Pythia becomes incorporated with Apollo in an inner vortex internal to the Pythia. Cicero wrote a book On Divination. Xenophon recorded his own meeting with a diviner named Eucleides, in chapter 7 of his work Anabasis.

Pythagoras was said to have practiced divination. Socrates both practiced and advocated divination. Xenophon was thought to be skilled at foretelling from sacrifices, and attributed much of his knowledge to Socrates in "The Cavalry Commander".

== See also ==
- African divination
- Mesopotamian divination

== Reference bibliography ==
- Beerden, Kim (2013). Worlds full of signs: ancient Greek divination in context. Leiden, Netherlands: Koninklijke Brill NV. ISBN 9789004256309.
- Callan, Terrance (2010). "Prophecy". The Oxford Encyclopedia of Ancient Greece and Rome. Vol. I. Oxford, U.K.; New York: Oxford University Press.
- Chadwick, John (1973). Documents in Mycenaean Greek (2nd ed.). Cambridge, U.K.: Cambridge University Press.
- Collins, Derek (2008). "Mapping the Entrails: The Practice of Greek Hepatoscopy". The American Journal of Philology. 129 (3).
- Frigerio, Giulia (2023). A cognitive analysis of the main Apolline divinatory practices: decoding divination. Routledge monographs in classical studies. Abingdon; New York: Routledge. ISBN 9781032411521.
- Flower, Michael Attyah (2008). The Seer in Ancient Greece. Berkeley; LA; London: University of California Press. ISBN 978-0520252295.
- Gardner, E.A. (1931). "Mythology and Religion". Companion to Greek Studies. Cambridge, U.K.: Cambridge University Press.
- Johnston, Sarah Isles (2009). Ancient Greek Divination. John Wiley & Sons. ISBN 978-1444303001.
- Koch, Ulla Susanne (2010). "Three Strikes and You're Out! A View on Cognitive Theory and the First-Millenium Extipicy Ritual". Divination and Interpretation of Signs in the Ancient World (PDF). Oriental Institute Seminars Number 6. Chicago: University of Chicago.
- Peradotto, John J. (1969). "Cledonomancy in the Oresteia" (PDF). The American Journal of Philology. 90 (1): 1–21. doi:10.2307/293300. JSTOR 293300.
- Raphals, Lisa (2013). Divination and Prediction in Early China and Ancient Greece. Cambridge, U.K.: Cambridge University Press. ISBN 978-1107010758.
- Ustinova, Y. (2009). Caves and the Ancient Greek Mind: Descending Underground in the Search for Ultimate Truth. Oxford, U.K.: Oxford University Press. ISBN 978-0191563423.
