= Mesopotamian divination =

Divination within the Mesopotamian period

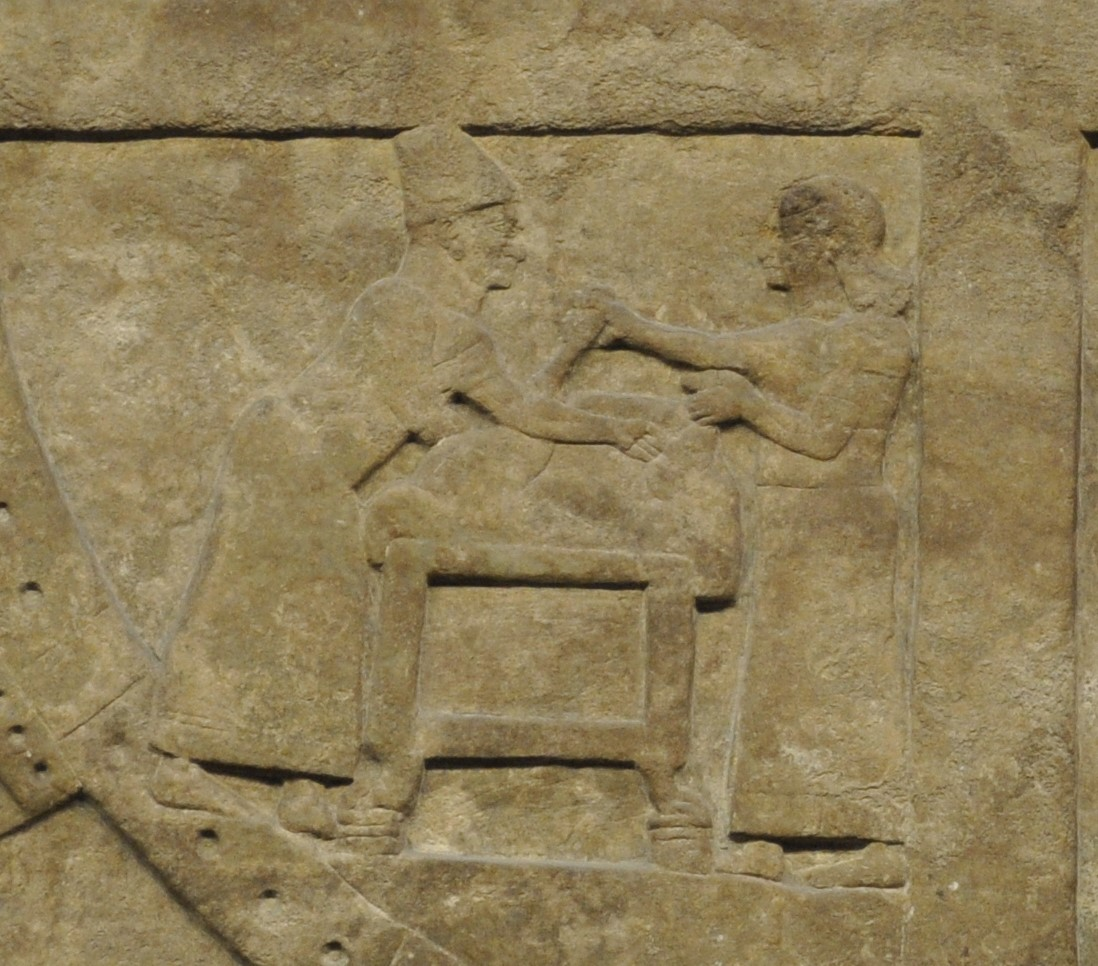

Mesopotamian divination was divination within the Mesopotamian period.

Perceptual elements utilized in the practice of a divinatory technique included the astronomical (stars and meteorites), weather and the calendar, the configuration of the earth and waterways and inhabited areas, the outward appearance of inanimate objects and also vegetation, elements stemming from the behavior and the birth of animals, especially humans.

Magic was used to counter a negative fate foretold by divination.

== Dating and development ==
The earliest evidence for practice is (dating is true to this article) from the fourth millennia B.C. (Sumeria), 2100 to 2000 BC (Neo-Sumeria) and 7th century BC (Babylonia), except for circa 2100 via the Babylonian Epic of Gilgamesh.

=== Sumer ===
The area of land known as Sumer, within Mesopotamia, had a settled population within the 5th millennia BCE.

A seal from Sumer, (of Mudgala, Lord of Edin, Minister to Uruas) shows the word Azu, which meant water-divinator (lit. water knower), and additionally, physician. Lord Mudgala was the son of Uruas the Khad, who was the first dynasty of Sumeria (via Phoenicia) of the fourth millennium BCE.

Another artifact from Sumerian culture, a death amulet seal, shows the name Uzu-as' and is a resurrection amulet for the slave and seer of the Temple of the Sun, Uzu-as'. The part of the name, the word Uzu, meant in Sumerian, diviner, magician, or seer.

=== Neo-Sumerian ===
There is some suggestion people of this era knew of, and were experiencing, dreams as portents and sources for divination. The Neo-Sumerian period was from circa the years 2100 to 2000 BC.

=== Babylonia ===
Most of the extant material showing evidence of divination practice are from the 7th century BCE and accordingly from Babylonian culture, which dates from 1850 BCE and later.

The Sumerian version of the Epic of Gilgamesh (circa 2100) has the mother of Gilgamesh interpreting a dream of Gilgamesh (a portent of the advent of Enkidu).

=== Development ===
Divination practice evolved through time from abductive positions to reckonings by virtue of an a priori, and a tendency to make generalizations about causes.

== Classification ==
Two types of divination existed in Mesopotamia, divine and human. Mesopotamian diviners most often used a liver for divination, or else by observing the sky.

Another difference delineated by Bottéro, is of two types of divination, both divine, but one artificial and the other natural; the artificial being divinations where through a process of "computation and constant observation" a future truth is gleaned; and natural, being a kind of gift from a god whereby direct inspired communication occurs from god to human.

Bottéro and Bahrani assert Mesopotamian divination was not just divination, and not limited in development to a type of superstition, but was developed to the extent to which it was in fact a science.

=== Divine ===
Study of portents from gods was vital within Mesopotamia throughout the entire time of its existence. The gods Šamaš and Adad were associated most closely with divination, Šamaš related to divination in decisions, and Adad for oracles and omens.

==== Celestial ====
Celestial divination was conducted for the purposes of the king and the state. Diviners observed the sun by day and the stars of the night sky, which they knew as šıṭır samé, or, šıṭır šamāmī, or, šıṭır burūmē (writing of the firmament). These three things refer to their thought of the stars of the sky interpreted as heavenly writing. By way of the celestial, this type of divination was one of Babylon's three related celestial sciences, along with astronomy and horoscopy.

The descriptions šıṭır šamê and šıṭırti šamāmī are found sometimes within Neo-Babylonian royal inscriptions in special reference to those temples thought of a beautiful in a way of those temples being (lit.) like the heavenly writing.

==== Impetration ====
Impetration is a type of divination which involved a diviner asking a deity to control a medium for the diviner to foretell the future. Media might include smoke, lots, or drops of oil in, or on, water.

=== Human ===
Divination by way of deductive thought whereby people understood the significance of forms and/ or, changes in a medium as showing and revealing a truth, is attested to within Old Babylonia, at a date of 1950 BCE

==== Hepatoscopy ====
Divination of this type involved using the liver, and possibly additionally the gall-bladder.

Examinining internal organs to make predictions is known as extispicy.

Extant sources reveal individuals were restricted from using extispicic means by a prohibitive cost for the performance of this divination so that royal members and nobles were mostly the only ones able to afford to know the future by this means.

Existing sources for knowledge of hepatoscopy are clay models of divined livers.

Hepatoscopic practice and belief began during the third millennium BCE. The practice is referred to in the Hebrew Bible in Ezekiel 21:21.

===== Practice =====
To make predictions, diviners had two things to aid their making of a divinatory statement – lists of previous predictions and clay models made of previously interpreted livers.

Hepatoscopic predictions were made on the entrails of slaughtered animals (Oppenheim) by observing any kind of abnormality within the organ, such as atrophy, hypertrophy, displacement, or any type of unusual marking.

===== Belief =====
In Mesopotamian culture, the liver was thought of as being the centre of thought and feeling.

==== Physiognomics ====
Study of the human body and foretelling of an individual's fate from this study is known as physiognomics. Diviners (or perhaps associated others) made and circulated these texts to successive generations, handing down knowledge for nearly two millennia.

Physiognomic divination omens, in the first extant recorded, date from a period 2000 - 1600 BCE

==== Dream interpretation ====
The Mesopotamian dream interpreter was known as ša'il(t)u.

==== Necromancy ====
Necromantic practice is shown by historical document to have begun from at least 900 BCE, and was relied upon for insight to a much greater extent within urban culture by the time of King Esarhaddon in the early 7th century BCE.

== Literature ==
In literature, Babylonian divination material very often does not appear in the contents within written introductories, making it difficult for any reader who might want to know the contents of the text.

Enūma Anu Enlil is a text of conclusions of divination.

Šumma alammdimmǔ is a series of omens made by physiognomics dating to the close of the second millennium BCE. They are inscribed upon 27 clay tablets.

== History of study ==
The study of divination within Babylonian culture belongs to the discipline of Assyriology and began in earnest sometime during the decade of the 1870s.

== See also ==
- African divination
- Greek divination
- Mesopotamian magic
- Mesopotamian prayer
