= River Manafwa =

River in Eastern Uganda

Coordinates: 0.9420°N 33.920°E

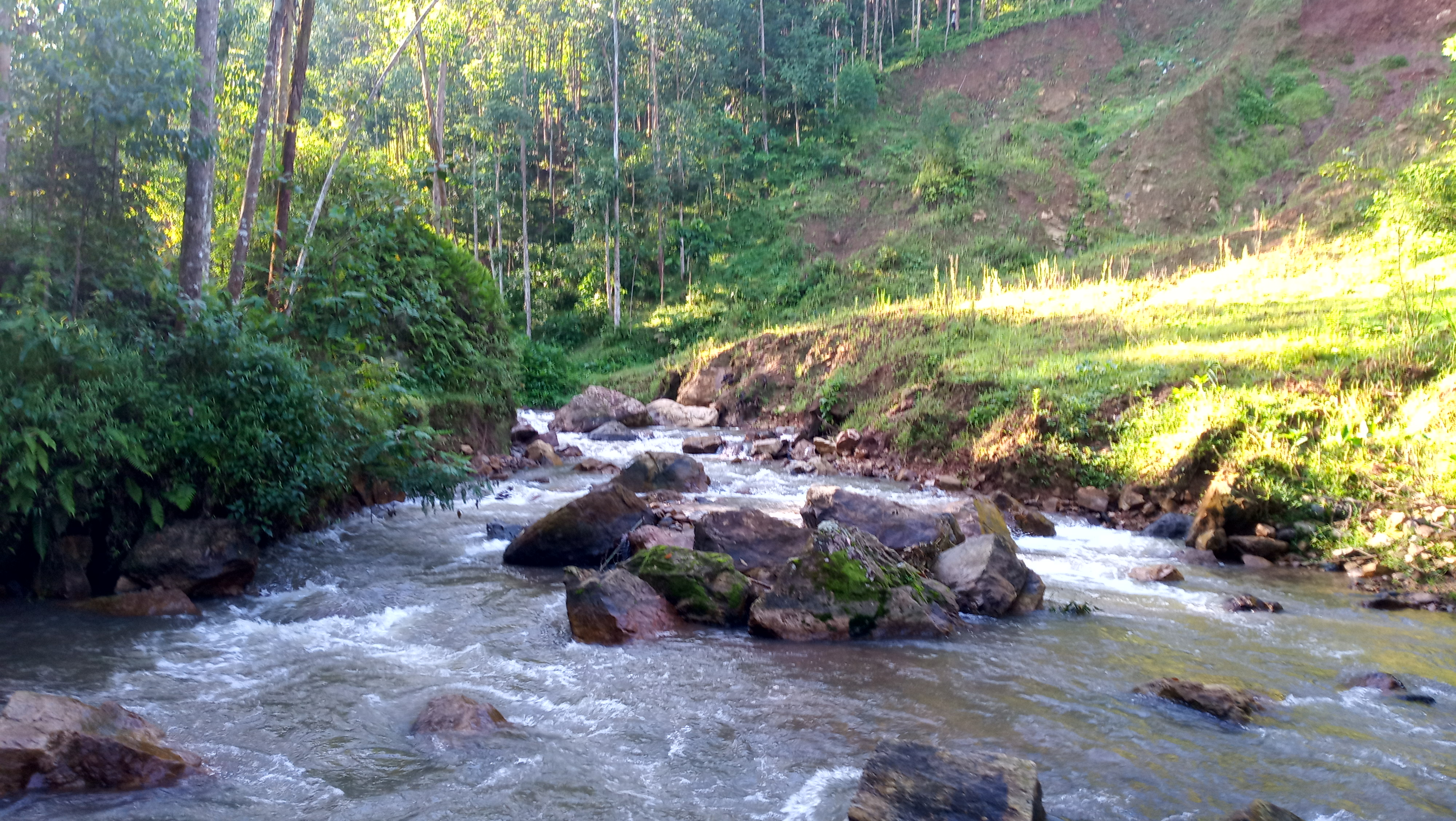
- River Manafwa in Bududa District

- Mouth of River Manafwa

Location
- Country: Uganda
- Region: Eastern Uganda
- Districts: Bududa, Manafwa, Mbale, Butaleja
- Cities: Mbale

Physical characteristics
- Source: Mount Elgon
  - location: Eastern Uganda
- Mouth: Mpologoma River
  - location: Butaleja District

Basin features
- Progression: Mpologoma River → Lake Kyoga
- River system: Mpologoma River system

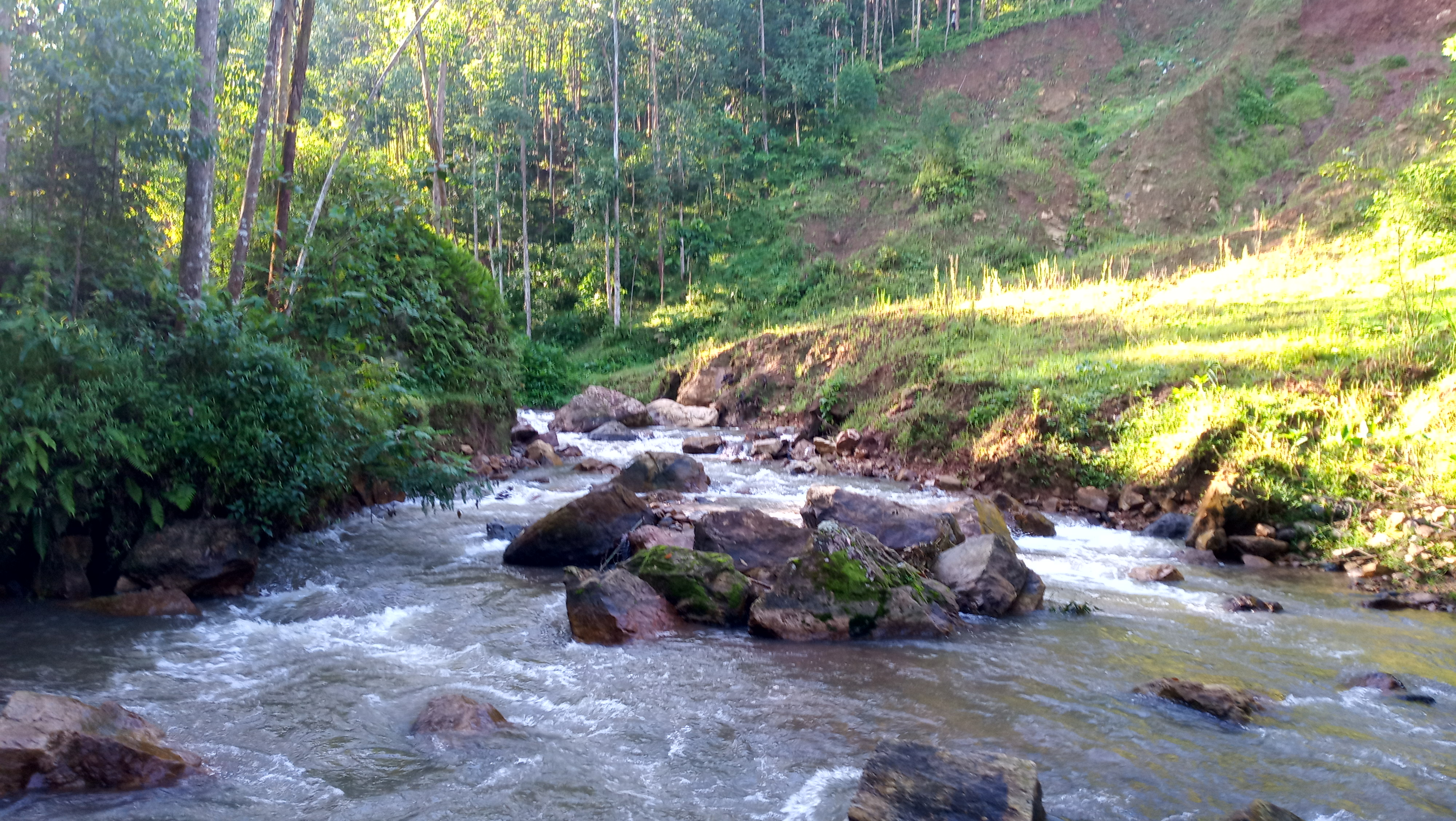
River Manafwa in Bududa District

River Manafwa is a natural river found in Eastern Uganda. The river originates from Mount Elgon in eastern Uganda, and traverses the districts of Bududa, Manafwa, Mbale and Butaleja. It joins the Mpologoma river, which empties into Lake Kyoga. The river basin is prone to flooding, which disrupts transportation between the Bududa and Manafwa districts, and has resulted in damage to buildings and deaths.

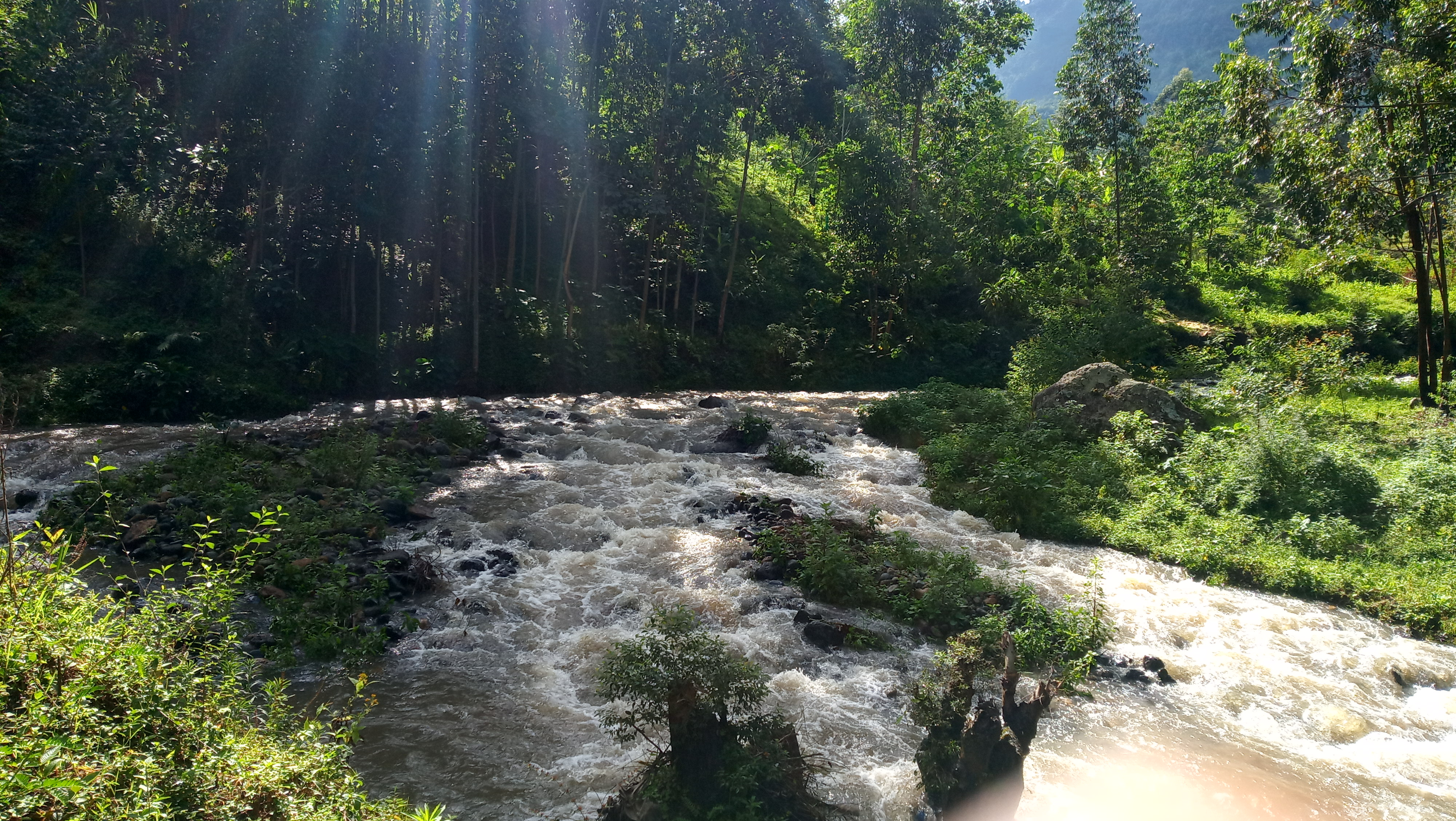
Manafwa water fall

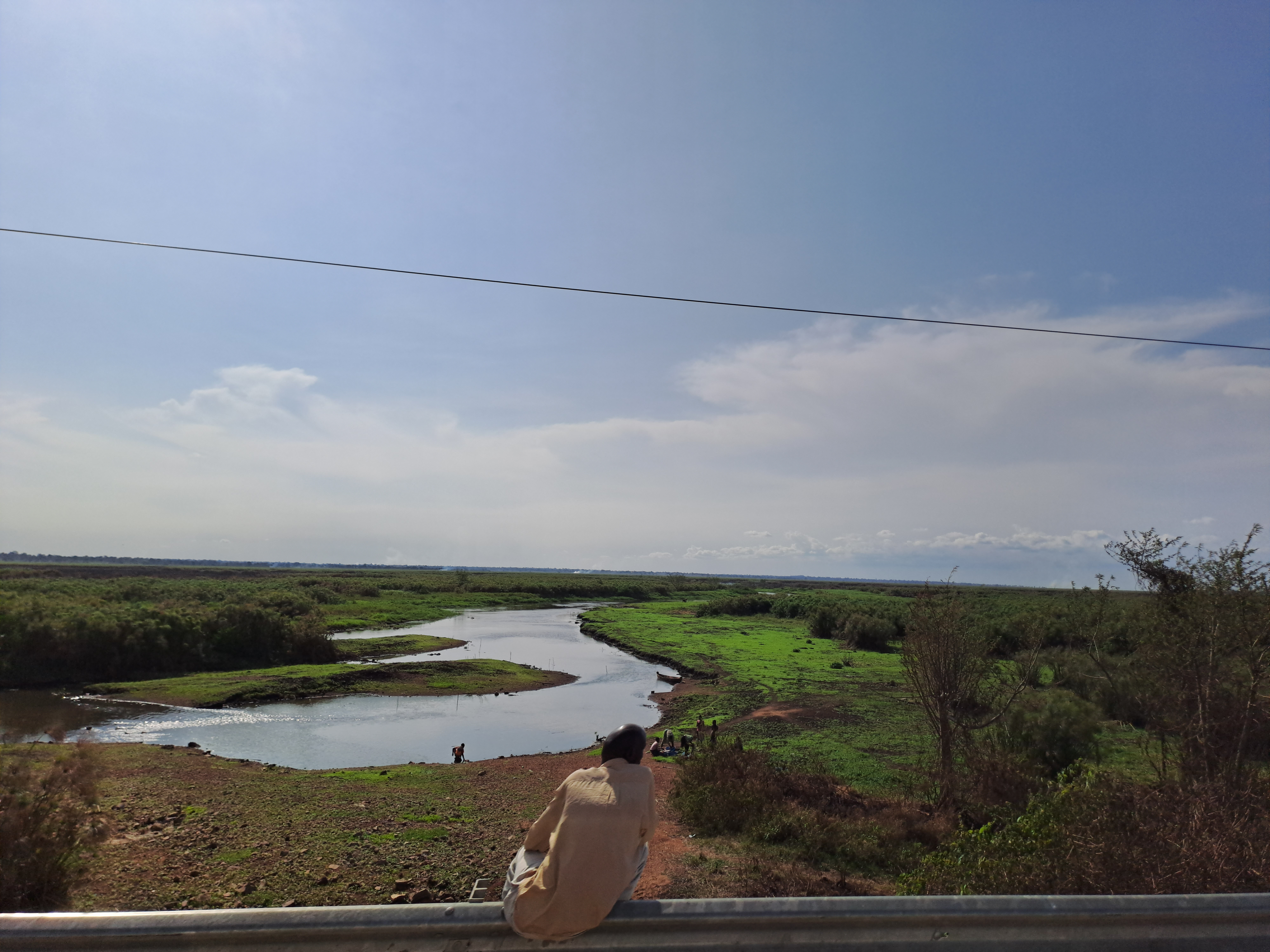
Mpologoma River which joins to R. Manafwa emptying into Lake Kyoga

The River Manafwa basins have for long been of great socialeconomic importance to the population in the region. The river area possess phosphate and iron deposits with quarry sites around the river. These quarries are a source of income for indigenous people who produce aggregate stones, hardcore and sand mining along the river beds for the construction industry. The river is also a source of water to surrounding areas.

== Geographical location ==
River Manafwa lies along coordinates of (1.089092, 34.46106) and coordinates of (0.943084, 33.98428). And it flows along the Uganda - Kenya border in Manafwa district mainly.

== Hydrology ==
Manafwa river falls under the Kyoga Water Management Zone and its characterized by bimodal rainfall (April-June, August-November), extreme flooding leading to high Surface runoff. The river is also highly sedimented since the surrounding areas have high level vegetation loss resulting into soil erosion.

== Importance ==
River Manafwa has both economic and social importance to the community. It provides water for domestic use, irrigation, brick making, sand mining, scenic beauty for tourism.

== Challenges ==
The river is facing numerous issues related to environmental degradation such as pollution, silting, sedimentation. These problems are due to human activities such as deforestation, and climate change.

== See also ==
- Lake Kyoga
- Mount Elgon
- Butaleja district
