= Busolwe General Hospital =

- Uganda Ministry of Health

Geography
- Location: Busolwe, Butaleja District, Uganda
- Coordinates: 00°50′58″N 33°55′45″E

Organisation
- Care system: Public
- Type: General

Services
- Emergency department: I
- Beds: 100

History
- Founded: 1970

Links
- Lists: Hospitals in Uganda
- Other links: Hospitals in Uganda

Busolwe General Hospital, also Busolwe Hospital, is a hospital in Busolwe Town, Butaleja District, in the Eastern Region of Uganda. It is a public hospital, owned by the Ugandan Government and is administered by Butaleja District Local Government.

== Location ==
The hospital is located in the central business district of the town of Busolwe, about 50 kilometres (31 mi) southwest of Mbale Regional Referral Hospital. The coordinates of Busolwe Hospital are: 0°50'58.0"N, 33°55'45.0"E (Latitude:0.849449; Longitude:33.929156).

== Overview ==
The hospital was built in 1970. Since it was commissioned, the hospital infrastructure has not received any refurbishment or re-equipping. The buildings need renovation and remodeling.

== Renovations ==
In 2008, the Government of Uganda signed a debt swap agreement, with the Kingdom of Spain involving the creation of a Trust Fund. The resources of that trust fund will be used to construct and equip Kawolo General Hospital and Busolwe General Hospital. The renovations, which are expected to take four years, include the following:

1. Renovate existing staff housing 2. Build new staff houses 3. Build a new Emergency department (Casualty department) 4. Build a trauma ward 5. Build new operating rooms (operating theatres) 6. Build a new mortuary with cold facilities 7. Build a new, bigger maternity ward, with antenatal wing 8. Build new operating rooms dedicated to obstetric cases 9. Construct a water reservoir with capacity of 144,000 liters (31,676 imp gal; 38,041 U.S. gal) 10. Rehabilitate existing water sources and install solar-powered pumps 11. Procure an ambulance for emergencies and a double cabin pick-up for outreach services. As of July 2019, those planned renovations had not been carried out yet.

== See also ==
- List of hospitals in Uganda
- Busolwe
- Butaleja District
