= Kuba divination =

Kuba Divination is a form of divination used by the Kuba people of central Africa.

Kuba divination is practiced by specialists called ngwoom. According to historian John Mack, divination is used to gain access to the knowledge which only the spirits, called ngesh, possess about the source of social and physical ills which may affect a community. It serves two main purposes: detection of thieves, and determining the cause of illness.

== Ngwoom ==
Kuba diviners (ngwoom) maintain the proper relationship between ngesh and humans. Even with the establishment of Christian church congregations in many Kuba communities during the 20th Century, ngwoom and other specialists whose expertise derives from ngesh continue to practice.

== Itoom ==
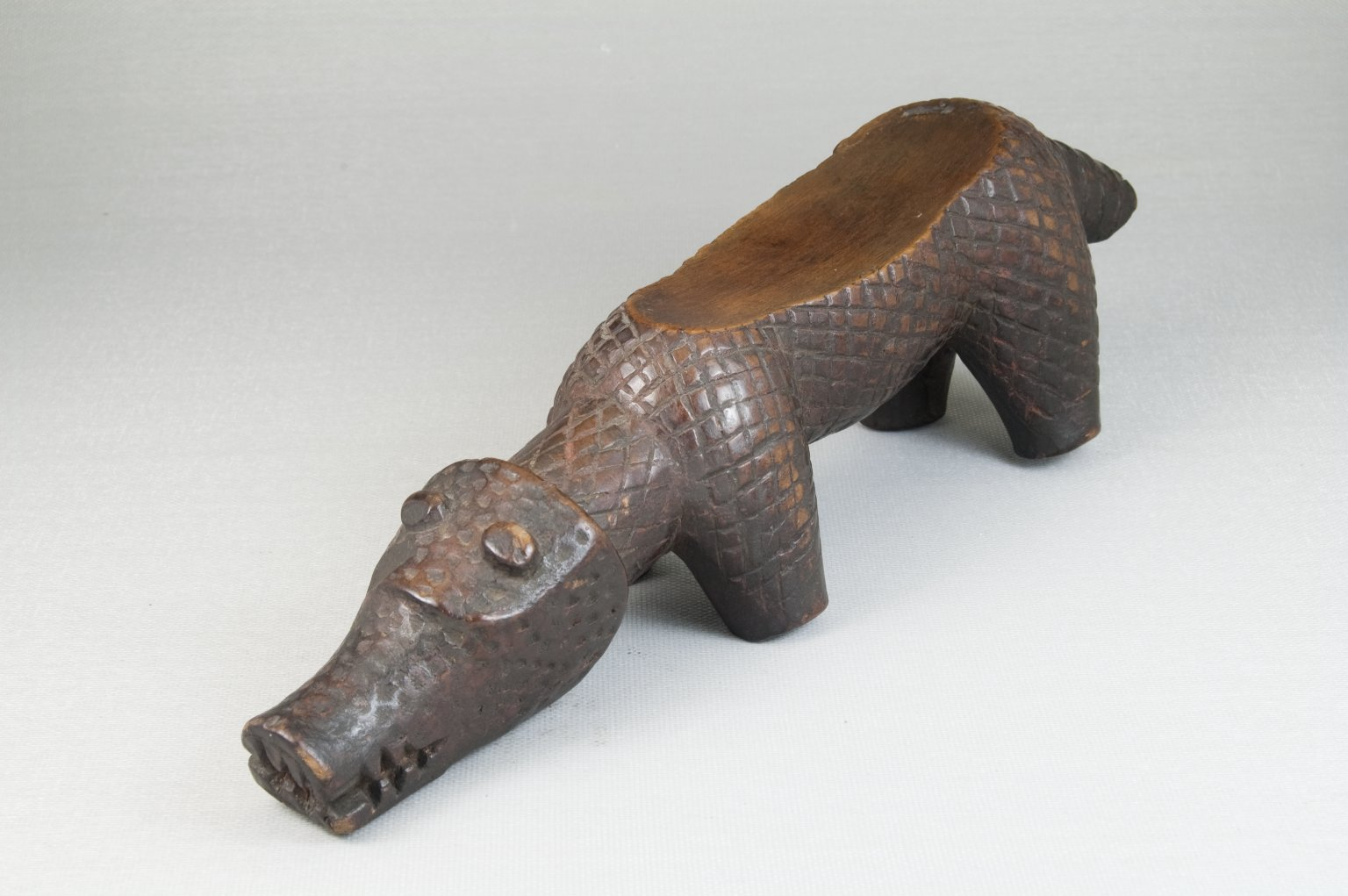
Kuba itoom, divining discs missing, from the collection of the Brooklyn Museum

Rubbing oracles (itoom) were used by Kuba ngwoom during the nineteenth and the first half of the twentieth centuries. This practice was adopted from the related Kete and employed extensively by the Kuba.

Itoom all functioned in the same manner: a small wooden disc with a smooth base and a projecting knob was rubbed across the surface of the itoom by the ngwoom while he or she uttered a series of names or formulas. When the moving disk abruptly stopped, the desired information was disclosed.

Most itoom were created in the form of a naturalistic or abstract representation of an animal. The most common animals represented, such as the crocodile, warthog, lizard, and dog, were associated with the forest and surrounding natural habitat.
