= Obi divination =

Yoruba system of divination

Obi divination is a system of divination used in the traditional Yoruba religion and in Yoruba-derived Afro-American religions. In Yorubaland, it uses palm or kola nuts; in Latin America and the Caribbean it uses four pieces of coconut.

Obi divination is also interconnected with Ifá and Iwa Pele.
