= Butaleja =

Human settlement in Eastern Region, Uganda

- Location in Uganda
- Coordinates: 00°55′30″N 33°56′42″E
- Country: Uganda
- Region: Eastern Uganda
- District: Butaleja District
- Elevation: 3,600 ft (1,100 m)

Population (2020 Estimates)
  - Total: 24,000

Butaleja is a town in Eastern Region of Uganda. It is the district headquarters and the main municipal, administrative and commercial center of Butaleja District. The district is named after the town.

== Location ==
Butaleja is located approximately 42.5 kilometres (26 mi) southwest of Mbale, the largest city in Uganda's Eastern Region. It is approximately 48 kilometres (30 mi) northwest of Tororo, in Tororo District, the nearest large town.

Butaleja is located about 254 kilometres (158 mi) northeast of Kampala, the capital and largest city of Uganda. The coordinates of the town are:0°55'30.0"N, 33°56'42.0"E (Latitude:0.9250; Longitude:33.9450). Butaleja Town Council sits at an average elevation of 1,100 metres (3,600 ft) above mean sea level.

== Population ==
In 2010, the Uganda Bureau of Statistics (UBOS), estimates the town's population at 5,500. In 2011, UBOS estimated the mid-year population of the town at 5,700. In 2014, the national population census put the population of Butaleja at 19,561.

In 2015, UBOS estimated the population of Butaleja Town Council at 20,200. In 2020, the population agency estimated the mid-year population of the town at 24,000. Of these, 12,000 (50 percent) were females and another 12,000 (50 percent) were males. UBOS calculated the population growth rate of Butaleja Town to average 3.51 percent, annually, between 2015 and 2020.

== Points of interest ==
The following points of interest lie within town:

1. The headquarters of Butaleja District Administration

2. Butaleja Central Market

3. A mobile branch of PostBank Uganda

4. The offices of Butaleja Town Council

== See also ==
- Lugwere
- Butaleja District
- List of cities and towns in Uganda
