= Butaleja District =

- District
- District location in Uganda
- Coordinates: 00°56′N 33°57′E
- Country: Uganda
- Region: Eastern Uganda
- Established: 1 July 2005
- Capital: Butaleja

Area
  - Land: 653.1 km^{2} (252.2 sq mi)

Population (2012 Estimate)
  - Total: 221,100
  - Density: 338.5/km^{2} (877/sq mi)
- Time zone: UTC+3 (EAT)
- Website: www.butaleja.go.ug

Butaleja District is a district in Eastern Uganda. It is named after its main town, Butaleja, where the district headquarters are located.

== Location ==
Butaleja District is bordered by Budaka District to the north, Mbale District to the east, Tororo District to the southeast, Bugiri District to the south and Namutumba District to the west. The district headquarters at Butaleja are located approximately 38 kilometres (24 mi) southwest of Mbale, the nearest large city. The coordinates of the district are:00 56N, 33 57E.

Butaleja is found in Bukedi region and it has two counties which include Bunyole west and Bunyole East County. and the counties are also further subdivided into sub-counties.Bunyole west county has seven sub-counties which include: Budumba, Busaba, Busaba town council, Busabi, Busolwe, Busolwe town council, and Nawanjofu. Bunyole east county also has eight sub-counties which include: Bufujja kachonga town council, Butaleja, Butaleja town council, Himutu, Kachonga, Mazimasa, Nabiganda town council, and lastly is Naweyo..

== Overview ==
Butaleja District was created by an Act of the Ugandan Parliament, and became operational on 1 July 2005. Prior to that the district was known as Bunyole County and was part of Tororo District. The predominant ethnicity in the district (85%) are Banyole, a Bantu tribe whose language is called Lunyole. Lunyole has been listed by the Institute of Languages of Makerere University among the endangered minority languages in Uganda. The main food of the Banyole is a finger millet meal called Obusiima. The traditional official meal included Obusiima and mushroom sauce.

Other ethnicities in the district (15%) include the Jopadhola, the Bagisu, the Basoga, the Iteso, the Karimojong and the Bagwere. Due to a high population density in the district, environmental degradation is a concern.

There are two municipalities in the district; Butaleja, where the district headquarters are located and Busolwe, the location of Busolwe General Hospital, a 100-bed public hospital, administered by the Uganda Ministry of Health.

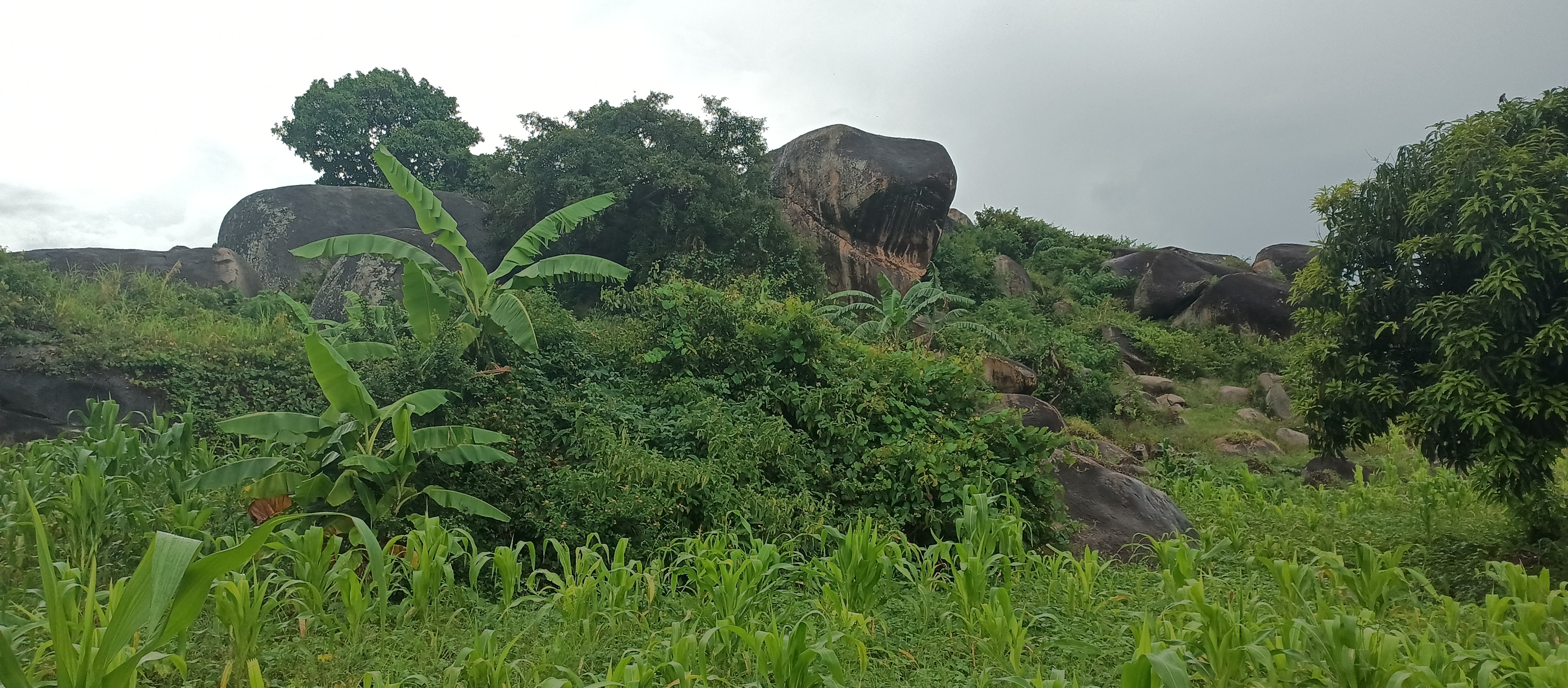
The He Cave at Dube rock - Kachoga in Butaleja

== Population ==
In 1991, the national population census estimated the district population at about 106,700. The national census in 2002 estimated the population of the district at about 157,500. The annual population growth rate in the district was 3.5%. In 2012, the population of Butaleja District was approximately 221,100.

The table below illustrates the growth trajectory of the district population between 2002 and 2012. All numbers are estimates.

Butaleja District Population Trends

Year	Est. Pop.
2002	157,500
2003	163,000
2004	168,700
2005	174,600

Year	Est. Pop.
2006	180,700
2007	187,000
2008	193,500
2009	200,300

Year	Est. Pop.
2010	207,300
2011	214,600

== Economic activities ==
Like in most of Uganda's districts, subsistence agriculture is the backbone of the district economy. Crops grown include:

- Millet
- Maize
- Sweet potatoes
- Beans
- Bananas
- Matooke
- Rice
- Cotton
- Groundnuts
- Cassava
- Sorghum
- construction
- Fishing
- Crop processing
- Metal repair and Fabrication
- Printing Service
- Bookshop business
- Boda boda Business
- Crop marketing
- Grain milling
- Carpentry
- Retail sale
- Leisure industry

Livestock kept by the population include:

- Cattle
- Goats
- Sheep
- Rabbits
- Pigs
- Chicken
- Turkeys
- Ducks
- Pigeons
- Guinea Fowl

== See also ==
- Butaleja
- Eastern Region, Uganda
- Districts of Uganda
- Busolwe General Hospital
- Doho Rice Scheme
- Parliament of Uganda
