= Busolwe =

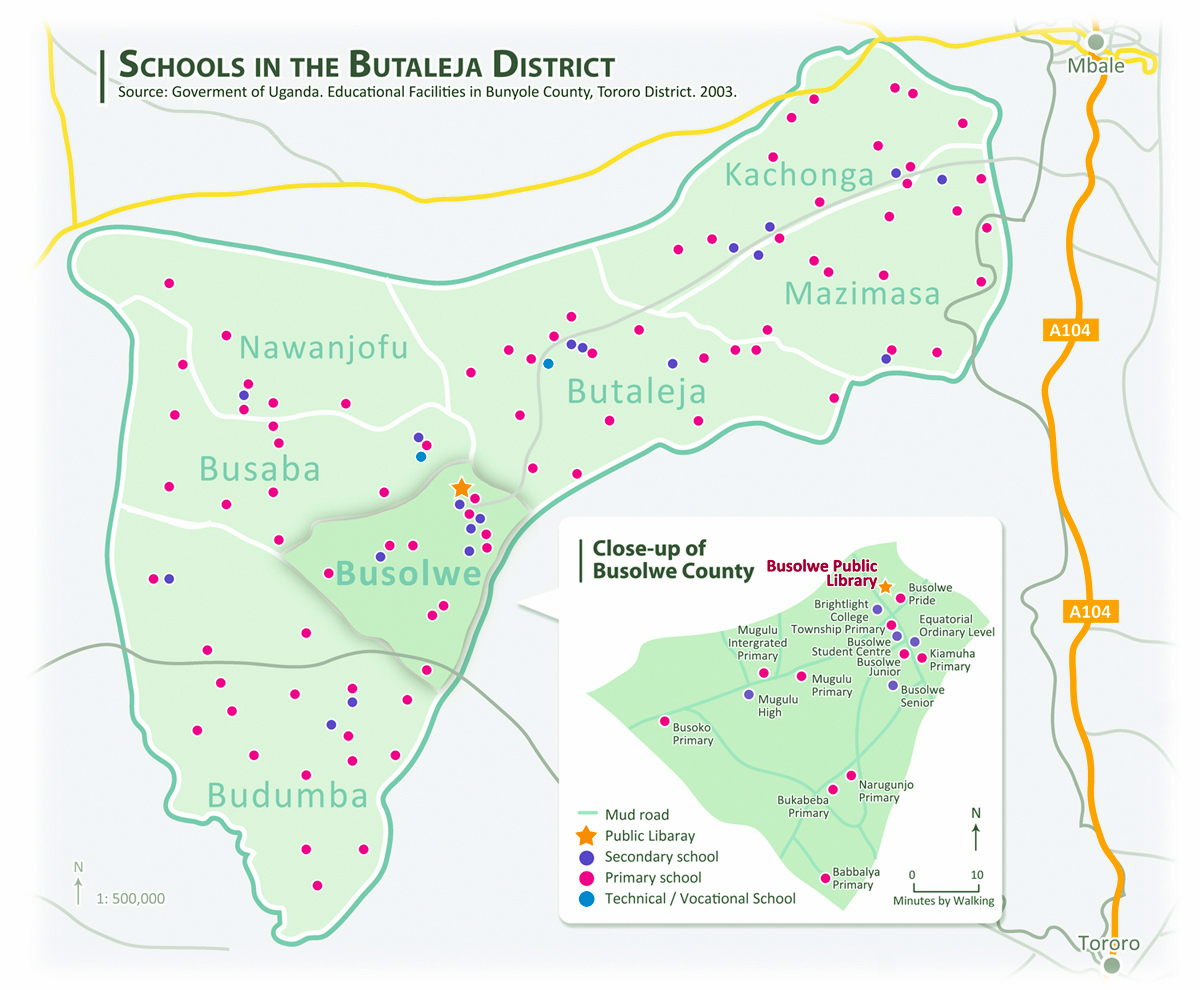
- Shows public libraries and schools

- Location in Uganda
- Coordinates: 00°50′57″N 33°55′37″E
- Country: Uganda
- Region: Eastern Uganda
- District: Butaleja District
- Elevation: 3,600 ft (1,100 m)

Population (2020 Estimates)
  - Total: 16,800

Busolwe is a town in the Eastern Region of Uganda. It is one of the two municipalities in Butaleja District, the other being Butaleja.

== Location ==
Busolwe is approximately 10 kilometres (6 mi), by road, southwest of Butaleja, the location of the district headquarters. This is about 49 kilometres (30 mi), by road, southwest of Mbale, the largest city in the Eastern Region of Uganda.

Busolwe is located approximately 236 kilometres (147 mi) northeast of Kampala, Uganda's capital city. The geographical coordinates of the town are 0°50'57.0"N, 33°55'37.0"E (Latitude:0.849167; Longitude:33.926944). Busolwe Town Council sits at an average elevation of 1,100 metres (3,600 ft) above mean sea level.

Busolwe is found in bunyole west county and it has almost four (4) parish which include:

- Busolwe central ward
- Busolwe ward
- Nakwiga ward
- Nawasu ward

== Population ==
The 2002 national census recorded the population of Busolwe at 6276. In 2010, the Uganda Bureau of Statistics (UBOS) estimated the town's population at 8,300. In 2011, UBOS estimated the mid-year population at 8,500. In 2014, the national population census put the population at 13,640.

In 2015, UBOS estimated the population of Busolwe at 14,100 people. In 2020, the population agency estimated the mid-year population of the town at 16,800 inhabitants. Of these, 8,700 (51.8 percent) were females and 8,100 (48.2 percent) were males. UBOS calculated the population growth rate of Busolwe Municipality to average 3.56 percent annually between 2015 and 2020.

== Points of interest ==
The following points of interest are found in Busolwe or near its borders:

1. Busolwe General Hospital, a 100-bed public hospital administered by the Uganda Ministry of Health

2. Busolwe Central Market

3. The offices of Busolwe Town Council

4. Busolwe Public Library

5. Lunyole Language Association Headquarters.

== Economy ==
According to the population of this region below are some of their food crops they grow as listed below:

- Maize
- Rice
- Cassava
- Beans
- Bananas
- Trade and commerce
- Millet
- Sorghum

== Livestock ==
some of the livestock kept by the population in Busolwe include:

- Cattle
- Goat
- Sheep
- pig
- chicken
- Turkey
- Duck
- Pigeib

== See also ==
- Hospitals in Uganda
- List of cities and towns in Uganda
- Busolwe Public Library
- Busolwe General Hospital
- Bunyole
- Butaleja District
