= Mumias Constituency =

Mumias Constituency was an electoral constituency in Kenya. It was one of four constituencies in the former Butere/Mumias District. The constituency was established for the 1966 elections. It was later divided into Mumias West Constituency and Mumias East Constituency and Matungu Constituency part of Kakamega County.

== Members of Parliament ==
Elections	MP	Party	Notes
1966	Abraham Owori Mulama	KANU	
1969	J. O'Washika	KANU	One-party system
1972	Francis M. N. Obongita	KANU	By-election. One-party system
1974	Francis M. N. Obongita	KANU	One-party system
1979	Elon Willis Wameyo	KANU	One-party system
1983	Elon Willis Wameyo	KANU	One-party system.
1988	Elon Willis Wameyo	KANU	One-party system.
1992	Elon Willis Wameyo	KANU	
1997	Wycliffe Wilson Osundwa	KANU	
2002	Wycliffe Wilson Osundwa	NARC	
2007	Benjamin Jomo Washiali	ODM	

2013 || Washiali, Benjamin Jomo || ODM ||

== Wards ==
Wards
Ward	Registered Voters	Local Authority
Ekero	3,016	Mumias municipality
Eluche	4,469	Mumias municipality
Lureko	1,392	Mumias municipality
Lusheya	4,650	Mumias municipality
Matawa	2,458	Mumias municipality
Mumias Central	7,244	Mumias municipality
Mumias North	4,869	Mumias municipality
Etenje	8,655	Butere/Mumias County Council
Mukulu	7,760	Butere/Mumias County Council
Musanda	10,289	Butere/Mumias County Council
Shibinga	9,210	
Total	64,012	
*September 2005.
