= Peter Kalerwa Salasya =

Kenyan politician (born 1989)

The Honourable Peter Salasya
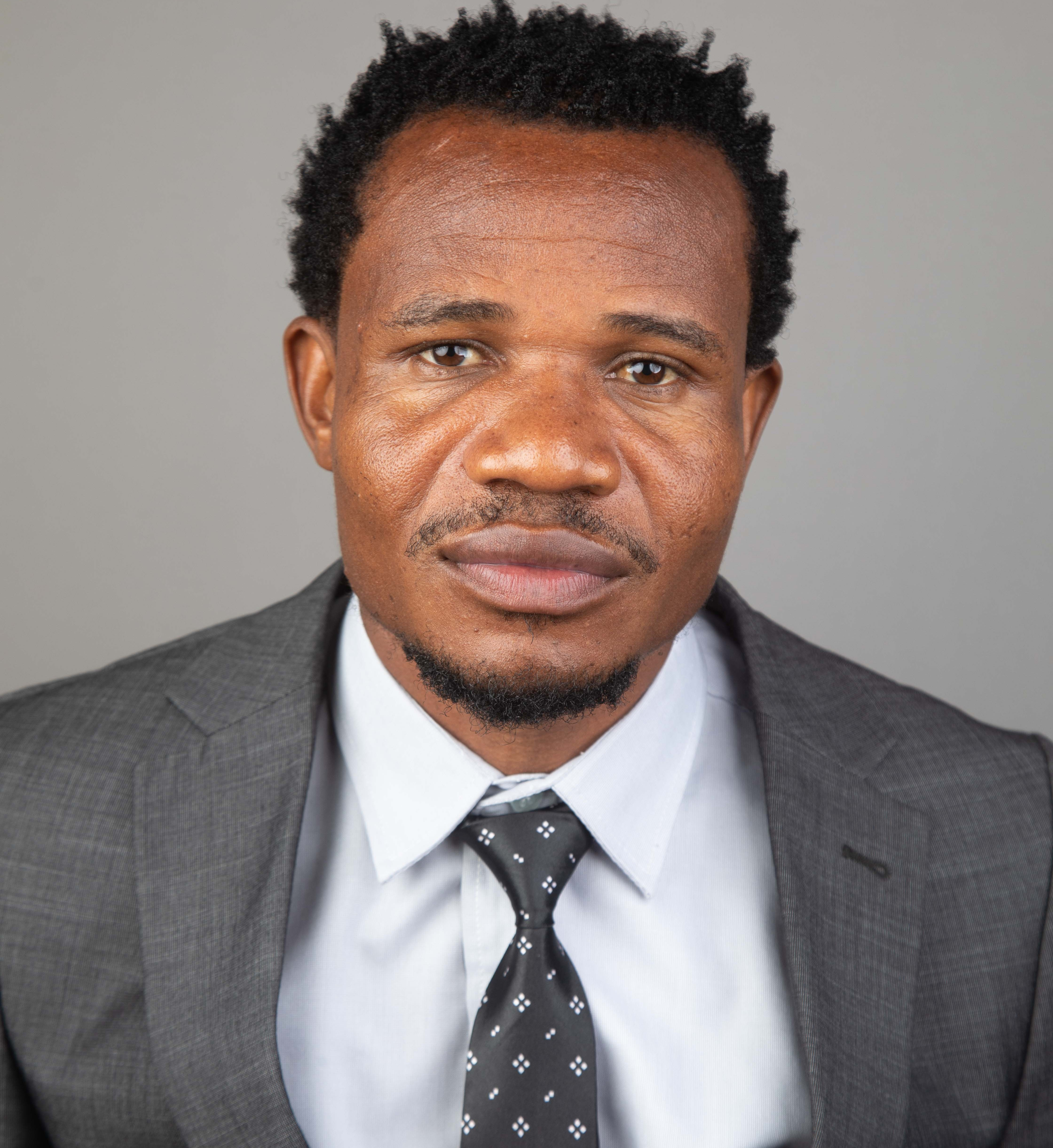

Member of Parliament for Mumias East Constituency
- Incumbent
- Assumed office 8 September 2022
- Preceded by: Benjamin Jomo Washiali
- Constituency: Mumias East

Personal details
- Born: Peter Kalerwa Salasya; 15 January 1989 (age 37) Kakamega, Kenya
- Citizenship: Kenya
- Party: Democratic Action Party - Kenya
- Education: Egerton University, Bachelor of Commerce, Banking and Finance
- Occupation: Politician
- Profession: Banker; tutor
- Nickname: PK

Peter Kalerwa Salasya (born 15 January 1989), also known as PK, is a Kenyan politician and current member of parliament for Mumias East Constituency. He was elected in the 2022 Kenyan general election on the Democratic Action Party–Kenya (DAP-K) ticket. Prior to entering politics, he worked in the banking sector and as a tutor. Salasya is known for his grassroots campaigns, his focus on reviving the Mumias Sugar Company and for controversies related to assault and hate speech charges.

== Early life and education ==
Salasya was born on 15 January 1989 in Kakamega County as the second-last born in a family of seven children. He attended Shanderema Primary School in Kakamega (1997 to 2005) then he joined Lubinu Boys High School in 2006. He lost his father, John Salasya, in his second year of high school.

In 2011, he joined Egerton University in Nakuru County for a bachelor's degree in commerce, banking and finance, graduating in 2014. This is where he became involved in university politics, from his first year, when he was unsuccessful in his bid for the position of Director of Academics and in his third year, he vied for the position of vice chairperson.

== Career ==
After finishing his degree at university, he went back to his home county, Kakamega, where he was employed (2014 to 2015) as a salesperson at Bufalo Bicycle. He was a tutor at Sigalagala National Polytechnic (2015 to 2016), before being employed at Diamond Trust Bank as an operations officer and as a cashier before resigning to pursue a career in politics.

=== Political career ===
In 2017, Salasya first contested for the Mumias East Member of Parliament, finishing seventh in a field of nine candidates with 270 votes. During the campaign, he used a handcart pushed by supporters for transportation.

He was successfully elected in the 2022 Kenyan general election as the DAP-K candidate with 54.82% of the vote. His campaign focused on the revival of the Mumias Sugar Company and was noted for its door-to-door strategy and support from then-cabinet secretary Eugene Wamalwa.

== Legal issues ==
=== Assault ===
On 12 January 2024, a video showed Salasya physically assaulting the Member of County Assembly, Peter Walunya Indimuli, during a funeral service in Mumias East, Kakamega County. According to reports, the altercation started when Indimuli requested Salasya to respect the family in his remarks. Salasya was arrested in Mumias on charges of assault and causing grievous bodily harm. He denied the charges, and he was released on bond but later missed court for his mention, citing he was sick and admitted to Aga Khan Hospital. The Ethics and Anti-Corruption Commission summoned the MP over the assault to record a statement on the incident.

=== Hate speech ===
Salasya was arrested and charged before a Nairobi court with hate speech. He was accused of inciting ethnic tension between the Luo and Luhya communities by a post he made on X (formerly Twitter) on 10 May 2025. He was charged with an offense contrary to section 12(1)(b) and section 13(2) of the National Cohesion and Integration (NCIC) Act of 2008 and released on bail. In June 2025, he requested that the matter be settled out of court. As of September 2025, the case was still pending, with the Director of Public Prosecutions granted time to review the application before the next scheduled hearing in October 2025. In October, the magistrate forwarded the file to NCIC for assessment and recommendations after the prosecution said the commission needed time to evaluate the case.

On 11 November 2025, the magistrate directed that the case proceed to a full hearing after efforts to resolve the matter through the NCIC stalled due to the expiry of the commissioners' term. The case was scheduled for hearing on 17 January 2026, when the prosecution informed the court that the parties had reached an agreement to settle the matter through the commission's conciliation mechanism. The magistrate declined to allow the withdrawal of the case, citing non-compliance with key conditions of the agreement. The court ordered that the matter be mentioned on 2 February 2026, to consider adoption of the agreement after verifying compliance. As part of the proposed settlement, Salasya was required to run a social media campaign advocating for peace.
