= Reuben Sechele Nyangweso =

Kenyan politician

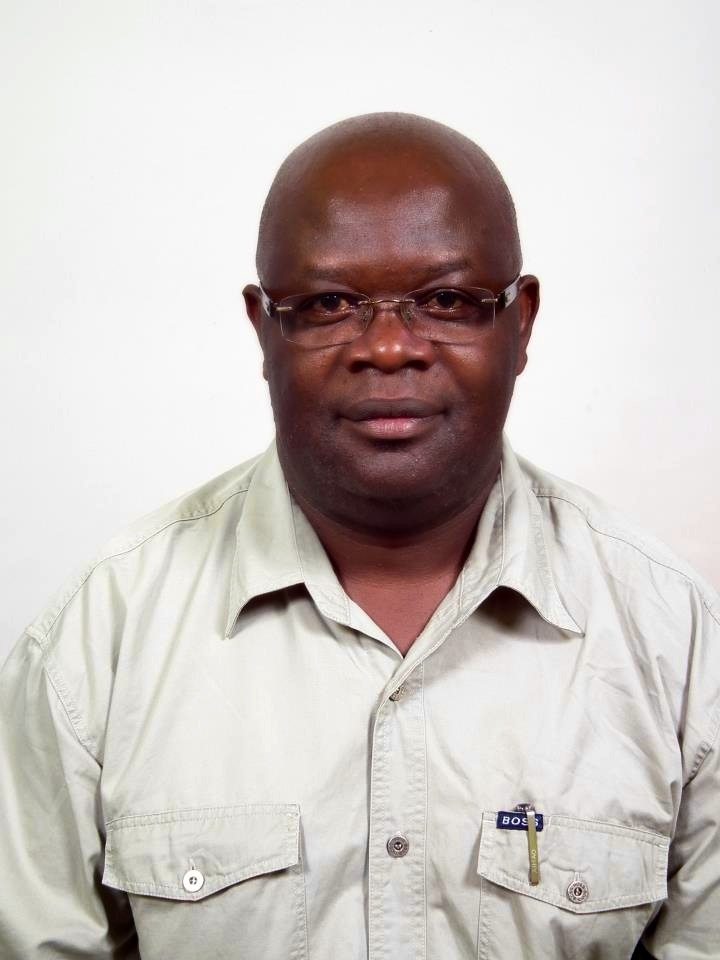
- Born: 1961 (age 64–65); Mwiyenga, Kakamega, Kenya
- Occupations: Politician, Businessman, Former Majority Leader, Former Chair Public Service & County Administration Committee Kakamega County Assemble
- Spouse: Phoebe Nyangweso (1986 - present)
- Parent(s): Fredrick Nyangweso Obiero (1931 -2006); Jenifer Okeno Nyangweso (1933 - 1998)

Reuben Sechele Nyangweso (born 1961) is a Kenyan politician who was a member of Kakamega County Assembly in Kenya representing Butsotso South. He was the first Leader of majority in the Assembly until 2014. He now holds the office of Chairman of Chairman of the County Public Service Board. He is the vice chair of the Liaison committee and a member of the labor committee Kakamega County Assembly he was elected to the County Assembly under the CORD coalition through the Orange Democratic Movement where he has been the deputy chair for Lurambi since 2008 In the capacity as first leader of majority, Reuben presented the first ever County budget for approval by the Assembly.

== Family life ==
Reuben Sechele Nyangweso was born in 1960 at Mwiyenga village in Kakamega, fifth born of ten siblings in the family of Mr Fredrick Nyangweso Obiero (1931–2006) and Mrs Jeniffer Okeno Nyangweso (1933–1998). He is from the Abashibo sub-clan of the Butsotso of the Luhya people who make 14% of the total population of Kenya. He is married to Phoebe Nyangweso and they have four children- two daughters and two sons.

== Career ==
Reuben graduated from the Medical Training Center Nairobi with a Diploma in pharmaceutical technology (1982). Reuben worked for the Kenya Ministry of Health then went to work for Central Bank of Kenya before branching into business. He is a director of Holfar Products and a partner in a publishing company in Nairobi. He has worked with the Read for the Top project run by Canadian NGO Tembo Kenya, donating and providing reading books for the schools in Kakamega County. He spent several years in Canada and he spend some time at Carleton University studying political science (1999). His years in Canada gave him an opportunity to experience western work culture by working for two years as a Pharmaceutical Technologist in Loblaw Companies He is currently pursuing a bachelor's degree in community health and development at the Jomo Kenyatta University of Agriculture and Technology.

== Academics ==
Reuben holds a B.Sc. (Community Health & Development) from Jomo Kenyatta University of Agriculture and Technology, a DipPharm (KMTC-Nrb) and a CPhT from the Ontario College of Pharmacists, 2002. He studied political science at Carleton University] in Ottawa, Canada.

== Politics ==
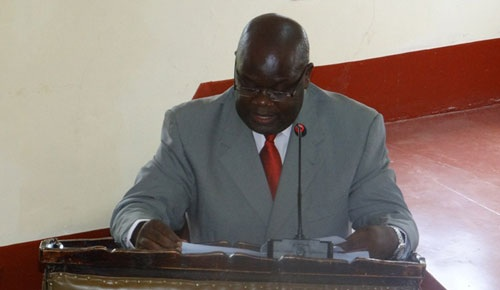
The vetting committee

Nyangweso first tried his hand in elective politics in 1997 when he ran a very successful campaign against the KANU establishment candidate and won the nomination but was narrowly beaten by the opposition candidate for the Lurambi constituency seat. It was whispered that the KANU establishment decided to lose the seat rather than have someone within the party whom they could not control. He tried again for that seat and was unsuccessful. Reuben was very active in the constitutional referendum and after the establishment of the counties he rightfully realized that the responsibilities of the county governments would require enlighten leadership. He thus opted to run for county representative and was elected to the Kakamega County Assembly. He served as the leader of the majority in the Kakamega County Assembly in the first session of the County assembly. In 2014, he was elected to the Chair of the Kakamega County Public Service & County Administration Committee as well as Vice Chair of Liaison Committee between the Legislative and Executive. Kakamega County is one of the largest counties in Kenya by population and resources; the county government is expected to convert people's expectations into tangible results, Reuben plans to play a key role in that transformation.

== Leadership ==
On 8 May 2013 Reuben led other County representatives in Kakamega in a coordinated walkout to assert their right to the constitutionally mandated pay and other compensation which the National government wanted to reduce, obstinately to reduce cost but overtly to test the will of the counties to protect their turf. In early 2013 police investigated an incident in which Nyangweso allegedly threatened a Kenya Power worker with a pistol. This allegation was found without merit, and the police apologized to Mr. Nyangweso. Mr. Nyangweso runs a pharmacy and other businesses in Kakamega town besides serving the county as their elected representative.
