= Kholera =

- Ward
- Location within Kenya
- Coordinates: 0.42°N 34.47°E
- Country: Kenya
- Province: Western Province
- County: Kakamega
- Constituency: Matungu

Area
  - Land: 61.9 km^{2} (23.9 sq mi)
- Elevation: 1,289 m (4,228 ft)

Population (2015)
  - Total: 28,821
  - Density: 466/km^{2} (1,210/sq mi)
- Time zone: UTC+3 (EAT)

Kholera is the second largest of the 5 wards in Matungu Constituency of Kakamega County in Kenya's Western Province.
