= Butere/Mumias District =

Administrative district in the Western Province of Kenya

Coordinates: 0.333333°N 34.4833°E

Butere/Mumias District was an administrative district in the Western Province of Kenya. Its capital town was Butere. The district had a population of 476,928 (1999 census) and an area of 939 km^{2}. In 2010, the district was eliminated and incorporated into Kakamega County.

Local authorities (councils)
Authority	Type	Population*	Urban pop.*
Mumias	Municipality	91,592	36,158
Butere-Mumias	County	385,336	9,761
Total	-	476,928	45,919
* 1999 census. Source:

Administrative divisions
Division	Population*	Urban pop.*	Headquarters
Butere	111,637	8,636	Butere
Khwisero (Kwisero)	88,234	0	
Matungu	108,314	414	Matungu
Mumias	168,743	32,965	Mumias
Total	476,928	42,015	-
* 1999 census. Sources: , ,

The district has four constituencies:

- Butere Constituency
- Khwisero Constituency
- Matungu Constituency
- Mumias Constituency
