= Nabongo Cultural Centre and shrine =

Nabongo Cultural Centre and Shrine in Western Kenya

Nabongo Cultural Centre and Shrine
- Eshiembekho (Luyia)
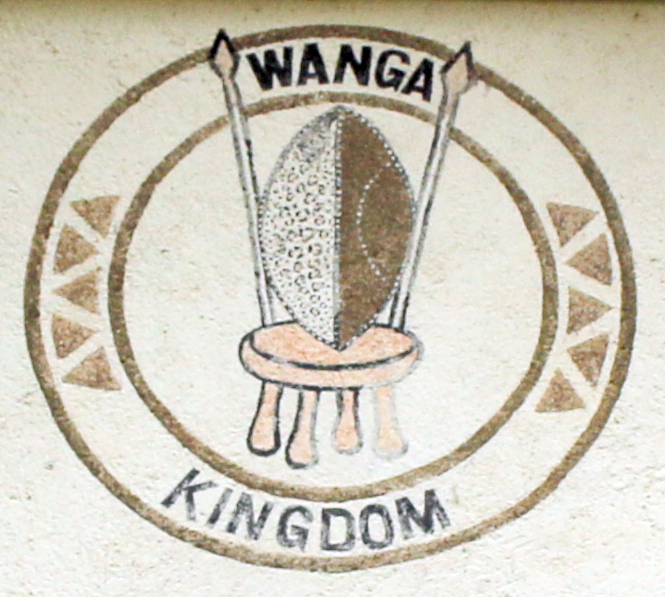
- Coat of arms featured on the Nabongo Cultural Centre and Shrine museum
- Type: Mausoleum, cultural centre and shrine
- Location: Western Province, Kenya

History
- Built: 2008

Site notes
- Governing body: Nabongo Council of Elders

The Nabongo Cultural Centre and Shrine is a shrine and cultural centre dedicated to the Wanga Kingdom of the Luhya people in Kenya. The shrine contains the tombs of Wanga kings or Nabongo are buried, including the founder of Mumias, Nabongo Mumia. Locally known as Eshiembekho, the shrine is managed by the Luhya Council of Elders.

The centre was officially opened on 13 December 2008 by reigning Nabongo, Peter Shitawa Mumia II and former prime minister of Kenya, Raila Odinga. The site contains various structures on the 12-acres of land: a royal mausoleum, cultural centre, museum, library, bar and restaurant.

== Mausoleum ==
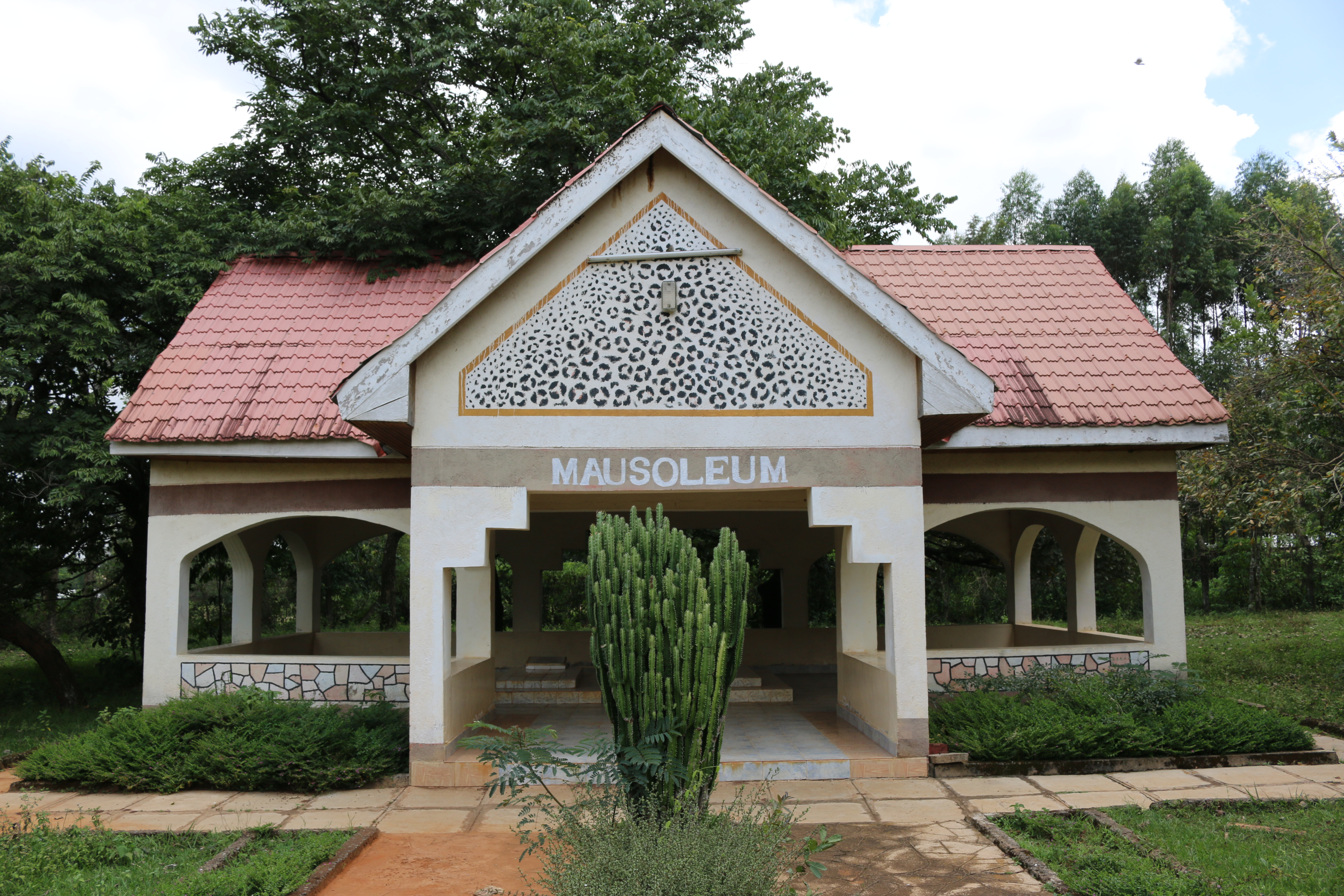
Mausoleum at the Nabongo Cultural Centre and Shrine

The Mausoleum holds the tombs of past Wanga kings: Nabongo Wamukoya, Nabongo Shiundu, Nabongo Shitawa and Nabongo Mumia. The grave of Nabongo Wanga, the first leader and founding father of the Wanga kingdom, is separated from the four on a nearby burial mound dating back to the 12th century.

== Cultural centre ==
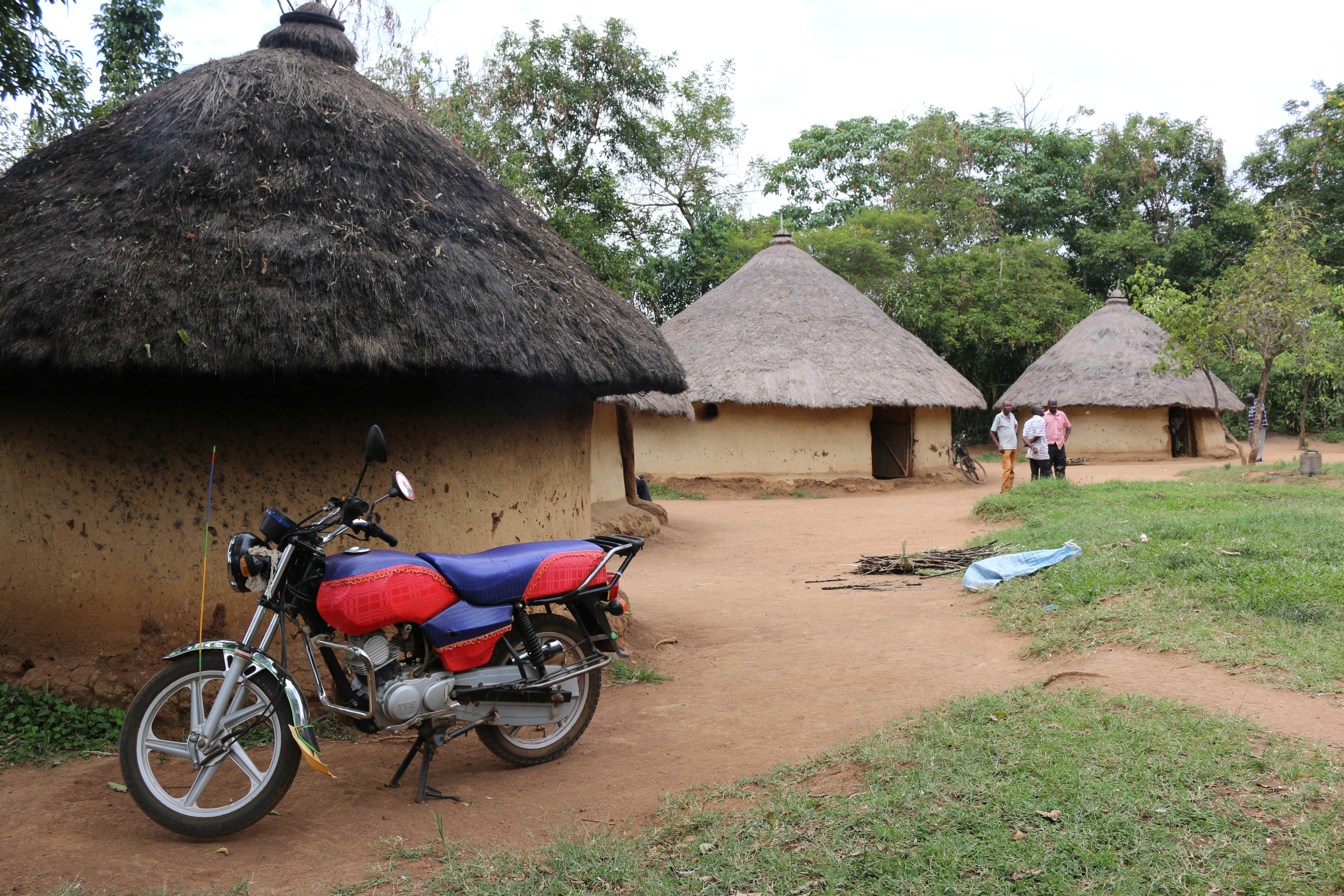
Traditional Luhya homestead at the Nabongo Cultural Centre and Shrine

The site contains a traditional Luhya homestead utilised as a cultural and community hub. Here, traditional customs are carried out including the production of busaa, a local fermented drink.

== Library and Museum ==
A modern building stands next to the mausoleum with a library and a museum displaying Wanga traditional artifacts including Nabongo Mumia's royal regalia, weapons and traditional farming equipment. The museum also holds the first Kenyan flag flown by Joseph Thomson in 1883.

== See also ==
- Luhya people
- Luhya languages
- Mumias
- Wanga Kingdom
- Wanga
