= Buchinga =

Town in Kenya

Coordinates: 0°17′N 34°40′E

Buchinga, also known as Ebuchinga, is a small town in the Western Province of Kenya.

It is located approximately 15 kilometres (9.3 mi) west of Kakamega and 20 kilometres (12 mi) east of Mumias lLatitude: 0.28 / longitude: 34.65). It has a primary and a secondary school. Buchinga was established near the intersection of the road to Kakamega and the road to Bukura. Its residents are primarily of the Olutsotso Luhya ethnic group. Buchinga is the site of a vibrant market, Shibuli, which offers good prices on sugarcane. Ebuchinga usually hosts the annual Butsotso Central games (mostly football and legball), with the finals being played on Boxing Day afternoon. Buchinga is also well known for early bull fighting scenes on boxing day.
