= Tindi Mwale =

Kenyan politician and aeronautical engineer

Hon. Tindi Mwale CBS
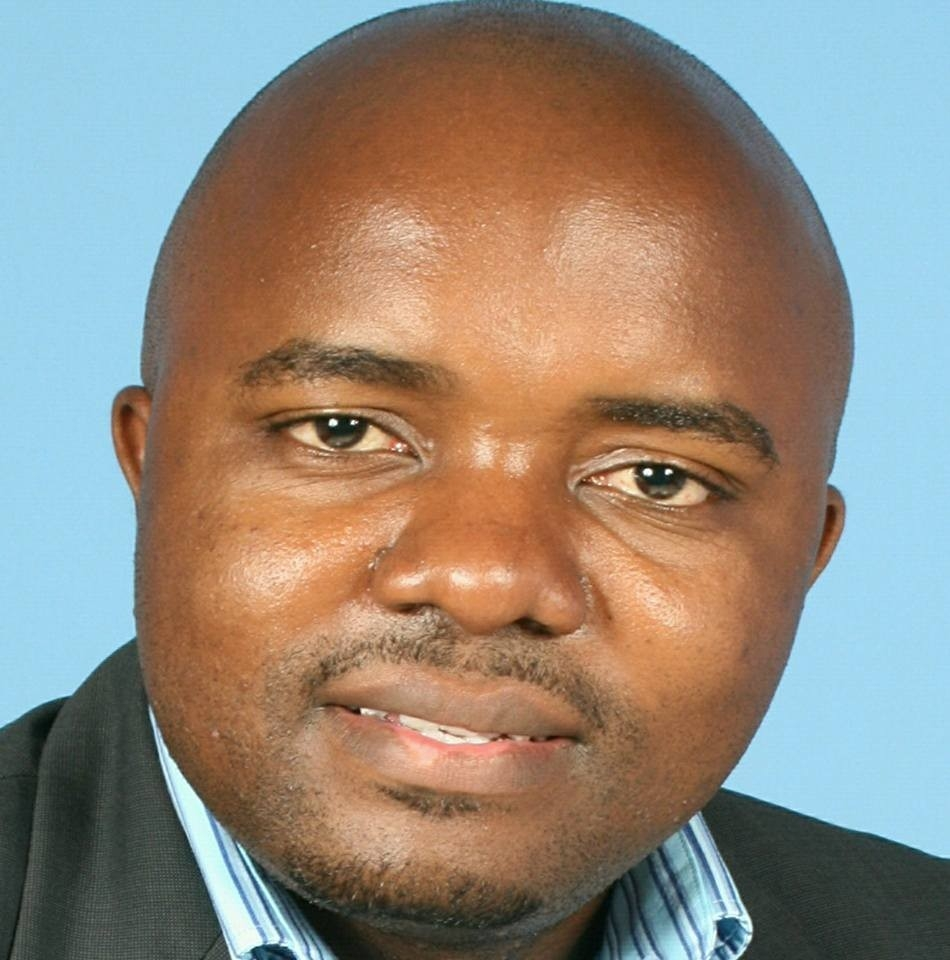
- Mwale in 2016

Chairperson of the Public Accounts Committee
- Incumbent
- Assumed office March 2025
- Preceded by: John Mbadi

Member of the National Assembly of Kenya
- Incumbent
- Assumed office August 2017
- Preceded by: Andrew Toboso
- Constituency: Butere Constituency

Secretary-General of the AFROPAC
- Incumbent
- Assumed office March 2025

Personal details
- Born: November 4, 1986 (age 39) Mumare Village, Lunza, Butere, Kakamega County, Kenya
- Party: Orange Democratic Movement (ODM)
- Other political affiliations: Amani National Congress (2017–2022); Democratic Action Party (Kenya) (2022)
- Spouse: Mourine Ntinyari Tindi Mwale
- Children: 4
- Education: Nairobi Technical Training College; Kenya Methodist University
- Occupation: Politician; Entrepreneur; Aeronautical engineer
- Awards: Chief of the Order of the Burning Spear (CBS) (2025)

Tindi Mwale (born 4 November 1986) is a Kenyan politician, entrepreneur and aeronautical engineer who has served as the Member of the National Assembly of Kenya for Butere Constituency from 2017. He is a member of the Orange Democratic Movement in the 13th Parliament of Kenya. In March 2025, he was elected Chairperson of the Public Accounts Committee (Kenya), responsible for examining government expenditure and audit reports. He also serves as Secretary-General of the African Organization for Public Accounts Committees (AFROPAC). Mwale previously worked in aeronautical engineering before transitioning into politics.

== Early life and education ==
Tindi Mwale was born on 4 November 1986 in Mumare Village, Lunza, Butere Sub-County, Kakamega County. According to the Kenya Times, he is the youngest child of Abel Mwale (Major Mwale), a former army officer, and Decima Omusura Mwale. He belongs to the Marama tribe, a sub-group of the Luhya people.

Mwale attended Muluwa Primary School, Serve Academy in Sabatia, and Musingu High School in Kakamega. Between 2008 and 2010, he worked briefly as an aeronautical engineer at Mission Aviation Fellowship based at Wilson Airport, Nairobi. He later earned a diploma in Aeronautical Engineering from the Nairobi Technical Training College and pursued a degree in Business Administration at Kenya Methodist University.

He is married to Mourine Ntinyari Tindi Mwale, and the couple has four children. Mwale is a member of the Anglican Church of Kenya.

== Political career ==
=== Entry into politics ===
Mwale first contested the Butere Constituency parliamentary seat in the 2017 Kenyan general election under the Amani National Congress (ANC) party and was elected to the National Assembly.

=== Political affiliations ===
After serving under ANC from 2017 to 2022, Mwale defected to the Democratic Action Party (Kenya) (DAP-K), and later joined the Orange Democratic Movement (ODM) in 2022, through which he was re-elected. His political transitions reflected Kenya's shifting party coalitions following the 2022 general elections.

=== Parliamentary leadership ===
Mwale has held several leadership positions in Parliament. Between November 2022 and March 2025, he served as Vice Chairperson of the Public Accounts Committee (PAC), later assuming the role of Acting Chairperson from June 2024 to March 2025. In March 2025, he was formally elected as the PAC Chairperson, succeeding John Mbadi. The committee is mandated to oversee national audit reports and public expenditure. Mwale also serves as the Secretary-General of the African Organization for Public Accounts Committees (AFROPAC), a regional body that promotes legislative oversight and fiscal accountability across African parliaments.

=== Legislative positions ===
Mwale voted against the Kenya Finance Bill 2024, aligning with MPs who opposed new tax proposals that triggered nationwide demonstrations. He has supported motions addressing salary deductions for civil servants and advocated for improvements in public education facilities within Butere Constituency.

== Honours ==
In 2025, Mwale was among MPs nominated by President William Ruto to receive the Chief of the Order of the Burning Spear (CBS), one of Kenya's highest state honours. The recognition was part of the annual Presidential Honours List acknowledging contributions to public service.

== Mention in the Pandora Papers ==
In 2021, the International Consortium of Investigative Journalists (ICIJ) published the Pandora Papers investigation, which cited several African politicians with offshore links. Mwale was mentioned in connection with the 2018 registration of a company in Mauritius through a Dubai-based firm, SFM Corporate Services. He told investigators that the company was intended for legitimate engineering and infrastructure projects and denied owning any offshore accounts.
