= Nabongo Musui =

Nabongo Musui (also Musuwi) was one of the sons of Nabongo Wabala. Musuwi was possibly born in the 12th century in Matungu where the Wanga Kingdom's capital (Itookho) was located. There is not much information about his childhood. What is well known about Nabongo Musui is that when his grandfather, Wanga was about to die, he appointed Musui's father, Wabala as his successor over his elder brother, Murono. This caused a dispute among Wabala and Murono. Later, Wabala was assassinated in Bukhayo, so it was alleged that Murono was the one who had instigated his brother's murder. Murono therefore took power at Matungu and lasted a short period of rein as the Nabongo. Later on, Musui, Wabala's son engaged with his uncle, Murono in a battle and Musui emerged a winner. This made Murono to feel defeated and rejected. So, he decided to cross River Nzoia and established another kingdom at Indangalasia.

At Matungu, Musui took power in 1190 till his death in 1274. The table below shows a list of other kings of Wanga Kingdom:

== See also ==
- List of rulers of Wanga
