= Nabongo Wabala =

12th-century Abawanga ruler

Wabala was a Nabongo (King) who ruled the Abawanga around 1140 - 1190. His father was called Nabongo Wanga, the founding father of the famous Wanga Kingdom. It is said that Nabongo Wanga had several sons among them: Murono, Muniafu, Wabala, Namagwa and Mutende and that when his death came, there arose a succession dispute between his sons. Wanga had appointed Wabala as his successor over his elder brother, Murono. In the course of all the dispute, Wabala was assassinated in Bukhayo, and it was alleged that Murono was the one who instigated his brother's murder. Murono therefore arose to power at Matungu and enjoyed a short period of rein as the Nabongo. Later on, Wabala's son called Musui embattled Murono and Musui emerged to be the winner.

Murono felt so defeated and rejected, there, he went across River Nzoia and established another kingdom at Indangalasia.

== See also ==
- List of rulers of Wanga
