= Butere Constituency =

Electoral constituency in Kenya

Butere
- constituency for the Parliament of Kenya
- Butere Constituency within Kakamega County

- Kakamega County within Kenya
- County: Kakamega
- Population: 154,100
- Area: 210 km^{2} (81.1 sq mi)

Current constituency
- Number of members: 1
- Party: ODM
- Member of Parliament: Nicholas Scott Tindi Mwale
- Wards: 5

Butere Constituency is an electoral constituency in Kenya. It is one of twelve constituencies in Kakamega County and one of four in the former Butere/Mumias District. The constituency has six wards, all electing councillors to the Butere/Mumias County Council. The constituency was established for the 1963 elections.

== Butere Constituency Members of Parliament ==
Elections	MP	Party	Notes
1963	Joseph Martin Shikuku	KADU	
1969	Joseph Martin Shikuku	KANU	One-party system
1974	Joseph Martin Shikuku	KANU	One-party system
1975	Richard Litunya	KANU	By-election. One-party system.
1979	Joseph Martin Shikuku	KANU	One-party system
1983	Joseph Martin Shikuku	KANU	One-party system.
1988	Jesse Eshikhati Opembe	KANU	One-party system.
1989	J. A. O. Okwara	KANU	By-election. One-party system.
1992	Joseph Martin Shikuku	Ford-A	
1997	Amukowa Anangwe	KANU	
2002	Wycliffe Oparanya	NARC	
2007	Wycliffe Oparanya	ODM	
2013	Andrew Toboso	ODM	
2017	Tindi Mwale	ODM	
2022	Tindi Mwale	ODM	

== Wards in Butere Constituency ==
Wards
Ward	Registered voters
Butere township	7,039
Central Marama	6,362
Marenyo / Shianda	8,510
North Marama	7,241
Manyala and Masaba	7,261
West Marama	9,164
Total	45,577
*September 2005
