= Nanyeni =

Village in Kenya

Nanyeni is a village in Western Province, Kakamega county, Kenya, located in the west of Matungu district.
