= Ivakale =

Village in Kakamega County, Kenya

Ivakale is a village located in Kakamega County, Kenya

The village is located a few kilometres east of the A1 road between Kakamega and Malava. Ivakale is located adjacent to the northern border of Kakamega Forest. A small forest patch known as Kisere Forest is located north of Ivakale.

Administratively, Ivakale is a sub-location It is part of the Kambiri ward of Shinyalu Constituency and Kakamega County Council.

There is a primary school.
