= Shibuli =

Village in Western Province, Kenya

Coordinates: 0°17′N 34°39′E

Shibuli is a village in Western Province, Kenya, located 12 km (7.5 mi) west of Kakamega and 20 km (12 mi) east of Mumias. Shibuli has numerous shops, including Blessed Beauty Salon and Ebenezer Kiosk, and is nearby to Esokone Primary and Secondary Schools. The postal code for Shibuli is 50130.

The Water Project has two projects in Shibuli: one protecting a spring, and one for collection and storage of rainwater. Improvements have been made by the government to the 'E' level-road connecting the Shibuli with Bukura to its south.
