= Nyangweso (surname) =

Nyangweso is a surname. Notable people with the surname include:

- Benjamin Nyangweso, Kenyan football player and coach
- Denis Nyangweso (born 1978), Ugandan politician
- Frank Nyangweso (1939–2011), Ugandan boxer
- Reuben Sechele Nyangweso (born 1961), Kenyan politician
- Tony Nyangweso, Ugandan rugby player
