= Wycliffe Oparanya =

Kenyan politician

H.E Wycliffe Oparanya
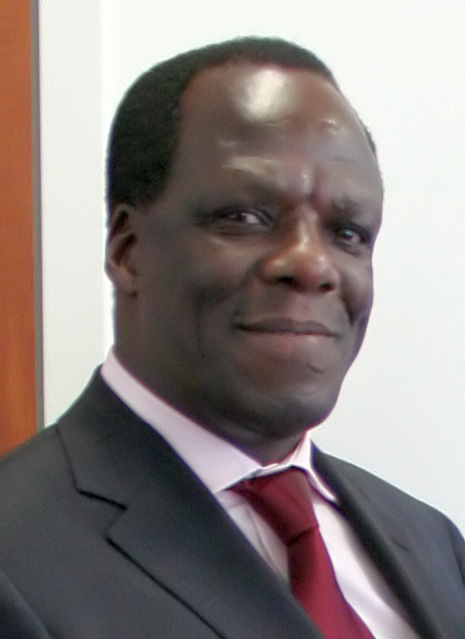

Cabinet Secretary for Cooperatives and MSMEs
- Incumbent
- Assumed office 24 July 2024
- President: William Ruto
- Preceded by: Simon Chelugui

1st Governor of Kakamega County
- In office 27 March 2013 – 15 September 2022
- Deputy: Prof Phillip Kutima
- Succeeded by: Fernandes O. Barasa

Minister of State for Planning, National Development and Vision 2030
- In office 2008–2013
- President: Mwai Kibaki
- Prime Minister: Raila Odinga

Member of the Kenyan Parliament
- In office 2002–2013
- Constituency: Butere

Personal details
- Born: Wycliffe Ambetsa Oparanya; 25 March 1956 (age 70) Butere, Kenya Colony
- Citizenship: Kenya
- Party: ODM
- Spouses: Carolyn Oparanya; Priscilla Oparanya
- Children: 3
- Education: BSc Commerce; MSc Business Administration
- Alma mater: University of Nairobi
- Occupation: Politician
- Profession: Accountant

Wycliffe Ambetsa Oparanya (born 25 March 1956) is a Kenyan politician who is the current Cabinet Secretary for Cooperatives and MSMEs. He previously served as the governor of Kakamega County from 2013 to 2022.

He was elected on 4 March 2013 and became the first governor of Kakamega County following promulgation of the Constitution of Kenya in 2010. Subsequently, in August 2017, he was reelected for his second term as governor. He is, therefore, the pioneer Governor of Kakamega County under the devolved system of governance in Kenya that established 47 counties.

He was previously Minister of State for Planning, National Development and Vision 2030 in the Kibaki Administration. He was appointed on 14 January 2019 as the Council of Governors of Kenya chairperson. Wycliffe Oparanya was also the ODM Party Deputy Party Leader.

== Personal life ==
Oparanya is married to two wives, Caroline Oparanya and Priscilla Oparanya.

=== Business ===
Oparanya has 23 years experience in local and international Finance Management, Audit and Business Consultancy.

=== Politics ===
==== Parliament ====
He belongs to the Orange Democratic Movement and represented Butere Constituency in the National Assembly of Kenya since the 2007 Kenyan parliamentary election.

==== Cabinet ====
===== Ministry of Planning =====
Oparanya was among ministers appointed by secondment of Prime Minister Raila Odinga from The Orange Democratic Movement party after the prime minister signed the National Accord Act to form a coalition government with the late President Kibaki after the disputed 2007 elections.

===== Ministry of Co operatives =====
Appointed minister for SME by President Ruto

==== =MP For Butere ====
Hon Opranya was first elected in 1992 to represent Butere constituesncy in the today kakamega County

== Controversy ==
=== Corruption allegations ===
In 2023 Oparanya was under investigation for embezzlement of Ksh.1.3 billion which occurred during his two-term tenure as Kakamega County Governor, and his assets got frozen. He denied the allegations, terming them as politically instigated. The case is still ongoing at the High Court of Kenya after it nullified its withdrawal by the Directorate of Public Prosecutions.
