= Wanga Kingdom =

Kingdom of Luhya people in Kenya

Wanga
- Traditional kingdom
- The Wanga Kingdom is located in Kakamega County, Western Province, Kenya. Kakamega County is shaded red on this map
- Sovereign state: Kenya
- Seat: Mumias

Government
  - Nabongo: Peter Mumia II
- Time zone: UTC+3 (EAT)

The Wanga Kingdom was a traditional kingdom within western Kenya, consisting of the Wanga (Abawanga) tribe of the Luhya people (Abaluyia). At its peak, the kingdom covered an expansive area from Jinja in west to Naivasha in the East African Rift. The Wanga kingdom was a significant African empire and the most organized structure of government in pre-colonial Kenya politically, economically, and militarily.

In 2016, the Wanga numbered around 700,000, mostly occupying the Kakamega County, Western Province, Kenya. The seat of power is located in Mumias. The Wanga are one of 19 tribes of the Luhya people. There are 22 clans that comprise the Wanga tribe. The Wanga retain the Nabongo, as their monarch. The Abashitse clan holds the royal lineage of the Nabongo. The current Nabongo is Peter Mumia II.

== Etymology ==
The name Wanga is eponymous, originating from the name of the kingdom's founder, Nabongo Wanga. The name Wanga refers to the people as well as their descent and geographical location.

The origin of the title Nabongo is uncertain. However, Kenyan historian Gideon Were refers to the pre-Wanga ruler, Muima as "Nabongo Muima" indicating that the title may predate the formation of the Wanga Kingdom.

== History ==
=== Precolonial history ===
==== Origins ====
The early history of the Wanga Kingdom is unclear, with various conflicting traditions as to their origins. One tradition holds that they are descendants of ancient Egyptians. Their ancestors are said to have migrated, from Egypt to Ethiopia, where they were under the leadership of Simbi and Nangwera before moving to help form the Buganda Kingdom where they were ruled by the Kabaka of Buganda for many generations before relocating to Lela in the present-day Nyanza around the 10th century.

==== Nabongo Wanga ====
The kingdom was founded in the 16th century by Nabongo Wanga, a descendant of the rulers of the Buganda Kingdom. The Nabongo Wanga initially settled in Nyanza Province before moving the capital to Mumias, Western Province.

==== Nabongo Wabala, Nabongo Murono, and Nabongo Musui ====
After the death of Wanga, there was a dispute between his sons over succession. Wabala, Wanga's appointed successor quarreled with his elder brother, Murono over succession rights. Wabala was assassinated in Bukhayo, allegedly at Murono's instigation. Murono was briefly Nabongo before Wabala's son, Musui defeated him in battle. Following his defeat, Murono crossed Nzoia River and established a separate centre near present-day Matungu around 1679–1706.

==== Nabongo Netya ====
Nabongo Netya reigned over the Wanga Kingdom c.1760-1787. During this time there were several clans in the Wanga kingdom. They included Murono's clan on the right bank of River Nzoia, Abamuima's clan at Imanga (Between modern day Mumias and Butere) another at Matungu and Netya's in Elureko (modern day Mumias). Netya attempted to bring all these centers under his control with varying degrees of success.

During the reign of Nabongo Netya, land disputes lead to conflict between the Wanga and their neighbors like the Teso, Bukusu, Jougenya. Nabongo Netya is said to have struck an accord with the Uasin Gishu trading cattle and grazing land in exchange for Maasai military assistance. The death of Netya, c.1787 ushered in a period of increased external conflicts with the Maasai.

==== Nabongo Osundwa ====
Nabongo Osundwa made peace with the Maasai and consolidated power in Mumias making it the administrative centre of Wanga while Matungu became the Nabongo's primary residence. Following the death of Nabongo Osundwa, a succession dispute arose between Osundwa's sons, Kweyu and Wamukoya, around 1814.

==== Nabongo Wamukoya ====
It is claimed that Osundwa's choice of Kweyu as a successor was actively contested by elders because they did not like him. They therefore enthroned Wamukoya in Kweyu's absence, a decision which Kweyu rejected and seceded to Eshimuli with his followers. Here, Kweyu established another center for his new Wanga Mukulu confederacy (upper Wanga).

==== Nabongo Shiundu ====
Nabongo Shiundu inherited leadership from his father Nabongo Wamukoya in the 1850s and these are the years in which the Arab-Swahili traders arrived in Buluyia land. At the same, the situation was no better at Eshimuli where Kweyu had paved way for his son, Nabongo Sakwa to rule. Here, Nabongo Sakwa's main enemies included the Abanyala, and Ababukusu with whom the Wanga occasionally clashed over grazing land. Earlier during the reign of Kweyu, Wanga Mukulu had been repulsed from extending her authority over Abanyala and their Abatsotso allies. Thus, Sakwa fled to seek refuge in Kabras from where he was to be bailed by the Abarama.

=== Nabongo Mumia and the East Africa Protectorate ===
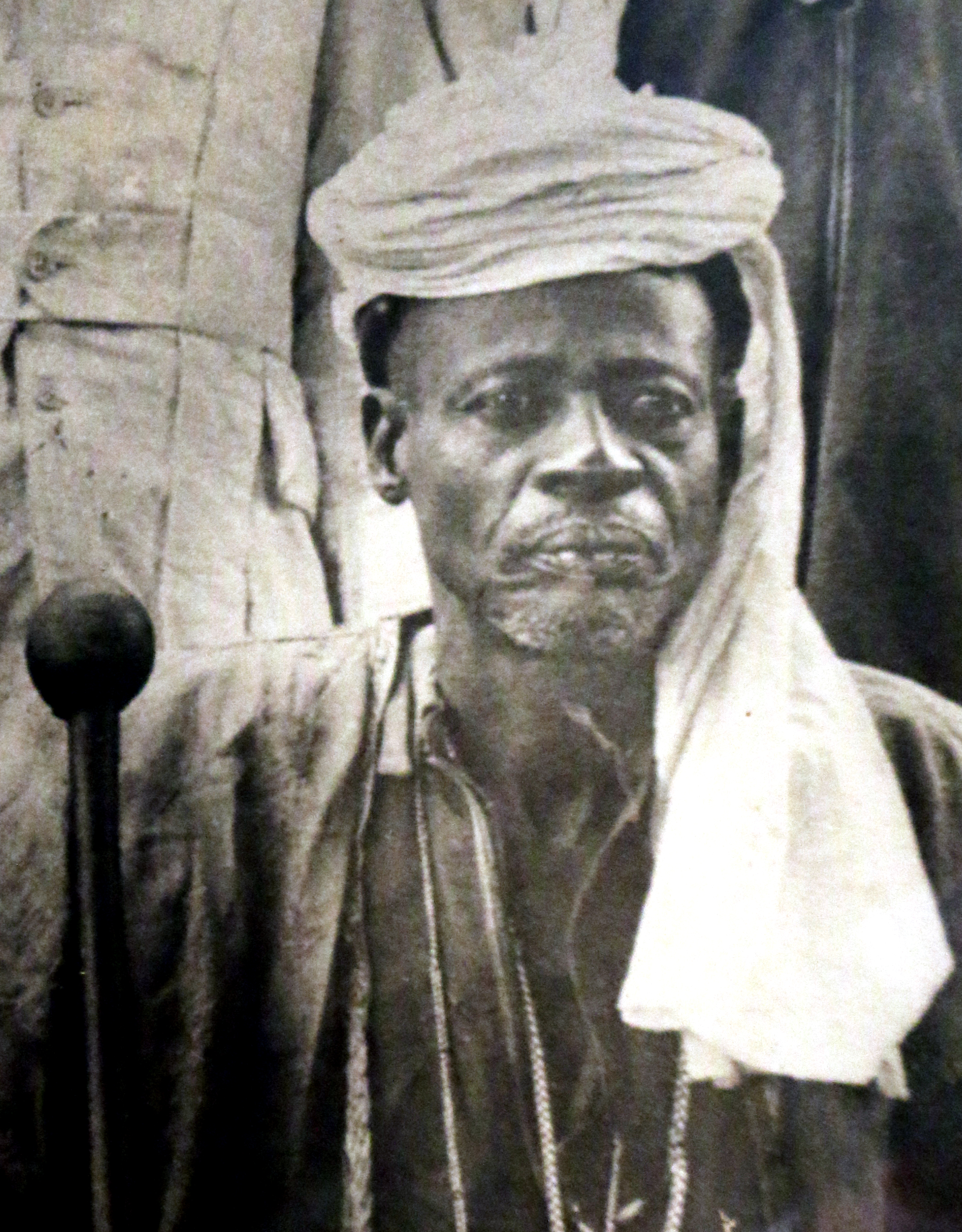
Nabongo Mumia Shiundu, (circa 1908)

Nabongo Mumia Shiundu (Nabongo Mumia) was the 17th Nabongo and became king (paramount chief) of an expansive region of Kenya at the beginning of British imposition of colonial rule in East Africa. Nabongo Mumia is regarded as the most powerful and well known ruler of the Wanga Kingdom, coming to power during the East Africa Protectorate in the 20th century. Nabongo Mumia Shiundu's rule was heavily influenced by an alliance with Arab/Swahili slave traders and conflict with the neighbouring Luo peoples which escalated after the completion of the Uganda Railway by British colonisers. Arab/Swahili slave traders formed an aliance with Wanga to raid neighboring tribes to be sold into the Atlantic slave trade including the Luo and Bukusu Constant conflict led Nabongo Mumia to collaborate with the British who made him a paramount chief of an expansive region of East Africa with various chiefs reporting to him such as Chief Chabasinga who managed Jinja, Uganda, Lenan Tenai who managed the Maasai and chief Odera Akang'o who managed Luo Nyanza.

=== Colony and Protectorate of Kenya ===
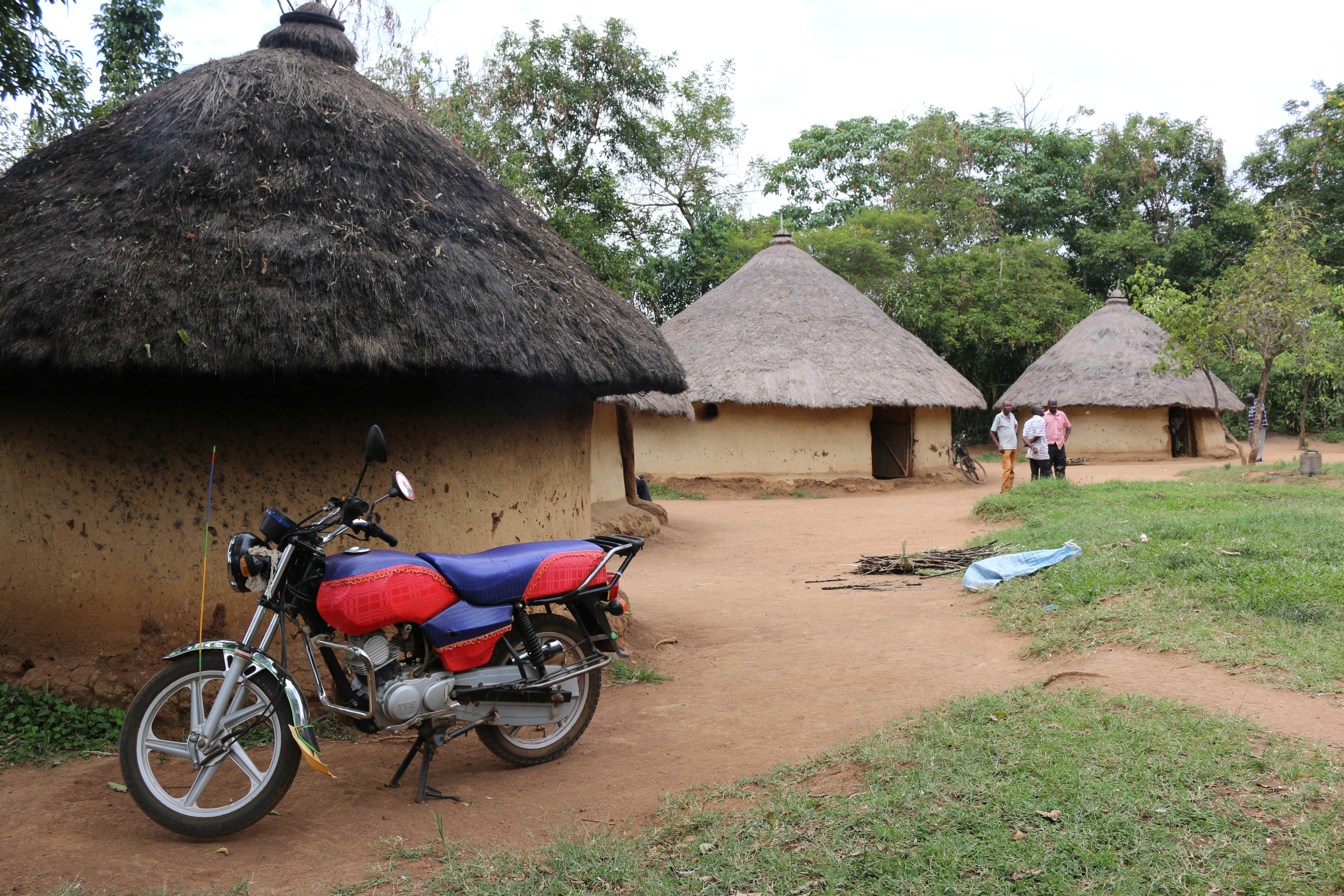
Traditional Luhya homestead at the Nabongo Cultural Centre and Shrine

In 1926, the new Colony and Protectorate of Kenya redefined the Wanga Kingdom's territory to be the equivalent of the modern Western Provence in Kenya today. This act led to the eventual loss of any meaningful political power the Wanga Kingdom had possessed, although Nabongo Mumia remained powerful and influential until his death in 1949.

During the colonial period, other tribes in Kenya such as the Kikuyu people, the Kamba people, the Kalenjin people under Koitalel Arap Samoei, and the Giriama people under Mekatilili Wa Menza all initially resisted British rule. Due to their resistance to colonial rule the British did not extend comparable influence in colonial Kenya during the Scramble for Africa, the British alliance thus led to the prominence of the Wanga kingdom.

The Anglo-Wanga collaboration and trade with Arab/Swahili slavers became profound at a time when most communities of north and central interior of east Africa were not affected by international trade. Other Kenyan tribes did not have any direct dealings with foreigners from the coast, and in most cases many were unwilling to welcome these foreigners into their societies.

The prominence of the Wanga kingdom led to rapid territorial and political expansion by the British in the later years of the 20th century in their quest to conquer Kenya. The British, in their later conquest of the region, found the centrally organized political and social structures attractive and supported them in order to get allies in the imposition of colonial rule.

In 1926, Nabongo Mumia was forced to retire by the British colonial government, he refused to take a 250 shilling monthly pension he was offered as compensation by the British until the colonial leaders threatened to arrest him. Nabongo Mumia died in 1949 and was succeeded by his son Nabongo Shitawa. Mumias was originally known as Lureko, but was renamed in Nabongo Mumia's honour.

=== 1949 onwards ===
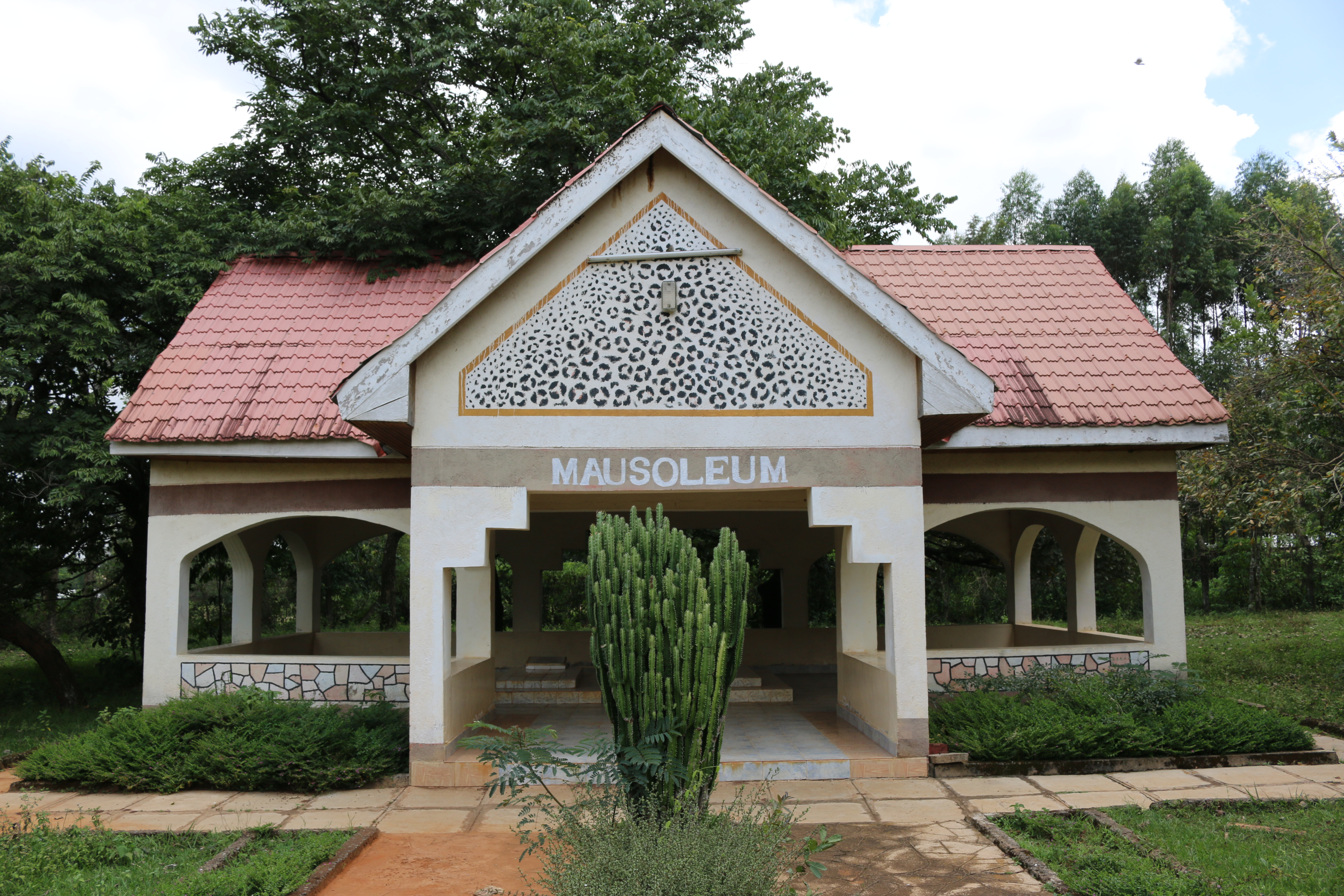
Mausoleum at the Nabongo Cultural Centre and Shrine

Today, Kakamega District is inhabited predominantly by the Wanga people, one of 17 sub-ethnic groups of the Abaluyia of Western Kenya.

In recent times, Mumias has been dominated by the sugar cane industry, with the Mumias Sugar Company Limited being the largest sugar manufacturer in Kenya, producing around 42% Kenyas annual sugarcane output.

In 2008, the Nabongo Cultural Centre and shrine was opened, preserving cultural traditions and artifacts. The grounds also house a mausoleum containing the graves of previous Wanga kings. The opening was attended by Nabongo Peter Mumia II, Prime Minister Raila Odinga, Deputy Prime Minister Musalia Mudavadi, and ministers James Orengo and Fred Gumo.

== See also ==
- List of rulers of Wanga
- Luhya people
- Luhya languages
- Buganda
- Kabaka of Buganda
