= Musanda =

- Location within Kenya
- Coordinates: 0.22°N 34.45°E
- Country: Kenya
- County: Kakamega County
- Time zone: UTC+3 (EAT)

Musanda is a settlement in Kenya's Kakamega County on the border with Nyanza province.musanda
