= Butsotse =

Butsotso
- Location within Kenya
- Coordinates: 0.35°N 34.7°E
- Country: Kenya
- County: Kakamega County
- Time zone: UTC+3 (EAT)

Butsotso is a settlement in Kenya's Kakamega County. Butsotso is located in Kenya, in the Kakamega County. It has the alternative name of Butsotse.
