= Koyonzo =

- Location within Kenya
- Coordinates: 0°N 34.42°E
- Country: Kenya
- County: Kakamega County
- Established: 1814

Population (2014)
  - Urban: 12,000
  - Metro: 7,000
- Time zone: UTC+3 (EAT)

Koyonzo is a settlement in Kenya's Western Province, Kakamega county. It was initially known as Mamboleo due to its early exposure to the long-distance traders from the Mombasa to Buganda Kingdom. Koyonzo was in the Wanga Kingdom which was led by Nabongo Mumia. It is currently located along Mumias-Busia Road, a gateway to Uganda. The town is surrounded by the villages of Ngairwe, Munanziri, Mung'ungu, Mwira, Mirere, Matungu, Ejinja and Lunganyiro.
