= Kakamega Gold Rush =

1930s gold rush in Kenya

The Kakamega gold rush occurred at Kakamega, Kenya in the early 1930s, fueled partly by the reports of the geologist Albert Ernest Kitson. In his report for the Colonial Office Kitson suggested that possibly as much as half of the gold being prospected was wasted by amateur techniques. In an article for the magazine The Spectator, Kitson compared the influx of amateur gold-prospectors to the Klondike Gold Rush in Canada in 1897-8 : "The road to Kakamega now resembles a miniature 'trail of 98' without the snow. Old mining men, from ex-Klondyke Pioneers to Australian backwoodsmen, are hurrying to the spot". But it seems that Kitson's initial report had helped create the rush in the first place by highlighting the rich pickings available. As The Spectator noted "Since the publication of Sir Albert Kitson's report, the population of the Kakamega goldfields had doubled". Kitson's article in this magazine merely fueled the rush still further.

The European settlers, who had been hard hit by the Great Depression, responded eagerly to news that there might be gold in the Kakamega region. Even today the region is honeycombed with abandoned miners' huts.

The largest nugget discovered was called the Elbon Nugget named by reversing the surname of its discoverers the Noble family; Royce Noble, Daniel Noble
