= Matungu =

Town in Western Province, Kenya

Coordinates: 0°23′N 34°28′E

Matungu is a small town in the Western Province of Kenya. It is located in the Kakamega County.

The Matungu Constituency carved out of the larger Mumias Constituency in 1997. It was created following complaints by a section of residents of Mumias that they felt unrepresented due to the large size of the constituency. It was first represented in Parliament in 1998 by Joseph Wamukoya on a Kenya African National Union (KANU) ticket. In 2002 they elected David Were to represent them on a NARC ticket. Historically Matungu is the burial grounds of the Nabongo's (Kings) of the Wanga Kingdom. Today it is mainly a sugarcane growing area and many of its residents are farmers who supply the Mumias Sugar Company with its raw material. The constituency borders Bumula, which falls under the larger Bungoma County. The predominant community of the Luhya sub-tribe, the Wanga and partly the Bukusu are the natives.

== Clans ==
The wanga are the most influential in the area of Matungu, which emerged as a famous clan during the colonial days when their king, Nabongo Mumia collaborated with the British in pre-independence Kenya. The town is the kings homeland came to be named after him, as Mumias. Other clans include the Bukusu, the Abasitsetse, the Abakolwe, etc.

Matungu constituency is now divided into five wards. Each ward is headed by an MCA. This includes Koyonzo, Mayoni, Kholera, Khalaba, Namamali.
