= Matungu Constituency =

Electoral constituency in Kenya

Matungu
- constituency for the Parliament of Kenya
- Matungu Constituency within Kakamega County

- Kakamega County within Kenya
- County: Kakamega
- Population: 166,940
- Area: 276 km^{2} (106.6 sq mi)

Current constituency
- Number of members: 1
- Party: ODM
- Member of Parliament: Peter Oscar Nabulindo
- Wards: 5

Matungu Constituency is an electoral constituency in Kenya. It is one of twelve constituencies in Kakamega County and one four in the former Butere/Mumias District. The constituency was established for the 1997 elections.

== Members of Parliament ==
Elections	MP	Party	Notes
1997	J. P Wamukoya	KANU	
2002	David Were	NARC	
2007	David Were	ODM	
2013	David Were	NFK	
2017	Justus Makokha Murunga	ANC	
2021	Peter Oscar Nabulindo	ANC	
2022	Peter Oscar Nabulindo	ODM	

== Wards ==
Wards
Ward	Registered Voters	Local Authority
Khalaba	4,985	Butere/Mumias County Council
Kholera	9,479	Butere/Mumias County Council
Koyonzo	10,516	Butere/Mumias County Council
Namamali	9,978	Butere/Mumias County Council
Mayoni	6,595	Mumias municipality
Total	41,553	September 2005
