= Shamberere Technical Training Institute =

Shamberere Technical Training Institute is a middle-level college in Western Kenya, located in South Kabras near the West Kenya Sugar Factory. It has over 300 students, most boarders at the institute.

== History ==
The institute was started in 1984 as a rural development school offering grade test, craft and tailoring. Later, it was upgraded to a Youth Polytechnic, and was put under the care of the Youth Affairs Ministry. In April 2009, the Polytechnic was upgraded to a National Technical Training Institute, offering diploma courses.

== Courses ==
Diploma in Electrical and Electronics Engineering, Mechanical Engineering, Civil Engineering, Business Administration, ICT, Agriculture Engineering and Textile Engineering. Certificate courses include electrical installation, motor vehicle, masonry, joinery, and tailoring.

== Instruction ==
The institute has qualified lecturers to cover all courses that they have to offer.

== Communications ==
The institute has good road network coverage. It is about 1 km from Kakunga Junction on Kakunga-West Kenya Road. The mobile phone network at the institute is said to be excellent with all the four mobile operators in the country covering the area from the surrounding base stations at Bukhaywa, Kakoyi and West Kenya. The institute operates the postal address 1316-50100 Kakamega.
