= Lurambi Constituency =

Electoral constituency of Kenya

Lurambi Constituency is an electoral constituency in Kenya. It is one of twelve constituencies in Kakamega County. The constituency was established for the 1963 elections.

== Members of Parliament ==
Elections	MP	Party	Notes
1963	Jonathan Welangai Masinde	KADU	
1969		KANU	
1974	Shadrack N. Kova	KANU	One-party system
1979	Wasike Ndombi	KANU	One-party system
1983	Reuben Otutu	KANU	One-party system.
1988	Wasike Ndombi	KANU	One-party system.
1992	Javan Ambululi Omani	Ford-A, KANU	
1997	Newton Wanjala Kulundu	Ford-K	
2002	Newton Wanjala Kulundu	NARC	
2007	Atanas Manyala Keya	ODM	
2013	Theophilus Kipleting	DAP	
2017	Mukhwana Titus Khamala	ANC	

Wards

Ward	Registered Voters	Local Authority
Amalemba	3,522	Kakamega municipality
Bukhulunya	2,223	Kakamega municipality
Central	10,147	Kakamega municipality
Mahiakalo	3,217	Kakamega municipality
Maraba	2,057	Kakamega municipality
Matende	2,502	Kakamega municipality
Milimani	2,044	Kakamega municipality
Musaa	2,126	Kakamega municipality
Shibiriri	2,731	Kakamega municipality
Sichilayi	3,820	Kakamega municipality
Bukura	6,369	Kakamega County
Bunyala West	9,509	Kakamega County
Navakholo	15,555	Kakamega County
North Butsotso	13,324	Kakamega County
South Butsotso	12,347	Kakamega County
Total	91,493	
*September 2005.
