= Newton Kulundu =

Kenyan politician

Minister of Environment and Natural Resources
- In office 2003–2005
- President: Mwai Kibaki

Minister for Labour and Human Resource Development
- In office 2005–2008
- President: Mwai Kibaki

Member of Parliament for Lurambi Constituency
- In office 1997–2007

Personal details
- Born: June 30, 1948 Kenya
- Died: March 7, 2010 (aged 61) Kenya
- Party: Ford-Kenya
- Education: University of Nairobi; Loma Linda University
- Occupation: Politician, Medical Doctor

Newton Kulundu (June 30, 1948 – March 7, 2010) was a Kenyan politician. He was the Minister of Environment and Natural Resources (2003–2005) and Minister for Labour and Human Resource Development in the Ministry of Labour (2005–2008), and a Member of Parliament in Lurambi Constituency (1997–2007).

== Career ==
After Newton graduated from Kakamega School (1965–1968), and Kenyatta College (1969–1970), he joined the University of Nairobi from where he graduated with a degree in Medicine and Surgery in 1977.He joined the Ministry of Health where he served as a Senior Medical Officer of Health in Kisumu, Kwale, Lamu and Kisii Districts. He was involved in the training of technical staff in the ministry's expanded immunisation program activities all over the country, and assisted in the formulation of health policy under the district focus for rural development program.

He later held a master's degree in Public Health from Loma Linda University in Southern California, United States. He was appointed Senior Company Doctor with the Brooke Bond Company (1984–1997), where he designed and implemented an award-winning reproduction health program. He becomes a past chairman of the parliamentary Committee on Health, Housing, Labour and Social Welfare (1998–2003) and organizing a health conference for Members of Parliament when President Daniel Moi declared HIV/Aids a national disaster.

Dr. Kulundu first entered parliament as the Member of Parliament for Lurambi constituency in 1997 on a Ford-Kenya Ticket. In 2002, he was re-elected to parliament and was initially appointed the minister for Environment, Natural Resources and Wildlife, before being appointed minister for Labour, a position he held till 2008.

Dr. Kulundu will be remembered for his verbal exchange with a foreign diplomat in a public forum (directed against US Ambassador Michael Ranneberger) on 24 October 2007 while launching a report entitled "Trafficking in Persons from a Labour Perspective, the Kenyan experience".

== Death ==
Newton Kulundu died on March 7, 2010, after battling pancreatic cancer for a short while.
