= Kilingili =

Kilingili is a village in Kakamega County and Vihiga County, Kenya. It currently has a population of about 3000.

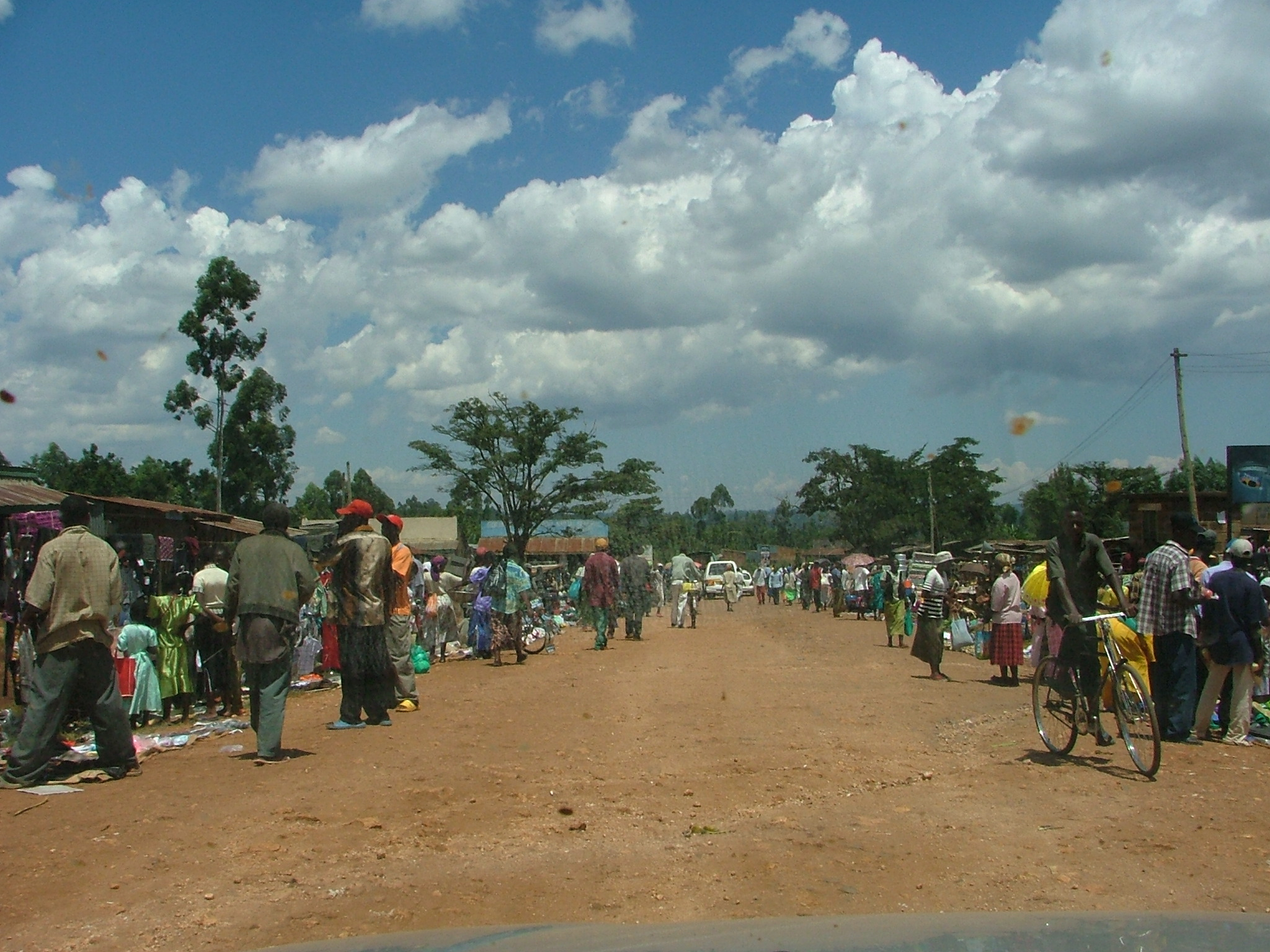
Kilingili on "Market Day"

== Education ==
Kilingili is home to two schools, Kilingili Primary School and Kilingili Girls Secondary School.

== Health ==
Kilingili currently has one health center. Kilingili Health Center is staffed with one doctor, who is assisted by several nurse practitioners, nurse aides, and an RN.

== Police ==
Kilingili is home to a divisional police headquarters.

Due to it being an intersection point between Emuhaya, Vihiga, and Kakamega Districts, if one is believed to have committed a crime within the Kakamega District part of Kilingili then that matter must be dealt with the Kakamega District police headquarters, rather than with the much closer Kilingili police divisional headquarters. However, due to local agreements, accused individuals will be held by local forces until the appropriate officers arrive.

== Religion ==
Kilingili is largely Christian with the largest denomination belonging to the Church of God. In addition, the area has a minority of residents who identify as Muslim.

=== Christian Churches ===
Kilingili Church of God, Kilingili Catholic Church, Pentecostal Church of Kilingili

=== Mosques ===
Ramadan Mosque of Kilingili
