= List of rulers of Wanga =

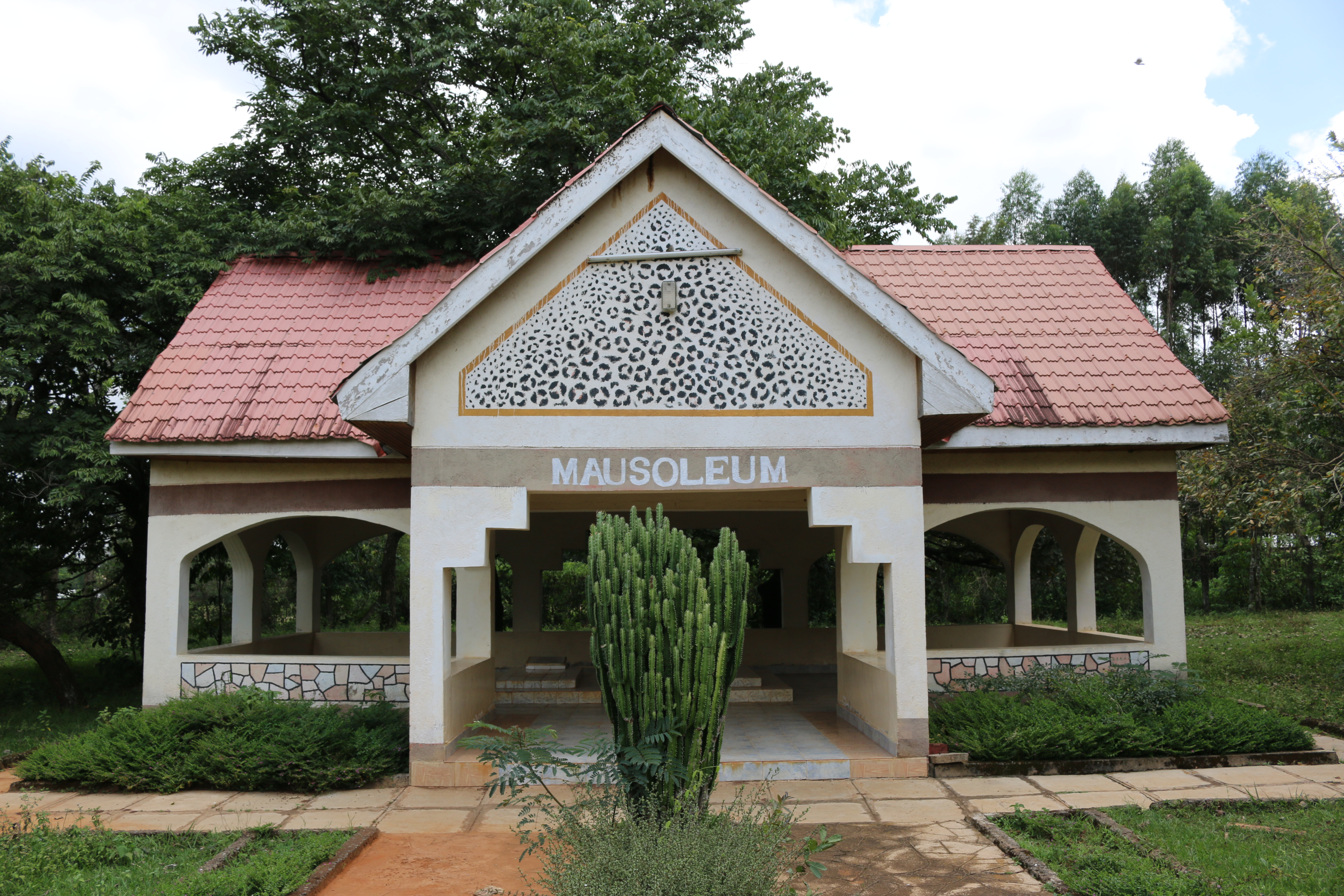
Nabongo Cultural Centre and Shrine (mausoleum)

List of rulers of Wanga Kingdom in Kenya.

Though the Wanga kingdom king's list actually starts from the re-known founder Wanga, some researchers date them back to the old Egyptian kings time where they were under the leadership of Makata. They assert that through their migration, they passed through many places such as Cameroon, Ethiopia where they were under the leadership of Simbi and Nangwera. While in Uganda they were ruled by several Buganda kings such as Muteesa, Kamaanyi, Mwanga (also Muwanga), Mbwoli (also Mbwoti), Muwanga II. Later, Wamoyi settled in Ibanda in Samia (Uganda), and Muwanga III, his son, migrated to Lela in Nyanza Kenya around the 10th century. The children of Muwanga III were Khabiakala, Wamoyi, Wanga, Wekhoba, Mukoya, Mutende and Sakwa. They all dispersed to different regions to search for a better place to live.

Muwanga III's son called Sakwa migrated to Bondo along the Lake Victoria basin. The other son Mutende, migrated southwards and settled in Kuria. The other four sons: Wamoyi, Wanga, Wekhoba and Mukoya moved to Tiriki after being invited by a cousin of them called Mukolwe who had settled earlier in Maragoli.

It is related that later, Wanga secretly moved towards the West alone and arrived in a place called Imanga in South Wanga in Mumias West sub-county.

A split of the royal clan occurred. The split started after Nabongo Osundwa died. One son Wamukoya remained in Mumias and the eldest son Kweyu relocated to Wanga Mukulu (Mumias East). The lineage of the Wanga Mukulu is as follows: Nabongo Kweyu son of Nabongo Osundwa. Nabongo Sakwa son of Nabongo Kweyu (signed the Anglo-German treaty with Dr. Carl Peters). Nabongo Lutomia Son of Nabongo Sakwa. Nabongo Rapando I son of Nabongo Lutomia. Nabongo William Wambani son of Rapando I. Nabongo Maurice Rapando II son of Nabongo William Wambani (Reigning King of Wanga Mukulu).

Nakhisa in his research mentions a list of kings who ruled the Wanga as follows:[4]

Name of Nabongo (King)	Time of reign	Notes
Wanga	1050 - 1140	Foundation of the Kingdom of Wanga
Wabala	1140 - 1190	
Musuwi	1190 - 1274	
Chibwire	1274 - 1354	
Musindalo	1354 - 1464	
Chitechi	1464 - 1554	
Netya	1554 - 1617	
Osundwa	1617 - 1717	
Wamukoya	1717 - 1797	
Shiundu	1797 -1880	
Mumia	1880 - 1949	Significant historic figure, ruled during the colonial period.
Shitawa	1949 - 1974	
Peter Mumia II	1974 to present	
