= Butere =

- Town
- Nickname: But
- Location within Kenya
- Coordinates: 00°13′N 34°30′E
- Country: Kenya
- County: Kakamega County

Area
  - Total: 939.3 km^{2} (362.7 sq mi)

Population (2009)
  - Total: 4,725
  - Density: 5.030/km^{2} (13.03/sq mi)

Butere is a town in Kakamega County, which was formerly part of the Western Province of Kenya. According to the 2019 Kenya National Census, it has an Urban population of 154,100. Until 2010, Butere served as the capital of the former Butere/Mumias District.

== Transportation links ==
Butere is connected by road to Mumias to the north and Kisumu in the southeast. The fastest way to Butere is via air which takes approximately 1:38 hrs, and the bus takes approximately 7:30 hrs. A branch railway line from Kisumu ends in Butere, with passenger services not yet resumed in 2025

The town's name, Butere, came from the Abatere sub-clan, one of the main clans in the area. Historically, the Abatere lived in regions such as Muyundi, Masaba, and areas around the township. They were the primary inhabitants until the European colonial administration selected Butere as a base for their administrative activities.

== Economy ==
Like its neighboring sub-counties, for many years, the economy of Butere was heavily dependent on sugarcane cultivation. However, because the sugar industry proved unfeasible for many farmers, some have removed sugarcane from their farms and resorted to cultivating maize and soybeans. Some other residents depend on small-scale cattle-rearing, apiculture, and aquaculture for their livelihood.

Traditionally, the people of Butere have been small-scale farmers planting sorghum, millet, maize, and assorted vegetables, alongside fishing in Lake Victoria and trading these produce with their neighbors from the south in Nyanza. Many farmers cultivated soybeans, but only around 56.72% commercialized them.

The introduction of maize eventually changed the main staple food from ugali, made from sorghum, to maize meal. The late Mr. Naaman Otswong'o Chirande, a businessman and the area councilor between 1969 and 1974, brought significant development to lower Butere Market, including the main market, particularly through cattle sales.

As most residents of Butere have relied on sugarcane cultivation as a source of income alongside other farming activities, they strongly believe that political leadership should seek an alternative industry to serve the needs of the local economy, as the sugar industry seemed too difficult to resuscitate after the Mumias Sugar Company Limited collapsed for many years . This has since changed with its establishment in 2025.

== Boda Boda ==
Following an increase in unemployment in the sub-country, many youths have engaged in the motorbike business (commonly known as boda boda). This business earns them an average of 500 Ksh a day.

== Self-help groups ==
In the recent past, there has been an upsurge of self-help groups such as One-Acre Farm, Wycliffe Ambetsa Oparanya, Professor Ruth Oniang'o, and Hon. Andrew Toboso. Fred Omukubi Otswong'o (of Shatieta Self-Help Group) has authored an article on the use of intellectual property rights regimes to protect traditional knowledge of local communities, among others.

== Inhabitants ==
The district is inhabited by 17 subtribes, among them Abakolwe, Abashitsetse, Abamukhula, Abatere, Abashirotsa, Abashiahaka, Abamwende, Abashibanga, Abashisa, Aberecheya, and Abachenya. The Marama's most popular dances are the lipala dance and eshiremba (a funeral ceremony dance performed by the Abashibanga clan), which seem to vanish with modernity. The Marama have historically been tied to the Wanga, and the Wanga king Nabongo Mumia was a son to a Marama woman.

== Prominent residents ==
- W.W.W. Awori, pre-Independence legislator and freedom fighter, born in Butere in 1925
- Moody Awori former vice president, born in Butere.
- Martin Shikuku politician.
- Tindi MwaleMP since 2017 to Date, Chairman Public Accounts committee NA, political leader, Business Development associate and Finance/Financial Management Expert and entrepreneur.
- Hon. Professor Amukowa Anangwe Former member of Parliament, Butere constituency. He is the current chairman of the University of Nairobi Council.
- Benson Milimo Lecturer, Moi University, School of Nursing and Midwifery (Currently Chair of Department of Midwifery and Gender)
- Wycliffe Ambetsa Oparanya Cabinet Secretary for Cooperatives and MSME’s.
- Eng. Alfred Chitui Ashiembi community philanthropist who supports children's education, with a focus on girls and orphans.
- Wycliffe John Tsalwa Waburiri The President of East Africa Institute of Architects (EAIA).

== Politics ==
The politics of Butere have been dominated by clan rivalries. Martin Shikuku represented from independence until 1997 with short breaks. Shikuku first lost the seat in the mid-1970s when he was detained by the Jomo Kenyatta government for saying that the then-ruling party, Kenya African National Union (KANU), was dead. Upon his release when Moi took over in 1978, Shikuku won the seat in 1979 through a by-election. Shikuku lost his seat to Jesse Eshikhati Opembe in the 1988 mlolongo elections. Opembe died only six months after the election, paving the way for Moses Okwara, who won the ensuing by-election. Shikuku returned to recapture the seat in the 1992 multiparty elections on the Kenneth Matiba led FORD-Asili party and represented the constituency for one term until former University of Nairobi Lecturer, Dr. Amukowa Anangwe, defeated him in the 1997 general elections in which Shikuku also ran for the presidency. Anangwe was, however, was ousted 2002 by Wycliffe Oparanya.

The 2007 election was again won by Oparanya as the constituency seemed to abandon Musikari Kombo in favor of the Orange Democratic Movement (ODM), now led by former Prime Minister and Langata MP Raila Odinga. This was evidenced by an apparent rush by most politicians to troop to the party, among them former Minister Dr. Amukowa Anangwe, Businessman Justus Anyanga Wanekeya, and Arch. Mohammed Munyanya.

The formation of the United Democratic Forum Party (UDFP) arising from the systematic breakaway of the Pentagon into a rival party, had a major impact on the 2013 elections. In recent by-elections, UDFP managed to show its national strength by emerging second in Kangema Constituency.

In 2017, Tindi Mwale new entrant in political arena, won with 18,213 votes against incumbent Andrew Toboso 11,560.In 2022, Tindi Mwale received a direct ODM ticket from Baba Raila Amollo Odinga, Baba Raila Amollo Odinga anointed Mwale as Captain JeshilaBaba, Mwale went on to win Member of Parliament on the Orange Democratic Movement ticket against his competitor Habil Nanjendo of the Amani National Congress. Mwale received 23,898 votes.

== Religion ==
The division is predominantly Christian with Anglican background, though other denominations claim a significant percentage of followers. Horace Etemesi, a former Bishop of Butere ACK diocese, successfully used the ACK influence on plant Dr. Anangwe as area MP in 1997 over Martin Shikuku, a Catholic. However, his influence was insignificant in the wake of the 2002 NARC wave. The Late Naaman Otswong'o and Philip Ingutia used the Church to gain mileage in business and farming, respectively. Today, many Butere residents continue to positively contribute to the church's development, including scholars like Fred Omukubi Otswong'o of JKUAT.

== Academic institutions ==
The sub-county has one national and one provincial secondary school: Butere Girls' High School (national school) and Butere Boys' High School (extra-county school). The sub county also has numerous day secondary schools, with Lunza Secondary School being the largest in terms of the student population and perennially good performances. Others are Bukolwe, Shiatsala, Shikunga, and Bumamu Secondary School.

The introduction of the Constituency Development Fund saw Buchenya Girls' School being chosen as a center of academic excellence due to its central location. Shibembe Secondary, Mukoye Girls, and Mabole Boys have also been recently established.

There are several primary schools in the district, with Butere Primary School, Buchenya Primary, and Shirembe Primary School being the most prominent.

There are small kindergartens in the subcounty, including a self-help group driven by Shatieta Nursery School and fronted by Fred Omukubi.
