= Nairobi Technical Training College =

Institute in Nairobi

The Nairobi Technical Training Institute (NTTI) is a technical and vocational education and training institute in Kenya. As of October 2016, it is one of the many accredited TVET centers in the country. Unlike the Kenyan universities that is supervised by the Commission for University Education, technical and vocational institutions receive accreditation from the Technical and Vocational Education and Training Authority of Kenya.

== Location ==
The institute currently has one learning center that serves as the main campus. It is located in Nairobi. Nairobi Technical Training Institute is located at Ngara Area along Mogira Road, off Park Road and Ring Road, between Kariokor and Pangani Police Station.

== History ==
Nairobi Technical Training Institute derives its history as far back as the year 1951 when it started as "Modern High School" catering predominantly for the Asian community resident in the neighborhood. Though a secondary school, the curriculum offered at the time had a bias towards the inculcation of vocational skills which encompassed Mechanical Engineering and Carpentry & Joinery. In 1953, the name of the school was changed to Technical High School and the Cambridge School Certificate Examination was first taken in 1954. At independence and in the spirit of the Ominde Education Commission of 1964, the school opened its doors to all ethnicities. The curriculum continued to lay emphasis on Technical Education and was expanded to include Plant Mechanical, Woodwork, Electrical and Motor Vehicle mechanics skills. Both O-Level and A-level classes were accommodated.

== Academics ==
Nairobi Technical Training Institute offers courses on full-time, part-time and evening basis. Courses are categorized into Certificate, Diploma and Higher Diploma. The institute courses covers a wide range of fields including mechanics and mechanical engineering, Electronics and electrical engineering, institutional management, business studies, health and applied sciences. Some of the courses offered in NIIT are listed below.

== See also ==
- List of universities and colleges in Kenya
