= David Were =

Kenyan politician

David Aoko Were is a Kenyan politician. He belongs to the Orange Democratic Movement and was elected to represent the Matungu Constituency in the National Assembly of Kenya since the 2007 Kenyan parliamentary election.
