= Martin Shikuku =

Kenyan politician (1932–2012)

Joseph Martin Shikuku Oyondi (December 25, 1932– August 22, 2012) was a Kenyan politician.

Joseph Martin Shikuku Oyondi was born on Christmas day 1932 in Magadi Kenya. His father was John Osule Oyondi and he was married to Lucia Andeche in the Catholic church in 1929. They had seven children. Shikuku was the second born.

== Early life ==
Shikuku attended St Peters Mumias boys primary school, a Catholic school in western Kenya. After completing his primary education he joined St. Peters Seminary for secondary education with the intention of becoming a Catholic priest. This was not to be as he apparently fell in love and left the seminary.

== Career ==
He briefly worked with the Caltex oil company in Kenya then Kenya and then East African Railways before joining politics at a young age of 19 on 18 October 1952.

At the age of 28, he was the youngest member of the Kenyan delegation to Lancaster House Conferences (England), as the youth representative for KADU, a political party which together with KANU went for the talks at Lancaster House which paved way to the Independence of Kenya. He also participated in the crafting of Kenya's first Constitution.

He joined Nairobi People's Convention Party (NPCP), becoming its Secretary-General soon afterwards. He later resigned to join the Kenya African Democratic Union (KADU) as a youth leader along with future President Daniel Moi and Ronald Ngala. Shikuku was elected the Butere Constituency MP in 1963 on KADU ticket. His party merged soon later with Kenya African National Union KANU, the only legal party during the subsequent Kenyan single-party era. Shikuku was the last member to cross the floor of the House to join the one government after the Merger of Kanu and Kadu.

He retained the Butere seat in 1969 was appointed Assistant Minister in the Office of the Vice-President and Home Affairs by the President Jomo Kenyatta. Later Shikuku was detained by Kenyatta after the minister sarcastically referred the KANU government as "dead". Shikuku was released in 1978 when Daniel arap Moi took over as the President upon Kenyatta's death. Shikuku recaptured the Butere parliamentary seat the next year and was appointed Assistant Minister for Livestock Development. He retained his seat at the 1983 elections but lost in 1988.

Kenyan single-party system started to crack in the early 1990s. He was a founding member of Forum for the Restoration of Democracy alongside Jaramogi Oginga Odinga. The forum soon split, and Odinga formed the Ford-Kenya party, while Shikuku Ford Asili with Kenneth Matiba. The 1992 general election were the first multiparty election in Kenya since the 1960s. Matiba was the Ford Asili presidential candidate, while Shikuku recaptured the Butere MP seat on Ford Asili ticket.

Matiba later left Ford Asili and at the 1997 elections Shikuku was the party's presidential candidate. He did not get many votes and also lost his parliamentary seat.

He died on August 22, 2012, at the Texas Cancer Centre in Hurlingham, Nairobi. aged 79

== Personal life ==
Shikuku was married to Dolarosa Elizbeth Regina Achieng on 24 September 1966 and they had four children; Sylvano Madanji Shikuku (born 16 November 1966), Emmanuel Noel Osyle Shikuku (born 26 December 1968), Lucia Awor Shikuku (born 30 June 1971), and Martina Maende Shikuku (born 26 January 1974, died 5 November 2016).
