= Mumias West Constituency =

Electoral constituency of Kenya

Mumias West
- constituency for the Parliament of Kenya
- Mumias West Constituency within Kakamega County

- Kakamega County within Kenya
- County: Kakamega
- Population: 115,354
- Area: 163 km^{2} (62.9 sq mi)

Current constituency
- Number of members: 1
- Party: ODM
- Member of Parliament: Johnson Manya Naicca
- Wards: 4

Mumias West is a constituency in Kenya. It is one of twelve constituencies in Kakamega County. Mumias West Sub County has an approximate population of 111862, with an approximate area of 165.3 square km. There are four wards in Mumias West namely: Mumias central, Mumias North, Etenje, and Musanda.

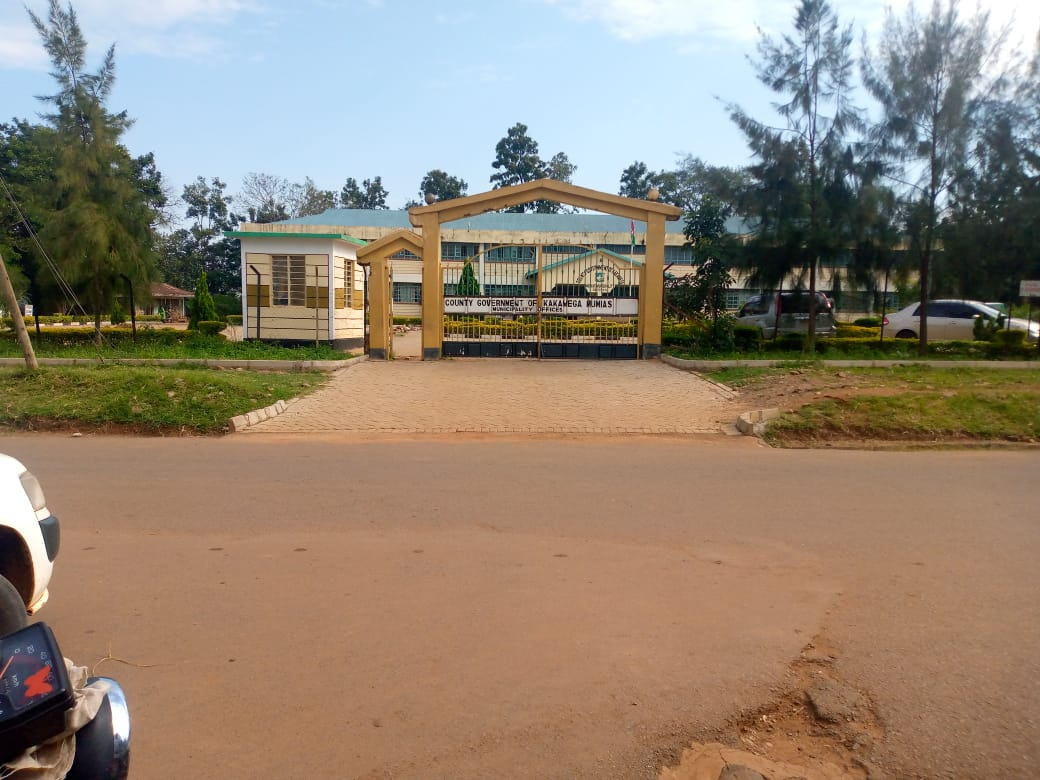
The main gate of Mumias Sub County Office taken from the Southern direction

Ward name	Approx. Population	Approx. area in square km
Mumias central	37214	33.6
Mumias north	15765	35.7
Etenje	28162	50.6
Musanda	30721	45.4

The current member of parliament of Mumias West sub county is Hon. Naicca, Johnson Manya who has been on the seat from the year 2013 up to date on the ODM party ticket.
