= Benjamin Jomo Washiali =

Kenyan politician

Benjamin Jomo Washiali is a Kenyan politician. He belonged to the Orange Democratic Movement and was elected to represent the Mumias East Constituency in the National Assembly of Kenya since the 2007 Kenyan parliamentary electionbut was later elected in 2017 to represent the constituent through a jubilee party which is headed by H.E Uhuru Kenyatta
