= Joseph Wamukoya =

Kenyan politician

Dr. Joseph Pius O Wamukoya (22 August 1942 – 3 May 2021) was a Kenyan politician, and was, until December 2002 an Assistant Minister in the Kenya African National Union (KANU) government of Daniel arap Moi.

Moi had appointed him assistant minister in the Ministry of Lands and Settlement in June 2001.
