= Nabongo Mumia =

Leader of Wanga Kingdom and official in colonial Kenya (c. 1849–1949)

Nabongo Nabongo Mumia Shiundu
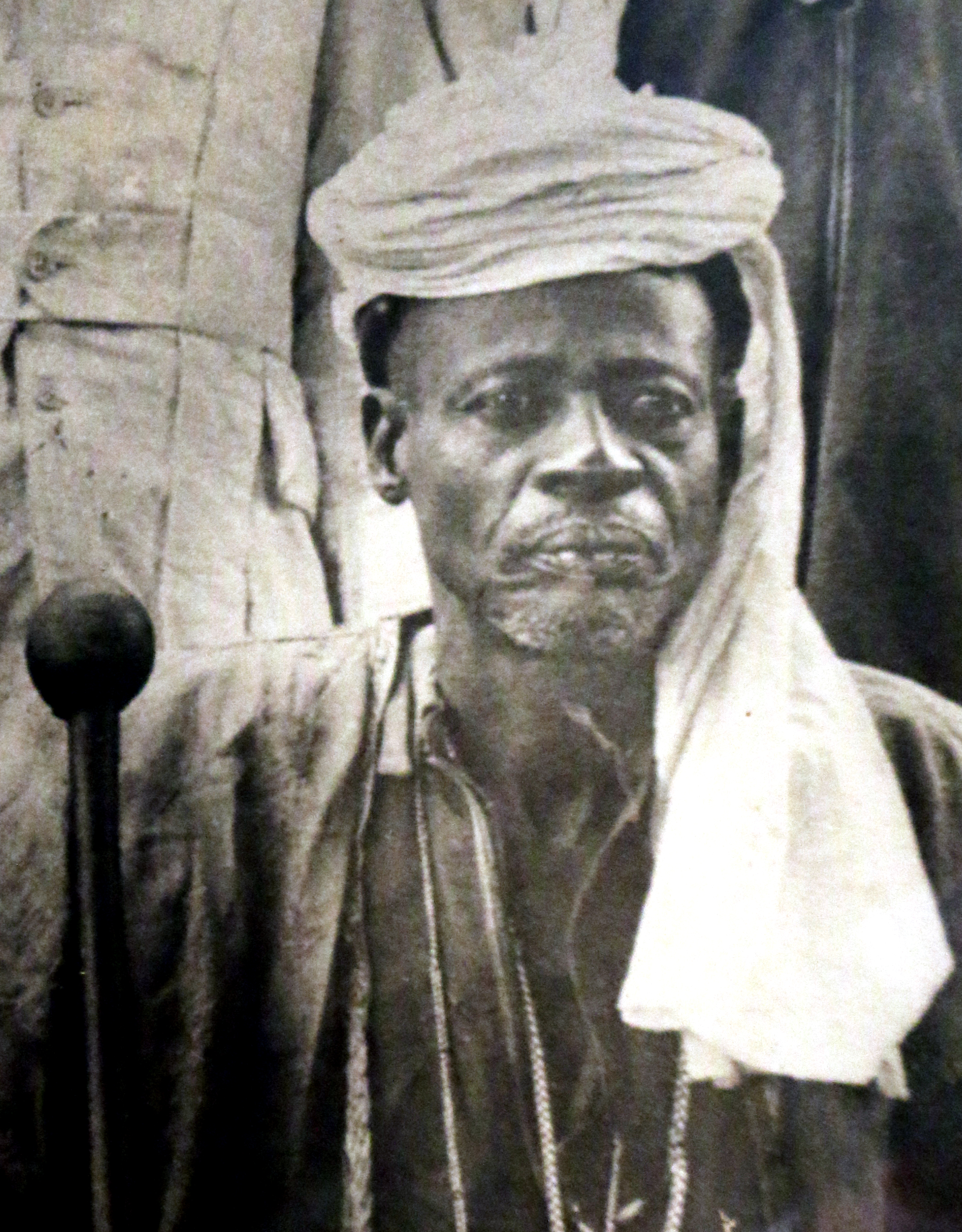

King of Wanga Kingdom
- In office 01 May 1882 – 24 April 1949
- Preceded by: Nabongo Shiundu
- Succeeded by: Nabongo Shitawa

Paramount Chief of Sub-district No.1 of East Africa Protectorate and Protectorate of Uganda
- In office 05 June 1909 – 19 October 1926
- Monarch: Edward VII
- Preceded by: (position created by gazettement of East Africa Protectorate and Protectorate of Uganda)
- Succeeded by: (position regazatted by Kenya Colony)

Paramount Chief of North Kavirondo district of Kenya Colony
- In office 19 October 1926 – 24 April 1949
- Monarch: George V

Personal details
- Born: c. 1849 in what is today Kenya
- Died: April 24, 1949 (aged 99)
- Resting place: Itokho, Mumias
- Occupation: king of Wanga Kingdom
- Known for: leading the Wanga Kingdom at a time of its peak influence in pre-colonial Kenya

Nabongo Mumia Shiundu (c. 1849 – 1949) was the 17th King of the Wanga Kingdom, a pre-colonial kingdom in Kenya and Uganda prominent for being a centralised, highly organised kingdom and the most advanced form of government in terms of politics, economy and military in pre-colonial Kenya. He later became paramount chief of an expansive region of Kenya and Uganda at the beginning of British imposition of colonial rule in East Africa.

He is regarded as the greatest ruler of the Wanga Kingdom for his management of the British colonial transition leading to British occupation in Kenya in the 20th century. He led a kingdom that was famous for trade with Arabs in slaves at a time when the Wanga Kingdom was under extreme military pressure from the Luo-Nyanza. This slave trade between the Arab and the Wanga led to capturing of non-Wanga tribes into slavery such as Luo-Nyanza and Bukusu who were also enemies of the Wanga kingdom because of their repeated insurgents against the kingdom. This constant insurgents and military attacks led Nabongo Mumia to collaborate with the British who made him a paramount chief of an expansive region of East Africa with various chiefs reporting to him such as Chief Chabasinga who managed Jinja Busonga, Lenan Tenai who managed the Maasai and chief Odera Akang'o who managed Luo Nyanza.

At the time the Wanga Kingdom extended from present day Jinja, Uganda to present day Naivasha, Kenya with the main ruling town present day Mumias. Nabongo Mumia's gazetement as a paramount chief in 1913 legitimized his rule as a king of the Wanga and paramount chief. In 1926, the British colonial government regazetted his region of management to North kavirondo equivalent to western region of Kenya today. This regazetement led to the eventual loss of political relevance of the Wanga Kingdom, although Nabongo Mumia remained a powerful and influential figure until his death in 1949. His prominence, power and influence was evident in during his burial in 1949 when high-ranking members of the colonial government were in attendance.

== Biography ==
=== Early life ===
Nabongo Mumia was born a prince between 1849 and 1852. His parents were Nabongo Shiundu Wamukoya and Wamanya.

==== Abashitsetse clan ====
Nabongo Mumia was born into the abashitstes, one of the 22 clans that comprises the Wanga tribe. The abashitse is the clan that formed the royal lineage that produced the Nabongos (Wanga Kings).

He grew up as an ordinary Wanga child participating in domestic animal herding, farming, hunting and gathering and his most notable achievement was killing a lion and leopard by the time he was 18 years old. His physique of being thin, having a deep voice and his shyness towards strangers made his father Nabongo Wamukoya repeatedly loath him for being an unlikely candidate for the Nabongoship (kingship). Nevertheless, his father eventually appointed him heir reluctantly.

Nabongo Mumia's mother Queen Wamanya supported Nabongo Mumia's quest of inheritance of the kingdom and even manoeuvered against other members of the family who were in line to the throne in lieu for Nabongo Mumia. This made Nabongo Mumia King by circumstance as opposed to the tradition of kingdom inheritance based on clan members who are in line of succession. The king then had a total of 13 wives and 18 sons who all had equal chances of becoming king.

=== Personal life ===
Nabongo Mumia married multiple wives. Polygamy was largely practised by the Wanga Kingdom to ensure stability with other communities through inter-marriage.

=== Reign ===
==== Arab-Wanga trade & military insurgents ====
The Arabs began dealing and had traded with the Wanga Kingdom since early 19th century. It was not until the change of leadership at the Wanga Kingdom, at the beginning of the reign of Nabongo Mumia, that the Wanga Kingdom began to employ the Arabs and Swahili traders in fighting enemies of the kingdom directly.

The Arabs were in search for land to hunt for game and slaves. Nabongo Mumia changed strategy from that employed by previous Wanga kings by employing Arabs directly in the military wars against neighboring communities of Luo-Nyanza and Bukusu. This change of tact gave the Wanga Kingdom an upper hand in the military's invasion against insurgents but never solved the repeated threat of insurgents of the kingdom until the gazettement of administrative region of leadership which he was appointed paramount chief during the inquest of the British. The Anglo-Arab collaboration still did not alleviate military pressure of the Wanga Kingdom especially because of repeated conflicts on matters of territorial boundaries against the Luo-ugenya, failed conquests of additional lands and territories within the Luo-ugenya lands.

The Arabs were able to capture slaves from the Luo and Bukusu by directly participating in fighting enemies of the Wanga Kingdom.

These repeated interactions with the Arab later made the Wanga predominantly Islam. Around 1890, when Fredick Lugard met Nabongo Mumia, he observed that he spoke pretty good Swahili and the larger Wanga community had Islamic regalia and demeanour. Nabongo Mumia became a Muslim and died a Muslim.

==== Collaboration with the British ====
He was appointed heir on the eve of his father's death. Mumia occupied a prominent place in British colonial administration from 1908 to 1926 and was recognised as the Paramount Chief. He ruled the Kingdom for 67 years from 1882 to 1949 in one of the longest reigns in African history.

The Wanga Kingdom was the most highly developed and centralised kingdom in Kenyan history before the advent of British colonialism. When the British arrived in Western Kenya in 1883, they found the Wanga Kingdom as the only organised state with a centralised hereditary monarch in the whole of what later came to be known as Kenya. Mumia had heard stories that the British colonial administration appointed colonial paramount chiefs in their quest to seek assistance in imposition of colonial rule.

Nabongo Mumia used foresight and intelligence in initiating relations with the British and accepting to collaborate with the British many years before other communities in Kenya had an interaction with foreigners or participated in international trade. This foresight eventually paid off when he was appointed paramount chief in a gazetted appointment that legitimately made chiefs of different regions that previously repeatedly resisted Wanga kingdom leadership eventually submit to him. Previous failed military conquests of the Wanga Kingdom of lands and communities that previously aggressively threatened the stability and supremacy of the kingdom now were forced to report to him. Some of the chiefs that were appointed and reported to him included: Chief Chabasinga who managed Uganda region of Jinja Busonga, Lenan Tenai of Maasai and chief Odera Akang'o who managed Luo Nyanza among others who managed Maragoli, Bukusu, Kisa, Butsoso, Kabras, Busia among others.

Nabongo Mumia had completely annihilated military and territorial threats against the Wanga Kingdom. This victory made Nabongo Mumia a legend among the Abaluya, communities that were conquered and larger Kenya to this day. Because of his intelligence he had managed to win century-old military wars without any bloodshed despite the fact that he was illiterate. Between 1913 and 1926, the Wanga Kingdom experienced exponential growth of its economy. It was during this time that Nabongo Mumia became the first ever Luhya to own a vehicle and a motor cycle. During this time when the American Singer Corporation was expanding its products around the world, its first products were sold in the Wanga Kingdom in East Africa.

By 1926, when the British were beginning to get concerned about Nabongo Mumia's influence on their conflicting interests with their leadership direction about the colonial administration management, they retired him and regazetted his administrative region of management. The colonial administration continued to pay his salary until his death. At the time Nabongo Mumia received a monthly salary of sh250 that amounts to US$7000 monthly pension (in 2020 dollars; inflation-adjusted). This was at a time when poverty levels were exacerbated, and his individual economic might was non-comparable to many in East Africa while supporting a huge polygamous family.

Because Nabongo Mumia was illiterate, he failed to lead the kingdom in making changes and adapting to new political developments in regard to technicalities of the administration. For instance when the British regazetted the geographical region previously under Nabongo Mumia as paramount chief, he still thought that he exercised authority in regions regazetted out of his region. Although he still had personal influence before and after the regazettement, he did not utilize it for political relevance. This inability to distinguish technicalities of his personal influence and that of the kingdom eventually led to the loss of political relevance of the Wanga Kingdom.

Another instance when Jomo Kenyatta, Kenya's first president initiated contact in the talk of decolonization, Nabongo Mumia described the talks as premature and did not support Jomo Kenyatta. Because Mumia was illiterate, he failed to realize the progress experienced in the kingdom was short lived and there was need to evolve. In later years, this cost the Wanga Kingdom political relevance and economic development, because the Wanga Kingdom and regions that were peopled by the Wanga Kingdom remained underdeveloped and were not involved in major political developments such as independence, and subsequent political formations after independence.

Another chance at political relevance was wasted during the coronation of King Edward. Nabongo Mumia was invited to England, but he refused to travel to England under the advice of the Arabs who cautioned that he was likely to be captured. An action that was repeated by Jomo Kenyatta years later when he moved to England with similar concerns and fears, but eventually persuasively achieved diplomatic agreements that contributed in him being later the first president of Kenya at independence.

Despite cognisance of his floundering influence and that of the Wanga Kingdom, Nabongo Mumia remained fiercely loyal to the colonial administration until his death.

=== Death ===
When Mumia died in 1949 of old age, major high-ranking members of the colonial administration such as Philip Mitchell were in attendance.

Following Nabongo Mumia's death, the British government declined to recognize a royal successor to the Paramount Chieftainship, effectively ending the Wanga Kingdom's political authority and replacing it with direct bureaucratic colonial administration, under which subsequent Wanga leaders were treated merely as government employees, with no independent political authority or significance as a kingdom.

== Descendants ==
Mumia's royal background caused a dilemma to the colonial officers. He was “retired” by the colonial authorities in 1926, but maintained influence until his death on April 24, 1949. He left behind multiple descendants including 109 sons, 60 daughters and 400 grandchildren.
