= Mumias East Constituency =

Electoral constituency of Kenya

Mumias East
- constituency for the Parliament of Kenya
- Mumias East Constituency within Kakamega County

- Kakamega County within Kenya
- County: Kakamega
- Population: 116,851
- Area: 150 km^{2} (57.9 sq mi)

Current constituency
- Number of members: 1
- Party: DAP K
- Member of Parliament: Peter Kalerwa Salasya
- Wards: 3

Mumias East is a constituency in Kenya. It is one of twelve constituencies in Kakamega County. The constituency has three (3) Wards – Lusheya-lubinu, Malaha-isongo-makunga and East Wanga. The population of each ward is as detailed below:

No.	Ward name	Approx. Population	Approx. area in square km
1	Lusheya-lubinu	37,609	57.0
2	Malaha-isongo-makunga	31,004	43.4
3	East Wanga	32,343	35.1
