= Mumias =

- Municipality
- Location within Kenya
- Coordinates: 0°20′N 34°29′E
- Country: Kenya
- County: Kakamega County

Population (2009)
  - Total: 116,358
- Time zone: UTC+3 (EAT)

Mumias is a town in Kakamega County of Kenya. The town has an urban population of 116,358 (2009 census) and is the second largest town in Kakamega County. Mumias was the centre of the Mumias District. The town is linked by road to Kakamega (in east), Busia (west), Bungoma (north), Butere, Luanda, Maseno and Kisumu (south). Two major rivers, River Nzoia and River Lusumu, pass close to the town.

The town has four major hospitals, namely Mumias Level 4 Hospital (the largest), St. Mary's Mission Hospital, Jamia Hospital, and the Mumias Modern Dispensary. The town has a modern bus park and a modern market.

The town hosts the Office of the Member of Parliament for Mumias West and the office of the Deputy County Commissioner. The town has a stadium, Bomani Grounds, used for official meetings, political events, games, and other events.

The collapsed Mumias Sugar Company was a major employer in the region. The company owned the Mumias Sugar FC, which was one of the top football teams in Kenya until it was disbanded in 2007.

Five minutes outside Mumias town, on the road to Kakamega, there is a hospital, St. Mary's Mission Hospital, and a medical college, St. Mary's School of Clinical Medicine. They are run by the Catholic Diocese of Kakamega (Mumias parish), which also sponsors several public primary and secondary schools, namely: St. Mary's Girls High School, St. Anne's Mumias Primary School, St. Peter's Mumias Boys Primary School, and St. Peter's Boys' High School.

== History ==
Mumias is historically associated with the Wanga Kingdom, a traditional polity of the Wanga people, one of the Luhya peoples of western Kenya. The town has served as the political and administrative centre of the Wanga Kingdom, with the Nabongo (king) traditionally serving as its ruler. Historical scholarship describes the Wanga as having developed one of the most centralized political structures among the communities of the Abaluyia, with the Nabongo based at Mumias.

The settlement was formerly known as Lureko (also rendered Elureko). Historical accounts associate the development of the modern town with the relocation of the Wanga administrative centre to Lureko during the reign of Nabongo Mumia's predecessor. The settlement subsequently became an important political and commercial centre and was increasingly associated with Nabongo Mumia, whose name became attached to the town.

Nabongo Mumia Shiundu became ruler of the Wanga in the late 19th century and is generally regarded as one of the most prominent Wanga rulers. His reign coincided with the expansion of British influence in western Kenya. The Wanga established relations with British colonial authorities, and Mumia was subsequently recognized by the colonial administration as a paramount chief. His political position enabled the Wanga leadership to play a significant role in the administration of neighbouring areas during the early colonial period.

Mumia died in 1949 and was succeeded by his son, Nabongo Shitawa. Shitawa was subsequently succeeded by Peter Mumia II, who became the next holder of the Nabongo title. The modern institution of the Nabongo is primarily cultural and traditional rather than a sovereign governmental office, following the incorporation of the Wanga territory into the colonial and, subsequently, Kenyan state structures.

The Wanga royal lineage is associated with the Abashitsetse clan, and traditional institutions continue to play a role in the preservation of Wanga history, genealogy, and cultural practices. The Nabongo and other members of the royal family have continued to participate in cultural activities associated with the Wanga Kingdom.

=== Religion and trade ===
Mumias developed historically as a regional centre of trade and had extensive commercial connections with the Kenyan coast. Arab and Swahili traders established trading links with the Wanga during the 19th century, contributing to the development of Islam in the area. Academic research on the Wanga Muslim community places the introduction of Islam among the Wanga in the late 19th century, when Muslim trading caravans began arriving in Wanga territory.

These contacts contributed to the emergence of a significant Muslim community in Mumias and the surrounding Wanga area. Nabongo Mumia himself converted to Islam, and Muslim traders and religious teachers subsequently played an important role in the spread of Islam in western Kenya. Mumias consequently became an important center of Muslim commercial and religious activity in the region.

Christianity was introduced subsequently through missionary activity. Catholic missionaries established a mission station at Mumias in 1904, while other Christian denominations later established churches and institutions in the town and surrounding areas. Mumias consequently developed a religious landscape comprising Muslim, Catholic, Protestant, Pentecostal and other Christian communities.

=== Wanga cultural heritage ===
The Nabongo Cultural Centre and shrine, located in Matungu near Mumias, was officially opened in 2008. The centre was established to preserve and present the history and cultural heritage of the Wanga Kingdom. It includes a cultural centre, museum, library and royal mausoleum.

The mausoleum contains the graves of several former Wanga rulers, including Nabongo Mumia, Nabongo Shitawa, Nabongo Shiundu and Nabongo Wamukoya. The site also preserves royal regalia, traditional artifacts and other materials associated with Wanga history and cultural practices.

Today, Mumias remains an important cultural centre for the Wanga and a significant urban centre in Kakamega County. Its historical importance derives from its role as the seat of the Wanga political system, its position along historic inland trade routes, and its subsequent development as a centre of agriculture, commerce, religion and administration

== Religion ==
The town has two major religions, Christianity and Islam, although most other religions are found here. There are very many churches in the town and surrounding areas.

The area of Lukoye has a mosque called "Sheik Khalifa Mosque", which was built in 1991 with Kuwaiti assistance. Other mosques have since been set up, such as the one in the Ekero area.

== See also ==
- Charles William Hobley
