= Nabongo Wanga =

Kenyan historical figure and Wanga tribe founder

Nabongo Wanga was the founding father of the today's Wanga subtribe of the Luhya tribe of Kenya. He was born around 1050 A.D. His reign was between 1100 A.D. to his death around 1140 A.D.

== Birth and early life ==
Nabongo Wanga was born in the year 1050 A.D. of King Mwanga III. His early life history goes back to his ancestors who were part of the migration that settled in the Kampala area and formed the Buganda Kingdom. In their culture, it was a belief that a king’s paternal brother or paternal cousin is eligible for succession to the throne and thus he poses a threat to the reigning king. Accordingly, a Baganda prince (omulangira) called Kanyiri, a son of Mawanda of Buganda fled to the Tiriki area in the current Kakamega County (formerly Western Province) of Kenya in the upheaval that followed the murder of his father Mawanda of Buganda by a group of Ganda princes led by his cousin Mwanga I of Buganda. There, Kanyiri became a ruler and was succeeded by his son Wanga.

== Origin of the name Abawanga ==
The name Abawanga is derived from its eponymous founder. It is said that Wanga was a brother to Khaviakala, and that the two brothers disagreed while still in Tiriki over leadership. The reasons for the disagreement remain subject to controversy but what is certain is that following the disagreement, Wanga decided to immigrate from Tiriki and arrived at Imanga. (Note: Imanga is a place situated in between Mumias West Sub County and Musanda in the Western part of Kenya.)

Later at Imanga, it was discovered by Muima Liyai's (the king of Imanga at that time) wife that Wanga was a ruler in disguise. From then henceforth, Wanga was accorded respect and given a place to live. Through his generosity in giving meat and being humane to the local people, Wanga won the loyalty and support of Muima. With time, the people who had benefited from Wanga abandoned tilling land for Muima and swore their allegiance to Wanga and started referring to themselves as "ba Wanga (people of Wanga)." And that is how Abawanga came to be.

== At Imanga ==
When Wanga immigrated from Tiriki to Imanga, he was welcomed by Muima, the then reigning king over the Abamuima clan. The encounter between Wanga and Muima has left a number of questions begging. Although it is certain that the state preceded Wanga in this area, it is still confusing whether the title Nabongo was used by Muima. Initially as mentioned earlier, Wanga disguised himself and worked for Muima while hiding his royal bracelet because it was taboo for a royal member to work for another as a commoner. He received shelter while he herded Muima's cattle and cleaned his kraal.

Wanga was later joined by his people who were searching for him. Among them were the ancestors of the present Abakalibo, Abashikawa, Abakolwe, Ababuka, Abashibe, Abang'ale, Abatsohe and Abarunga. They were all allotted land by Nabongo Muima, Wanga's benefactor. Wanga himself was given land at Eshikulu where one finds Mumias Water Company located today.

== At Eshikulu ==
According to oral traditions, it is said that when Wanga had become powerful and confident and the two bracelets could no longer co-exist in harmony he kidnapped Muima's wife and demanded the latter's milkiest cow as a ransom. Having refused to do as demanded, Muima declared war against Wanga, which he lost . Wanga therefore usurped power from Muima and together with his group established their leadership among the heterogeneous mix of clans that submitted to this authority at Eshikulu.

== At Matungu ==
After taking leadership of his subjects, Wanga crossed the Lusumu River and built a new settlement at Elureko (also Lureko) before moving farther north to Matungu around 1100 A.D. where he died in about 1140 A.D.
