= Kakamega =

- Town
- Location in Kenya Kakamega (Africa)
- Coordinates: 0.28215°N 34.75400°E
- Country: Kenya
- County: Kakamega County
- Elevation: 1,535 m (5,036 ft)

Population (2019 census)
  - Total: 107,227
- Time zone: UTC+3 (EAT)

Kakamega is a town in western Kenya lying about 30 km north of the Equator. It is the headquarters of Kakamega County that has a population of 1,867,579 (2019 census). The town has an urban population of 107,227 (2019 census).

Kakamega is 52 km north of Kisumu, and considered the heart of Luhya land. The average elevation of Kakamega is 1,535 metres.

The county has 12 constituencies in total, namely Butere, Mumias East, Mumias West, Matungu, Khwisero, Shinyalu, Lurambi, ikolomani, Lugari, Malava, Navakholo and Likuyani.

== Naming ==
Kakamega was so named because the word "kakamega(khakhameka)" translates roughly to "to pinch" in Luhya, a tribe occupying the region, which was used to describe how European colonialists would eat the staple food, ugali.

It is often told that Kakamega derives its modern name from the local dialect. The story goes that when European settlers first visited the area now known as Kakamega and were offered Ugali the maize meal, which is the local staple food, called Obusuma in Luhya, and they tried to emulate the eating style for which the tribe was famous. To the hosts though, the visitors were more like ‘pinching’ the Obusuma. The resulting administrative area was named "Kakamega", which roughly translates to ‘to pinch.’ The name is also thought to be from the former Nandi people who inhabited the area prior to the Luhya. There is a tale that the town was originally inhabited by the Nandi, and when the building started swelling, the Nandi called the area “Kokomego” which loosely translate into "there are many buildings", in the Nandi dialect. The new inhabitants took the name and coined it into Kakamega.

== Economics ==
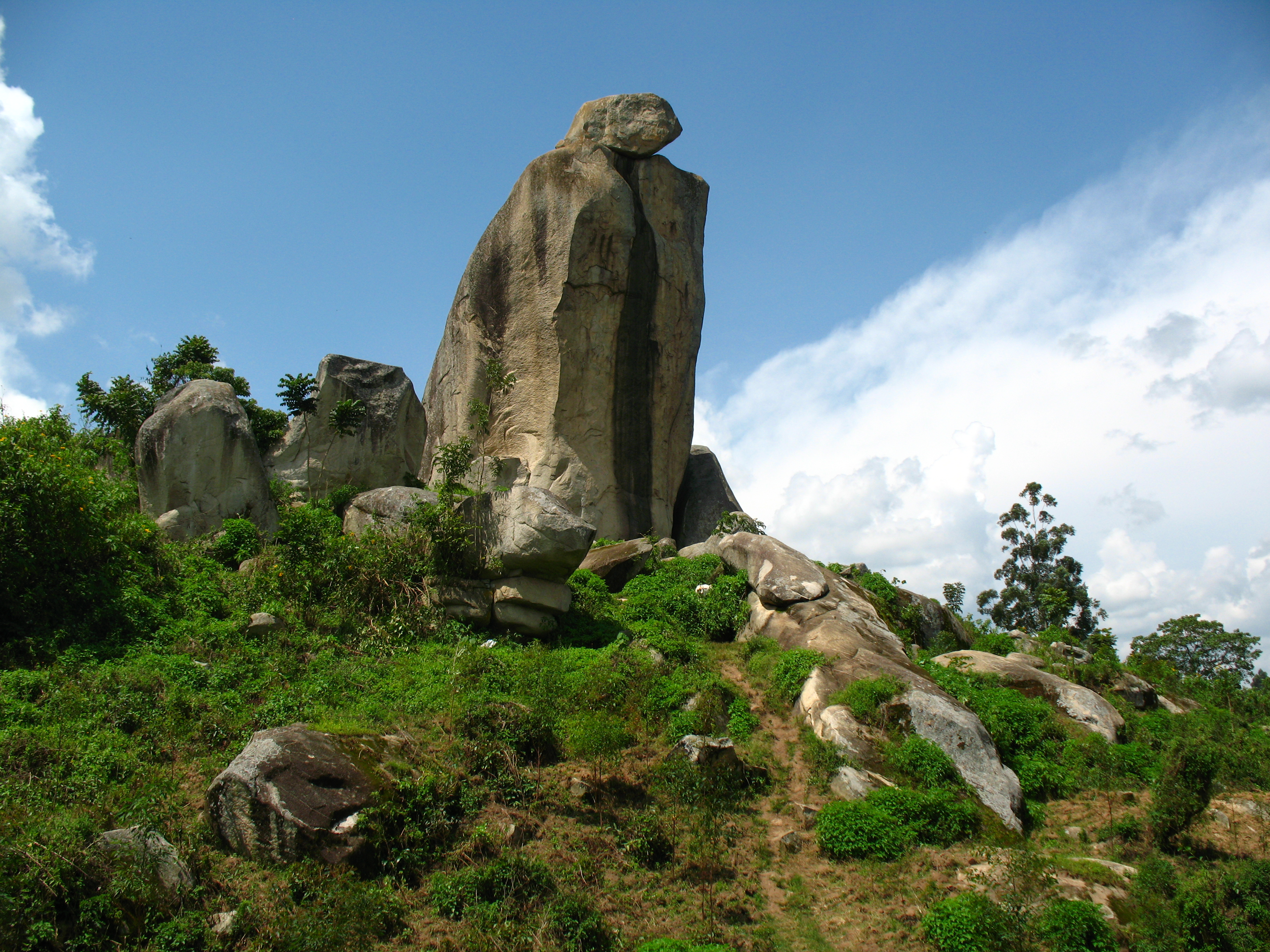
Crying Stone of Ilesi

The local inhabitants are mostly the Luhya tribe, whose main economic activity is mixed farming - cash plus food crop farming and animal rearing.

Kakamega serves as the headquarters of Mumias Sugar, previously Kenya's largest sugar processing company located in the town of Mumias.

It was the scene of the Kakamega gold rush in the early 1930s, fueled partly by the reports of the geologist Albert Ernest Kitson.

Masinde Muliro University of Science and Technology, an institution of higher learning created by an act of parliament in December 2006, is at the heart of Kakamega town, along the Kakamega-Webuye road. It has spur growth in this capital of Western Province.

Kakamega Forest is the main tourist destination in the area. Another attraction used to be the Crying Stone of Ilesi (Ikhongo Murwi) located along the Kisumu-Kakamega highway. It is a 40-metre high rock dome resembling a human figure whose "eyes" used to drop water. There is a myth about this rock with natives who believe that it is an image of a jilted woman who is crying due to being forced out of her matrimonial home and denied access to her children. A hearsay in earlier years goes that the Isukha sub-tribe had wars with Nandi warriors and in most cases they defeated them. The Nandis believed they were defeated by Isukhas due to some superpowers the rock had. The Nandis tried to pull the rock down but they failed and instead, they lost more than 100 of their warriors in the battlefield. Currently, the tourist attraction site is shaded from the roadside view by planted eucalyptus trees which have used up the rock's water and subsequently caused the "Crying Stone" to dry up. This effect is due to the climate change that is being experienced globally. The area used to receive heavy rainfalls in the 1990s and before.

== Administration ==
In 2013, Wycliffe Oparanya was elected as the first Governor of Kakamega County, and retained the seat in the 2017 general elections. In 2022, when the general elections were held, Fernandes Barasa was elected the new governor. Kakamega forms a municipality with ten wards (Amalemba, Bukhulunya, Central, Mahiakalo, Maraba, Matende, Milimani, Musaa, Shibiriri and Sichilayi). All of them belong to Lurambi Constituency, which has a total of fifteen wards. The remaining five are located within Kakamega municipal Council, the rural council of Kakamega District.

== Climate ==
Climate data for Kakamega, elevation 1,530 m (5,020 ft), (1980–2016 normals)
Month	Jan	Feb	Mar	Apr	May	Jun	Jul	Aug	Sep	Oct	Nov	Dec	Year
Mean daily maximum °C (°F)	28.8 (83.8)	29.7 (85.5)	29.4 (84.9)	27.5 (81.5)	26.7 (80.1)	26.3 (79.3)	26.0 (78.8)	26.4 (79.5)	27.2 (81.0)	27.2 (81.0)	27.2 (81.0)	27.9 (82.2)	27.5 (81.6)
Daily mean °C (°F)	21.4 (70.5)	22.1 (71.8)	22.2 (72.0)	21.4 (70.5)	20.9 (69.6)	20.3 (68.5)	19.9 (67.8)	20.1 (68.2)	20.5 (68.9)	20.9 (69.6)	20.9 (69.6)	21.1 (70.0)	21.0 (69.8)
Mean daily minimum °C (°F)	14.0 (57.2)	14.4 (57.9)	15.0 (59.0)	15.3 (59.5)	15.0 (59.0)	14.2 (57.6)	13.8 (56.8)	13.8 (56.8)	13.7 (56.7)	14.5 (58.1)	14.6 (58.3)	14.2 (57.6)	14.4 (57.9)
Average precipitation mm (inches)	74.6 (2.94)	73.2 (2.88)	172.5 (6.79)	275.9 (10.86)	252.8 (9.95)	173.2 (6.82)	150.7 (5.93)	213.0 (8.39)	172.5 (6.79)	164.2 (6.46)	152.4 (6.00)	90.7 (3.57)	1,965.7 (77.38)
Source: World Meteorological Organization (precipitation 1988–2018)

== Rainforest ==
The Kakamega area receives a very high amount of annual precipitation and contains Kakamega Forest, a preserve which is a remnant of a rainforest that once stretched west through Uganda.

Because it is a rainforest, the canopy of the trees has grown into a thin mesh of interlocking top branches that block most sunlight from reaching the ground below, resulting in little undergrowth. With few bushes along the darkened forest floor, the main obstacle is ancient fallen tree trunks blocking the paths between the standing trees. The German-funded project BIOTA East has been working in the forest since 2001 to perform forest inventories for all sorts of life forms with the aim of discovering strategies for a sustainable use of the forest.

More than 400 species of birds have been found in the Kakamega rainforest. The many songbirds fill the air with various birdcalls.

Kakamega is also home to Africa's largest and most aggressive cobra, the Kakamega forest cobra. Reputed by locals to spend much time in the trees, stories abound of fearsome attacks on unsuspecting passersby. Other snakes in the area include the forest adder, black mamba, and the green mamba.

== Education ==
Tertiary Education

Kakamega is home to Masinde Muliro University of Science and Technology, located along Kakamega-Webuye road. The campus offers courses in Engineering, Computer Science, Education, Disaster Management, Journalism and Mass Communication, Science, Nursing, Criminology subjects. The Shamberere Technical Training Institute is also local.

Primary and Secondary education

Majority of primary and secondary schools in Kakamega are government owned. Kakamega primary is the major primary school and is located in the town's CBD. Private schools renowned nationally located in the town include: Kakamega Hill School and St Joseph's primary school.

The town also hosts one national secondary school, Kakamega High School and many other secondary schools.

Library services

The town hosts one library set up by the Kenya National Library Service.
