= Kakamega County =

Coordinates: 0.283333°N 34.75°E

- County
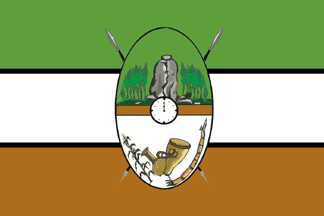
- Flag

- Location in Kenya
- Country: Kenya
- Formed: 4 March 2013
- Capital: Kakamega

Government
  - Governor: Fernandes Barasa

Area
  - Total: 3,033.8 km^{2} (1,171.4 sq mi)

Population (2019)
  - Total: 1,867,579
  - Density: 615.59/km^{2} (1,594.4/sq mi)

GDP (PPP)
  - GDP: ▲$6.436 billion (11th)(2022)
  - Per capita: ▲$3,272 (2022) (32nd)

GDP (NOMINAL)
  - GDP: ▲$2.363 billion (2022) (11th)
  - Per capita: ▲$2,046 (2022) (32nd)
- Time zone: UTC+3 (EAT)
- Website: kakamega.go.ke

Kakamega County is a county in the former Western Province of Kenya. It borders Vihiga County to the South, Siaya County to the West, Bungoma and Trans Nzoia counties to the North and Nandi, and Uasin Gishu counties to the East. Its capital and largest town is Kakamega. The county has a population of 1,867,579, and an area of 3,033.8 km^{2}.

== Physical and topical features ==
Kakamega County has an altitude ranging from 1,240 metres to 2,000 metres above sea level. The southern part of the county is hilly and made of granites which raises it 1950m above sea level. The Nandi Escarpment is a key feature on the eastern border of the county with steep cliffs rising from 1700m to 2000m. The county is also endowed with a number of hills like Misango, Imanga, Eregi, Butieri, Sikhokhochole, Mawe Tatu, Lirhanda, Kiming’ini hills among others.

== Climatic conditions ==
Rainfall is almost uniformly distributed in many parts of the county throughout the year with March and July receiving highest whereas December and February the least.

The county has annual rainfall that range from 1280.1 mm to 2214.1 mm per year. The temperature range is 18 °C to 29 °C with the hottest months being are January, February, March and on the others side June, July and August being the coldest.

== Demographics ==
As per 2019 census Kakamega county had a total population of 1,867,579 people, of which 897,133 are males, 970,406 being females and 40 intersex persons. There are 433,207 households with an average size of 4.3 persons per household and a population density of 618 people per square kilometre.

Distribution of Population by Sex and Sub-County
Sub-county	Male	Female	Intersex	Total
Butere	73,634	80,463	3	154,100
Kakamega Central	92,774	95,432	6	188,212
Kakamega East	80,553	86,784	4	167,641
Kakamega North	115,511	122,814	5	238,330
Kakamega South	53219	58,524		111,743
Khwisero	53,670	59,803	3	113,476
Likuyani	73,710	78,341	4	152,055
Lugari	59,135	63,593		122,728
Matete	31,749	34,423		66,172
Matungu	78,793	88,143	4	166,940
Mumias East	55,895	60,953	3	116,851
Mumias West	54,915	60,438	1	115,354
Navakholo	73,275	80,695	7	153,977
Total	897,133	970,406	40	1,867,579

=== Religion ===
Religion in Kakamega County

Religion (2019 Census)	Number
Catholicism	306,477
Protestant	598,611
Evangelical Churches	566,271
African Instituted Churches	216,915
Orthodox	6,837
Other Christian	46,594
Islam	88,412
Hindu	578
Traditionists	3,002
Other	17,491
No Religion / Atheists	8,575
Don't Know	1,277
Not Stated	292

== Administrative and political units ==
=== Administrative units ===
Administration wise, the county is divided into twelve sub counties, sixty county assembly wards, eighty three locations, two hundred and fifty sub-locations, one hundred and eighty seven Village Units and four hundred Community Administrative Areas. Politically, it comprises twelve constituencies and sixty wards.

==== Constituencies ====
The county has twelve constituencies (2013):

- Lugari Constituency
- Likuyani Constituency
- Malava Constituency
- Lurambi Constituency
- Navakholo Constituency
- Mumias West Constituency
- Mumias East Constituency
- Matungu Constituency
- Butere Constituency
- Khwisero Constituency
- Shinyalu Constituency
- Ikolomani Constituency

The Mumias Constituency was divided into Mumias West and Mumias East.

=== Political leadership ===
The governor is Fernandes Barasa and is deputised by Ayub Savula. He has been governor since 2022, following the end of Wycliffe Oparanya's second and final term in office. Boni Khalwale is the senator and joined office in 2022 after defeating Brian Lishenga. Elsie Busihile Muhanda is the women representative and joined the office in 2017 after defeating Rachel Amamo who was the first elected women representative 2013–2017.

For Kakamega County, the County Executive Committee comprises:-

County Executive Committee
	Number
The Governor	1
The Deputy Governor	1
The County Secretary	1
The CEC Members	10
Total	13

== Education ==
There are 1631 ECD centres 1136 primary schools and 408 secondary schools. The county has also 4 teachers training colleges, 51 Youth Polytechnics, 3 technical training institutes, 6 university campuses and 1 university as of 2014.

Education Institutions in Kakamega County 2014
Category	Public	Private	Total	Enrolment
ECD Centres	876	855	1631	105,426
Primary schools	883	253	1136	557,107
Secondary schools	408		408	116,732
Youth Polytechnics	47	4	51	
Technical Training Institutes	3		0	2381
University Campuses	5	1	6	10,657
Universities	1	0	1	10,657
Adult Education Centres	195	0	195	16,542

== Health ==
Kakamega has one county referral hospital (Kakamega County General Teaching & Referral Hospital), 12 sub-county hospitals, 47 health centres, 123 dispensaries and 44 clinics. Both private and public health facilities hold a total bed capacity of 3,949 with public sector having 2,338 beds and private hospitals 197 beds and mission/NGO is 1,414 beds capacity.

HIV prevalence in Kakamega County is 4.0% lower than the national one that is at 5.9%.

Health Facilities by Ownership
	Government	*FBO	Private	NGO	TOTAL
Hospitals	12	4	0	0	16
Health centres	38	9	0	0	9
Dispensaries	95	10	18	0	123
Clinics	0	1	43	0	43

- FBO – Faith Based Organizations

== Trade and commerce ==
The county is part of the Lake Region Economic Bloc (LREB) established in 2018 to foster regional economic, industrial, social, and technological collaboration.

There are 62 trading centres, 11,083 retail traders, 21 supermarkets, 203 wholesale traders and 1180 registered hotels.

== Agriculture ==
Agriculture is the backbone of the county, contributing to 65% of the county's GDP.

There are two main categories of crops: food crops and cash crops, the rest being horticulture. Food crops include maize, sorghum, finger millet, rice, beans, peas, grams, cassava, potatoes, and arrowroots. Maize is grown all over the county and forms the county's staple food. Sugarcane is partly a popular food crop but also one of the most grown cash crops. There has been however a reduced sugarcane farming attributed to collapse of Mumias Sugar and the recent financial woes facing sugarcane millers which have discouraged its growing.

== Transport and communication ==
The county is covered by 4,451.3 km of road network. of this 1,308.90 km is covered by earth surface, 2,792.25 is covered by gravel, 939.32 km is murram surface and 307.5 km is covered by bitumen.

There are 14 Post Offices with 8,400 installed letter boxes, 6,969 rented letter boxes and 1,431 vacant letter boxes.

== Sports ==
Kakamega is known for its prowess in sporting activities, especially rugby and football. Highschool football teams such as Musingu High School, Kakamega High school, Shanderema High, Archbishop Njenga Girls have dominated in national high school games and East African competitions. Rugby teams from Koyonzo High School, St. Peter's Mumias, Kakamega High School have been among the best in the country. Both have been making headlines in highschool competitions, competing up to the East African regional levels consecutively. Rugby teams like Kabras RFC, Masinde Muliro Rugby teams being some of the big names in Kenyan local rugby. They are based in Kakamega. The county has also produced sportsmen who have represented Kenya's national teams in their respective fields. Notable among them include Edith Wisa, Dorcas Sikobe, Victor Wanyama, Clifton Miheso, having been born there or some of whom trace their roots to Kakamega.

== Services and urbanisation ==
Stats for Kakamega County
County	Stats for the County (Per cent)
Urbanisation	15.2
Literacy	72.7
Attending School (15–18 Yrs)	76.3
Paved Roads	4.9
Good Roads	54.1
Electricity Access	5.6
Poverty Rate	53
Stats for the County

Source: USAid Kenya

== Villages and settlements ==
- Butsotso
- Emasatsi
- Ivakale
- Kilingili
- Kiming'ini
- Masati
- Mureko
- Nanyeni
- Eregi

== See also ==
- Mwale Medical and Technology City
