= Hamisi Constituency =

Constituency in Vihiga County, Kenya

Hamisi
- constituency for the Parliament of Kenya
- Hamisi Constituency within Vihiga County

- Vihiga County within Kenya
- County: Vihiga
- Population: 159,241
- Area: 157 km^{2} (60.6 sq mi)

Current constituency
- Number of members: 1
- Party: ANC
- Member of Parliament: Charles Gimose
- Wards: 7

Tiriki or Hamisi is home to the Tiriki subtribe of the Abaluyia. Hamisi Constituency is an electoral constituency in Kenya. It is one of five constituencies in Vihiga County. Hamisi Constituency includes seven electoral wards: Shiru Ward, Gisambai Ward, Shamakhokho Ward, Banja Ward, Muhudu Ward, Tambua ward, and Jepkoyai Ward. It has a population of 159,241 people.

== History ==
The name Hamisi refers to Hamisi Division or sub-county of Vihiga County which is overseen by a District Officer. The name Hamisi also refers to Hamisi constituency which is represented in the Kenya National Assembly by a Member of Parliament. The name Hamisi also refers to the Administrative Capital of Hamisi Constituency where majority of government offices in the Division are located. The name Hamisi itself was derived from a trader who run a shop in the area from the early days of colonialism. The typical way the Tiriki refer to Hamisi is "Wa-Hamisi" which means the place of Hamisi.

== Administrative ==
Tiriki is located in the Republic of Kenya in Vihiga County. Vihiga County is one of the five counties that formed the former Western Province. The other counties in the former Western Province are Kakamega (which Vihiga was previously a part of), Bungoma, and Busia. Trans-Nzoia County is located in the former Rift Valley but has a majority Abaluyia population. Nandi County in the former Rift Valley province also has a sizable but minority Abaluyia population.

== Agriculture ==
The main cash crop is tea, which is grown at higher altitudes in the region. Other crops are maize, millet, bananas, avocado, papaya, sweet potatoes and cassava. The inhabitants also rear cattle, goats, sheep and chickens.

== Religion ==
Hamisi is headquarters to four main Christian Churches; the Pentecostal Assemblies of God (PAG) at Nyang'ori, Friends' Church (Quackers) at Kaimosi, the African Divine Church at Boyani near Gamalenga and Israel (Nineve) Church at Jebrok. The prevalence of religious activities has not reduced undesirable delinquencies in this region. Literacy rates are above Kenyan Rural average; but a serious lack of educational tools to push this resource to the next level is the main challenge.

== Demographics ==
Kaimosi, one of the notable towns in Hamisi, has been a major attraction to international visitors who come as students, Peace Corps volunteers, and missionaries. Some of the major schools in Hamisi are Kaimosi High Schools for boys and girls, Kaimosi Teachers College, Friends College Kaimosi, Kaimosi Special School, Kaimosi Friends Primary School and Kaimosi Friends University College. Another attraction is the "Hill of Vision" or Javujiluachi in local dialect, Tiriki.

Unlike many other communities, the Tiriki have been able to preserve major aspects of their cultural heritage including their age group initiation rituals and rites.

Unemployment patterns in Hamisi mirror those of other similar areas in rural Kenya. Employment levels are low because of low agricultural production and an absence of other sectors such as manufacturing, retail, or transportation.

== Politicians ==
The current Member of Parliament for Hamisi is Charles Gumini Gimose of Amani National Coalition(ANC). The former Member George Khaniri inherited the seat from his father, Nicodemus Khaniri, who died of a heart attack in 1994 as he was opening the new residence of a constituent, Dr. Tom Mulusa.

== Notable persons ==
- Daudi Kabaka - musician
- Cyrus Jirongo - politician and co-founder of Youth For Kanu in 1992
- Adema Sangale, former CEO of Proctor and Gamble East Africa
