= 2013 Busia local elections =

Local elections in Kenya

Local elections were held in Busia County to elect a Governor and County Assembly on 4 March 2013. Under the new constitution, which was passed in a 2010 referendum, the 2013 general elections were the first in which Governors and members of the County Assemblies for the newly created counties were elected. They will also be the first general elections run by the Independent Electoral and Boundaries Commission(IEBC) which has released the official list of candidates.

== Gubernatorial election ==
Candidate	Running Mate	Coalition	Party	Votes
Esyepet, Vincent Sidai	Baraza, Austen Omonyo		United Democratic Forum Party	--
Imo, Philemon Lameck	Oyatsi, Francis Lawrence		FORD–Kenya	--
Ojaamongson, Sospeters Odeke	Wangalwa, Kizito Osore	Cord	Orange Democratic Movement	--
Okwara, Benjamin Onyango	Wandrea, Samuel		Safina	--
Were, Alice Betty	Ongaro, Stephen Lulalire		Labour Party	--

== Prospective candidates ==
The following are some of the candidates who have made public their intentions to run:

- Philemon Imo
- Sospeter Ojaamong
- Vincent Sidai
- Kizito Wangalwa
