= Matayos =

- Location within Kenya
- Coordinates: 0.36°N 34.17°E
- Country: Kenya
- County: Busia County
- Elevation: 1,214 m (3,983 ft)
  - Density: 1,000/km^{2} (2,600/sq mi)
- Time zone: UTC+3 (EAT)

Matayos (also Matayo's) is a settlement in the Busia County of Kenya's former Western Province. Matayos is a small township of about two thousand inhabitants along the B1 road (Kisumu-Busia Highway), sixteen kilometres from the Busia border point, and about two kilometres east of the Sio River bridge. Matayos Division, whose seat is at Matayos centre is a very small borough covering the stretch of about twenty-two kilometres from Korinda junction near Busia town at its extreme west-point to the Rakite stream depression near Bumala junction to the east. The division is home to about eighty-thousand people.

== Location ==
Matayos is a cross-roads trading centre, formed from the confluence of dirt-roads that serve the hinter-regions of Funyula, Mulwanda, Namboboto to the south, and eLugulu, Nasewa sugar-belt and Nambale district headquarters to the north. Matayos township at Lwanya area is the administrative seat of Matayos Division in Busia County, which has three locations: Nasewa, Lwanya and Nangoma, and has been administered by a divisional officer continuously since the year 1990, when it was carved by presidential decree out of the larger Nambale Division of the former Busia District. Matayos is well served by streams and bisected by the River Sio as it flows form Mount Elgon toward Lake Victoria. Matayos is hilly to the south-east, with the land generally slanting to its lowest points in the Sio swamp, and rising again as it sprawls towards the international border with Uganda.

== Name ==
The name Matayos is an offshoot of colonial Christian influences. Elderly residents recount that the man whose land was transformed into the public forum (baraza) seat of the colonial Chief's, was named Matayo, baptized as such by Italian missionaries of the early 20th century.

== Religion ==
A contested base for both the Church Missionary Society and the Roman Catholic Church, Matayos area retains schools and other symbols of the two Christian sects. The Catholics run their affairs from the eastern end at Lwanya, while the Anglicans have made Busende to the west their local fiefdom. The township is therefore known by its English rendition, as Matayo's market, later turned into Matayos, much in the same sense as Mumias town was derived from Nabongo Mumia's base at Elureko.

== Economy ==
With the establishment of farmers co-operatives in the 1950s and sixties, Matayos was one of the early townships to host a cotton seed distribution store and a milk-collection centre.

The inhabitants of Matayos are subsistence farmers who mainly grow cassava, white and yellow (Nyayo) maize, sweet potatoes, ground nuts, soya beans, sorghum, finger millet, yams, bananas and beans on small pieces of land, usually an acre or less. They raise livestock on a similarly small scale, mainly cattle which act as draught animals for ploughing purposes, some goats, sheep, and usually some free-range chickens.the area also grow cash crop such as sugarcane farming in Busibwabo and Nasewa area . Matayos area has been rapidly influenced by national economic and development policy, with efforts aimed at literacy, basic healthcare and water provision. There has been sustained effort by the Constituency Development Fund (CDF) of the national government to develop and equip schools, provide piped water and supply drugs at country referral hospital and local health centre i.e. Matayos health centre and Nasewa health centre and five working dispensaries, matayos health centre one of the oldest in the country.

Located some sixteen kilometers away from the international border, blessed with an abundance of construction materials (sand from the Sio and stones from the Nangoma, Ganjala, Odiado hills) and served by one of Kenya's main highways, Matayos was viewed as a favorite place to become the headquarter of Busia, away from the insecurity and hustle-and-bustle of the Busia border town.

== Education ==
The area has 13 public secondary schools and more than thirty primary schools three village polytechnics, all run by the government.

== Notable residents ==
In national affairs, Matayos has produced several public figures, including the longest-serving former Attorney-General of Kenya, Amos Wako.
