= List of Friends schools =

Friends schools are institutions that provide an education based on the beliefs and testimonies of the Religious Society of Friends, known as Quakers.

Friends schools vary greatly, both in their interpretation of Quaker principles and in how they relate to formal organizations that make up the Society of Friends. Most Friends schools are similar in their mission however: to provide an academically sound education while also instilling values of community, spirituality, responsibility and stewardship in their students.

Some institutions founded by Friends were never formally "Quaker schools". Some historically Friends institutions are no longer formally associated with the Society of Friends. Those that continue to call themselves "Quaker schools" may have formal oversight from a Friends yearly or monthly meeting (often called coming "under care of" a meeting), and others are governed by members of the Society of Friends and/or adhere to aspects of Quaker practice.

Because of the wide range of Friends, the branch (or branches) of Quakerism with which the school affiliates are included, and where applicable the Yearly, Quarterly or Monthly Meeting under whose care or governance the school is held is shown.

The following is a list of schools currently or historically associated with the Society of Friends, regardless of their current degree of affiliation:

== Australia ==
- The Friends' School, Hobart, in Hobart, Tasmania: PreK–12th grade, founded by Quakers in 1887 and governed by Quaker principles. The majority of the school governors are appointed by Australia Yearly Meeting, mostly from the Tasmania Regional Meeting; the Hobart local Meeting House is adjacent to school grounds.

== Belize ==
- Belize Friends School, Belize City, (formerly known as Belize Friends Boys School) supported by Friends United Meeting

== Bolivia ==
Bolivian Friends have established several schools, which are supported from the United States by the Bolivian Quaker Education Fund.

== Canada ==
- Argenta Friends School, Argenta, British Columbia, defunct
- Pickering College, Newmarket, Ontario, PreK–12th grade, founded as a Quaker school, "not a Quaker school today"

== Costa Rica ==
- Monteverde Friends School, Monteverde, PreK–12th grade, under care of Monteverde Monthly Meeting (Friends General Conference)

== El Salvador ==
- Instituto Teológico de los Amigos de El Salvador, San Salvador, El Salvador, a ministerial training institute under the care of Iglesia de los Amigos en El Salvador

== Honduras ==
- Instituto Biblico Jorge Fox, San Marcos Ocotepeque, Honduras, a ministerial training institute under the care of Junta Annual Amigos de Honduras

== Ireland ==
- Drogheda Grammar School, Drogheda, Co. Meath (Louth), trustees are mostly members of the Society of Friends, not formally under care of a meeting
- Newtown Junior School,
- Newtown School, Waterford, Ireland
- Rathgar Junior School

== Jamaica ==
- Happy Grove High School, Hectors River, founded by Quakers, now operated by the Jamaican government

== Japan ==
- Friends School, Tokyo, Japan, founded by Quaker missionaries, now independent of specific meeting care, but run on Friends principles

== Kenya ==
All Quaker schools and yearly meetings in Kenya are affiliated with Friends United Meeting. Note that the Friends World Committee for Consultation counts, but does not name, many more Kenyan Friends schools than are listed here,

- Chavakali High School, Kenya
- Friends' Primary School, Mudete, Kenya
- Friends' School, Kamusinga, Kenya
- Friends' School, Kigama, Kenya
- Musingu high school, Kenya
- lugulu girls, Kenya
- Friends Theological College, Kaimoisi, Kenya
- Friends University Kamoisi Kaimosi, Kenya

== Lebanon ==
- Brummana High School, in Brummana, Lebanon; founded by Theophilus Waldmeier and Cybil & Eli Jones in 1873; it remains in the Friends tradition, managed by British Quakers, serving a wide area of the Middle East

== Palestine ==
- Ramallah Friends Schools, West Bank

== United Kingdom ==
=== Secondary schools ===
- Ackworth School, near Pontefract, England; "founded in 1779 by John Fothergill on behalf of The Religious Society of Friends... the School Committee is still accountable to this body"
- Bootham School, York, England (1822); majority of School Committee is appointed by Quakers in Yorkshire, formerly Yorkshire Quarterly Meeting
- Breckenbrough School, near Thirsk, England (1934); residential school for boys with behavioral and emotional conditions; a "registered charitable trust school with a Quaker... trusteeship"
- Friends' School Lisburn, Lisburn, Northern Ireland, founded in 1774, majority of trustees represent Ulster Quarterly Meeting
- Leighton Park School, Reading, England; a Friends boarding and day school; founded in 1890 in part to replace Grove House School in Tottenham, London
- The Mount School, York, England (1785), a Friends school for girls, founded by Yorkshire Quakers
- Sibford School, near Banbury, England (1842), a Friends school, originally founded for the children of Quakers who 'married outside'
- Sidcot School, near Weston-super-Mare, England, "founded in 1699 and administered on the Quaker principles of truth, integrity, respect, simplicity, equality, and sustainability". The current institution was (re)founded in 1808.

Non-Friends schools with Friends connections

- St Christopher School, Letchworth, England, founded by Theosophists and never under care of the Society of Friends, but operated 1925–1980 by the Harris family, who were Quakers

Defunct Friends schools

- Great Ayton Friends' School, England, founded as a school for students whose parents had been disowned by Friends meetings for "marrying out" of meeting, became a general Friends school after 1854, became formally disassociated with Friends in 1991 as "Ayton School", and closed in 1997
- Newington Academy for Girls, Stoke Newington, then just north of London; founded in 1824 by William Allen
- Stramongate School, Kendal, Westmorland (as it was then), operated 1698–1932
- Wennington School, England, closed 1975
- Wigton School, Brookfield, Wigton, England, closed 1984
- Friends' School, Saffron Walden, England, (known as Walden School in 2016–17) the oldest Friends School, was founded in 1702, under the care of Britain Yearly Meeting which indirectly appointed the school's Board of Governors through the Friends' School Saffron Walden General Meeting The school closed at the end of the summer term, 2017.

=== Other institutions ===
- Woodbrooke Quaker Study Centre, adult study centre for United Kingdom Quakers
- Friends' Schools' Council, group established to support Quakers in education.

== United States ==
Abbreviations:

- CYM: Central Yearly Meeting of Friends
- EFCI: Evangelical Friends Church International
- FGC: Friends General Conference
- FUM: Friends United Meeting
- NEYM: New England Yearly Meeting
- PYM: Philadelphia Yearly Meeting

=== Higher education ===
- Barclay College, Haviland, Kansas, associated with Friends Church, "an evangelical Friends school which accepts and embraces persons with evangelical Christian beliefs from a variety of denomination backgrounds"
- Bryn Mawr College, Bryn Mawr, Pennsylvania, founded as a Quaker institution, now non-denominational
- Cornell University, founded by Friends, but always non-denominational
- Duke University, the founding organization, the Union Institute Society was a group of Methodists and Quakers.
- Earlham College, Richmond, Indiana, affiliated with Western Yearly Meeting (FUM)
- Earlham School of Religion, Richmond, Indiana, associated with FUM, but has relations with all branches of the Society of Friends
- Friends University, Wichita, Kansas, founded as a Quaker institution, now non-denominational with "an amicable but independent relationship with the Society of Friends" (EFCI)
- George Fox University, Newberg, Oregon, affiliated with Northwest Yearly Meeting of Friends (EFCI)
- Global College, founded as Friends World College by New York Yearly Meeting (Friends General Conference), now part of Long Island University and unaffiliated with Friends
- Guilford College, Greensboro, North Carolina, founded as a Quaker college; draws on Quaker traditions, but has no formal affiliation
- Haverford College, Haverford, Pennsylvania; founded by members of the PYM, became part of the Orthodox PYM after the Hicksite-Orthodox schism; remains rooted in Friends tradition and grounded in Quaker practice, but without formal affiliation
- Houston Graduate School of Theology, Houston, Texas, "identifies with the Quaker movement", grounded in Evangelical Friends theology and practice
- Johns Hopkins University, Baltimore, Maryland, founded by a Quaker and most early trustees were Quaker, but was always officially non-denominational
- Malone University, Canton, Ohio, sponsored by Evangelical Friends Church – Eastern Region (EFCI)
- Pacific Oaks College, Pasadena, California, graduate school of education based around a children's school founded by Quakers; strong Friends influence but no formal affiliation
- Swarthmore College, Swarthmore, Pennsylvania, founded by Hicksite PYM, now independent
- Union Bible College, Westfield, Indiana, founded by Orthodox CYM
- Whittier College, Whittier, California, founded by Quakers, now secular and independent with "an appreciation for Quaker values"
- William Penn University, Oskaloosa, Iowa, founded by Quakers, no formal affiliation; "The university is firmly rooted in its Christian heritage with certain characteristics distinctive to Quakers, but welcomes faculty, staff and students from all faiths."
- Wilmington College, Wilmington, Ohio, founded by Quakers, associated with Wilmington Yearly Meeting (FUM)

The athletic teams of the University of Pennsylvania are referred to as the Quakers, and the university is in Philadelphia, the historic center of American Quakerism, but it is not a Quaker institution, nor was it historically.

=== Secondary (high) schools ===
"Independent Quaker schools" are operated using Quaker principles and often include a majority of Quakers among trustees, but are not formally under care of a meeting.

- Abington Friends School, Abington, Pennsylvania, grades preK–12, under care of Abington Monthly Meeting, PYM (FGC)
- Arthur Morgan School, Celo, North Carolina, grades 7–9, independent Quaker school
- Brooklyn Friends School, Brooklyn, New York City, grades preK–12, independent Quaker school
- Carolina Friends School, Durham, North Carolina, grades preK–12, independent Quaker school
- Delaware Valley Friends School, Paoli, Pennsylvania, specializing in students with learning differences, grades 7–12, under the care of Philadelphia Quarterly Meeting, PYM (FGC)
- Friends Academy, Locust Valley, New York, independent PreK–12 Quaker school
- Friends Bible Training School, Kotzebue, Alaska, supported by Alaska Yearly Meeting (EFCI)
- Friends' Bloomingdale Academy, Bloomingdale, Indiana (1846–1916)
- Friends' Central School, Wynnewood, Pennsylvania, grades preK–12, independent Quaker school
- Friends Meeting School Ijamsville, Frederick County, Maryland, grades K–12, independent Quaker school
- Friends School of Baltimore, Baltimore, Maryland, grades preK–12. Pre-preschool options are available as well, known as Baby Friends and Little Friends, which offer daycare for children ages 3 and under. Additionally, it is now an independent Quaker school, but maintains historic ties to Baltimore Monthly Meeting, Stony Run, Baltimore Yearly Meeting (FGC)
- Friends Select School, Philadelphia, Pennsylvania, grades preK–12, under care of Central Philadelphia Monthly Meeting (Race Street) and the Monthly Meeting of Friends of Philadelphia (Arch Street), both PYM (FGC)
- Friends Seminary, New York City, New York, grades K–12, under care of New York Quarterly Meeting, New York Yearly Meeting (FGC)
- George School, Newtown, Pennsylvania, grades 9–12, independent; board is self-perpetuating by approval of PYM (FGC)
- Germantown Friends School, Philadelphia, Pennsylvania, grades preK–12, under care of Germantown Monthly Meeting, PYM (FGC)
- Greenleaf Friends Academy, Greenleaf, Idaho, grades K–12, independent, but affiliated with Northwest Yearly Meeting (EFCI)
- Lincoln School, Providence, Rhode Island, girls grades PreK–12, independent Quaker school

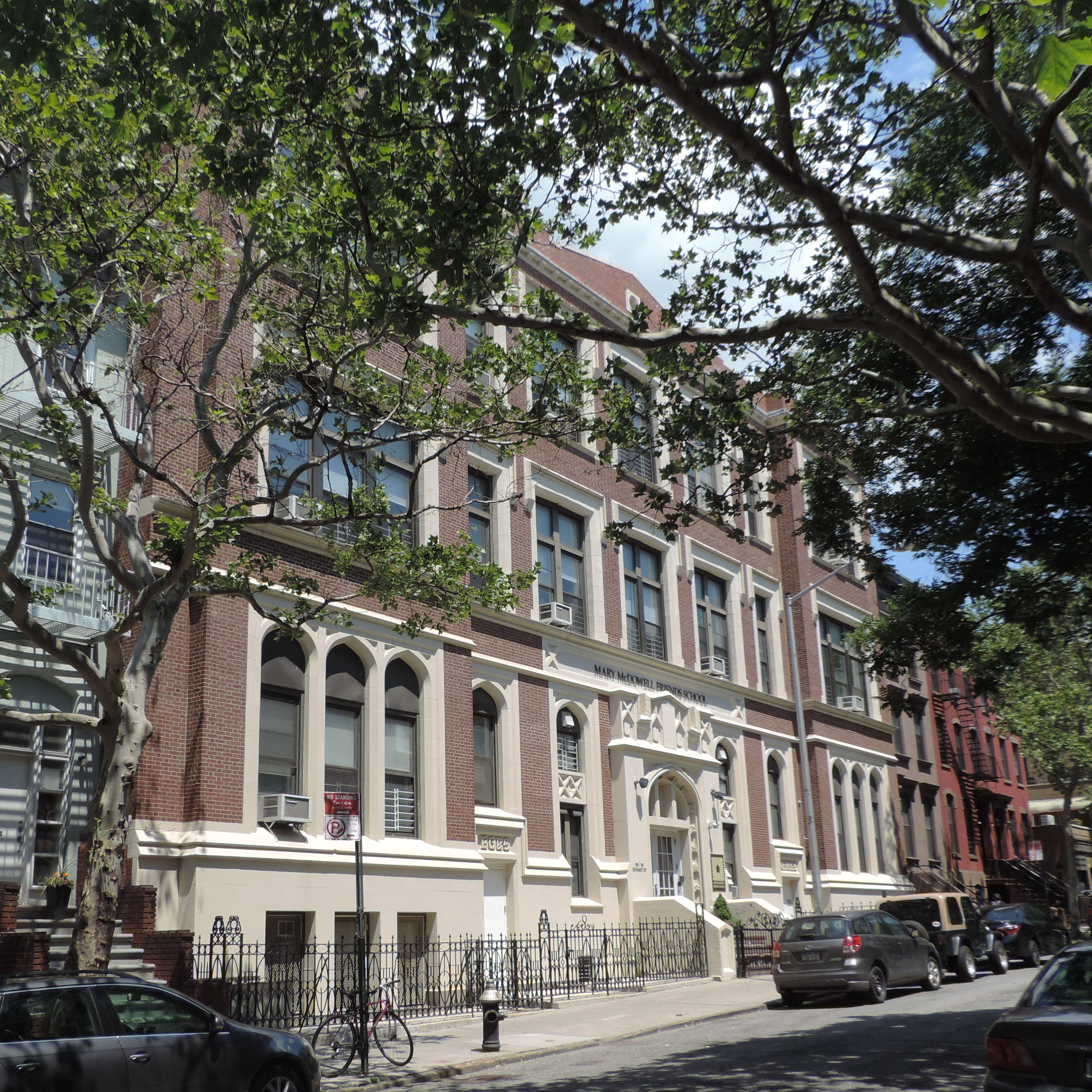
Mary McDowell school, Brooklyn

- Mary McDowell Friends School, Brooklyn, New York City, specializing in students with learning disabilities, preK-12, independent Quaker school
- The Meeting School, Rindge, New Hampshire, formerly an independent Quaker school for grades 9–12; closed in 2011
- Moorestown Friends School, Moorestown, New Jersey, grades PreK–12, Independent, affiliated with Moorestown Monthly Meeting, PYM (FGC)
- Moses Brown School, Providence, Rhode Island, grades preK–12, under care of NEYM (FGC/FUM)
- New Garden Friends School, Greensboro, North Carolina, grades preK–12, independent Quaker school
- Oakwood Friends School, Poughkeepsie, New York, independent grades 6–12 Quaker school
- Olney Friends School, Barnesville, Ohio, grades 9–12, independent Quaker school formerly under the care of Ohio Yearly Meeting (Conservative Friends)
- Portland Friends School, Portland, Oregon, grades preK–12
- Sandy Spring Friends School, Sandy Spring, Maryland, preK–12, under the care of Sandy Spring Monthly Meeting, Baltimore Yearly Meeting (FGC)
- Scattergood Friends School, West Branch, Iowa, grades 6–12, owned and operated by Iowa Yearly Meeting of Friends (Conservative Friends)
- Sidwell Friends School, Washington, DC, grades preK–12, independent Quaker school
- Tandem Friends School, Charlottesville, Virginia, grades 5–12, independent Quaker school
- Virginia Beach Friends School, Virginia Beach, Virginia, grades preK–12, independent Quaker school
- Union Bible Academy, Westfield, Indiana, founded by Orthodox CYM
- Wellsprings Friends School, Eugene, Oregon, grades 9–12, independent Quaker school, Northern Pacific Yearly Meeting
- Westtown School, Westtown Township, Pennsylvania, PreK–12 independent Quaker School associated with PYM (FGC)
- Wilmington Friends School, Wilmington, Delaware, grades preK–12, independent but affiliated with Wilmington Monthly Meeting, PYM (FGC)
- William Penn Charter School, Philadelphia, Pennsylvania, grades preK–12, independent Quaker school associated with PYM; oldest Quaker school in the world, founded in 1689.
- Woolman Semester, Nevada City, California, one-semester program open to grades 11–13, formerly John Woolman School

=== Lower and middle schools ===
Note: This section lists schools with grades only below 9th grade. Schools including high school grades are listed above.

- Buckingham Friends School, Lahaska, Pennsylvania, grades K–8, under care of Buckingham Monthly Meeting, PYM (FGC)
- Cambridge Friends School Cambridge, Massachusetts, grades preK–8, under care of Friends Meeting at Cambridge, NEYM (FGC/FUM)
- Chappaqua Friends Nursery School, Chappaqua, New York, PreK
- Chicago Friends School, Chicago, Illinois, K–8
- Concord Friends Nursery School, Concordville, Pennsylvania, PreK
- Connecticut Friends School, Wilton, Connecticut, grades K–8, under care of Wilton Friends Meeting, NEYM (FGC/FUM)
- Fairville Friends School, Mendenhall, Pennsylvania, Chester County, Pennsylvania, PreK
- Frankford Friends School, Philadelphia, Pennsylvania, grades preK–8, under the care of Frankford Monthly Meeting, PYM (FGC)
- Friends Academy of Westampton, formerly Rancocas Friends Academy, Westampton Township, New Jersey, grades preK–8, independent Quaker school
- Friends Christian School, Yorba Linda, California, grades K–8
- Friends Community School, College Park, Maryland, grades K–8
- Friends School Haverford, Haverford, Pennsylvania, grades preK–8
- Friends School in Detroit, Detroit, Michigan, grades preK–8 (officially closed 2015)
- Friends School of Atlanta, Decatur, Georgia, grades K–8
- Friends School of Charlotte, Charlotte, North Carolina, grades K–4, independent Quaker school
- Friends Academy, Dartmouth Massachusetts
- Friends School of Minnesota, St Paul, Minnesota, grades K–8, independent Quaker school
- Friends School of Portland, Portland, Maine
- Friends School of Wilmington, Wilmington, North Carolina, grades preK–8, informally associated with Wilmington Friends Meeting
- Friends School Mullica Hill, Mullica Hill, New Jersey
- Friends Western School, Pasadena, California, grades preK–5, associated with Orange Grove Meeting
- George Fox Friends School, Cochranville, Pennsylvania, grades PreK–6
- Goshen Friends School, East Goshen, West Chester Area, Pennsylvania, grades preK–5
- Green Mountain Friends School, Burlington, Vermont, ages 5–14 years old
- Greene Street Friends School, Philadelphia, Pennsylvania, grades preK–8
- Greenwood Friends School, Millville, Pennsylvania Under the care of Millville monthly meeting, grades preK–8
- Gwynnedd Friends Pre-School & Kindergarten, Lower Gwynedd Township, Pennsylvania, grades preK-K
- Haddonfield Friends School, Haddonfield, New Jersey grades preK–8, independent Quaker school
- Harford Friends School, Street, Maryland, grades 6–8
- Helen Gander Friends Nursery School, Wilton, Connecticut, grade preK
- High Point Friends School, High Point, North Carolina, grades preK–8
- Lancaster Friends School, Lancaster, Pennsylvania, grades K–8
- Lansdowne Friends School Lansdowne, Pennsylvania, grades preK–6
- London Grove Friends Nursery School, Kennett Square, Pennsylvania, kindergarten
- Media-Providence Friends School, Media, Pennsylvania, grades preK–8
- Newtown Friends School, Newtown, Pennsylvania, grades K–8
- Oak Lane Day Care, Westtown Township, Pennsylvania, grade preK
- Orchard Friends School, Riverton, New Jersey, specializing in students with learning differences, grades K–8
- Pacific Ackworth Friends School, Temple City, California
- Pacific Friends School, Temple City, California, preschool
- Plymouth Meeting Friends School, Plymouth Meeting, Pennsylvania, grades K–6
- Princeton Friends School, Princeton, New Jersey, grades preK–8, under care of Princeton Monthly Friends Meeting, PYM (FGC)
- The Quaker School at Horsham, Horsham, Pennsylvania, grades 1–8
- Rancocas Friends School, Rancocas, Burlington County, New Jersey, grades PreK-K, under care of Rancocas Monthly Meeting, PYM (FGC)
- Richmond Friends School, Richmond, Indiana, grades Preschool through 8
- Ridgewood Friends Neighborhood Nursery School, Ridgewood, New Jersey, preschool
- San Francisco Friends School, San Francisco, California, grades K–8
- Scarsdale Friends Nursery School, Scarsdale, New York, preschool
- School for Friends, Washington, DC, preschool
- State College Friends School, State College, Pennsylvania, grades K–8
- Stratford Friends School, Newtown Square, Pennsylvania, grades K–8
- Swarthmore Friends Nursery School, Swarthmore, Pennsylvania, preschool
- United Friends School, Quakertown, Pennsylvania, grades preK–8
- West Chester Friends School, West Chester, Pennsylvania, grades preK–5
- Westbury Friends School, Westbury, New York, grades preK–5
- Westfield Friends School, Cinnaminson, New Jersey, grades preK–8
- Whittier Friends School, Whittier, California, grades K–6
- Wichita Friends School, Wichita, Kansas, grades preK–6, independent Quaker school, affiliated with EFCI

=== Study centers ===
- John Woolman College Brattleboro, Vermont
- Pendle Hill Quaker Center for Study and Contemplation, Wallingford, Pennsylvania
- Woolman Hill Quaker Center, Deerfield, Massachusetts
- Powell House, Chatham, New York

== Zimbabwe ==
- Hlekweni Friends Rural Service, a training center outside Bulawayo, affiliated with Central and Southern Africa Yearly Meeting
