= Enock Ondego =

Kenyan songwriter, singer and author

- Born: 21 February 1930; Vihiga, Kenya
- Died: 26 February 2023 (aged 93); Kisauni, Mombasa county, Kenya
- Education: Kaimosi
- Occupations: Bishop, former musician
- Years active: 1949–2023
- Employer: Soul winner baptist church
- Known for: Music Composition
- Spouse: Anne Ondego (m. 1983–2006)
- Children: 3
- Website: www.facebook.com/enock.ondego

Enock Ondego (21 February 1930 – 26 February 2023) was a Kenyan songwriter, singer, author, and founder of The Mwakigwena Choir Group and most notable for his biography, The Life Of Mzee Ondego, published by the Kwani trust, and his two songs: Wimbo huu ni wimbo wa historia (This is a song of history) and Kenya ni nchi ya ajabu (Kenya is a wonderful country). Mwakigwena Choir used to perform for the then president Jomo Kenyatta in the late 1970s.

== Early life ==
Enock Ondego was born in Mazigolo, South Maragoli in Vihiga County in 1930, and completed his elementary and high school at Kaimosi.

== Career ==
When he was 17, Ondego started teaching in a local primary school in an attempt to support his family, as he was the eldest son. However, he soon left to join the pre-independence struggle for African political rights. He ran for an election, but lost. After the election, he went back to teaching and was posted to a school in the Kwale district, named Samburu primary school, at Maji ya Chumvi.

Ondego discovered his interest in music whilst teaching at the school, and started composing songs. After Kenyan independence, he became the first Kenyan teacher to sing for the then president Mzee Jomo Kenyatta. So impressed was Jomo by Ondego's music that he elected him head of the presidential music association in 1969. It was at exactly the same period that Ondego recorded the song Kenya ni Nchi ya Ajabu. This song was inspired by his personal experience of the suppression of the Mau Mau rebellion.

The song was adopted by KBC then called Voice of Kenya as an intro song to their news bulletin. According to Enock, However, this was contrived without his knowledge or concurrence and he therefore has not in any way benefited from the use of his song by KBC. Enock filed a lawsuit against KBC in 2010 seeking to be remunerated, It was decided that he be paid the sum of KSh.50 million/= but has allegedly not been reimbursed.

When Mzee Jomo Kenyatta died in 1978, Enock composed yet another song, praising the late president. The song, Wimbo huu ni wimbo wa Historia is a delineation of the tribulations of Kenyatta and the other Kapenguria Six detainees when they were apprehended in 1952 and detained without trial. It also tells of the Kisumu riots that met Jomo when he visited Kisumu on 29 October 1969. The song was passed down as a theme song for the iniquitous Kenyatta Day celebrations up to when the holiday was renamed Mashujaa Day.

== Death ==
Enock Ondego died at his home in Kisauni, Mombasa county, on 26 February 2023, at the age of 93.
