= Catherine Omanyo =

Kenyan politician, school founder

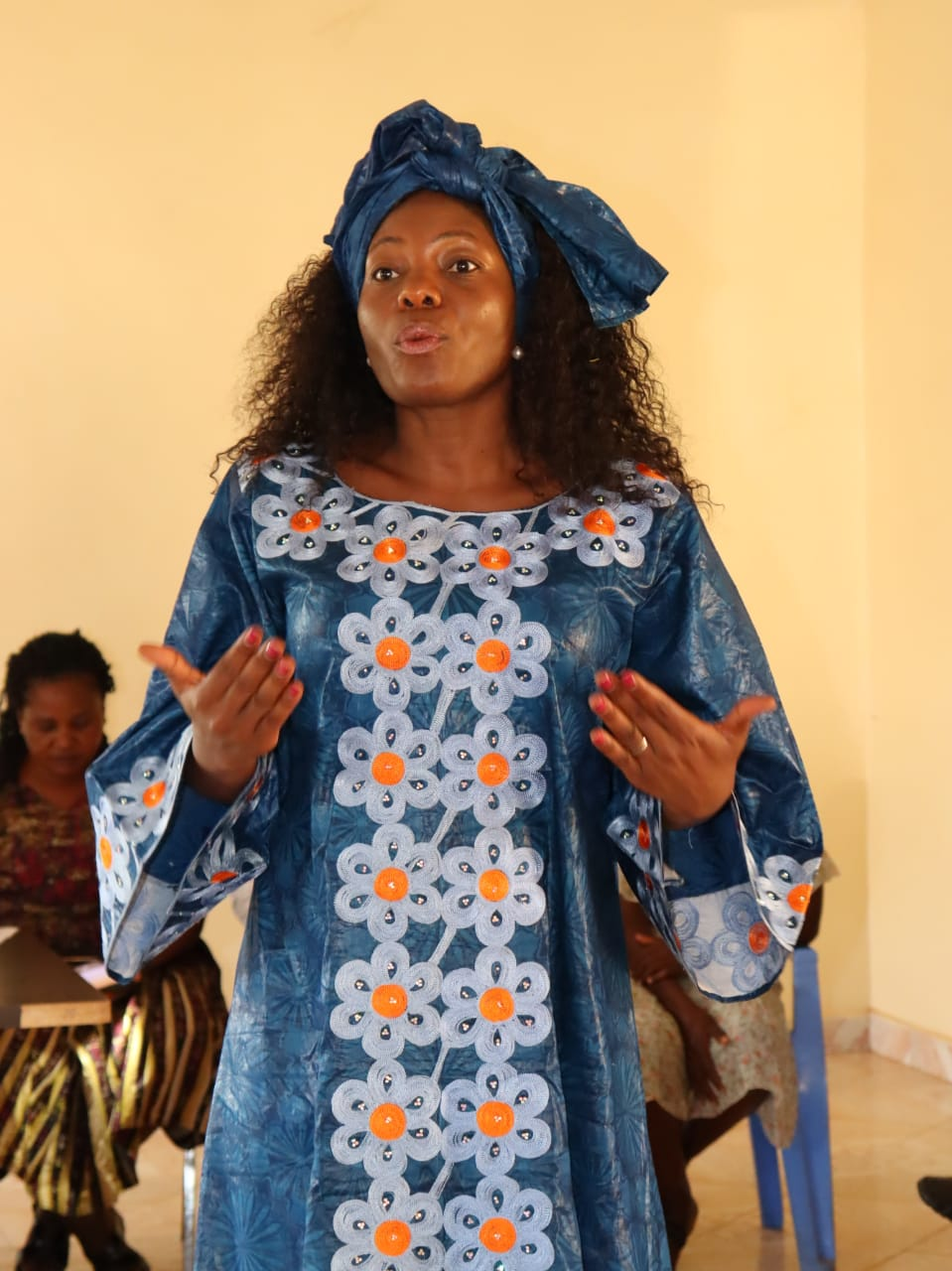
- Omanyo speaks to constituents in Busia County, 2022
- Born: Catherine Nakhabi Omanyo c. July 7, 1978; Busia County, Kenya
- Education: University of Nairobi
- Occupation: Politician
- Known for: Woman Member of Parliament for Busia County; School founder
- Political party: Orange Democratic Movement (ODM)
- Spouse: Daron Kendrick
- Children: Cindy, Sandra

Catherine Nakhabi Omanyo (born 7 July 1978) is a Kenyan politician, education activist, and the county woman representative in National Assembly (Kenya) for Busia County. She is known for her human rights activism, especially her work advocating for the rights of women in Kenya and providing access to education for poor and orphaned children. She is also known as the founder of International School for Champions, a tuition-free school located in Busia County close to the border with Uganda.

== Early life ==
Omanyo was born in Busia County on 7 July 1978. Her father died when she was fourteen, and her mother refused to become the wife of her husband's brother as was the custom. Her husband's family saw this as an insult and her mother had to manage without them. Omanyo was the fourth of ten children and she was very keen to get an education but her mother could not afford the school fees. Omanyo would sneak into classes to listen to the teacher, but when she was discovered she would be punished and ejected.

In 1998, Omanyo was admitted by scholarship to the University of Nairobi and washed clothes to afford tuition. Shocked that many of the children living in the slums of Nairobi were idle because they could not afford school fees, she began tutoring the local children. As her numbers of students grew, she eventually started a small school called Imprezza Academy. The school started in Nairobi in 2001.

== Career ==
=== Activism ===
In 2006, Omanyo started a fumigation campaign to get rid of jigger fleas. The campaign is ongoing and has led to hundreds of homes being treated.

Due to the riots during the 2007–2008 Kenyan crisis, Omanyo was forced to close Imprezza Academy. She left with a few teachers and thirty children who could not be left behind as the school was their only hope. The lorry driver who took them away was murdered by a mob on his return. Omanyo returned to Busia County in 2008 and reopened the school as International School for Champions near Matayos.

In 2009, Omanyo took two weeks of her time to visit Teignmouth in Devon in 2009 so that she could thank the people of the area for the support they give the school. She met many of the school's supporters and she was surprised to observe so few thin people in Devon, until she realized that the supply of food was rarely a problem there as it was in Kenya.

In 2017 she had her third attempt to be elected a member of parliament. Only a small number of women are elected despite a law that requires a gender balance better than two-thirds. In the following year she was one of many who protested that President Kenyatta's six proposed retained Cabinet Secretaries were all male (this did not include the yet to be named twelve new appointees).

In 2021 Omanyo's school was chosen as one of the top four choices for giving to improve education in an article in The New York Times. The author, Peter Coy, recommended the Wikimedia Foundation, the Khan Academy, Children International, and Omanyo and her school. Coy chose Omanyo because he had previously given to the school.

In 2023 she encouraged the country to support girls who are menstruating with sanitary pads. This would have health benefits and increase their arrendance at school. In September she announced a Sh 10 million fund that would action a 2017 order by Kenya’s Fourth President Uhuru Kenyatta. She said that pads and not money would be distributed across the country and funds had been put aside by Cabinet Secretary for Public Service Aisha Jumwa to pay for them.

=== Political career ===
In 2022, Omanyo was elected to National Assembly (Kenya) as county woman representative for Busia County.

She is one of ODM's Deputy Secretary Generals and was selected as acting Secretary General on 11 February 2026, when Edwin Sifuna was removed. However, his removal was halted by the Political Parties Disputes Tribunal (PPDT) on 12 February. On 9 July, the Office of Registrar of Political Parties effected Sifuna's removal saying that the process to do so followed ODM's constitution and the Political Parties Act Cap. 7D. Catherine Omanyo assumed the position in an acting role.

== Support ==
The school enjoys support from people in England and in America. A 16-year-old English girl, Sarah Hulme, of Torquay Girls' Grammar School visited the school and when she returned to Britain she started to raise funds. The charity was founded a year after. Others including the headteacher became involved and the town raises £475 each week to support the school. The school has received funding from the UK Government's Department for International Development to cover the costs of teachers and an exchange scheme for nine teachers.

== Personal life ==
Omanyo is married to Daron, an American-born pastor. She has two children, Cindy and Sandra.
