= Nambale Constituency =

Electoral constituency in Kenya

Nambale
- constituency for the Parliament of Kenya
- Nambale Constituency within Busia County

- Busia County within Kenya
- County: Busia
- Population: 111,636
- Area: 238 km^{2} (91.9 sq mi)

Current constituency
- Number of members: 1
- Party: Independent
- Member of Parliament: Geoffey Mulanywa
- Wards: 4

Nambale Constituency is an electoral constituency in Kenya. It is one of seven constituencies in Busia County. The constituency was established for the 1988 elections.

== Members of Parliament ==
Elections	MP	Party	Notes
1988	Philip J. Wanyama Masinde	KANU	One-party system.
1992	Philip J. Wanyama Masinde	KANU	
1997	Chrysanthus Okemo	KANU	
2002	Chrysanthus Okemo	KANU	
2007	Chrysanthus Okemo	ODM	

Kenya general election 2017 John Sakwa Bunyasi Amani National Congress

== Wards ==
Ward	Registered Voters	Local Authority
Bulanda	1,839	Busia town
Burumba	3,996	Busia town
Mayenje	1,709	Busia town
Mjini	5,707	Busia town
Kisoko	2,555	Nambale town
Lwanyange	1,171	Nambale town
Manyole	2,314	Nambale town
Tangakona / Khwirale	4,152	Nambale town
Bukhayo Central	4,527	Busia County
Bukhayo East	7,029	Busia County
Bukhayo North / Walatsi	5,685	Busia County
Matayos North	11,131	Busia County
Matayos South	9,825	Busia County
Total	61,640	
*September 2005.
