= B1 road (Kenya) =

Road in Kenya

Coordinates: 0°9′31.1″S 34°58′18.9″E

B1 Road is a major road in Kenya connecting Nakuru to the Ugandan border. The road can be divided into two distinct parts: Nakuru - Kisumu highway and Kisumu-Busia highway.

The eastern end of the road begins from Mau Summit east of Nakuru, where it diverts from to the A104 road (Nairobi to Uganda via Eldoret). The section between Ahero and Kisumu is common with A1 road.

== Oil tanker explosion ==
On 20 September 2011, less than 10 days after the 2011 Nairobi pipeline fire, a tanker carrying gasoline from Kisumi to Busia overturned, spilling its contents. Four people were killed and 35 injured when the oil tanker exploded. Some of those injured are reported to have been siphoning off the gasoline.

== Towns ==
The following towns, listed from east towards the west, are located along the highway

- Mau Summit
- Kericho
- Kapsoit
- Awasi
- Ahero
- Kisumu
- Maseno
- Luanda
- Yala
- Ugunja
- Got Nanga
- Bumala
- Busia (border town to Uganda)
