= Oundo =

Oundo is a surname. Notable people with the surname include:

- Alex Oundo (born 1943), Kenyan boxer
- Barbara Nekesa Oundo (born 1984), Ugandan politician and diplomat
- Wilberforce Oundo, Kenyan politician

== See also ==
- Oundle
