= Fredrick Oduya Oprong =

Kenyan politician (1936–2019)

MP
- In office Amagoro
- In office 1997–1993

MP
- In office Busia North
- In office 1974–1979

MP
- In office Busia North
- In office 1966–1969

MP
- In office Elgon West later Busia North
- In office 1963–1966

Personal details
- Born: 1936 Busia County
- Died: 25 May 2019 (aged 82–83) Nairobi, Kenya

Fredrick Oduya Oprong (1936 – May 25, 2019) was a former Kenyan legislator and assistant minister who was awarded the Head of State's Commendation (HSC - Civilian Division) for his contribution towards national development.

== Personal life ==
Oprong had two wives named Florence and Grace. Florence was an education officer. He had many children (some reports of up to 25 children). Of these children, the known children include a son named Isaac Oprong, a son named Lawrence Amke from his second wife, and an unknown number of daughters.

== Political career ==
Prior to joining electoral politics, Oprong was a pre-independence trade unionist, founding the Kenya Quarry and Mines Workers Union (KQMWU). Oprong was among those who joined Jaramogi Oginga Odinga to press for the release of Mzee Jomo Kenyatta and others from detention before independence.

At the independence elections in 1963, he was elected MP as part of the Kenya African National Union (KANU) for the then Elgon West Constituency which was redrawn during his term into Busia North Constituency. Then President Jomo Kenyatta appointed him as an assistant minister for Labour.

After defecting from the KANU to join the Kenya People's Union (KPU), he was re-elected in 1966 in Busia North before the KPU party was outlawed in 1969. He ran for re-election in the 1969 general election but lost to Lawrence Ojaamong.

In 1974, Oprong is re-elected in Busia North.

In 1979, Oprong runs for re-election but is defeated by Stephen Echakara.

In 1992, Oprong runs for election in Amagoro constituency (renamed from Busia North in the 1988 boundary redistribution).

In the 1997 election, Oprong lost his primary for KANU and thus did not run for re-election.

== Assassination attempt ==
In 1994, Oprong was shot twice in the head by an unknown gunman while entering his car at his home in Mariakani Estate in Nairobi. He was hospitalized in Nairobi before being flown to London, England after stabilizing. He remained in a coma for three months in London after the incident, before being transferred to rehabilitation in New York, US. At the time, he was serving as assistant minister for Planning and Economic Development and MP for Amagoro Constituency. The assassination is reported in The Times in 1994, though some less credible sources claim that the attempted assassination occurred in 1993.

The assassination left Oprong disabled, and he never fully recovered from the attack. He continued living with shrapnel in his head following doctors' advice that removal of the second bullet would be too risky.
