= Kizito Osore Wangalwa =

Kenyan politician

His Excellency Kizito Osore Wangalwa

1st Deputy Governor of Busia County
- In office March 2013 – August 2022

Personal details
- Party: ODM
- Education: University of Nairobi (BA), Moi University(MBA)

Kizito Osore Wangalwa is the former Deputy Governor of Busia County, Kenya. He holds a Bachelor of Arts in Economics from the University of Nairobi and a Masters of Business Administration (MBA) from Moi University, Nairobi. He is a member of the Orange Democratic Movement.

== Career ==
Prior to becoming deputy governor of Busia County, He worked as a District Development Officer for 12 years, and was responsible for economic development and development programs. Between 2002 and 2003, he worked as a Principal Economist of the Ministry of Local Government. Prior to becoming a politician, he held a number of senior positions, including at the National Taxpayers Association (NTA). He has also previously worked as a local governance adviser at SNV Netherlands Development Organisation.

== See also ==
- Sospeter Ojaamong - Governor of Busia County
- Busia County
