= Sabatia Constituency =

Electoral constituency in Western Kenya

Sabatia
- constituency for the Parliament of Kenya
- Sabatia Constituency within Vihiga County

- Vihiga County within Kenya
- County: Vihiga
- Population: 131,628
- Area: 111 km^{2} (42.9 sq mi)

Current constituency
- Number of members: 1
- Party: UDA
- Member of Parliament: Clement Sloya
- Wards: 6

Sabatia Constituency is an electoral constituency in Western Kenya. It is one of five constituencies in Vihiga County. It is the home of Kenya's Prime Cabinet Secretary, Musalia Mudavadi. The constituency was established for the 1988 elections. It had a population of 131,628 in the 2019 census.

== Members of Parliament ==
Elections	MP	Party	Notes
1988	Moses Mudavadi	KANU	One-party system. Moses Mudavadi died during his tenure.
1989	Musalia Mudavadi	KANU	By-elections, one-party system
1992	Musalia Mudavadi	KANU	
1997	Musalia Mudavadi	KANU	
2002	Moses Akaranga	NARC	
2007	Musalia Mudavadi	ODM	
2013	Alfred Agoi Masadia	ANC	
2017	Alfred Agoi Masadia	ANC	
2022	Sloya Clement Logova	UDA	

== Wards ==
Wards
Ward	Registered Voters	Local Authority
Busali	10,306	Vihiga county
Chavakali	8,292	Vihiga municipality
Izava	4,052	Vihiga municipality
Lyaduywa	7,323	Vihiga municipality
North Maragoli	8,193	Vihiga municipality
Sabatia West	9,278	Vihiga county
Wodanga	9,087	Vihiga county
Total	56,531	
*September 2005.
