= Bukhwamba =

- Village
- Country: Kenya
- Sub county: Funyula

Bukhwamba is a village in Namboboto-Nambuku Ward, Funyula Constituency, Busia County, bordering Uganda.
