= Amagoro Constituency =

Amagoro Constituency was an electoral constituency in Kenya's former Western Province. It was the only constituency in the now-defunct Teso District. Sospeter Ojaamong represented the constituency for the Orange Democratic Movement in the National Assembly, and did so since 2002. In the 2007 general election, he was challenged by Gabriel Obasie of the recently created Party of National Unity.

In 2010, the Teso district was eliminated and replaced by Busia County, and the electoral constituency was divided into Teso North Constituency and Teso South Constituency.
