= Teso North Constituency =

Electoral constituency in Kenya

Teso North
- constituency for the Parliament of Kenya
- Teso North Constituency within Busia County

- Busia County within Kenya
- County: Busia
- Population: 138034
- Area: 261 km^{2} (100.8 sq mi)

Current constituency
- Number of members: 1
- Party: ODM
- Member of Parliament: Edward Oku Kaunya
- Wards: 6

Teso North is an electoral constituency in Kenya in Busia County. It is one of seven constituencies serving the county. The constituency was created in 2013 following the slipt of the Amagoro constituency into two to form Teso North and Teso South. The constituency covers an area of approximately 257.1 km^{2} (99.3 sq mi) and has a population of 117,974 people.

== Members of Parliament ==
Teso North constituency is served by Oku Kaunya, following the 2022 general election. In the 2022 election, Oku Kaunya was re-elected with 23,403 votes. Lawi Mamai from the Democratic Action Party finished in second with 11,354 votes.

Elections	MP	Party	Notes
2013	Auther Odera	URP	
2017	Oku Kaunya	ANC	
2022	Oku Kaunya	ODM	
