= Mbweka =

- Location within Kenya
- Coordinates: 0.45°N 34.15°E
- Country: Kenya
- County: Busia County
- Time zone: UTC+3 (EAT)

Mbweka is a settlement in Kenya's Busia County.

Approximate population for 7 km radius from this point: 91,823
