= Mary Emaase =

Kenyan accountant and politician

- Education: Kenyatta University
- Occupation: politician
- Known for: twice elected to the National Assembly
- Political party: United Democratic Alliance

Mary Emaase Otucho is a Kenyan accountant and politician. She was elected to the National Assembly in 2013 she was not re-elected in 2017. She was elected again to represent the Teso South constituency in Busia County in 2022.

== Life ==
Emasse attended St. Monica Chakol Girls Secondary School from 1983 to 1988 before going to Kenyatta University in 1989. She graduated in 1992.

She worked as an accountant. She was first elected to the National Assembly as the Woman Representative for Busia in 2013 and she served until 2017. She was on the Finance committee and she was the vice chair of the Budget and Appropriations Committee.

In 2017 she was a candidate for the Teso South constituency in Busia County but she was beaten by Geoffrey Omuse. She spent her time until the next election working but also campaigning for the United Democratic Alliance. She stood again in 2022 against five other candidates including the former governor Sospeter Ojaamong and the incumbent MP Geoffrey Omuse and she won. She was one of several women MPs who were the only woman elected in their county. The others included Mary Maingi in Kirinyaga County, Naisula Lesuuda in Samburu County and Mishi Mboko in Mombasa.
