= Priscilla Abwao =

Kenyan activist (1924–2009)

- Born: 1924; Vihiga County, Kenya
- Died: 17 November 2009 (aged 84–85)
- Occupations: Educator, social worker, activist

Priscilla Ingasiani Agufwana Abwao (1924 – 17 November 2009) was a Kenyan educator, social worker, and political activist. She represented Kenyan women at the Lancaster House Conference in London in 1962.

== Early life and education ==
Abwao was from Vihiga County, Kenya, the daughter of Andrew Liko Agufwana and Maria Lavoga. She attended Kaimosi Friends' Primary School, and graduated from Nabumali High School in Uganda. She trained for a career in teaching at the Women's Training Centre in Kabete, and studied domestic science at Radbrook College in England in 1955.

== Career ==
Abwao taught at her alma mater, the Kaimasi Friends Primary School, from 1949 to 1951. She became a social worker, assigned to Nyanza province. She became a Community Development Officer in 1956. She was appointed an official visitor to Kisumu Prison in 1962.

In 1961, Abwao was nominated by Sir Patrick Muir Renison to be the only African woman delegate to the Lancaster House Constitutional Conference. She presented her "Memorandum on Behalf of African Women to the Kenyan Constitution" at the 1962 meeting, but was not allowed to speak at the event. She resigned from the conference council in June 1962. She organized a women's conference in 1962 to plan for women's rights after Kenyan independence, saying "It is not time to sit and gossip. We have to work and build."

In 1961 and 1962, Abwao served in the Legislative Council (LegCo), and visited the United States to speak on Kenya's transition to self-rule, sponsored by the Overseas Educational Fund of the League of Women Voters.

== Personal life ==
Priscilla Agufwana married Johnson Abwao. They had five daughters. She died in 2009, in her eighties.
