= Moses Akaranga =

Kenyan politician

Reverend Moses Akaranga

1st Governor of Vihiga County
- Incumbent
- Assumed office 27 March 2013
- Deputy: Caleb Temba Amaswache
- Succeeded by: Dr Wilber K Ottichilo

Member of the Kenyan Parliament
- In office 2003–2007
- President: Mwai Kibaki
- Preceded by: Musalia Mudavadi
- Succeeded by: Musalia Mudavadi
- Constituency: Sabatia

Personal details
- Born: 18 October 1953 (age 72)
- Party: PPK
- Spouse: Elizabeth Akaranga
- Children: 5
- Occupation: Reverend

Reverend Moses Akaranga is a Kenyan politician who served as the first governor of Vihiga county having been defeated by Dr. Wilberforce Ottichilo in August 2017. He is also former Member of parliament for Sabatia constituency, having defeated Musalia Mudavadi of KANU from the Sabatia Constituency seat in the 2002 elections on a Ford-Kenya ticket. He served only one term and was defeated by Mudavadi, who was now representing Orange Democratic Movement at the 2007 elections.

He is the first Kenyan Member of Parliament to unseat a sitting Vice President.

== political career ==
In 2002, he was elected as M.P for Sabatia Constituency. He served as a Commissioner with the Parliamentary Service Commission and was the Chairperson of the Parliamentary Staff Welfare Committee. In 2003, he was appointed as Assistant Minister for Agriculture and in 2004 became Minister of State for Public Service in the Office of the President. During his tenure as a Minister, Kenya was awarded the prestigious United Nations Public Service Award. He initiated Performance Contracting in the Public Service, introduced the Rapid Results Initiative program (RRI), oversaw the review of civil servant salaries and the increment of pensions to all retired civil servants. He has also served as the vice chairman of the Humanitarian Settlement Fund. He previously worked as a Senior Business Manager at Barclays Bank of Kenya Limited thereafter working with the [[Pentecostal Assemblies of Kenya]] (P.A.G. Kenya) as the General Administrator. In Kenya’s 2013 general election, Moses vied in the gubernatorial elections, winning as Governor of Vihiga County, alongside Deputy Governor Caleb Temba Amaswache. He was elected on a PPK party ticket.
