= Florence Mwikali Mutua =

Kenyan politician

- Education: Kenya School of Business Studies; Kenya Polytechnic; Wote College
- Occupation: Politician

Florence Mwikali Mutua is a Kenyan politician from Busia town. A former member of the National Assembly of Kenya. A former Women representative for Busia county. She was the Women Representative for Busia county for two terms, from August 2013 to August 2022. Under the reign of the fourth president of Kenya, Uhuru Muigai Kenyatta. She served the two terms through Orange Democratic Movement. In the latest Kenyan election, the 2022 general election, she vied for the governor seat though she lost it to Paul Otuoma. Mutua is the only woman to vie for the gubernatorial race in Busia during the 2022 general election. If she had won, she would have become the first woman governor in Busia county.

== Education ==
Between 2007 and 2009, she enrolled in Methodist University to pursue a bachelor's degree in human resources. She earned diplomas in business and office management from the Kenya School of Business Studies, medical secretariat at Kenya Polytechnic and public relations at Wote College. In 2010, Mutua earned an MA in project planning.

== Career ==
From 1993 to 2000 Mutua was a medical secretariat at Aga Khan Hospital. Between 2000 and 2012, Mutua held several positions at UNICEF including program assistant, human resource assistant and operations. She was a women's representative for Busia County from 2013 to 2022. Between 2013 and 2017 she was also a member of the departmental committee on agriculture, livestock and cooperatives and the committee for regional integration. In October 2022, Mutua resigned as the deputy secretary general for the Orange Democratic Movement.
