= Emmaloba =

- Location within Kenya
- Coordinates: 0.03°N 34.57°E
- Country: Kenya
- County: Vihiga County
- Time zone: UTC+3 (EAT)

Emmaloba is a settlement in Kenya's Vihiga County.
