= Mbale (disambiguation) =

Mbale is a city in the Eastern Region of Uganda.

Mbale may also refer to:

- Mbale District, A district in the Eastern Region of Uganda
- Mbale, Kenya, the capital of Vihiga County in Kenya
