= Oduya =

Oduya is a surname, common among the Luo ethnic group in Kenya. Notable people with the name include:

- Johnny Oduya (born 1981), Swedish ice hockey player
- Fredrik Oduya (1975–2011), Swedish ice hockey player
- Fredrick Oduya Oprong (1936–2019), Kenyan politician
