= Teso District =

Teso District may refer to:

- Teso District, Kenya
- Teso District, Uganda
