= Chavakali High School =

Coordinates: 0.1175°N 34.7376°E

Location
- off Kakamega-Kisumu highway Vihiga

Information
- Other name: Chavakali Boys
- Established: January 1959
- School district: Sabatia
- Teaching staff: >80

Chavakali High School is a Kenyan national high school in Vihiga County, western Kenya, established on 12 January 1959 by the Nyanza district officials with the support of American Friends(Quakers) African Mission missionaries. It is located in Sabatia sub-county. Chavakali transitioned from a mixed school to a boys high school during Moi's tenure.

== History. ==
The school was founded as a vocational institution to train locals in the agrarian sector and equip them with skills which were to aid in the development of the future of agriculture in Kenya. The administrators emphasized practical training in its curriculum with the aim of equipping the locals with agrarian-based skills which were necessary for Kenya's rural-based agriculture economy.

== Academics ==
The school is among the best performing schools in western region and the best boys school in Vihiga county alongside Bunyore girls, with over three-quarters of its students transitioning to universities for higher education every year.

The school transitioned to a Boys' Senior School in line with the Competency Based Curriculum which was introduced in 2018 in Kenya, with all secondary/high schools in the country being renamed to senior schools.

Handing over of awards from student during assembly

== Extra-curricular activities ==
Chavakali is known for sports, successfully competing in rugby, football, basketball, hockey and other disciplines. The school's team reached the national levels and East Africa region level during the 2018 rugby season. The school has since lost its rugby prowess and has failed to reach the nationals since 2018.

Chavakali high school takes part in the music and drama festivals. The school choir takes part in music festivals and has on more than one occasion represented the school up to the national level. The school's band won the 2019 Music Festivals competitions at the national level.

Students of Chavakali's debating club represented the school in the East Africa Debate Championship 2026 in Arusha, Tanzania.

Chavakali students and their teacher at east Africa debate championship 2026

== See also ==
- Kakamega school
- Maseno school
