= Torquay Girls' Grammar School =

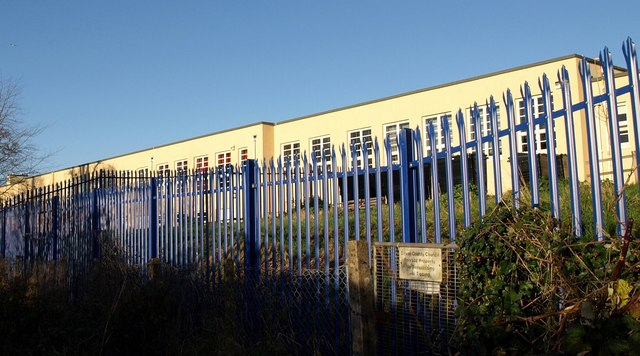

Location
- 30 Shiphay Lane; Torquay, Devon, TQ2 7DY; United Kingdom
- 50°28′37″N 3°33′13″W

Information
- Type: Girls' Grammar School, Academy
- Motto: Aude Sapere; Dare to be Wise
- Religious affiliation: Church of England
- Established: 1915
- Local authority: Torbay
- Specialist: Humanities College
- Department for Education URN: 136506 Tables
- Ofsted: Reports
- Headmaster: Sarah Forster
- Gender: Girls
- Age: 11 to 18
- Enrolment: 851
- Houses: Beal; Jackson; Robertson; Wilkinson; Cross; Omanyo
- Colour: Navy
- Website: https://tggsacademy.org/

Torquay Girls' Grammar School is a selective grammar school for girls aged 11–18, in Torquay, Devon, UK. It is situated directly beside Torquay Boys' Grammar School, and became one of the first schools to achieve Humanities Specialist School status in September 2004, as well as one of the first to offer the AQA Baccalaureate. On 1 February 2011, the school officially gained academy status. It is a member of the South West Academic Trust – a collaboration of seven high-performing grammar schools and Exeter University. The examination results regularly place the school in the top twenty state girls' schools nationally.

== History ==
The school, which was founded in 1915, settled at its current location in 1939. While the school continues to use its original building, the interiors have been updated and additional buildings have been added, including the Haystacks building (Art, English and Geography) in 1995 and the Roberts building (languages, history, new library/learning resource centre) in 2007. In July 2008, the Cross building was officially opened – the new music and drama block.

The school purchased its own residential study centre in Tregourez, Brittany, in 1990. Pupils in years 7 and 9 stay there during May/June as a form to encourage social interaction and improve their French. This building has since been sold.

The most recent Ofsted inspection was in 2011, with the result being it was found to be 'outstanding in all categories'.

The school motto is 'Aude Sapere', meaning 'dare to be wise'.

== Buildings and facilities ==
The grounds of the school include:

- The Main building, commonly called "The Triangle" (Maths, RE, Business studies, Economics, Science, ICT, Food Technology, Textiles)
- The Haystacks building (English, Geography, Art)
- The Roberts building (Languages, specifically French and German, History and a study centre/'Learning Resource Centre')
- The Cross building (Music and Drama)
- The Dining Hall (also used for assemblies, performances, meetings etc.)
- The Sixth form block (Psychology, Politics, Media studies, Careers, 6th form common room)
- Burton Hall (a hall used for Dance and exams and hired out to the community)
- A Gym building, consisting of a hall used for various purposes.
- An astroturf area (sand based) used for sport. Can be hired out to the community ( shared with Torquay Boys Grammar School)
- The Pavilions (changing rooms can be hired out to the community. currently belonging to Torquay Boys' Grammar)
- Three Netball/Tennis courts
- Fields, including a large green area between the Girls' school and Boys' school, referred to as 'The Paddock' (Year 10-13 may go there at lunchtime while other years can only go before and after school)

== Forms and houses ==
Upon entering the school in year 7, each girl is put into one of six forms and in one of six houses. These forms contain all the girls of that house in that year. This means all girls in e.g. 7B are of Beal house, and in year 7. There are given six such houses and therefore six forms in a year group. Younger sisters are usually put in the same house as older sisters.

The girls stay in these houses. They are taught in these form groups for most subjects in years 7–8, but some other subjects are taught in ability groups (e.g. maths) or in the case of technology, alphabetically, as there is not enough room in the tech rooms for all the form to be taught at the same time.

Each house is named after a past headteacher.

- Beal (blue)
- Jackson (green)
- Robertson (red)
- Wilkinson (yellow)
- Cross (white)
- Omanyo (purple)

== Sixth form ==
The two Lower Sixth forms used to share the Lower Sixth common room in Shiphay Manor, owned by the Boys' Grammar, while the two Upper Sixths share the Upper Sixth common room in the Sixth Form (formerly 'E') Block of the Boys' Grammar.

Now two new buildings, a new Sixth Form block, and a new music and drama suite, have been finished and the sixth form have lessons in their new block. There are still two common rooms, one in the Girls' school and one in the neighbouring Boys' school.

The Sixth Form have lessons in the purpose-built Sixth-Form block and in the main school (e.g. Chemistry in the science labs).

The Sixth Form will be mixed entry from September 2025.

== Notable former pupils ==
Sarah Hulme was a pupil here. When she was 16 she visited a school in Kenya that was started by Catherine Omanyo and she decided she wanted to help. When she returned to Britain she started to raise funds. A charity was founded a year after. A headteacher at this school became involved and the town raises £475 each week to support the International School for Champions in Busia near Uganda. The school has also received funding from the UK Government's Department for International Development to cover the costs of teachers and an exchange scheme for teachers which has included teachers from this school.

- Georgina Butler, diplomat
- Katherine Roberts, author
- Georgia Toffolo: Made in Chelsea and I'm a Celebrity Get Me Out of Here winner 2017
- Helen Sanderson-White, musician, artist, and writer
