= Makhoma =

- Country: Kenya
- County: Busia County
- Time zone: UTC+3 (EAT)

Makhoma is a settlement in Kenya's Busia County. The approximate population of 7 km radius from this point is 37720.
