= Musalia Mudavadi =

Prime Cabinet Secretary of Kenya since 2022

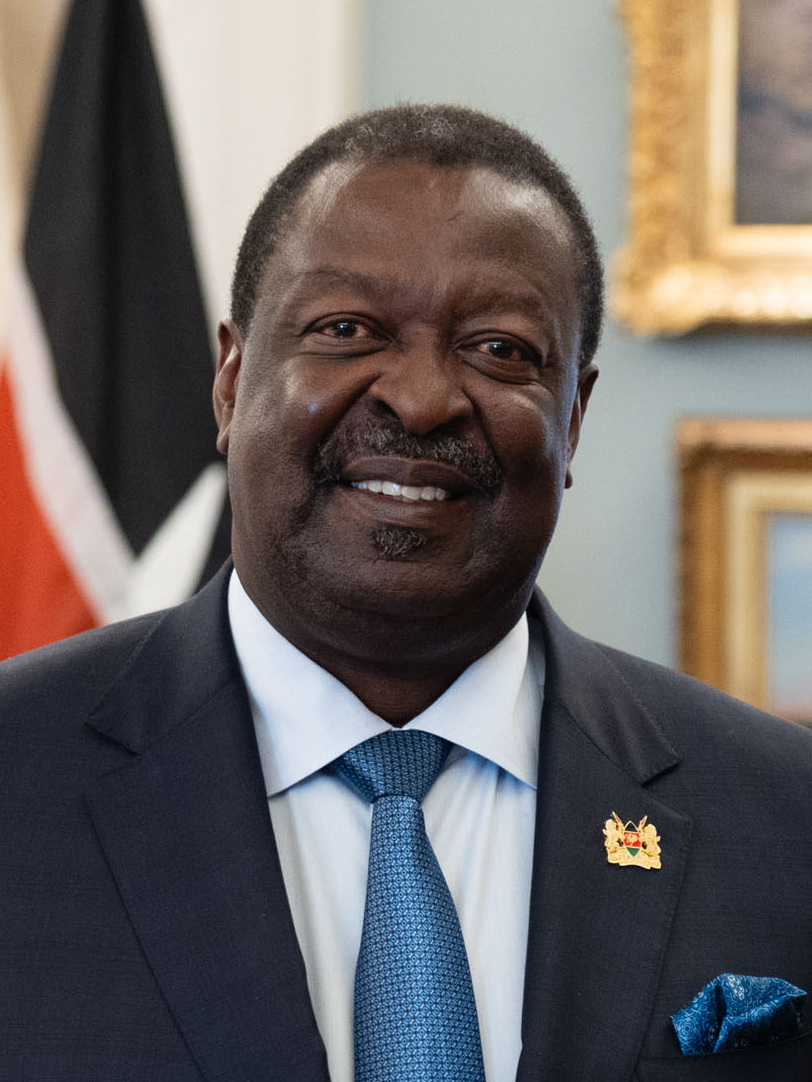
- Mudavadi in 2024

Prime Cabinet Secretary of Kenya
- Incumbent
- Assumed office 27 October 2022
- President: William Ruto
- Preceded by: Position established

Cabinet Secretary for Foreign and Diaspora Affairs of Kenya
- Incumbent
- Assumed office 23 October 2023
- President: William Ruto
- Preceded by: Alfred Mutua

Deputy Prime Minister of Kenya
- In office 13 April 2008 – 9 April 2013 Serving with Uhuru Kenyatta
- President: Mwai Kibaki
- Prime Minister: Raila Odinga

Minister for Local Government
- In office 13 April 2008 – 2 May 2012
- President: Mwai Kibaki
- Prime Minister: Raila Odinga
- Preceded by: Uhuru Kenyatta
- Succeeded by: Position abolished

7th Vice President of Kenya
- In office 4 November 2002 – 3 January 2003
- President: Daniel Arap Moi
- Preceded by: George Saitoti
- Succeeded by: Michael Wamalwa

Minister of Transport and Communication
- In office 2000–2002
- President: Daniel arap Moi
- Preceded by: Position established
- Succeeded by: John Michuki

Minister for Information, Transport and Communication
- In office 1999–2000
- President: Daniel arap Moi
- Preceded by: William Ole Ntimama
- Succeeded by: Position abolished

Minister of Finance
- In office 1993–1997
- President: Daniel arap Moi
- Preceded by: George Saitoti
- Succeeded by: Simeon Nyachae

Minister for Supplies and Marketing
- In office 1989–1993
- President: Daniel arap Moi
- Preceded by: Mulu Mutisya

Member of Parliament
- In office 1989–2013
- Preceded by: Moses Mudavadi
- Succeeded by: Alfred Masadia
- Constituency: Sabatia

Personal details
- Born: Wycliffe Musalia Mudavadi; 21 September 1960 (age 66) Sabatia, North Nyanza District, Nyanza Province, Kenya Colony
- Party: Amani National Congress
- Spouse: Tessie Shangatti
- Children: 3
- Parent: Moses Mudavadi (father)
- Education: University of Nairobi

Wycliffe Musalia Mudavadi (born 21 September 1960) is a Kenyan politician and land economist who is currently serving as Prime Cabinet Secretary of Kenya, and since 2023, in an expanded role of Foreign & Diaspora Affairs cabinet secretary of Kenya. As of 1 November 2024, he is also serving as the cabinet secretary in the ministry of interior, albeit in an acting capacity, succeeding Prof. Kithure Kindiki who was appointed Deputy president following the impeachment of Rigathi Gachagua. He is a former party leader of the Amani National Congress (ANC), one of the founding political parties, of the Kenya Kwanza alliance.

After the death of his father Moses Mudavadi in 1989, Musalia Mudavadi joined politics contesting and winning in the by-election in Sabatia Constituency, a position he held until 2013. Mudavadi served as the seventh Vice-President of Kenya in 2002 under the presidency of Daniel arap Moi. He held the position of Deputy Prime Minister (2008–2013) and Minister of Local Government (2008–2012), in the coalition government of Mwai Kibaki and Raila Odinga. In May 2012, Mudavadi resigned from his role as Minister of Local Government to contest for the presidency in the 2013 Kenyan general election where he finished third. He was the deputy party leader of the Orange Democratic Movement (ODM) (2005–2012) and Party Leader of the United Democratic Forum Party (UDF) from May 2012 to July 2015.

== Early life and education ==
Mudavadi was raised in a Quaker Christian denomination family. He is of the ethnic Maragoli dialect, an extract of the populous Luhya community of western Kenya. After his late father Moses S. B. Mudavadi, he is the only other Kenyan politician who does not swear oaths of office because his faith forbids it.

Mudavadi schooled at Nairobi Primary School, then Jamhuri and Nairobi School for his A- levels and the University of Nairobi. He pursued a Bachelor of Arts(Land Economics) degree. For sports, he played rugby as a winger for his high school and university's Mean Machine RFC.

== Political career ==
=== Government career ===
Mudavadi, first became a Member of Parliament in 1989 when he was elected unopposed in a by-election to take the Sabatia Constituency seat vacated by his deceased father Moses Mudamba Mudavadi. He went on to win the seat in the 1992 and 1997 general elections.

Mudavadi has served as Minister for Supplies and Marketing (1989 - 1993), Finance (1993 - 1997), Agriculture (1997 - 1999), Transport, Communications and Information (2000 - 2002). In addition, he has served as vice-president (2002) and also as Deputy Prime Minister and Minister for Local Government of the Republic of Kenya (2008 - 2013).

=== 2002 election ===
In late 2002 Mudavadi was the last and shortest serving Vice-President of Kenya under President Daniel arap Moi. Mudavadi ran as Uhuru Kenyatta's running mate in the 2002 election. Despite the support of incumbent President Moi, the Kenyatta/Mudavadi ticket was beaten by Kibaki/Wamalwa and Mudavadi lost his Sabatia parliamentary seat.

=== 2005 referendum ===
In 2005 Mudavadi made a political comeback by joining Raila Odinga's Liberal Democratic Party (LDP) and aligning himself with the 'No' side in that year's Referendum on the proposed new Constitution amidst speculation that he was set to become the leading Luhya politician.

=== 2007 election ===
After the 2005 referendum, the “No” side formed the Orange Democratic Movement- Kenya (ODM-K). But after the ODM-K split, Mudavadi joined the Orange Democratic Movement (ODM) where he rose to the Deputy Party Leader. In 2007 Mudavadi sought the nomination of the ODM candidate for the December 2007 presidential election. On September 1, 2007, Mudavadi came second with 391 votes to Odinga's 2,656 votes in a disputed nomination process. However, along with the other defeated candidates, Mudavadi supported Odinga and Mudavadi was named Odinga's running mate for the election.

Although the election was officially won by Kibaki, ODM disputed the official results and claimed victory for Odinga. A violent post election crisis developed, which eventually led to the signing of a power-sharing agreement (National Accord) between Kibaki and Odinga. As part of the grand coalition government, Mudavadi was named as Deputy Prime Minister and Minister for Local Government on 13 April 2008. He was the Deputy Prime Minister representing the ODM while Kenyatta was the Deputy Prime Minister representing Kibaki's Party of National Unity. Mudavadi and the rest of the Cabinet were sworn in on 17 April 2008.

== Presidential elections ==
=== 2013 general elections ===
In 2012, Musalia Mudavadi sought for the nomination of ODM to be its presidential candidate for the 2013 General Election. He later on decamped from ODM citing a lack of political freedom in the party. He said the illegal/unconstitutional political mechanisms placed his way made it impossible for any other aspirant to seek a successful free and fair presidential nomination.

Mudavadi left ODM after he was technically locked out of the nomination race through a party constitution clause that gave the party leader a direct nomination as the presidential candidate. Musalia, however, refused to resign as the Deputy Prime Minister of the Republic of Kenya citing that the office was a public office and not a party office. He later took over the United Democratic Front Party (UDF) and became its flag-bearer for the presidential election.

Briefly, he joined Uhuru Kenyatta and William Ruto to form the Jubilee Coalition bringing together UDF, URP and TNA parties. However, Mudavadi left the coalition after a breach of contract which had stated that Uhuru Kenyatta would step down in his favour as the presidential flag-bearer for the UDF/TNA/URP Jubilee coalition. Uhuru surprised the nation by admitting that he indeed signed the agreement but blamed his decision to renege on "dark forces", yet the breach of agreement resulted from fierce objection by Uhuru's supporters insisting that he must be on the presidential ballot. But earlier, Uhuru had insisted that nominations had to be done through voting by party delegates. Mudavadi objected saying the joint candidate had been agreed upon by consensus and that the partners in the Jubilee Coalition were new and did not have bonafide delegates selected through grassroots elections. Mudavadi made a solo run on UDF and came third in the race, for the top leadership in the country in that election.

=== 2017 general elections ===
After the 2013 elections, elements within UDF begun a disruptive scheme to mortgage the party to the ruling Jubilee Coalition. In July 2015 Mudavadi abandoned UDF, which was later dissolved. He formed the Amani National Congress (ANC) that would take him to the presidential race come 2017. Keenly aware of the configuration of Kenyan elections, Mudavadi formed the National Super Alliance (NASA) coalition and invited the CORD trio of ODM's Raila Odinga, Wiper's Kalonzo Musyoka and Ford-Kenya's Moses Wetang’ula to join. NASA settled on Odinga as its presidential candidate. Mudavadi was the only principal of the NASA not to stand for an elective seat in 2017 general election as he settled for NASA campaign chairman.

=== 2022 general elections ===
After the 2017 General Election, the NASA presidential candidate Raila Odinga decided to swear himself in. Mudavadi refused to be part of the swearing-in, terming it unconstitutional. On 9 March 2018, Odinga had signed an armistice with President Uhuru Kenyatta. Since 2018, Mudavadi chose to remain in Opposition.

In March 2021 Mudavadi strategically aligned with the other two NASA Principals Kalonzo Musyoka and Moses Wetangula, and KANU Chairman Gideon Moi, to form the One Kenya Alliance (OKA).

Mudavadi supported the presidential candidature of the Deputy President William Ruto and they won the 9 August 2022 General Election against Raila Odinga who had the support of incumbent President Uhuru Kenyatta, with a majority under the Kenya Kwanza Alliance (KKA) that he had formed while still in OKA.

On 27 September 2022, President William Ruto issued and signed a Presidential executive order establishing the office of the Prime Cabinet Secretary of the Republic of Kenya, and nominated Mudavadi to the position. During President Ruto's live address to the nation, he stated that the Office of the Prime Cabinet Secretary (PCS) is the most senior office in the executive arm of the government after that of the President and Deputy President. Mudavadi was officially sworn in as PCS at State House, Kenya on 27 October 2022.

Upon his nomination as Prime Cabinet Secretary in October 2022, Musalia Mudavadi stepped down as leader of the Amani National Congress (ANC) in compliance with constitutional provisions barring appointed state officers from holding party office. He was replaced as acting party leader by Lamu governor Issa Timamy.

On 4 October 2023, President Ruto transferred the functions of Ministry of Foreign Affairs to the Office of the Prime Cabinet Secretary, consequently expanding the portfolio mandate of Mudavadi's office.

Following the dissolution of his cabinet in July 2024, President Ruto appointed Mudavadi to act as Cabinet Secretary across all ministries pending new appointments. A gazette notice dated 11 July 2024 stated: “Hon. Wycliffe Musalia Mudavadi, E.G.H., is assigned as the Acting Cabinet Secretary in all vacant ministerial portfolios.

In April 2025, Mudavadi was appointed by President William Ruto as one of Kenya’s representatives on the Kenya-European Union Economic Partnership Agreement (EPA) Council. The council is tasked with overseeing implementation of the EPA, which gives Kenya duty-free and quota-free access to the EU market under certain conditions. He joined with the UK Foreign Secretary, Ed Miliband, and EU High Representative for Foreign Affairs and Security Policy, Kaja Kallas, in co-hosting a meeting of foreign ministers at the UN General Assembly in September 2026 concerned with addressing "the security risks of the intensifying climate and nature crisis".

== Controversies ==
=== Graves plot scandal ===
In March 2010, Deputy Prime Minister Musalia Mudavadi faced investigation by the Kenya Anti-Corruption Commission (KACC) over a Sh283 million cemetery land fraud. KACC officials said the fraud involved the City Council of Nairobi buying land valued at Sh24 million for nearly Sh300 million. Mudavadi protested his innocence and said KACC was being unfair by accusing him without giving him a chance to be heard. In June 2020 according to court records as reported by the Daily Nation, Mudavadi did not benefit from cemetery land deal thus was not culpable in the scandal. It later emerged that Mudavadi did not receive any funds from the scandal neither was he involved in any way in the conspiracy to defraud

=== Vihiga Land Scam ===
In May 2025, Mudavadi was reported to be involved in a land scam scheme in Vihiga by illegally dispossessing a private company of its property. A magistrate's court in Vihiga found the private company to be the rightful owner of the disputed land and that Mudavadi had acted illegally by taking possession of the property aggressively and illegally for a brief period in 2024 yet the private company had been in possession of the same property for over 13 years. Mudavadi was reported to move to a higher court to dispute the outcome of the magistrate's court regarding the same matter. It was reported that the private company described Mudavadi's actions as a quest to seek the court's protection in order to clothe his illegal activity on the disputed land with the color of the law.

=== LSK blacklist ===
In January 2012, the Law Society of Kenya (LSK) listed Mudavadi as one of the public officials mentioned adversely in various reports on issues ranging from corruption to economic crimes. The LSK advised voters not to vote those mentioned in the report as they had previously been compromised. According to LSK, the time Mudavadi was blacklisted was a time of a veiled blanket allegations against the Kibaki administration officials such as former President Mwai Kibaki, William Ruto, Charity Ngilu, but without specific allegations levelled against any of them. Thus, the LSK listing was found to have no specific accusation that Mudavadi was culpable to warrant the blacklist.

== Personal life ==
Mudavadi is married to Tessie Mudavadi and they have three children; Moses, Michael and Maryanne.

Mudavadi is a fan of English Premier League football team Manchester United and Kenyan Premier League side AFC Leopards. He once served as a patron of AFC Leopards. In addition, he is also a golf and rugby enthusiast.

He has an autobiography published in 2019 entitled Musalia Mudavadi: Soaring Above The Storms of Passion.

In addition, Mudavadi is an ardent fan of old school country music with Kenny Rodgers and Dolly Parton being his favorite musicians.

== See also ==
- Musalia Mudavadi Official Website
- Maragoli Cultural Festival
- Moses Mudavadi

Political offices
Preceded by George Saitoti	Minister of Finance; 1993–1997	Succeeded by Simeon Nyachae
Preceded by George Saitoti	Vice President of Kenya; 2002–2003	Succeeded by Michael Wamalwa
New title	Prime Cabinet Secretary of Kenya; 2022–present	Incumbent
