= Alupe University =

Collegiate university of Moi University, Kenya

Coordinates: 0°29′56.382″N 34°7′56.953″E

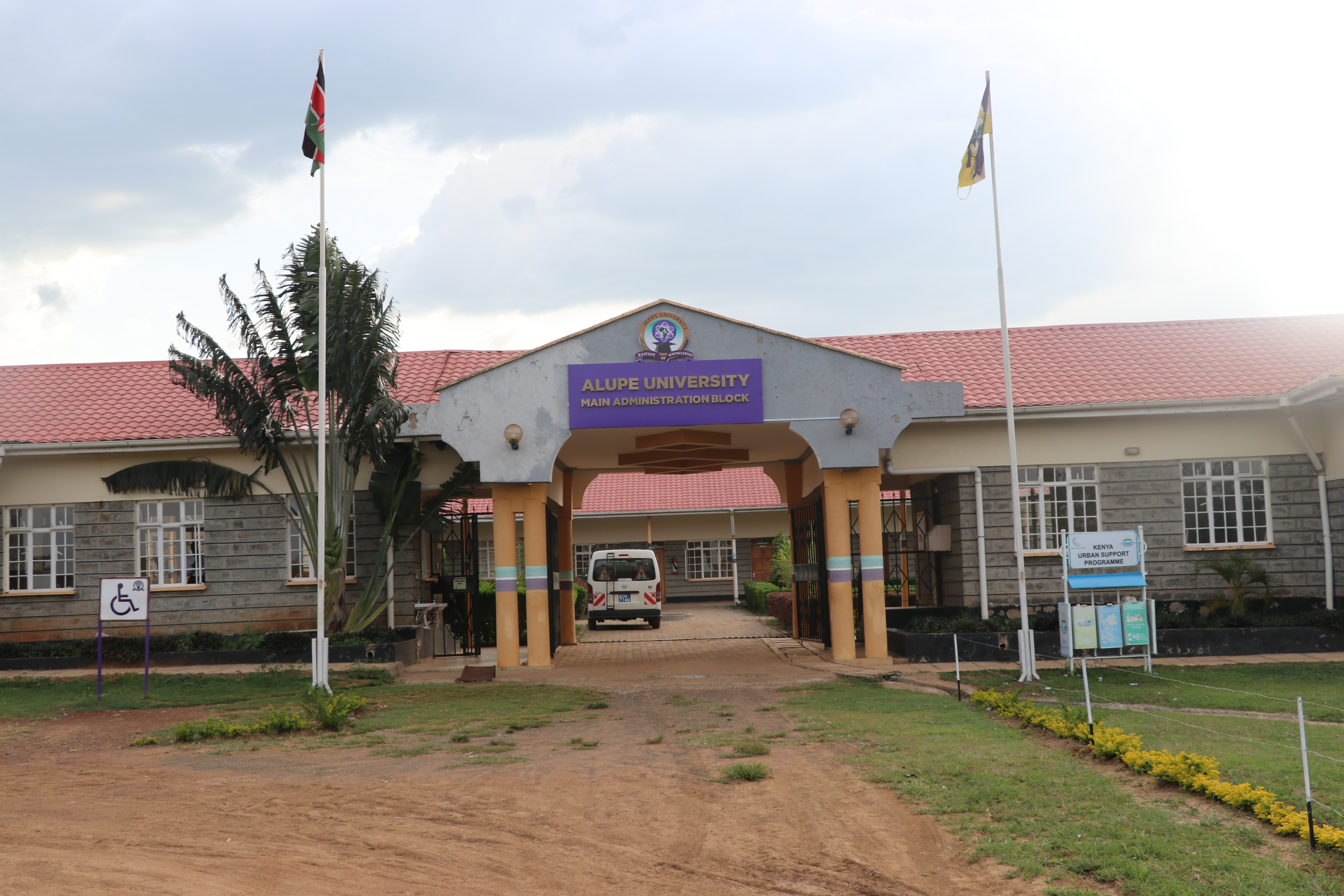
Alupe University Administration Block

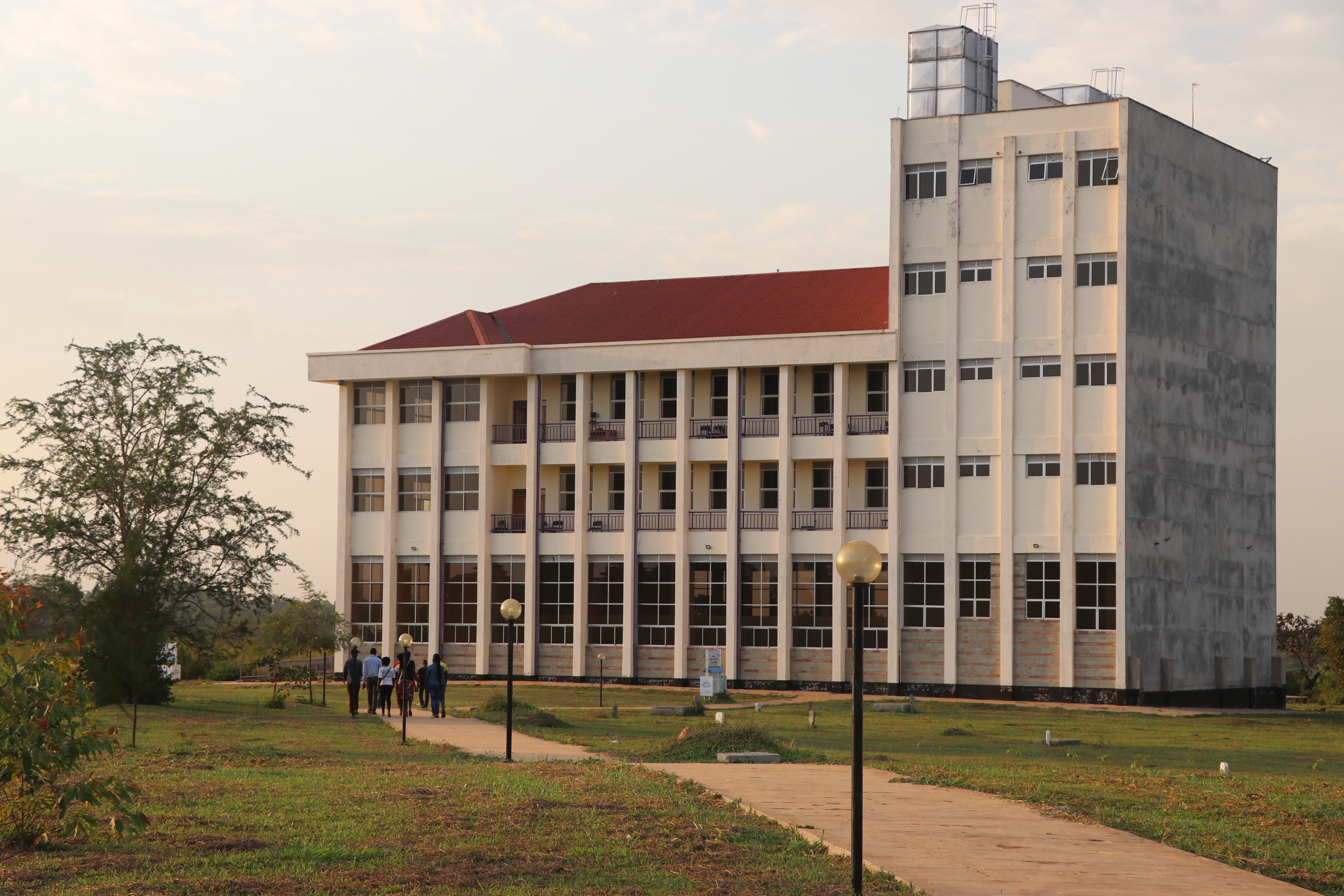
Alupe University Library

Alupe University (AU) is a Kenyan university located in Teso South Constituency, along Busia-Malaba road approximately 7km from Busia Town in Busia County.It is located in Western Kenya. The University was established through the Alupe University College Order 2015, which was in Gazette Notice Number 163 of 24 July 2015. It has a TVET institute which offers vocational and technical training. The University's school motto is "Bastion of knowledge".

== History ==
Alupe University College was established on 24 July 2015. It's history began with a community request in 2007 and developed into a fully chartered public University by 2022. It is the only public university in Busia County. It was originally the Alupe campus of Moi University and later changed to Alupe University College, a constituent college of Moi University. In 2022, the institution was awarded charter to become Alupe University.

The current Vice-Chancellor of the university is Professor Peter L. Barasa.
