= Chris Okemo =

Kenyan politician

Chrisantus Okemo is a Kenyan politician. He belongs to the Orange Democratic Movement and was elected to represent the Nambale Constituency in the National Assembly of Kenya since the 1997 Kenyan parliamentary election.
