= Matayos Constituency =

Matayos constituency is a sub-county of Busia County in the western province of Kenya. It is one of seven constituencies in Busia County. The constituency is along the Kisumu-Busia Highway and is mainly occupied by the Bakhayo, a sub-clan of the Luhya people. Being part of the lucrative investment grounds, the settlers in the region depend mainly on livestock and grains as their primary source of income. Additional contributions to the local economy include fishing and other agricultural activities. Matayos is the home of Amos Wako, the longest serving Attorney General in Kenya. The area MP is Geoffrey Makokha Odanga of the ODM party.
