= Shiphay Manor =

Manor house in Devon, England

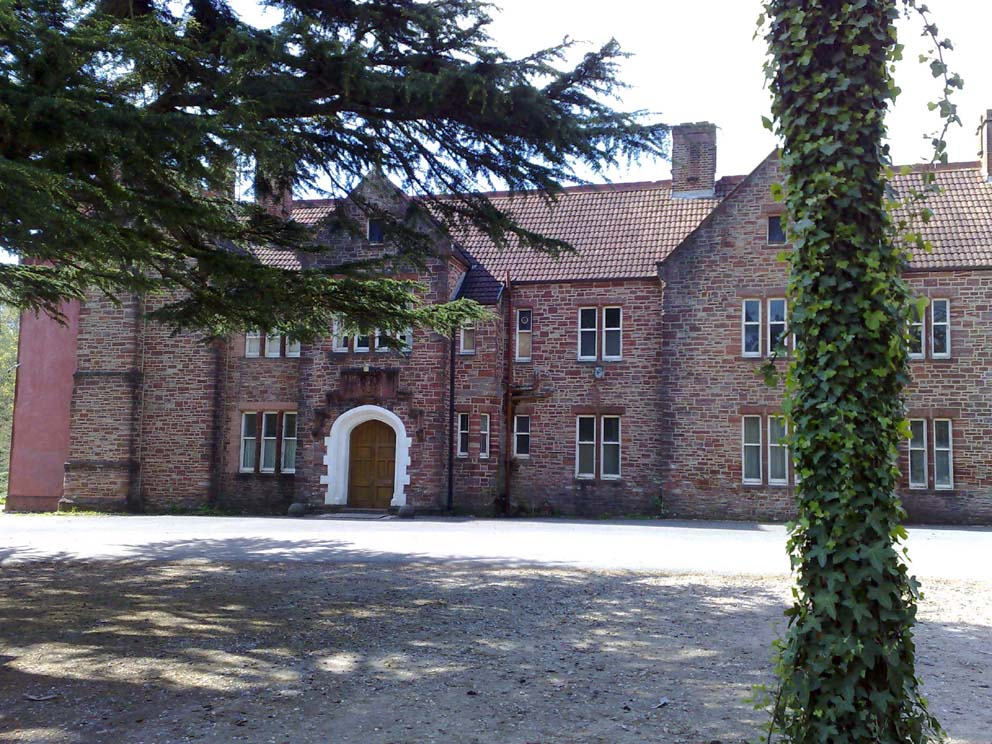

- Location within England

General information
- Location: Torquay, England
- Coordinates: 50.476°N 3.555°W
- Owner: TBGS

Shiphay Manor is a Manor house in Torquay, Devon, England. Originally a monastic grange for nearby Torre Abbey, the current house was built in 1884 of red sandstone rubble. Adjacent is a ruined barn which has been designated a Grade II listed building. The house has been used as a hotel, a riding school, night club and then school building.

== History ==
There is documentation regarding Shiphay Manor from the 16th century, apparently a monastic grange linked to Torre Abbey. A previous incarnation of the manor was erected in around 1665, the manor was sold to William Kitson of Painsford in 1740, and then torn down and rebuilt in 1884. In 1884, the rebuilt manor was created in red sandstone rubble, with moulded red brick chimney stacks. The roof was made of pantiles, ridged with terracotta. The front aspect is two storeys high, with an off-centre two-storey porch.

The nearby 15th century barn adjacent to the manor, which may have held a 12th-century chapel, has been designated Grade II listed status. The barn is constructed from grey sandstone rubble, and has fallen into ruin, currently without a roof. An outhouse built onto the barn in the 19th century did include a corrugated iron roof. The corrugated roof has since been removed.

The building has had several uses through the 20th century, including a country club hotel and a riding school. During the 1970s, the ground floor was boarded up. Soon after, the manor was used as a high class private members club, which was owned by the Mathews Brothers with live performances the venue was popular. In the early 1990s, the Mathews brothers closed all their nightclubs.

The Manor became the Torquay Girls' Grammar School 6th form block in the 1980s but is now part of Torquay Boys' Grammar School. The sale of disused land paying for its renovation. It is used as the Art, and Media Studies Department.
