= Wilberforce Oundo =

Kenyan politician

MP for Funyula Constituency
- Incumbent
- Assumed office 2017
- Preceded by: Paul Otuoma

Personal details
- Party: Orange Democratic Movement

Wilberforce Ojiambo Oundo is a Kenyan politician. He is a member of the Orange Democratic Movement and has been member of the National Assembly since 2017.

== See also ==
- 12th Parliament of Kenya
- 13th Parliament of Kenya
