= Bukoma =

- Location within Kenya
- Coordinates: 0.07°N 33.95°E
- Country: Kenya
- County: Busia County
- Time zone: UTC+3 (EAT)

Bukoma is a settlement in Kenya's Busia County.

== Climate in the Western Province ==
The climate is mainly tropical, with variations due to altitude. Kakamega district is mainly hot and wet most of the year, while Bungoma district is colder but just as wet. Busia district is the warmest, while the hilly Vihiga District is the coldest. The entire province experiences very heavy rainfall all year round, with the long rains in the earlier months of the year.
