= Friends School of Minnesota =

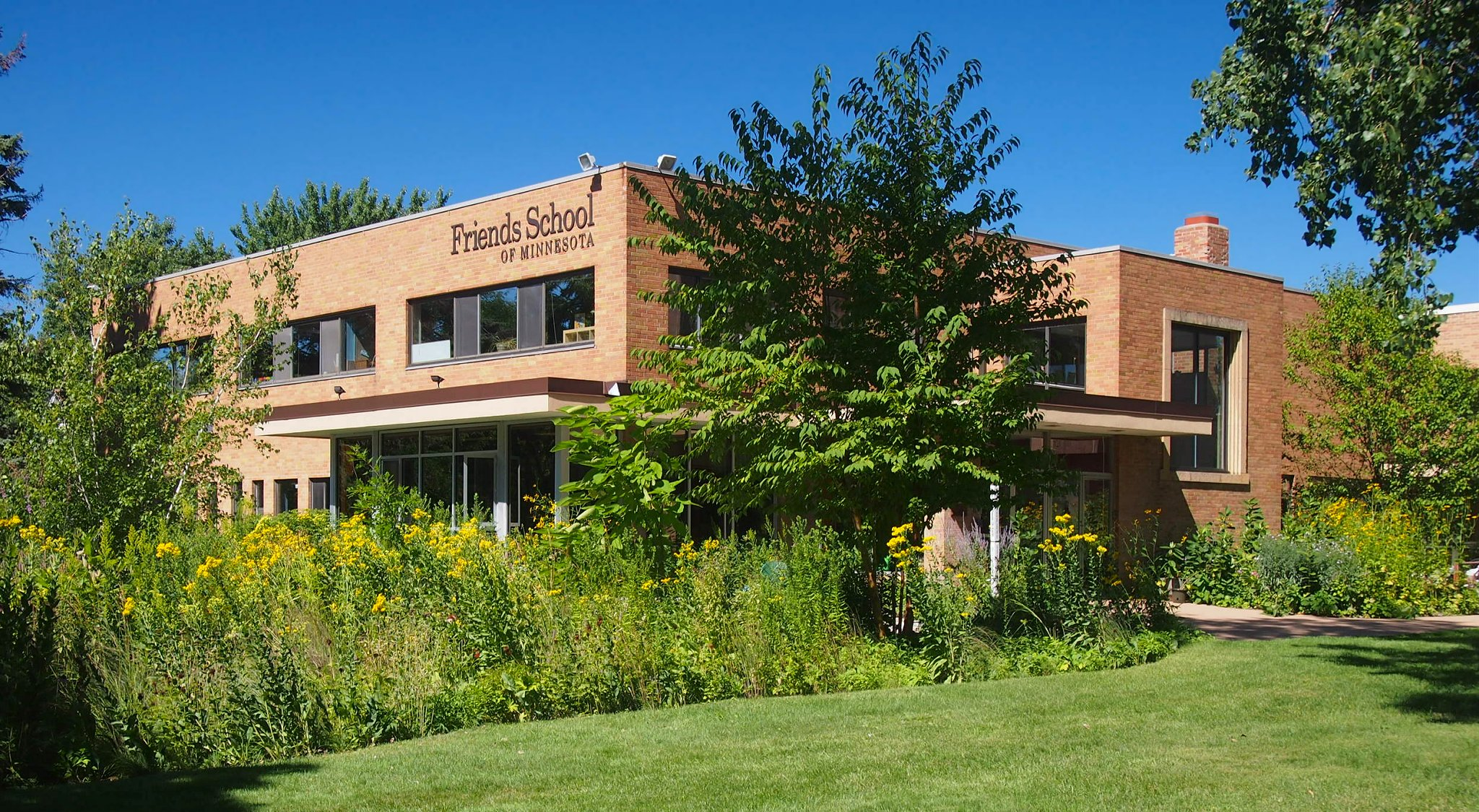
- Friends School of Minnesota from the southeast

Location
- 1365 Englewood Avenue; Saint Paul, Minnesota 55104; United States; 44°57′52″N 93°9′30″W

Information
- School type: Independent School
- Denomination: Quaker
- Established: 1988
- Head of school: Joe Mueller
- Teaching staff: 14 (as of 2022-2023 )
- Grades: Kindergarten-Eighth Grade
- Enrollment: 155 (as of 2022-2023)
- Average class size: 14
- Student to teacher ratio: 1:13.3 (as of 2022-2023)
- Colours: Green and White
- Athletics: Volleyball, Basketball, Soccer
- Mascot: The Dove
- Accreditation: Independent Schools Association of the Central States
- Website: fsmn.org

The Friends School of Minnesota (FSMN) is a Kindergarten through Eighth Grade (K-8) independent school located in Saint Paul, Minnesota, United States. The school was founded in 1988 by area Quakers and peace activists with the goal of meeting "children’s intellectual, emotional and spiritual needs in an environment that nurtures their social consciousness." FSMN is fully accredited through the Independent Schools Association of the Central States

== Philosophy ==
Like the many other Quaker schools in the United States, FSMN is "grounded in the practices and values of the Religious Society of Friends" (Quakers). Among these values are "simplicity, equality, non-violence, justice, and silent reflection.". To cultivate these values and to promote and encourage the spiritual, social, emotional, and physical development of the children, the school employs many of the tenets of progressive education—recognizing the need for children to play a part in their own education. This approach also fits with the Quaker belief that each person is granted a measure of "divine light" or wisdom, a center from which we are able to grow into our fullest potential. Friends School of Minnesota is a member of the Friends Council on Education.

== Quaker Tradition ==
In addition to the Quaker underpinning of the school's educational philosophy, FSMN also practices the Quaker method of holding a traditional meeting for worship, which is a 30-minute silent meeting once a week. All committee, staff and faculty meetings also start and end with silent contemplation. Decisions are made by consensus "in the manner of Friends". Additionally, FSMN has developed a conflict resolution program to help children work through their conflicts with each other in a non-violent, constructive manner.

== Demographics ==
The school's enrollment is typically between 155 and 168 students from around the Twin Cities metropolitan area. About 10 percent of the children at the school and less than 5 percent of the faculty and staff are Quakers or come from Quaker families. The school bylaws do, however, require that a majority of board members be practicing Quakers. Approximately one third of the students are non-caucasian, many students come from families headed by LGBT parents, and over a quarter of the students receive financial aid.
