= Prime Cabinet Secretary =

Cabinet office of Kenya

Prime Cabinet Secretary of Kenya
- Coat of arms of Kenya

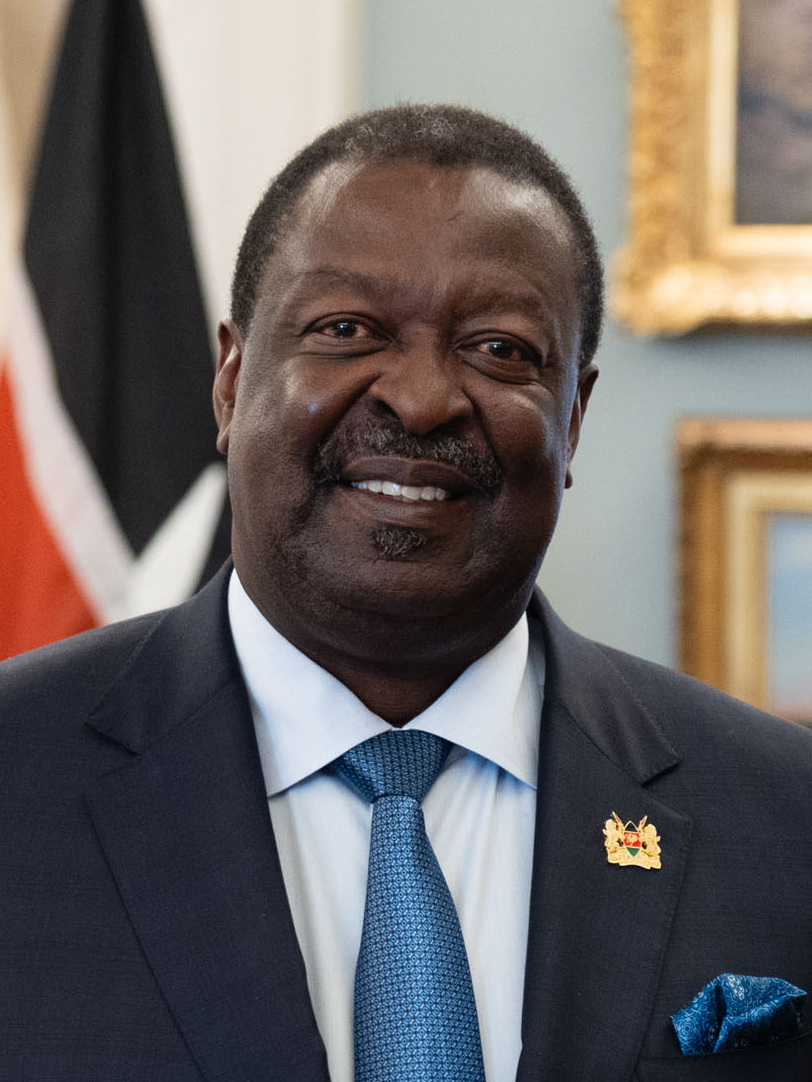
- Incumbent; Musalia Mudavadi since 27 October 2022
- Executive Office of the President
- Style: The Right Honourable
- Status: 3rd in Command in the Executive Arm of the Government
- Abbreviation: PCS
- Member of: Executive Office of the President
- Reports to: The president and deputy president
- Seat: Kenya Railways Headquarters, Nairobi
- Appointer: The president of Kenya
- Formation: 27 September 2022
- First holder: Musalia Mudavadi

The prime cabinet secretary of the Republic of Kenya is a post in the executive arm of the Government of Kenya created on 27 September 2022.

== History ==
On 27 September 2022, President William Ruto issued and signed Presidential Executive Order No. 1 of 2022 establishing the office of the prime cabinet secretary of the Republic of Kenya, and nominated Musalia Mudavadi to the position. During President Ruto's live address to the nation, he stated that the Office of the Prime Cabinet Secretary (PCS) is the most senior in the executive arm of the government after that of the president and deputy president. Mudavadi was officially sworn in as PCS at State House, Kenya on 27 October 2022.

== Functions ==
- Assist the president and the deputy president in the coordination and supervision of government ministries and state departments.
- In liaison with the Ministry responsible for Interior and National Administration, oversee the implementation of National Government policies, programs and projects.
- Chair and coordinate the national government's legislative agenda across all ministries and state departments in consultation with and for transmission to the Party/Coalition Leaders in Parliament
- Facilitate inter-ministerial coordination of cross-functional initiatives and programmers.
- Coordinate and supervise the technical monitoring and evaluation of government policies, programs and projects across ministries.
- Perform any other function as may be assigned by the president.

== Prime cabinet secretaries of Kenya ==
No.	Picture	Name (Birth–Death)	Took office	Left office	Political party
1		Musalia Mudavadi (born 1960)	27 October 2022	Incumbent	Amani National Congress

== See also ==
- Prime Minister of Kenya
