= Teso District, Kenya =

Teso District is a defunct administrative district in the former Western Province of Kenya. Its capital town was Amagoro, next to Malaba a border town between Kenya and Uganda. The district had a population of 5,000 in the 1999 census and an area of 559 square kilometres (216 sq mi). The district had one electoral constituency, Amagoro Constituency. Alupe Leprosy Hospital is located in this former district.

Local authorities (councils)
| Authority | Type | Population* | Urban pop.* |
| Malaba | Town | 2000 | 700 |
| Teso | County | 3000 | 0 |
| Total | - | 5000 | 700 |
* 1999 census. Source:

Administrative divisions
| Division | Population* | Urban population* | Population density* | Headquarters |
| Amagoro | 2000 | 3000 | 370 | |
| Amukura | 500 | 0 | 264 | Amukura |
| Angurai | 500 | 0 | 306 | |
| Chakol | 1500 | 0 | 393 | |
| Total | 5000 | 3000 | 325 (average) | - |
* 1999 census. Sources:,,
