= Chamasiri =

- Location within Kenya
- Coordinates: 0.74°N 34.39°E
- Country: Kenya
- County: Busia County
- Time zone: UTC+3 (EAT)

Chamasiri is a settlement in Kenya's Busia County, with a population of 120, close to the Ugandan border.

== Demographics ==
The population of Chamasiri was estimated to be around 120 people in the most recent census.
