= John Woolman School =

Information
- Religious affiliation: Quaker
- Established: 1963
- Closed: 2001

John Woolman School (JWS) was a private boarding Quaker high school founded in 1963 in Nevada City, California. It operated full-time until 2001, when it closed because of financial difficulties.

Since then, the facility has been adapted for use for short-term educational programs for teens and adults, as well as summer residencies. The centerpiece was the Woolman Semester, a single-semester residential program that provided an experiential education in the principles of peace, social justice and sustainability for high school juniors, seniors and post-graduates (gap year).

== Basis of education ==
Quaker education is based on two foundational beliefs: That every human being has the capacity to personally experience truth, and that discovering truth is a process of continuing revelation fostered by silent reflection. The John Woolman School and Woolman Semester's had a shared philosophy: each person has a unique and valuable perspective that must be heard in order to cultivate greater comprehension. As such, the Woolman Semester community used the following pedagogical practices:

Inquiry: Learning occurs primarily through queries, which are open ended questions that stimulate individual reflection and group dialogue.
Reflection: Learning occurs through a process of examining and understanding one’s own beliefs, thoughts and experiences—a sense of meta-knowing of oneself.
Collaboration: Classes are structured primarily in a discussion format to foster cooperative learning with classmates and teachers. Teachers are learning partners who act as guides and facilitators of the process. Small groups are often formed to foster deeper listening and consideration of each student’s views.
Experience: Learning occurs through direct experience—taking what has been gleaned through inquiry, reflection and collaboration with the group and applying it in one’s life, so that the learning becomes one’s own.

Woolman had a cooperative work-job program. Students (under adult supervision) were responsible for cooking meals, and cleaning the classrooms and public areas on a scheduled basis. Students also worked in the campus' organic garden and orchard.

The John Woolman School's mascot was the wombat. The students chose this animal in the late 1960s, in part because the creature is not a predator. Students also identified with, and tended to share, its nocturnal biological rhythm. Woolman students, faculty, and alumni also refer to themselves as Woolmanites.

== Curriculum ==
In the days of John Woolman School, a full complement of classes were offered from biology to creative writing and AP calculus. Since its rebirth in 2003, the Woolman Semester emphasized the topics of World Issues, Peace Studies, Environmental Science, and Nonviolent Communication. It also used the arts to promote learning, in ceramics and drawing classes.

== Campus ==
The campus consists of 230 acres (0.93 km^{2}) of wood- and grasslands, including eight cabins on the west side of campus, each able to house five students, and twelve A-frames on the east side of campus, each capable of housing two students. All cabins are heated with wood-burning stoves in the winter. Each residential area has a bath house, each containing four sinks, four toilets, and two showers.

The facility includes five main classrooms, a pottery and art building, and a large barn-shaped library. It is also used as the meeting house for the local Friends Meeting (Quaker). The dining hall has half of a welding gas tank, which is struck as a bell to call students and faculty to meals. Behind the Library/Meeting house is a multi-chambered step kiln. Houses and apartments have been built for use as faculty residences around the campus.

Natural aspects of the campus include the meadows and Mel's Pond, named after the man who dug it out. Many acres of forest and trails lead through the local area. The Crystal Tree is arrayed with crystals hung by students.

Until the winter of 1977-78, a large oak tree with a rope swing stood in a pasture near the center of campus. Songwriter Kate Wolf visited the school in 1977, and wrote a song called "Fly Away" about the rope swing tree, which appears on her album The Wind Blows Wild and on a DVD of one of her concerts.

In 2020, the Nevada County Board of Supervisors designated the site (which is located in Nevada County, California) as a county historic landmark.

== Notable Woolmanites ==
Carré Otis, super model
