= Mbale, Kenya =

- Town
- Location in Kenya
- Coordinates: 00°04′54″N 34°43′17″E
- Country: Kenya
- County: Vihiga County
- Elevation: 3,900 ft (1,200 m)

Population (2017 (Estimate))
  - Total: 60,000
- Climate: Af

Mbale is a town in Kenya and is the capital and largest town of Vihiga County. It is also called Maragoli, after the indigenous inhabitants of the area.

== Location ==
The town is located on the Kisumu–Kakamega–Webuye–Kitale Road, approximately 23 kilometres (14 mi), north of Kisumu, and about 26 kilometres (16 mi), south of Kakamega. The coordinates of Mbale, Kenya are: 0°04'54.0"N, 34°43'17.0"E (Latitude:0.081667; Longitude:34.721389).

== Population ==
Mbale's population is estimated at 60,000 people of different races and ethnicities, which include the Luhya, Kikuyu, Kisii, Luo and Asians.

== Overview ==
Mbale has five major hotels and four major bars that serve people from as far as Kisumu and Kakamega. Mbale has four major banks, namely Barclays Bank, Equity Bank, Co-operative Bank, and KCB Bank Kenya Limited. It also has one Sacco bank, namely Kakamega Teachers Sacco Society, which is yet to be officially launched but is operational at the moment. Mbale has over a hundred small businesses such as shops, tailoring, bread distribution, cyber cafe services, healthcare services, construction, real estate, property management and hotels. It is home to the annual Maragoli Cultural Festival, which is held every 26 December.

== Schools ==
The town has nearly a dozen primary schools, including Hambale Primary School, Idavaga Muslim Primary School, Shalom Academy and Mukuli Primary School. The five secondary schools are Mbale High School, St. Clares Maragoli Secondary School, Kegoye Friends' Secondary School and Mbihi Secondary School. The former Vihiga County Governor, Moses Akaranga is an alumnus of Mbale High School.

== Health ==
Mbale, Kenya is home to two hospitals; (a) Mbale Rural Provincial Health & Training Centre, and (b) Vihiga District Hospital

== Religion ==
There are many places of worship in the town, including The Salvation Army Church, Anglican, Episcopal, African Israel Church Nineveh, Muslim and Roman Catholic and others.
