= Funyula Constituency =

Funyula Constituency is an electoral constituency in Kenya. It is one of seven constituencies in Busia County. The constituency was established for the 1997 elections. At independence it was known as Busia Central represented in parliament by the Late James Machio till 1967 upon his death. During the resulting By-elections the seat was won by the Late Habil Kanani who lost the seat to Arthur Ochwada in the General Elections of 1969. Ochwada served one term and lost to Dr. Julia Ojiambo in the General Election of 1974. Dr. Ojiambo served two terms and lost Moody Awori in the snap General Elections of 1983.

Former vice-president Moody Awori used to represent Funyula constituency. Before the constituency was established, he had represented the Busia South and Samia constituencies (both now disestablished).

== Members of Parliament ==
Elections	MP	Party	Notes
1997	Moody Awori	KANU	
2002	Moody Awori	NARC	
2007	Paul Otuoma	ODM	
2018	Wilberforce Oundo	ODM	

Funyula was one time known by the name "Otoro", during its existence as a market center.

== Wards ==
Wards
Ward	Registered Voters	Local Authority
Bwiri	5,552	Busia county
Namboboto	3,381	Funyula town
Nangina	2,220	Funyula town
Odiado	1,044	Funyula town
Wakhungu	1,493	Funyula town
Total	31,953	
*September 2005.
