= Elsie K. Powell House =

Quaker center in New York, U.S.

Powell House
- Other names: PoHo
- Type: Conference and retreat center
- Religious affiliation: Religious Society of Friends, New York Yearly Meeting
- Location: Old Chatham, New York, United States; 42°25′24″N 73°34′25″W
- Campus: 57 acres (230,000 m^{2})
- Website: www.powellhouse.org

Powell House, named after Elsie K. Powell Sr., is the Quaker conference and retreat center of the New York Yearly Meeting of the Religious Society of Friends, located in Old Chatham, New York.

== Use ==
Powell House is used primarily for religious conferences and similar gatherings of members and attenders of meetings belonging to New York Yearly Meeting. It also serves as a venue for Yearly Meeting committees or their sponsored conferences. The programs include a wide variety of educational, inspirational, and organizational activities for youth and adults related to the religious, benevolent, and social concerns of the Religious Society of Friends. The facilities are available for use by affiliated Friends’ organizations and other religious or educational groups having interests compatible with those of Friends. Short-term sojourners are sometimes accommodated.

== History ==
In 1960, Elsie Powell donated residential property to New York Yearly Meeting. The annual meeting decided to establish a retreat center on the property.

Powell House celebrated its 40th anniversary celebration in 2000.

During 2008 and 2009, the Anna Curtis Center underwent renovations. The renovation included several energy-saving improvements such as the installation of solar panels and a radiant floor heating system. The renovations also expanded space for conference activities and increased the sleeping capacity of the facility. It also made the facility fully accessible to individuals with disabilities.

== Campus ==
Powell House's campus includes Pitt Hall; the Anna Curtis Center, a director’s residence; a youth directors’ residence, and fifty-seven acres of land with a campground and two wildlife ponds.

Pitt Hall is where the majority of adult conferences are held.

The Anna Curtis Center, also known as the Youth Center, is primarily used for youth conferences.

== Youth program ==
The youth program has conferences designed for several age groups. There are conferences for 4th and 5th graders, 6th through 8th, and 9th through 12th graders. Most youth conferences run from Friday dinner to Sunday lunch and have around 40 attenders.

WinterSong and EarthSong are special youth conferences the require both buildings due to the large attendance. Earthsong celebrates the arrival of spring and honors the seniors graduating from the program, while Wintersong celebrates warmth, community, and light during the winter season. These conferences are open to youth in grades 7 to 12.

=== Activities ===
Typical conferences consist of the following elements:

- Session: A time when the whole group gathers for discussion, games, or other activities.
- Small group discussions
- Free time
- Meals and snacks: The youth help with dishes, cooking, cleaning, and other tasks and learn a good work ethic.
- Work projects: The attendees are asked to help with some project that needs doing on the campus.
- Workshops: Attenders choose to attend a workshop. Adults from the Quaker community are often asked to lead workshops for the youth.
- Self space: A period in the middle of the conference set aside for relaxation and alone time.
- Quiet time: Just before bed time the group gathers to here a story and say good night.

=== Leadership in the youth program ===
At most youth conferences, there are typically only two adult leaders (the directors) and one adult presence (AP). Because most of the youth are eager to attend and fully engage in the program, there is very little need for authoritative figures. However, several Junior Councilors (JCs) are chosen for every 4th and 5th grade and 6th through 8th grade conference.

JCs are slightly older youth who also attend conferences themselves. Once a year, a JC training conference (JCT) is held, during which attenders learn leadership and mediation skills. JCs lead small group discussions, work projects, games, meal and snack crews, and workshops. They are also expected to set an example for the other youth and help maintain the community's safety and order.
