= Information and Communication Technology Authority =

Government agency in Kenya

- Company type: Government-owned corporation
- Industry: ICT For Development
- Founded: August 2013
- Headquarters: Nairobi, Kenya
- Key people: Hon. Edwin Ochieng Yinda, Chairman
- Website: www.icta.go.ke

The Information and Communication Technology Authority is a Kenyan Government Owned Corporation tasked with rationalising and streamlining the management of all the Information and Communication Technology (ICT) functions of the Government of Kenya. The ICTA has a broad mandate that entails enforcing ICT standards in government and enhancing the supervision of its electronic communication. The authority also promotes ICT literacy, capacity, innovation and enterprise in line with the Kenya National ICT Masterplan 2017.

The ICTA is a consolidation of three previously separate government agencies; the Information and Communication Technology Board of Kenya (ICT Board), the e-Government Directorate and the Government Information and Technology Services (GITS).

== Board of directors ==
- Hon. Edwin Ochieng Yinda (chairman)
- Ugas Mohammed
- Bertha Dena
- Professor Elijah Omwenga
- Professor Timothy Mwololo Waema
- Esther Njeri Kibere
- David Mugo
