= Luanda, Kenya =

Place in Kenya

Coordinates: 00°02′00″N 34°35′00″E

Luanda is a Municipality and former town in the Vihiga County of Kenya, and a significant business point in Bunyore, located along the Kisumu-Busia highway. It was one of the administrative divisions in Emuhaya district between 2007 and 2009. Luanda has grown over the past ten years. Currently, several banks, and supermarkets have established within the township. Luanda serves as the main town for Emuhaya and Luanda subcounties. The predominant tribe in Luanda are the Banyore people.

Luanda became a municipality on June 30th, 2026.

== Geography ==
Luanda is located a few kilometers from the Equator at Maseno, its geographical coordinates being 0° 0' 0" North, 34° 35' 0" East. As of 2019, the town had a population of 13,319 people.

Elevation is 1501 m.

== Education ==
Mill Hill Formation Centre provides a one-year course of formation for potential candidates to be admitted to the Mill Hill Missionaries or the Franciscan Missionaries of St Joseph.

== Transport ==
Luanda is also a transit point for road travellers connecting to various towns in Western Kenya. Major bus routes via Luanda include the Luanda-Maseno-Kisumu, Luanda-Siaya, Yala-Busia, Maseno-Kisumu, Ebwiranyi-Kombewa, Luanda-Emusire, Esiandumba-Akala-Bondo, Kima-Vihiga, Luanda-Kakamega, Mwichio-Emusire and Luanda-Yala through Es'saba, HaBuchichi and Ebuyangu.

== See also ==
- Railway stations in Kenya
