= Paul Otuoma =

Kenyan politician

Otuoma Paul Nyongesa (born 15 September 1966) is a Kenyan politician. He was a member of Orange Democratic Movement until 21 April 2017 when he tendered his resignation. He was elected to represent the Funyula Constituency in the National Assembly of Kenya since the 2007 Kenyan parliamentary election and was the minister for the Local Government from 2010 to 2013. He was a member of parliament for Funyula Constituency until August 2017 when he contested for gubernatorial seat for Busia County against his rival Sospeter Ojamoong but failed. Otuoma was born on 15 September 1966. He attended Khalsa primary school in Nairobi, Eastleigh High School in Nairobi from 1981 to 1984, and then went to Nairobi School from 1985 to 1986. Otuoma is a veterinarian by training, holding a Bachelor's of Veterinary Medicine from the University of Nairobi (1991), where he also earned an MBA in 2001. He is married with 5 children.

Paul Otuoma is the current and second governor of Busia County.
