= Namboboto =

Village in Kenya

Namboboto is small rural village in Busia County, Kenya. It is 35 km north of Lake Victoria. The Namboboto-Nambuku ward is the largest of the four wards in the Samia sub-county of Busia County. The people are of the Samia sub-tribe, a part of the Luhya tribe. They are predominantly subsistence farmers, growing maize, sorghum and cassava and by grazing animals.
