= Kaimosi =

Coordinates: 0°08′N 34°52′E

Kaimosi is a town in western Kenya, heavily influenced by Quakers. It is rich in agricultural activities, mostly tea farming and production of African leafy vegetables such Lisutsa, Likhuvi, Inderema, livokoi, Tsisakab etc. It contains a complex of learning institutions including Kaimosi Friends University, Kaimosi Teachers Training College, Kaimosi Theological College, Friends College Kaimosi, TVET Institute and Kaimosi Vocational Training Institute. There are a number of basic learning institutions too all within walking distance.

It is located along the C39 road, 15.7 kilometres east of Chavakali and 30 kilometres west of Kapsabet.

Writer Memba Ibrahim was born and raised in Kaimosi.

Editer (Allan Bushi)

== See also ==
- Kaimosi Friends Primary School
