= Kaimosi Friends Primary School =

Primary school in Kaimosi, Western Kenya

Coordinates: 0°07′37″N 34°50′47″E

Information
- Former name: Friends Africa Industrial Mission (1903-1904)
- Established: 1903; 122 years ago

Kaimosi Friends Primary School is one of the oldest institutions for formal education in Kenya. The primary school is located in Kaimosi in the Western Province.

== History and operations ==
The school was established in 1903 as the Friends Africa Industrial Mission by the Quaker missionaries of the United States, who left South Africa to spread Quaker mission activities in East Africa.

In 1904, the school became known as the Kaimosi Friends Elementary School and diversified learning programs to include reading, writing, carpentry and dressmaking.

The school caters to both day and boarding students.

== See also ==
- Education in Kenya
- List of boarding schools
- List of Friends schools
- List of schools in Kenya
