= Teso South Constituency =

Electoral constituency in Kenya

Teso South
- constituency for the Parliament of Kenya
- Teso South Constituency within Busia County

- Busia County within Kenya
- County: Busia
- Population: 168,116
- Area: 303 km^{2} (117.0 sq mi)

Current constituency
- Number of members: 1
- Party: UDA
- Member of Parliament: Mary Otucho Emaase
- Wards: 6

Teso South is a constituency in Kenya. It is one of seven constituencies in Busia County.

== Education ==
- Alupe University College
