= Vihiga County =

Coordinates: 0°4′N 34°40′E

- County
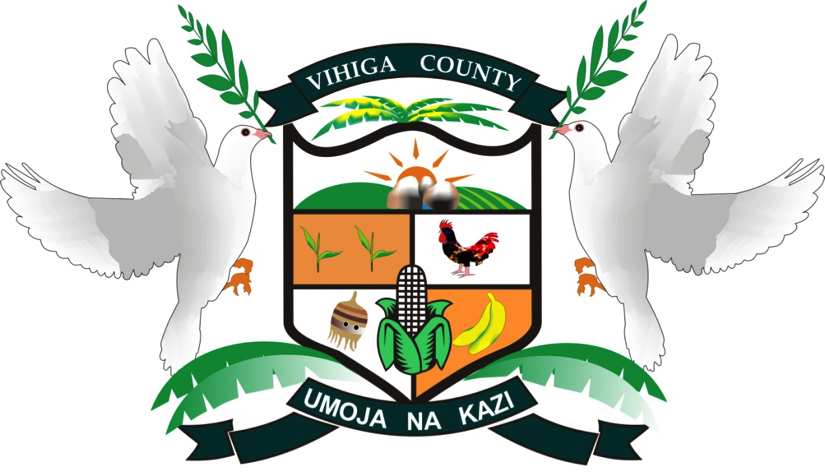
- Flag Coat of arms

- Location in Kenya
- Country: Kenya
- Formed: 4 March 2013
- Capital: Mbale

Government
  - Governor: Wilber Otichilo

Area
  - Total: 531.3 km^{2} (205.1 sq mi)

Population (2019)
  - Total: 590,013
  - Density: 1,111/km^{2} (2,876/sq mi)
- Time zone: UTC+3 (EAT)
- Website: vihiga.go.ke

Vihiga County is a County located in the former Western Province of Kenya with its headquarters in Mbale, the largest town in the county. According to the 2009 census, the county has a population of 554,622 and an area of 563 km^{2}. Vihiga was formerly a district, split from Kakamega District in 1990. The 2019 census recorded a population of 590,013, an increase of 35,391 from the 2009 count.

== Economics ==
The county is part of the Lake Region Economic Bloc (LREB) established in 2018 to foster regional economic, industrial, social, and technological collaboration.

== Religion ==
Religion in Vihiga County

Religion (2019 Census)	Number
Catholicism	22,331
Protestant	201,738
Evangelical Churches	240,628
African instituted Churches	88,697
Orthodox	4,913
Other Cristian	13,469
Islam	5.796
Hindu	31
Traditionists	1,148
Other	4,639
No ReligionAtheists	3,337
Don't Know	389
Not Stated	73

== Local authorities ==
Authority	Type	Population*	Urban pop.*
Vihiga	Municipality	98,189	19,067
Luanda	Town	68,157	8,757
Vihiga county	County	332,537	0
* 1999 census. Source:

== Administrative divisions ==
Division	Population*	Urban pop.*	Headquarters
Emuhaya	69,250	0	
Luanda	92,462	8.016	Luanda, Kenya
Sabatia	117,863	10.135	
Tiriki East	59,943	0	
Tiriki West	76,370	0	
Vihiga	82,995	6.881	Vihiga
* 1999 census. Sources: , ,

== Constituencies ==
The district has five constituencies:

- Emuhaya Constituency
- Hamisi Constituency
- Sabatia Constituency
- Vihiga Constituency
- Luanda Constituency

== Notable people ==
- Moses Mudavadi Cabinet minister
- Musalia Mudavadi Kenya's 7th Vice President of Kenya
- Priscilla Abwao (1924–2009), social worker and activist
