= Vihiga =

- Municipality
- Location within Kenya
- Coordinates: 00°03′00″N 34°43′30″E
- Country: Kenya
- County: Vihiga County

Population (2009)
  - Total: 118,696
- Time zone: UTC+3 (EAT)

Vihiga is a town in Kenya located on the eastern side of the Kakamega Forest.

== Geography ==
The town is located along the Kisumu-Kakamega highway, five kilometres north of the equator. Vihiga bears the same name as its county, Vihiga County. Vihiga municipality had a population of 118,696 according to the 2009 census and 95,292 in the 2019 census, a decrease of 23,404, 11%.

Vihiga municipality has six wards; two of them (Central Maragoli and Wamuluma) belong to Vihiga Constituency while the remaining four wards (Chavakali, Izawa, Lyaduywa and North Maragoli) are part of the Sabatia Constituency. In the 2002 general elections, all six civic seats were won by the National Rainbow Coalition.

== Demographics ==
Maragoli are the dominant ethnic group in the area. The town is also known as Maragoli with the Tiriki, Idakho and Banyore being the other ethnic groups in this locale. As a county, Vihiga has its administrative headquarters in Mbale township, located within the Vihiga municipality. Vihiga is also a name of one of its divisions. Other divisions include Sabatia, Hamisi, Lwanda and Emuhaya. The people living in Vihiga primarily identify themselves as "Maragoli" and speak a language called Maragoli. This language is quite distinct from other Luhya ethnic groups and was the first Luhya language used to translate the Bible. The majority of the Maragoli people were primarily converted into the Quaker denomination of Christians, which is practiced to this day.

== Notable people ==
- Enock Ondego
