= Sospeter Ojaamong =

Kenyan politician

1st Governor of Busia County
- In office 27 March 2013 – 25 August 2022

Assistant Minister of Labour and Human Resource Development
- In office 2008–2013
- Minister: John Kiyonga Munyes

Member of the Kenyan Parliament
- In office January 2003 – January 2013
- Constituency: Amagoro

Personal details
- Party: ODM
- Education: Kenyatta University (BEd)

Sospeter Odeke Ojaamongson is a Kenyan politician. He belongs to the Orange Democratic Movement and was elected to represent the Amagoro Constituency in the National Assembly of Kenya in the parliamentary election of 2007.

== Early life ==
Ojaamong was born in 1963 in Otimong Location, Chakol Division, of Teso South District in Busia County. He attended Kwang'amor Primary School in Amukura Division between 1972 and 1978, and later proceeded to St Paul's Amukura High School for both Ordinary and Advanced Level Secondary Education. He attended his O-level education between 1979 and 1983, and proceeded for his A-level education in the same school from 1984 to 1985. After his A-Level, Hon. Ojaamong qualified and joined Kenyatta University where he graduated with Bachelor of Education (Science) degree, majoring in Biology and Chemistry. He also holds a Post graduate Diploma in Business Management from the Kenya Institute of Management.

== Political career ==
Before 1992 Ojaamong was a teacher in a secondary school in Teso North where he was promoted to Deputy Principal, a post where he served for a year before resigning to join politics. During the 2007 general elections Ojaamong vied through Orange Democratic Movement and was elected to represent the Amagoro Constituency in the National Assembly of Kenya since the 2007 Kenyan parliamentary election. In the 4 March 2013 elections, He was elected as the first governor of Busia County. In the coalition government of 2008–2013, he served as an assistant minister for labour. He was reelected as governor in the 2017 general elections beating his closest competitor Hon.Paul Otuoma.

== Affairs and Scandals ==
In 2014, Ojaamong was sued for failing to pay his child support. He was accused of sending messages with profane words to the mother, Njagi Nyaboke, of his out of wedlock children. The woman released a string of messages that showed the issue has been ongoing since 2011. However, this was not the first time Ojaamong was having domestic issues, he was charged at the Makadara Law Courts on 31 October 2003 for assault on his then wife with whom he has since divorced resulting in a child custody battle.

On 4 September 2015, Governor Sospeter Ojaamong's houses were raided by anti-corruption officials. The governor later claimed these were 'political instigated' as he had done nothing wrong. However, EACC maintained that they were within the law. Computers and Files related to an ongoing court case were confiscated from the governors home and offices.,
