= Busia County =

Coordinates: 0°26′N 34°9′E

Base
- County
- Busia County
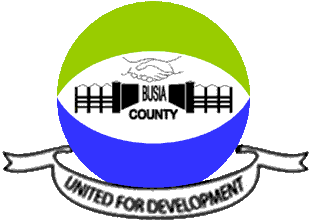
- Flag Coat of arms

- Location in Kenya
- Country: Kenya
- Formed: 4 March 2013
- Capital and largest town: Busia, Kenya

Government
  - Type: devolved government
  - Governor: Paul Otuoma
  - Member of Kenyan senate: Okiya Omutatah
  - County commissioner: Jacob Narengo

Area
  - Total: 1,628.4 km^{2} (628.7 sq mi)

Population (2019)
  - Total: 893,681
  - Density: 548.81/km^{2} (1,421.4/sq mi)
- Demonym: Busian
- Time zone: UTC+3 (EAT)
- Website: busiacounty.go.ke

Busia is a county in the former Western Province of Kenya. The capital and largest town is Busia, Kenya. Busia County is located directly east of the border town of Busia, Uganda, and borders Lake Victoria to the southwest, Siaya County to the southeast, and Bungoma County and Kakamega County to the east. The county is composed of six sub-counties, and had a population of 893,681 as of the most recent census in 2019.

Beginning in 1994, Busia became an epicenter of economic research as the location of one of the first successful randomized controlled trials in development economics, evaluating the efficacy of a school-based deworming program in improving health and educational outcomes. The research inspired the Deworm the World Initiative, which since 2014 has provided 1.8 billion deworming treatments to children around the world. Dean Karlan, chief economist of the United States Agency for International Development, has described Busia as the "birthplace for this [the RCT] movement", with more than 27 experiments ongoing as of 2024.

== Etymology ==
Busia County is part of Western Kenya. It is inhabited by two cultural communities commonly known as the Iteso (an extension of the Ateker Community that expansively resides in Uganda) and the Luhya community (Made up of different subtribes like the Abahayo, Samia, Wanga). Prior to being a county, it was known as Busia district before more districts were created by then President Mwai Kibaki. Busia County borders Uganda to the west. The Samia people of Busia are the same community as those of Uganda Busia district. There has been an outcry from the Samia people on why the colonial government decided to cut and separate them placing them in different countries.

== Geography ==
Busia County borders Bungoma County to the north, Kakamega County to the east, Siaya County and Lake Victoria to the south east and south respectively. Busia with approximately 1700 square kilometers is bordered to the south by Lake Victoria with some rivers pouring water into it. the rivers include River Nzoia in Budalangi and River Sio in Samia. There are several hills in Nambuku, Odiado Hills and Funyula. Several swamps are also located across the county with species such as crocodiles, hippos, and multiple types of fish. There are also some leopards and antelopes that are usually spotted across the county.

== Climate ==
The county's climatic conditions are greatly affected by Lake Victoria which borders it to the south western part. We have short and long rains. The main type of rainfall experienced in the county is convectional rainfall. Busia often experiences a hot and wet climate.

== Lakes and rivers ==
- Lake Victoria
- River Sio
- River Malaba
- River Nzoia
- River Akanyo

== Religion ==
Most residents are Christian with some Muslims and believers in traditional African religions.

Religion (2019 Census)	Number
Catholicism	266,299
Protestant	257,869
Evangelical Churches	246,936
African Instituted Churches	59,847
Orthodox	3,070
Other Christian	18,431
Islam	16,909
Hindu	164
Traditionists	1,150
Other	8,904
No Religion/Atheists	6,537
Don't Know	681
Not Stated	59

== Language ==
The national languages of Kenya are English and Swahili. In Busia county, Swahili is commonly used but most residents speak their native mother tongue. This is either the Luhya or Iteso language.

== Demographics ==
Busia county has a total population of 893,681 persons. Of this 426,252 are female, 467,401 are male, and 28 people were reported as intersex. The county has a population density of 527 persons with an average household size of 4.5 persons.

Population distribution per Sub-county
Sub-County	Population
Bunyala	85,977
Matayos	142,408
Butula	140,334
Nambale	111,636
Samia	107,176
Teso North	138,034
Teso South	168,116
Total	893,681

Historical population
Year	Pop.	±%
1979	297,841	—
1989	401,658	+34.9%
1999	552,099	+37.5%
2009	743,946	+34.7%
2019	893,681	+20.1%

Though most residents of Busia County are ethnically Luhya, there is also a substantial population of Luo and Iteso residents.

== Law and government ==
=== Administrative units ===
Busia County is made up of seven administrative sub-counties, thirty-five county ward assemblies, sixty locations and one hundred and eighty-one sub-locations.

Sub-counties

- Nambale Constituency
- Butula Constituency
- Funyula Constituency
- Budalangi Constituency
- Matayos Constituency
- Teso North Constituency
- Teso South Constituency

=== County government ===
Sospeter Ojaamong is the former governor elected into office since 2013 to 2022 and thus not eligible to run for the seat.The current governor is Paul Nyongesa Otuoma. He was deputised by Kizito Osore Wangalwa in his first term and now he is deputised by Moses Okhoba Mulomi. Amos Wako Sitswila has been Busia senator since 2013 after being elected as the first senator. Florence Mwikali Mutua is the current women representative after taking office in 2013. The legislation in the county is done by the county assembly, it plays the oversight role of the executive, It comprises 53 members (35 elected representing 35 wards of Busia county and 18 nominated members mostly women). It is chaired by the speaker who is elected by the assembly currently Frederick Wafula Odilo.

==== Executive ====
County governor, deputy county governor and Busia county departments headed by county executive committee members and chief officers.

==== Legislature ====
Busia county assembly comprises 35 elected MCA and nominated MCA the assembly is chaired by county assembly speaker. Bernard Wamalwa served as the first county assembly speaker until 2022 where he was succeeded by Fredrick Wafula Odilo.

==== Judiciary ====
The judiciary of Busia is exercised by Kenyan judiciary. There is Busia law court located in the town of Busia.

== Health ==
Busia County has a total of 81 health facilities, out of this 1 county referral hospital, 6 sub-county hospitals, 12 health centres, 49 dispensaries, 10 Medical Clinics, 6 Nursing Homes and 1 in the other categories.

Common diseases in the county include Malaria, Respiratory Diseases, and diarrhoea.

== Education ==
Busia county has a total of 735 pre-primary schools, 551 primary schools, 152 secondary schools. As at 2014 the county had an enrolment 255,008 students in primary schools and 41,332 students in secondary schools.

Alupe University College is the only public university in Busia County.

== Economy ==
The county is part of the Lake Region Economic Bloc (LREB) established in 2018 to foster regional economic, industrial, social, and technological collaboration.

== Transport and infrastructure ==
The county has 470 km of earth roads, 740 km of murram roads and 312 km of bitumen roads. A total of seven postal offices are spread across the county with 3,200 letter boxes installed, 2,284 letter boxes rented and 916 letter boxes vacant.

== Services and urbanisation ==
Stats for Busia County
County	Stats for the County (Per cent)
Urbanisation	16.4
Literacy	56.7
Attending School (15-18 Yrs)	78.1
Paved Roads	4.9
Good Roads	58.6
Electricity Access	6
Poverty Rate	66.7
Stats for the County

Source: USAid Kenya

== Villages and settlements ==
- Bujwane
- Bukoma
- Bunyala
- Busike
- Chamasiri
- Chelelemuk
- Debani
- Eburemia
- Galafahi
- Idokho
- Bukhwamba
- Bukhulungu
- Kholokhongo
- Kwangamor
- Makhoma
- Mbuvu
- Namabusi
- Namboboto
- Namiaso
- Nangina
- Bukanga
- Mubwokhola
- Budebu
- Apama
- Atapar
- Buteba
- Ojame
- Morototo
- Omoloi
- Gara
- Kamolo
- Lwanya
- Akanyo
- Budakwa
- Buduma
- Budunga
- Buhuyi
- Bukati
- Bukhalalire
- Bukhuma
- Bukhwaku
- Bukuyudi
- Bulemia
- Bulwani
- Bumwaya
- Butula
- Bumagunda
- Bumakhudu
- Bumala 'A'
- Bumala 'B'
- Bumutiru
- Busiada
- Butunyi
- Bwaliro
- Chengo
- Dadira
- Elukhari
- Elwanya
- Enakaywa
- Esibina
- Igula
- Ikonzo
- Indangalasia
- Isongo
- Khumuruka
- Khunyangu
- Kingandole
- Lugare
- Lugulu
- Madola
- Makwara
- Malanga
- Masendebale
- Mung'abo
- Mung'ambwa
- Murumba
- Musibiriri
- Nambale
- Namusala
- Nango
- Nyalara
- Nyapera
- Ogalo
- Sibembe
- Sigulu
- Sikarira
- Sikoma
- Sikura
- Simakola
- Sinywangokho
- Siribo
- Siwololo
- Tingolo

== See also ==
- Lake Victoria
