= List of University of Turin, Faculty of Law people =

The following is a list of famous scholars, practitioners, alumni and others affiliated with the storied University of Turin, Faculty of Law:

== Notable alumni and former academics ==
- Luigi Einaudi
- Norberto Bobbio
- Piero Gobetti
- Enrico di Robilant
- Vladimiro Zagrebelsky, European Court of Human Rights Judge
- Anna di Robilant, alum and law professor at Boston University School of Law
- Fernanda Nicola, professor of law at American University, Washington College of Law
- Kakai Kissinger (1975–), UNITO law alum, is a Kenyan human rights activist and attorney.

== Twentieth century ==
- Pitigrilli, pseudonym for Dino Segre (1893–1975) (UNITO Law, class of 1916), an Italian writer.
- Mario Einaudi (1905–1994), law faculty alum and chair of Cornell University Government Department from 1951 to 1956 and again from 1959 to 1963.
- Luciana Frassati Gawronska (1902–2007), was an Italian writer and author.
- Gustavo Rol (1903–1994), noted parapsychologist.
- Fernando de Rosa (1908–1936), a former UNITO Law student who attempted to assassinate Umberto II of Italy in Brussels on 24 October 1929.
- Giovanni Palatucci (1909–1945) was an Italian police official who saved thousands of Jews from being deported to Nazi extermination camps.
- Raf Vallone (1916–2002), law faculty alum and famous Italian actor.

=== Nineteenth century ===
- Clemente Solaro, Count La Margherita (1792–1869), a famous Piedmontese statesman.
- Bartolomeo Gastaldi (1818–1879), a law faculty alum who went on to become a famous Italian geologist and palæontologist, and one of the founders of the Club Alpino Italiano.
- Giuseppe Giacosa (1847–1906), law faculty alum, was a famous Italian poet, playwright and librettist.
- Lidia Poët (born 1855 in Pinerolo, Piedmont) was the first modern female Italian advocate. Her disbarring led to a movement to allow women to practice law and hold public office in Italy.

=== Eighteenth century ===
- Carbo Sebastiano Berardi (1719–1768), famous canon law scholar.

== Notable current academics ==
- Gianmaria Ajani
- Roberto Caranta
- Raffaele Caterina
- Sergio Chiarloni
- Mario Dogliani
- Fausto Goria
- Michele Graziadei
- Edoardo Greppi
- Enrico Grosso
- Ugo Mattei
- Pier Giuseppe Monateri
- Paolo Montalenti
- Ugo Pagallo
- Marco Ricolfi
- Rodolfo Sacco
- Gustavo Zagrebelsky

== See also ==
- Guglielmo Gulotta, Professor of Juridical Psychology at the University of Turin, Faculty of Psychology, and a criminal barrister of the Milan Court.
