= Hastings International and Comparative Law Review =

- Discipline: International law
- Language: English

Publication details
- History: 1976-present
- Publisher: UC Hastings College of the Law (United States)
- Frequency: Biannual

Standard abbreviations
- Bluebook: Hastings Int'l & Comp. L. Rev
- ISO 4: Hastings Int. Comp. Law Rev.

Indexing
- ISSN: 0149-9246

Links
- Journal homepage

Hastings International and Comparative Law Review (HICLR) is one of the oldest international law journals in the United States, and was established in 1976. It is published by law students through the O'Brien Center for Scholarly Publication, the publishing foundation for UC Hastings. HICLR publishes articles on the topics of international, comparative, and foreign law. It also publishes student-written work (termed "notes") on recent developments in international law. The current Editor-in-Chief is Jacklin Lee.

Notable international-legal figures that have published articles in HICLR include: current Legal Adviser of the Department of State, Harold Koh; former Under Secretary of the Treasury for Terrorism and Financial Intelligence, Jimmy Gurulé; founder of the Association of Humanitarian Lawyers, Karen Parker; and premier legal scholars Julius Stone and George Bermann.

Two distinguished former Faculty Advisors of HICLR are comparative legal scholar, Rudolf Schlesinger and former Judge Advocate General of the United States Army, Major General George S. Prugh. The current HICLR Faculty Advisors are Professors Naomi Roht-Arriaza, Ugo Mattei, Joel Paul, Bill Dodge and Richard Boswell.

The journal currently publishes two issues per year, Winter and Summer. HICLR articles are commonly cited under the abbreviation "Hastings Int'l & Comp. L. Rev." Furthermore, HICLR hosts an annual symposium where a series of experts discuss a pressing issue in international law. Recent topics have included Japanese legal reform and Palestinian access to international courts.
