= Karen Parker =

Karen Parker may refer to:

- Karen L. Parker, American journalist
- Karen Parker (lawyer), American attorney
- Karen Parker (All My Children)
- Karen F. Parker, American sociologist and criminologist
- Karen Parker, backing vocalist with The Jesus and Mary Chain on "Just Like Honey"
