= IUC =

IUC may refer to:

- International Union of Crystallography, founded in 1948
- International University College of Turin, a university located in Torino, Italy
- International University of Chabahar, a university located in Chabahar, Iran
- Inter-University Center for Japanese Language Studies, a Japanese language school located in Yokohama, Japan
- IntraUterine Contraceptive, a hormonal contraceptive
