= Center for Transnational Legal Studies =

UK academic institution

Coordinates: 51.518357°N 0.113811°W

- Type: Private
- Established: 2008
- Faculty: 18
- Students: 60-100 per term
- Undergraduates: 0
- Postgraduates: 60-100 per term
- Location: London, England
- Campus: Central London
- Website: Center for Transnational Legal Studies

The Center for Transnational Legal Studies (CTLS) is a global educational center for the study of transnational law. The Center was founded in London in October 2008 as an initiative by Georgetown University Law Center, providing educational services and student resources. It was constituted as a joint venture between several leading law schools from around the world, each contributing faculty and students to the center. The Center's founding partner institutions are Georgetown University Law Center, City University of Hong Kong, King's College London, the University of Melbourne, National University of Singapore, ESADE, Fribourg University, Hebrew University of Jerusalem, the University of Torino, and the University of Toronto. The Universities of Mexico, Chile, Korea, Colombia, New Zealand, Portugal, the Netherlands, India, China and Russia joined later. The Center also has several affiliate institutions, including Bucerius Law School. David D. Cole and Nina Pillard were the Center’s inaugural academic co-directors.

In 2011, the Georgetown University Law Center received the Institute of International Education’s Andrew Heiskell Award in the International Partnerships category for the CTLS.

The CTLS facilities are located in London at Bush House, North West Wing, Aldwych, on King's College London's Strand Campus. Students and faculty have access to King's College Law Library among other King's College London facilities.

The Center's curriculum was developed by an Academic Council of faculty from all of the founding law schools and all courses address topics in transnational or comparative law, legal theory or legal practice. designed for students intent on transnational careers.

Academics from the CTLS have also offered public lectures on international legal topics, and in addition to the Center's main academic term program, offers administrative support for the Georgetown Law summer program in London. CTLS students participate in the annual Willem C. Vis International Commercial Arbitration Moot and the Nelson Mandela World Human Rights Moot Court Competition. There are also regular visits to the United Kingdom Supreme Court and the United Nations institutions in Geneva. The CTLS awards students who successfully complete the program with a Certificate in Transnational Legal Studies and a transcript from Georgetown Law with a course breakdown. Each year between 150 and 175 students participate in the program which the credits and grades given are recognized by their respective law schools academic requirements. Admission into the CTLS are through nomination from participating partner law schools and a limited available places are provided to students from non-partner institutions.

The Georgetown University and the King’s College Bachelor of Law LL.B/LL.M dual degree program, is a four-year dual degree program spent with the first two years at the King’s College taking mandatory and elective LL.B courses, then in the third year, fall semester is spend in Washington at Georgetown Law starting LL.M coursework, and the spring semester at the CTLS completing the LL.M courses. The final year is then send at the King’s College completing the remaining LL.B. mandatory and elective courses.

== Locations ==
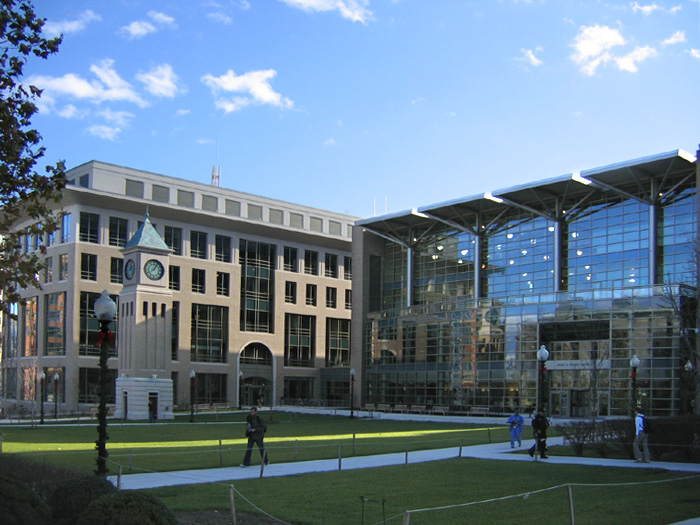
Georgetown University

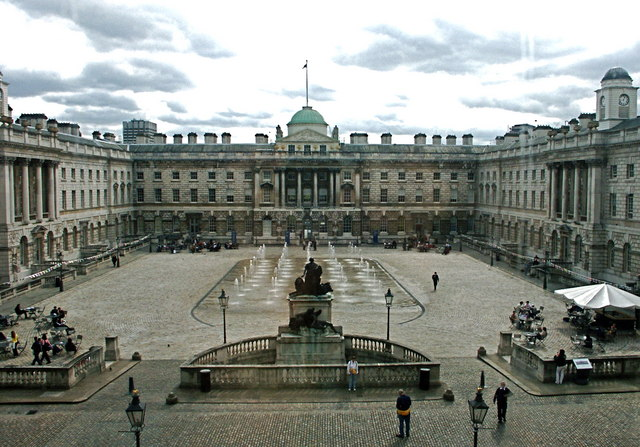
King's College London

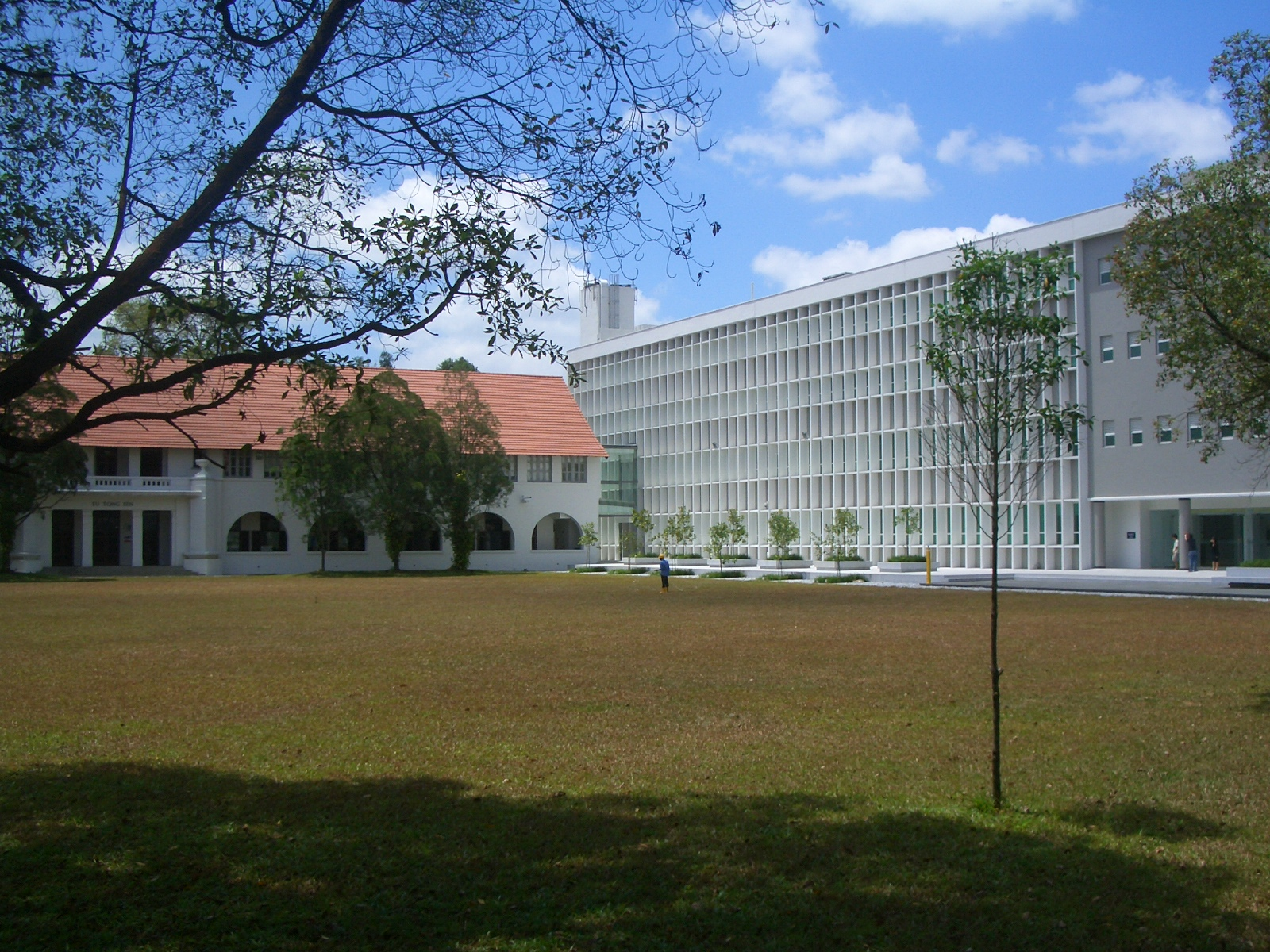
National University of Singapore

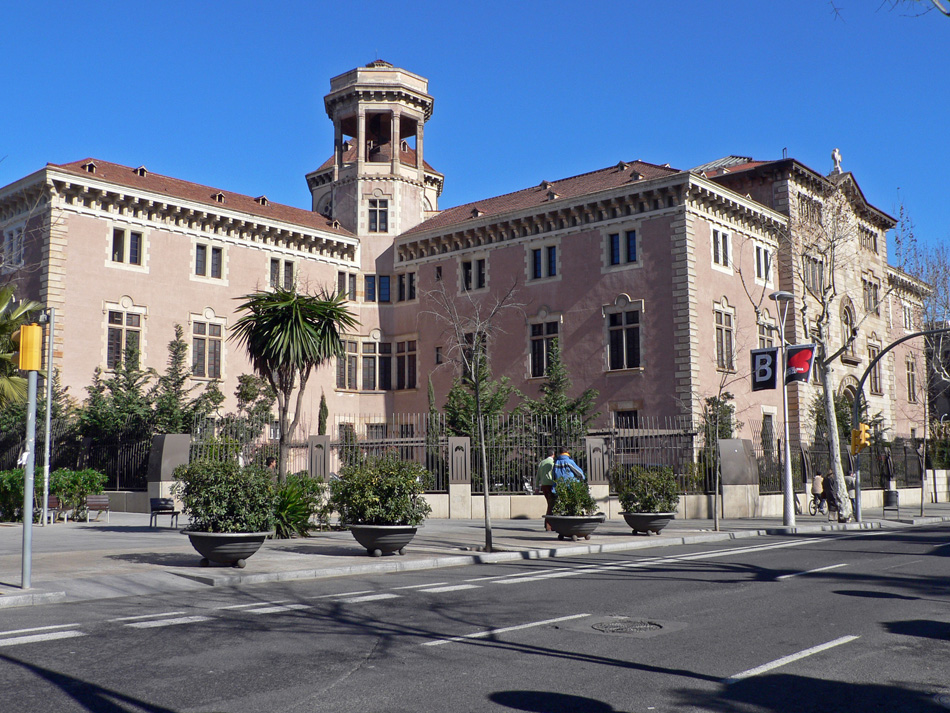
ESADE

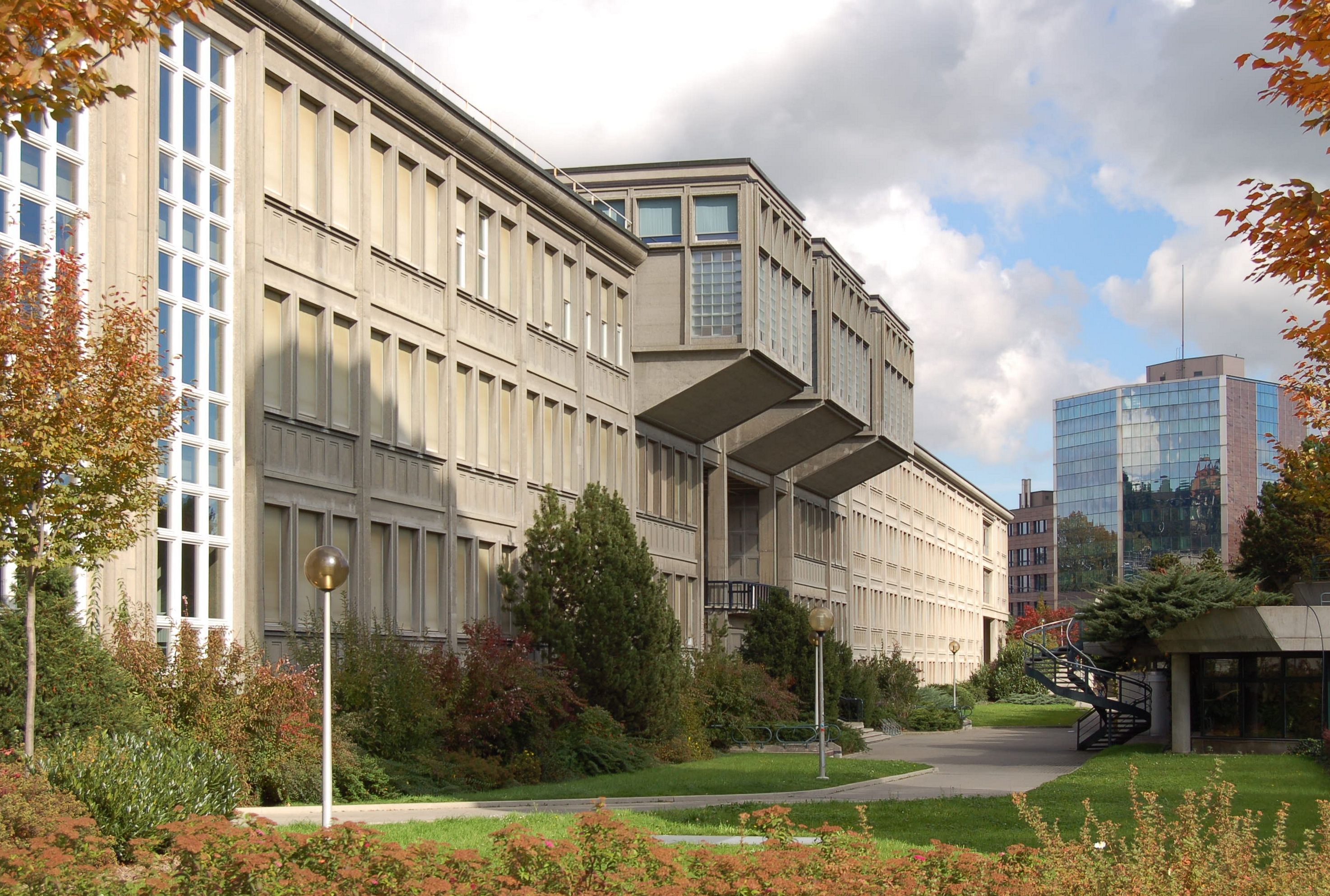
University of Fribourg

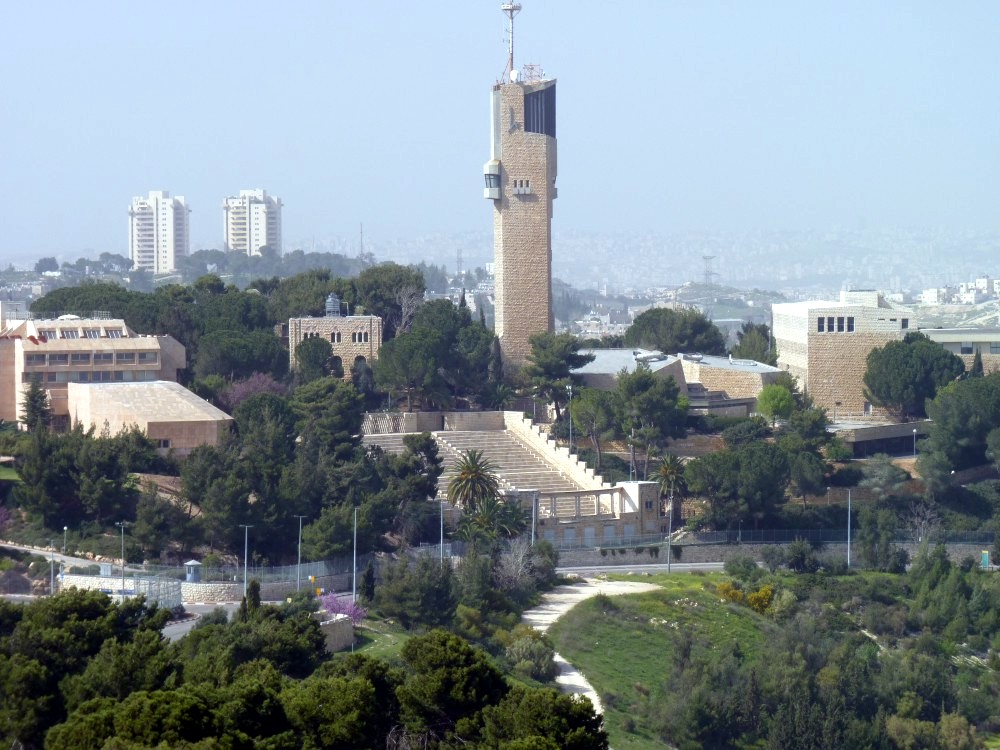
Hebrew University of Jerusalem

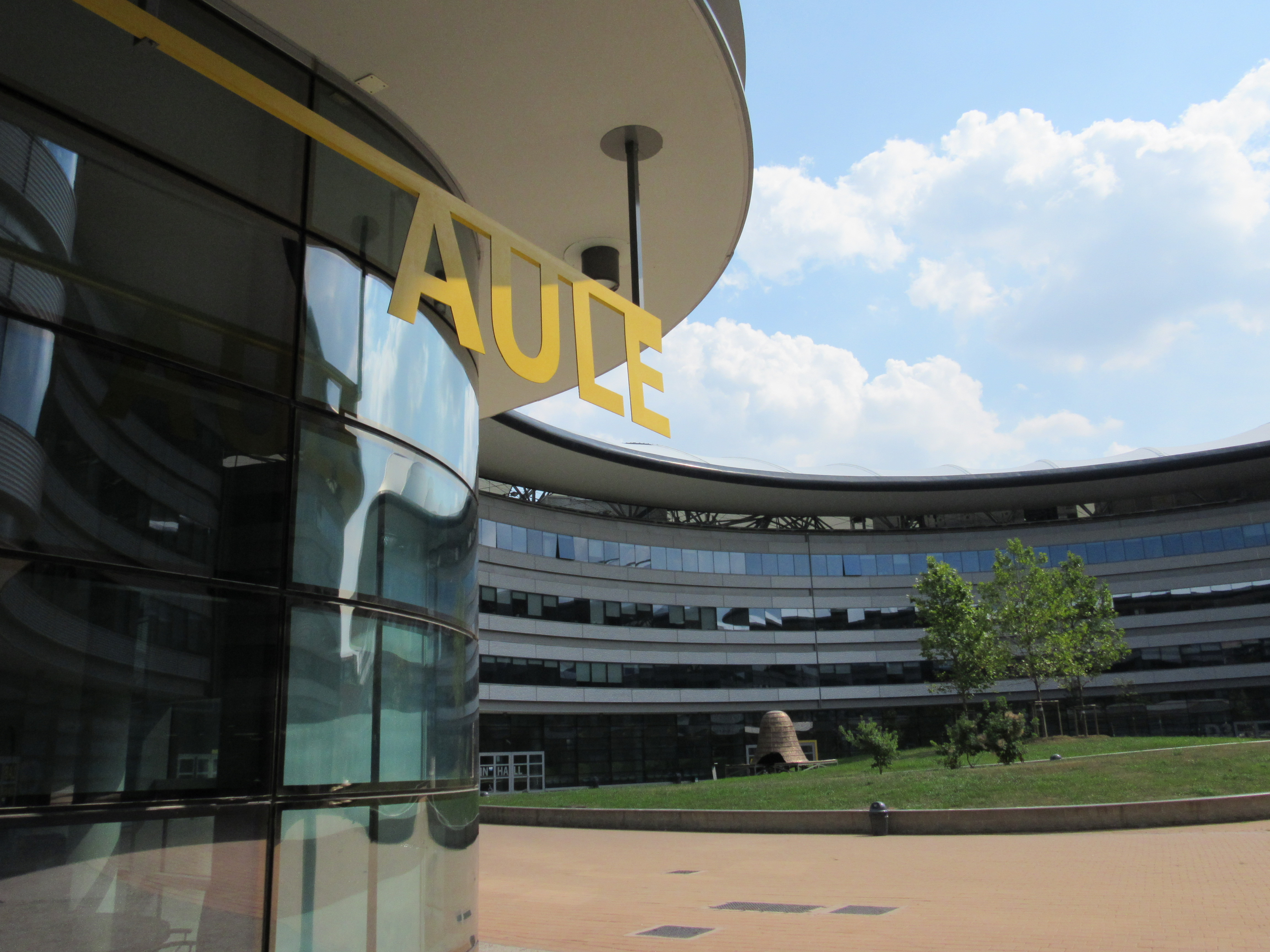
University of Turin

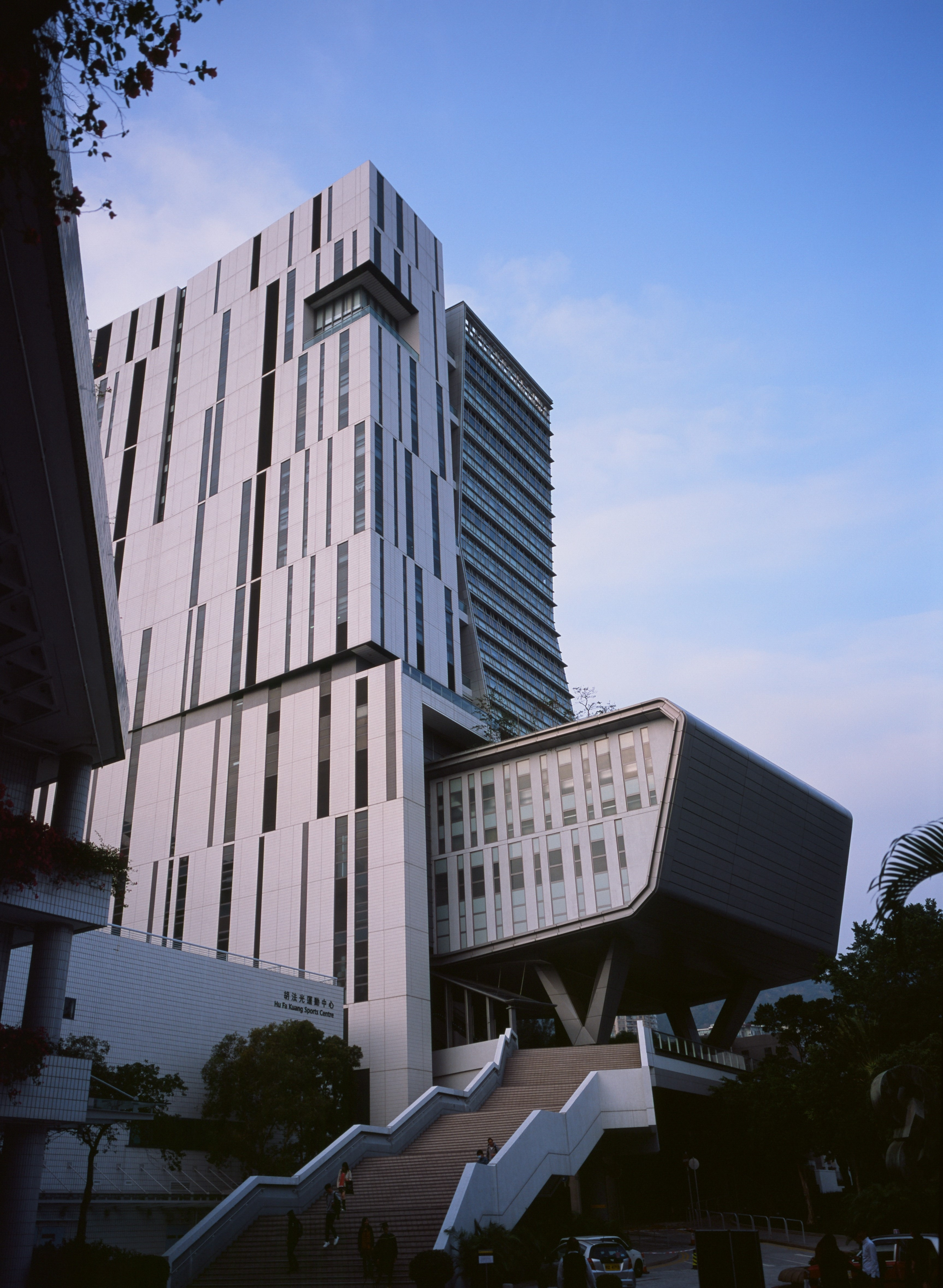
City University of Hong Kong

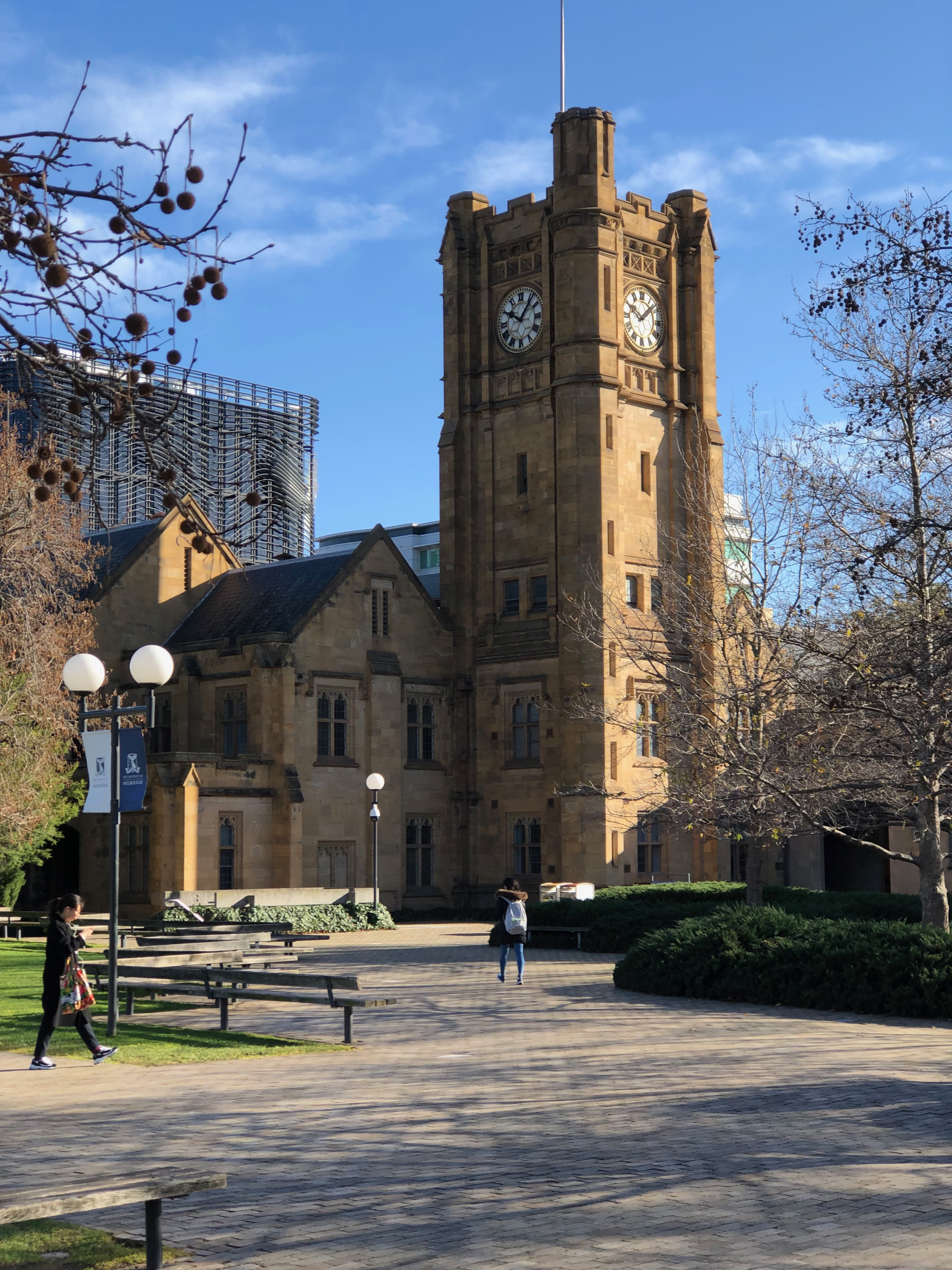
University of Melbourne

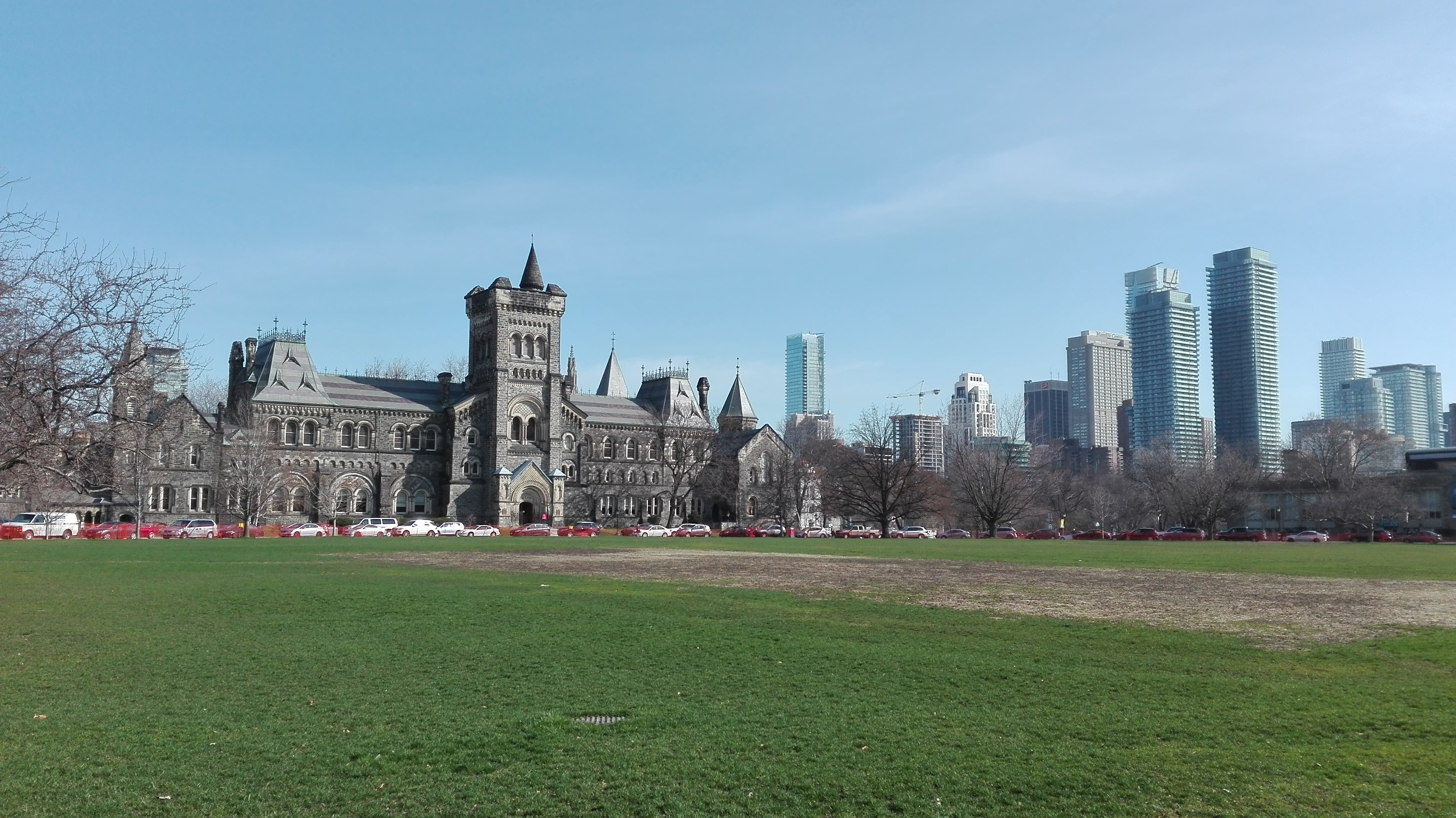
University of Toronto
