= Centre of Advanced Studies on Contemporary China =

Italian research institute

Coordinates: 45.068112°N 7.688131°E

Centre of Advanced Studies on Contemporary China Centro di Alti Studi sulla Cina Contemporanea
- Research type: Private foundation / Research institute

The Centre of Advanced Studies on Contemporary China (CASCC) is a research institute headquartered in Turin, Italy. It is incorporated as a private foundation, established by the University of Turin, the University of Eastern Piedmont, the Politecnico of Torino, the Italian Ministry of Foreign Affairs and several other public and private institutions. The CASCC has strong collaboration with the China-EU Law School.

== See also ==
- Chinese law
- University of Turin, Faculty of Law
