= Mario Einaudi =

Italian political scientist

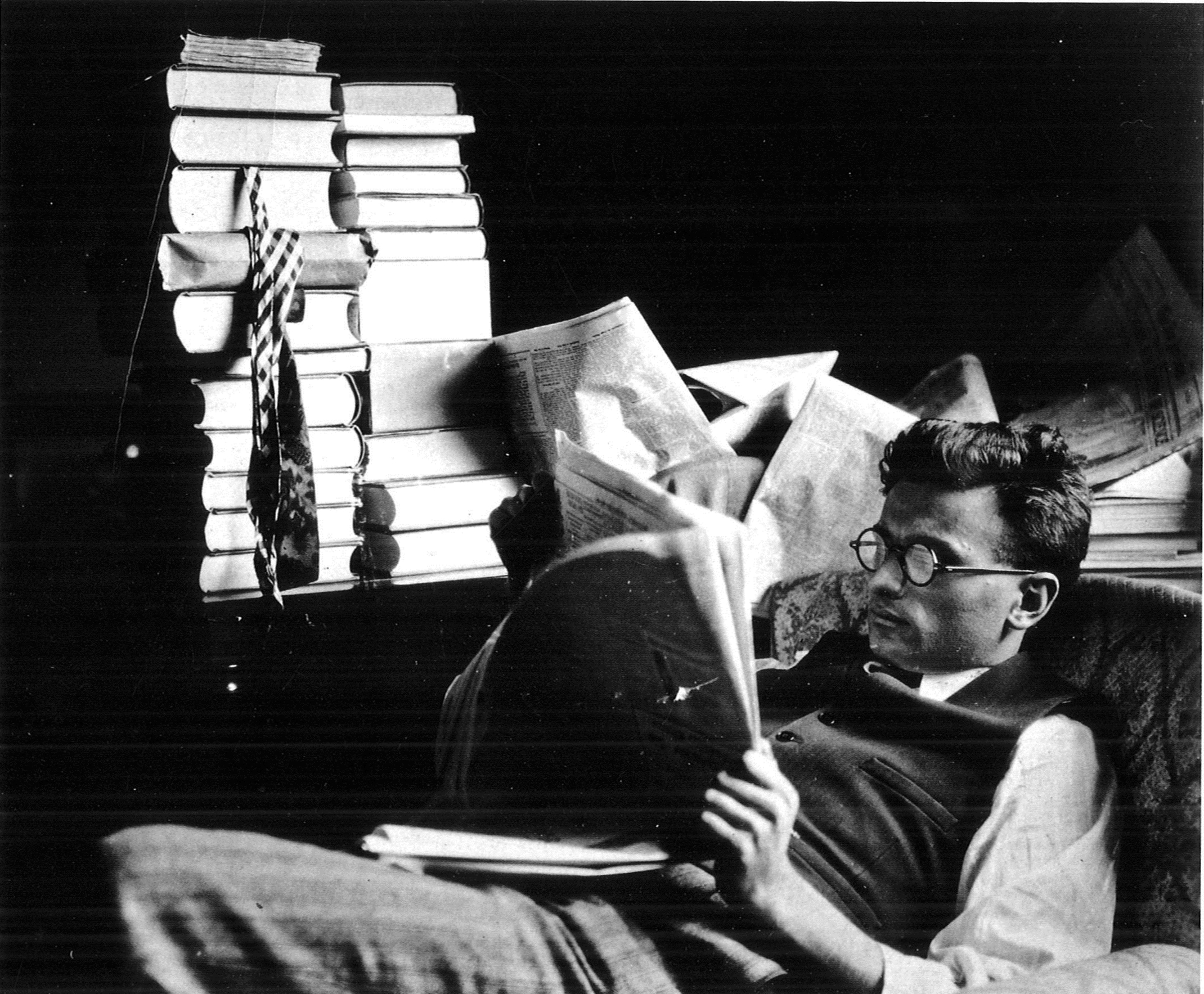
- Born: 1904
- Died: 1994 (aged 89–90); Piedmont, Italy
- Occupation: Academic
- Father: Luigi Einaudi
- Relatives: Giulio Einaudi (brother)

Mario Einaudi OMRI (1904–1994) was an Italian scholar of political theory and European comparative politics.

== Biography ==
He was born in 1904 in Italy in one of the most influential intellectual families in Italy. His father, Luigi Einaudi, was one of Italy's great economic thinkers and later became the second President of the Republic of Italy (1948–55). His brother, Giulio Einaudi, was antifascist and the founder of the leading intellectual publishing house Giulio Einaudi Editore. A graduate of the University of Turin's distinguished law faculty, Mario Einaudi married Manon Michels, the daughter of the sociologist Robert Michels, in 1933.

== Career ==
After graduation from Turin with a dissertation on Edmund Burke, Einaudi went to Berlin, where he met German jurists Friedrich Meinecke and Carl Schmitt. He then spent two years at the London School of Economics, working with William Beveridge, Harold Laski, Graham Wallas and A. D. Lindsay. While in London, he also met exiles from Fascism, Don Luigi Sturzo and Gaetano Salvemini, both of whom had formed political parties after World War I, only to be brushed aside by Mussolini.

From 1927 to 1929, Einaudi attended Harvard University as a Rockefeller fellow, conducting research on the United States Supreme Court. Later, he was fired from the faculty at the University of Messina for refusing to sign the Fascist oath; however, Harvard University gave him refuge, first as a tutor and then as an instructor.

In 1938, Einaudi was appointed as Assistant Professor at Fordham University where he was active in the struggle against fascism during World War II. He worked for the Office of War Information and the Council on Foreign Relations and began to teach future Allied Military Government personnel about European government once a week at Cornell University. It is said that he prepared his lectures on the now defunct Lehigh Valley railroad, during his commute between New York City and Ithaca, NY.

== Cornell University ==
Einaudi joined the Government Department of Cornell University in 1945 and immediately set about changing the course of comparative political theory. Eventually, Einaudi became the Goldwin Smith Professor, chair of the Department of Government from 1951 to 1956 and again from 1959 to 1963, presiding over an expansion of the Department from 5 to 12 members. Three central tenets to Einaudi's work were: that the study of politics must be embedded in history; that Europe and the United States have much to teach each other about the practice of democratic politics; and that the classics of political theory must inform the study of contemporary democratic states. These themes were best embodied in his 1959 book, The Roosevelt Revolution.

In 1960, Einaudi was asked to be the founding director of the Center for International Studies to initiate Cornell University's newfound commitment to engage in interdisciplinary research in international affairs. He envisioned international studies going beyond courses in area studies and foreign languages to include academic efforts to deal with economic, social, and development problems around the world. His foresight and leadership resulted in a design for the Center that insured its viability and growth into the future. Starting with a $3.25 million grant from the Ford Foundation in 1962, he raised more than $11 million to fund and endow international studies at Cornell during his leadership of the Center from 1960 to 1962 and 1966 to 1968.

In 1991, the Center for International Studies was renamed in honor of its founder as the Mario Einaudi Center for International Studies.

== Fondazione Luigi Einaudi ==
In 1964, he founded the Fondazione Luigi Einaudi in Turin, Italy in honor of his father. As Italian universities entered the turbulent 1960s, Einaudi recognized that European scholars were without necessary relief from teaching and administration needed to devote themselves to research. Hence, the Fondazione Luigi Einaudi was formed to transplant the American idea of the independent research institute to Italy. Today, it houses one of the world's most important economic history collections and gives postgraduate fellowships for students from around the world.

== Retirement ==
Although Einaudi retired in 1972, he remained active in Cornell's Center for International Studies, advising students, supporting its many activities, and inspiring the founding and expansion of the Institute for European Studies. With the help of the Italian Government, Einaudi also raised the funds for the Luigi Einaudi Chair in European and International Studies at Cornell. Since 1987, the Chair brings distinguished European scholars working in fields related to Luigi Einaudi's interest to the Cornell campus on a rotating basis.

In 1991, the Cornell's Center for International Studies was renamed the Mario Einaudi Center for International Studies. Cornell's Board of Trustees honored him for his long dedication to the University and as a "tireless proponent of clear and critical thinking, democracy, and ethics in politics; and a firm believer in the power of human values to transform the world."

Mario Einaudi died in 1994 in Piedmont, Italy.

== Selected works ==
- The Physiocratic Doctrine of Judicial Control, Harvard University Press, 1938
- Communism in Western Europe, Cornell University Press, 1951
- Christian Democracy in Italy and France(co-authored with François Goguel), University of Notre Dame Press, 1952
- Nationalization in France and Italy (co-authored with Maurice Byé and Ernesto Rossi), Cornell University Press, 1955
- The Roosevelt Revolution and the New American State, New York: Harcourt Brace, 1959
- The Early Rousseau, Cornell University Press, 1967
