= University of Turin Department of Law =

Law school in Italy

Coordinates: 45.068815°N 7.695102°E

University of Turin, Department of Law
- Type: Public
- Established: 1436
- Dean: Valeria Marcenò
- Academic staff: 196 professors
- Students: 7,300
- Location: Turin, Italy
- Website: www.dg.unito.it

The University of Turin Department of Law is the law school of the University of Turin. It is commonly shortened UNITO Department of Law. It traces its roots to the founding of the University of Turin, and has produced or hosted some of the most outstanding jurists, statespeople and scholars in Italian and European history. Among its distinguished faculty and alumni are leading writers, philosophers and legal scholars. Nowadays the Department of Law continues the tradition, with particular strengths in the fields of private law, EU law, comparative law and related fields, and a unique global role in delivering United Nations-linked graduate training.

== History of the Department ==
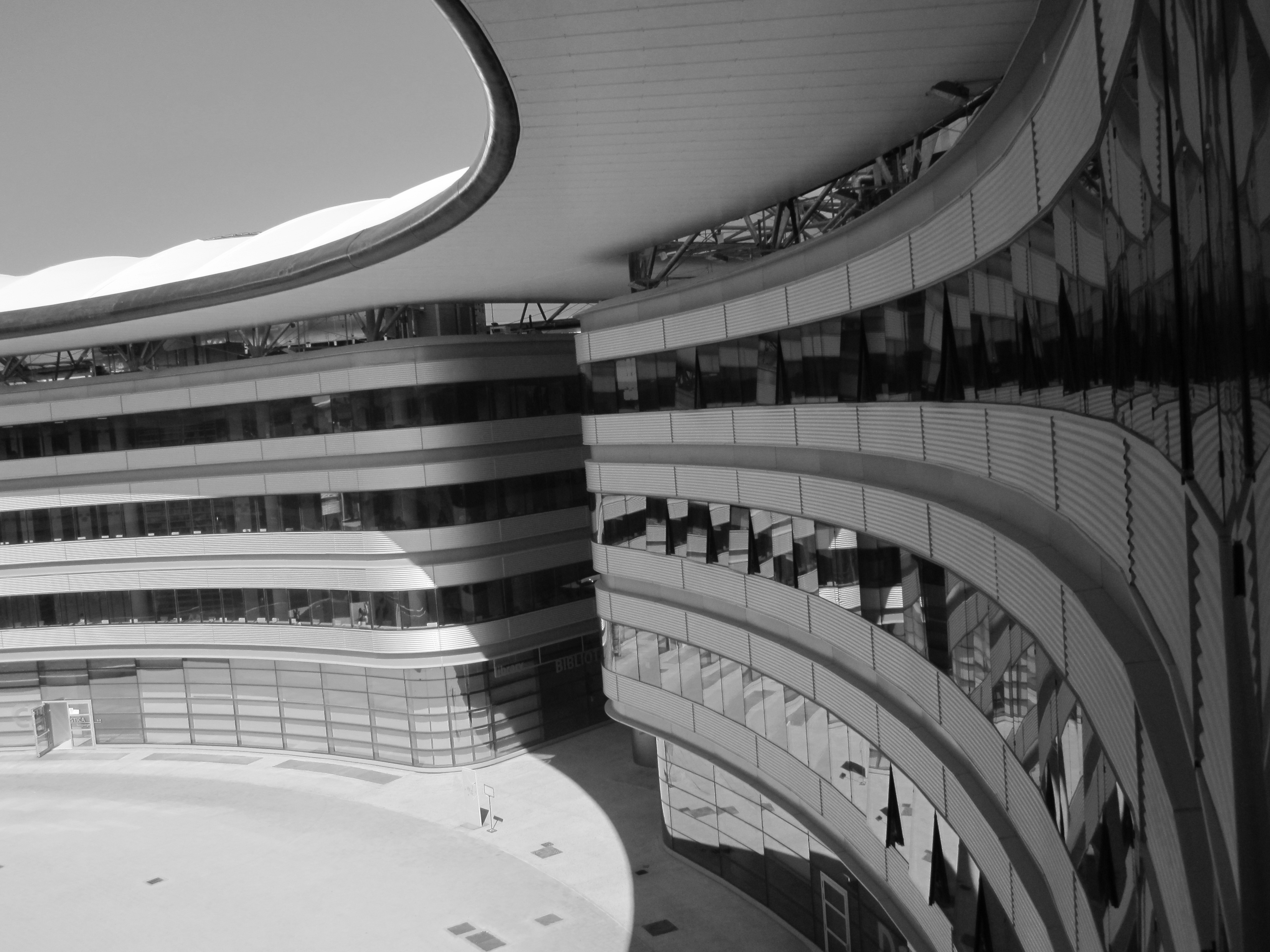
Luigi Einaudi Campus - Department of Law building

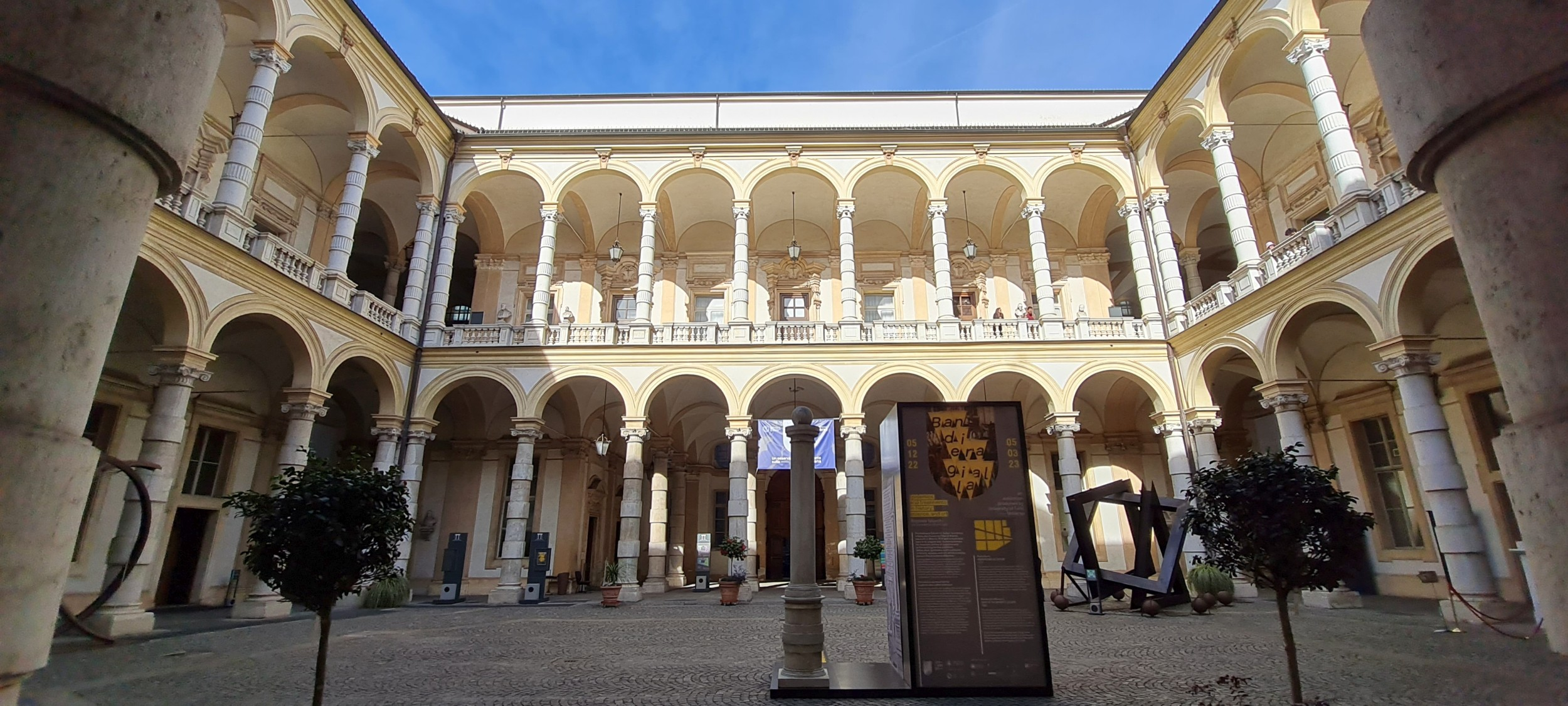
Central administrative building of the University of Turin

The history of the Department of Law can be traced to the establishment of the University of Turin, in 1404, and has followed its developments over the ensuing six centuries.

In autumn 1404, a bull issued by Benedict XIII, the Avignon Pope, marked the actual birth of a centre of higher learning in Torino, formally ratified in 1412 by the Emperor Sigmund's certification and subsequently, in 1413, by a bull issued by antipope John XXIII, the Pisan Pope, and probably by another issued in 1419 by Martin V, Pope of Rome, and by a series of papal privileges. The new institution, which initially only held courses in civil and canon law, was authorized to confer both the academic "licentia" and "doctoratus" titles which were later to become a single "laurea" (degree) title. It was the Bishop, as Rector of Studies, who proclaimed and conferred the title on the new doctors.

In 1436, ducal licenses established the three core faculties of Theology, Arts and Medicine, as well as Civil and Canon law. In the sixteenth and seventeenth centuries, the legal studies increasingly grew, giving the department a national and international reputation. Notable academics contributed to the growth of the department. During the years of the Resurgence, when a numerous group of patriots and intellectuals took refuge in the Savoy capital city, some of Italy's most remarkable names taught at the university and the Department of Law, like the jurist and statesman Pasquale Stanislao Mancini, and the two economics professors Antonio Scialoja and Francesco Ferrara.

In modern Italian history, the UNITO Department of Law was known for its central role in Italian national unification and cultural progressiveness. For instance, in 1881, the Department of Law graduated Lidia Poët, who would become the controversial first female jurist in modern Italy.

In the first half of 20th century some outstanding names in the history of the department and the university include: Luigi Einaudi, in the field of the financial studies; Gaetano Mosca in public law; Francesco Ruffini in canon law and Paolo Greco in commercial law. Most recently should be mentioned at least Norberto Bobbio, in legal philosophy; Giovanni Conso, in criminal law; Gastone Cottino in commercial law; Marcello Gallo, in criminal law; Giuseppe Grosso in Roman law; Rodolfo Sacco in civil and comparative law. The Department of Law is located in Turin, nearby the fascinating Mole Antonelliana. It is one of the leading law departments in Europe, with particular strengths in the fields of comparative law and private law. Additionally, the Department of Law has improved its physical facilities (including course offerings in Cuneo and international exchange programs with a number of the world's leading research universities). The Department of Law coordinates the research work of more than 120 law professors in the different areas of law.

== Academics and degree programs ==
The department offers a number of degrees, starting with the laurea di giurisprudenza (equivalent to an LL.B.), laurea specialistica or laurea magistrale (postgraduate law degree, equivalent to an LL.M.) and several specialized LL.M. programs. The department also offers some brief degree courses (three years). In addition, the department offers the dottorato di ricerca or the traditional research Ph.D. degree. As a result of the Bologna Process, all of the UNITO Law degrees are fully comparable and transferable across Europe, and graduates of the law department in fact practice in a number of leading jurisdictions across Europe.

== Master of Laws programs ==
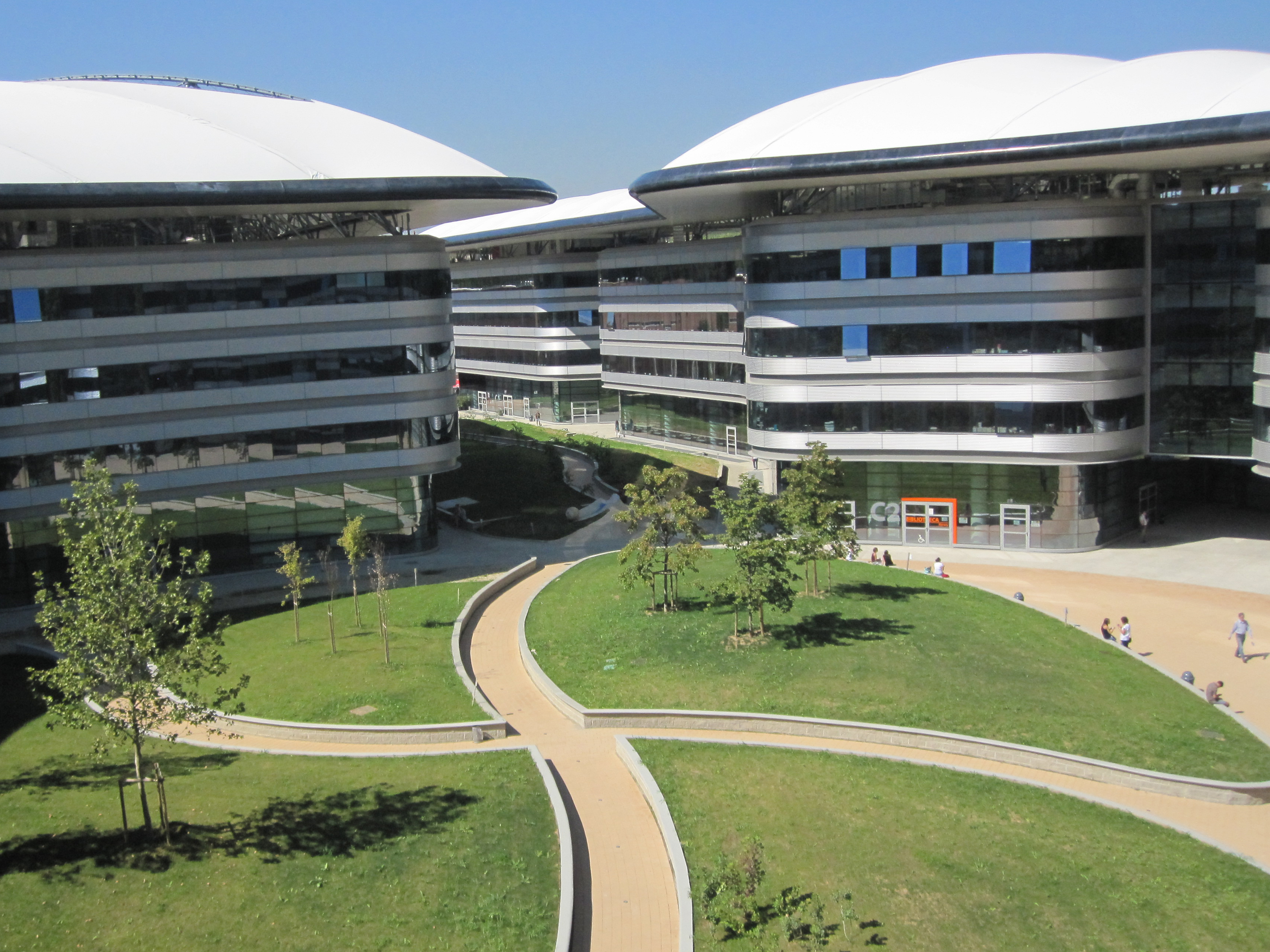
Luigi Einaudi Campus - buildings and gardens

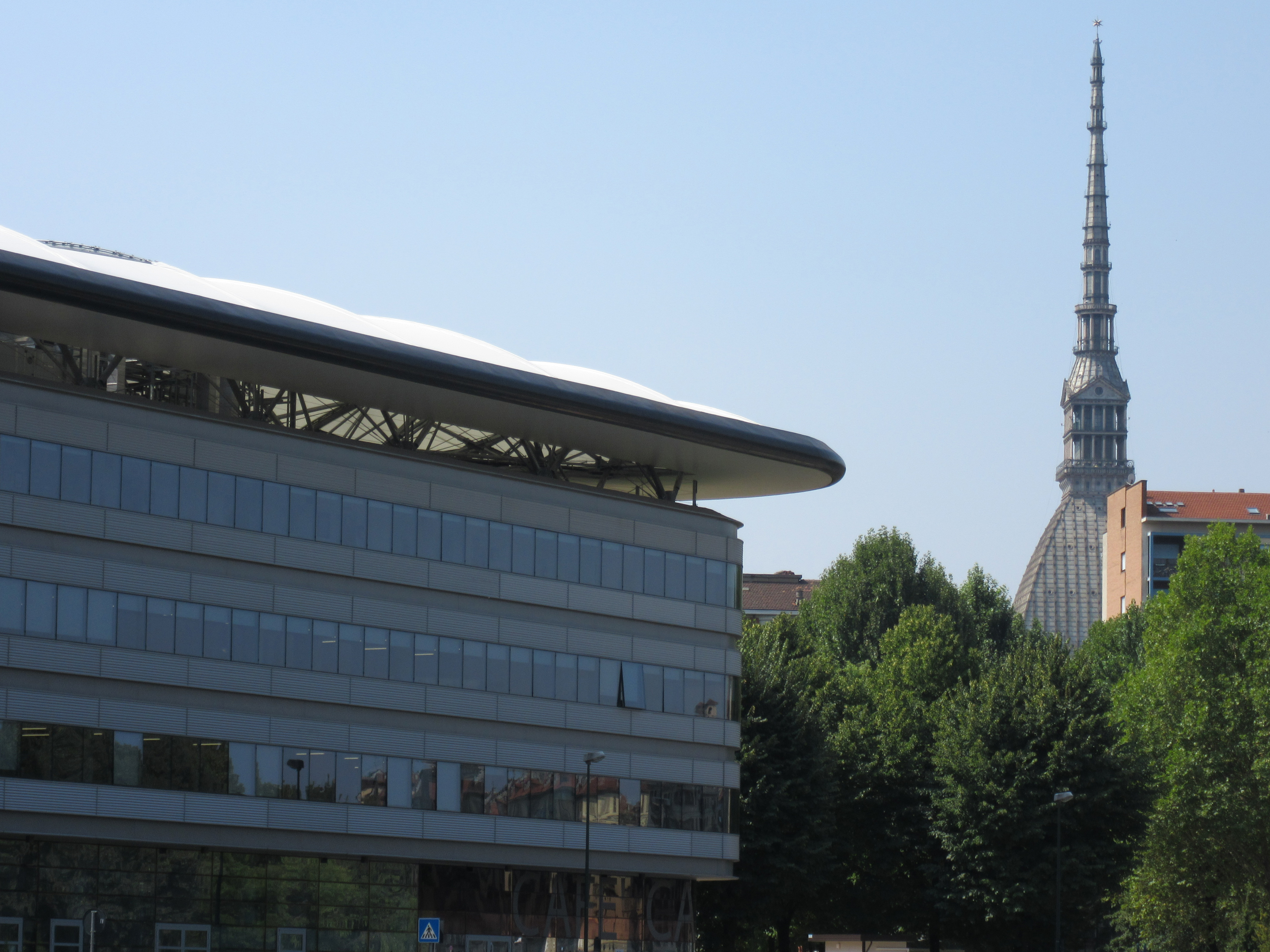
Luigi Einaudi Campus - Mole skyline

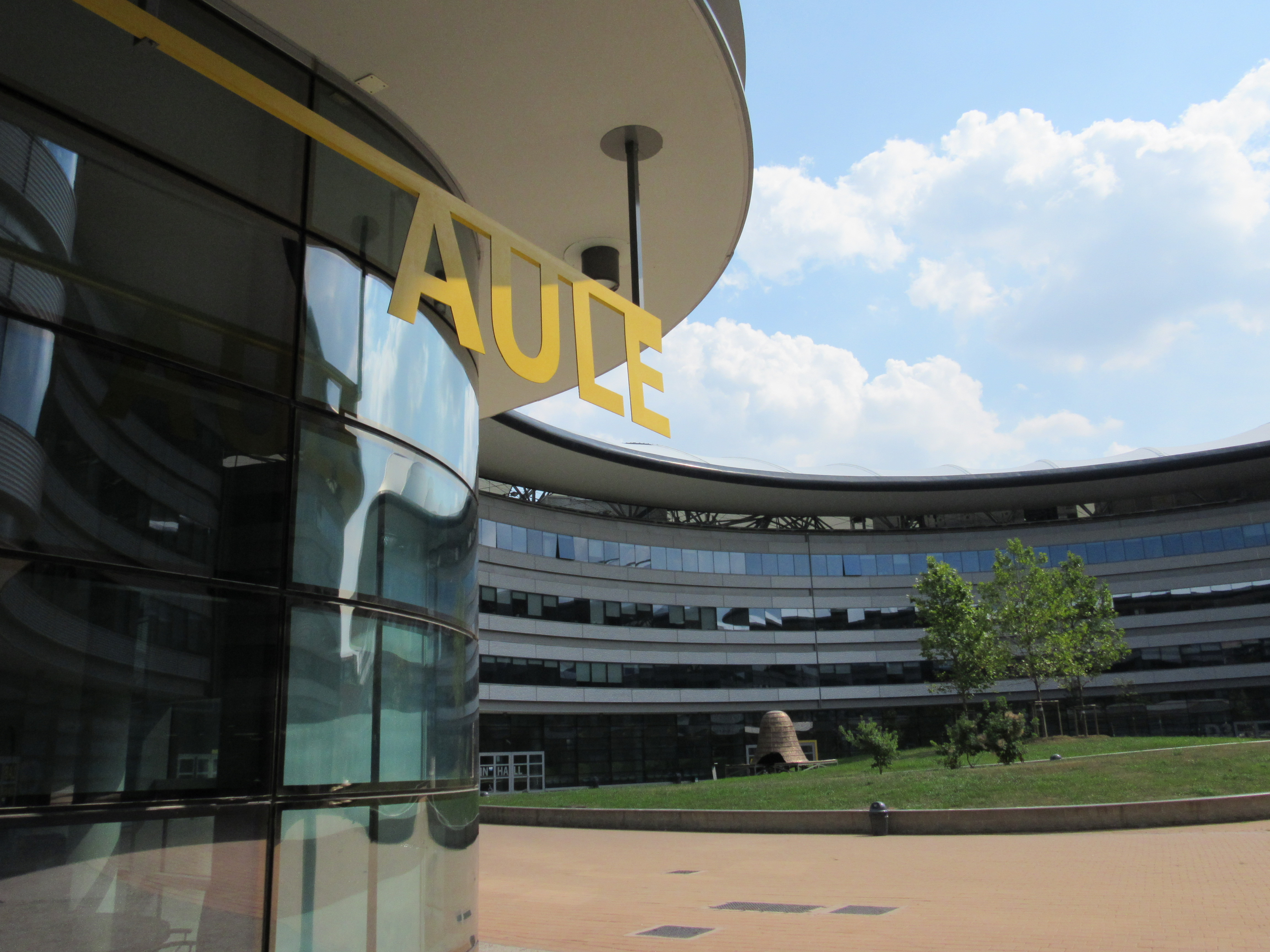
Luigi Einaudi Campus - classroom

Among the Department of Law's distinguishing features in delivering graduate training is its partnership with various specialized United Nations agencies, including the International Labour Organization and World Intellectual Property Organization. Its LL.M. program offerings, which are offered in English, Italian, and other languages, reflect this cooperation.

=== LL.M. in Agricultural & Food Markets Law ===
This Italian-language programme provides multidisciplinary training in the areas of agricultural law, food safety, production and marketing of food. It aims to train professionals for roles such as agro-food law specialist, food chain inspection expert, and consumer protection or trade association advocate. Official Website

=== M.Sc. in Comparative Law, Economics and Finance ===
This programme is delivered in English as a full-time, residential degree in conjunction with the International University College of Turin, a small graduate centre for the interdisciplinary and critical study of law, economics, finance and the commons.

=== Master in Industrial and Employment Relations ===
This English-language programme is co-organized with the International Training Centre of the International Labour Organization. It is delivered through a combination of online and in-person learning. Official Website

=== LL.M. in Intellectual Property ===
This English-language programme is co-organized with the World Intellectual Property Organization and the University of Turin's School of Management. It is the long-running of a series of joint master's degrees in intellectual property convened by the WIPO Academy with universities around the world including, also within the European Union, at Sofia University (Bulgaria), IE University (Spain), and Jagiellonian University (Poland). Official Website

=== LL.M. in International Trade Law ===
This English-language programme is co-organized with the International Training Centre of the International Labour Organization, United Nations Commission on International Trade Law, and UNIDROIT. It is delivered through a combination of online and in-person learning. Official Website

=== LL.M. in Public Administrative Law ===
This Italian-language programme includes courses on substantive and procedural administrative law, civil law, constitutional law, European Union law, tax law, criminal law and public accounting. Official Website

=== LL.M. in Public Procurement for Sustainable Development ===
This English-language programme is co-organized with the International Training Centre of the International Labour Organization and United Nations Commission on International Trade Law. It is delivered through a combination of online and in-person learning. Official Website

=== Master in Management of Development ===
This English-language programme is co-organized with the International Training Centre of the International Labour Organization and United Nations Conference on Trade and Development. It is delivered through a combination of online and in-person learning. Official Website

== Affiliated research institutes ==
The UNITO Department of Law is a founding member of a number of innovative international law programs, such as the Center for Transnational Legal Studies, London, and several independent research institutes:

- Center for Transnational Legal Studies
- Centre of Advanced Studies on Contemporary China
- Turin School of Development
- CLEI Centre

== See also ==
- List of UNITO law people
- Collegio Carlo Alberto
- Turin School of Development
