= Ugo Mattei =

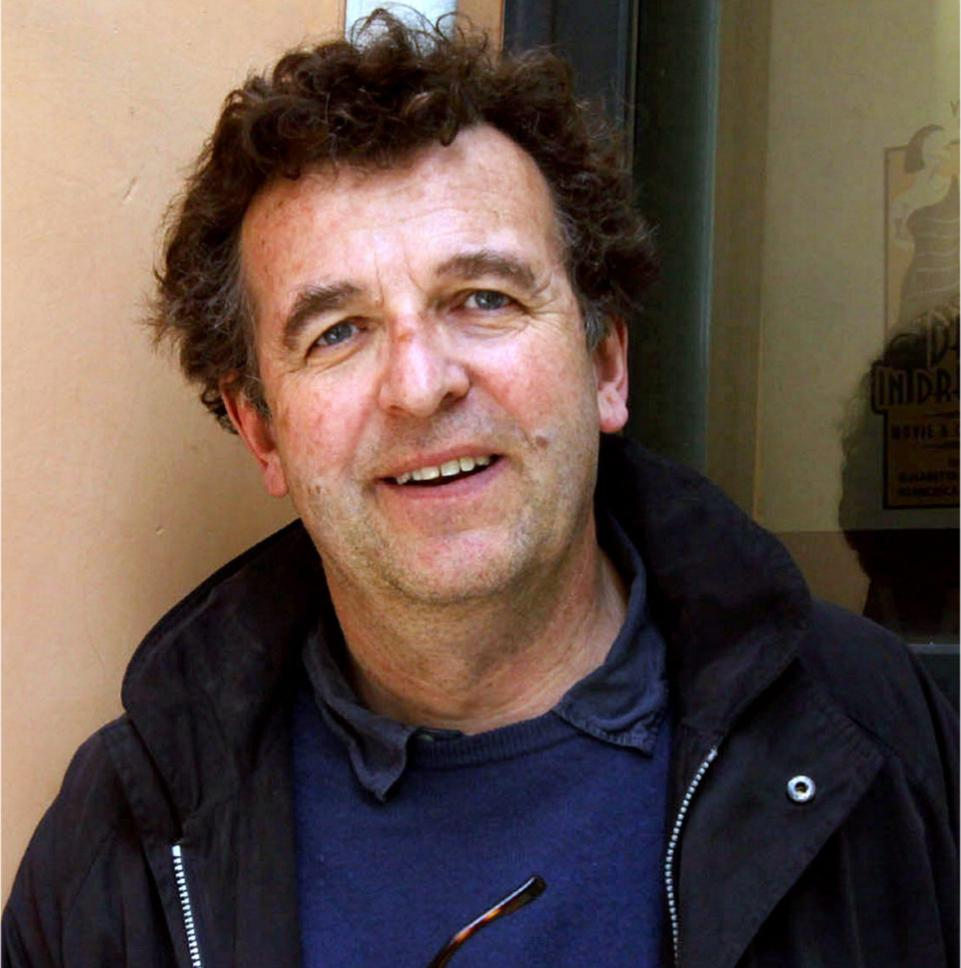
Ugo Mattei in 2015

Ugo Mattei (born 1961) is the Emeritus Alfred and Hanna Fromm Professor of International and Comparative Law at the University of California, Hastings College of the Law, in San Francisco, California, and a full professor of civil law in the University of Turin, Italy. He is the academic coordinator of the International University College of Turin, Italy, a school where issues of law and finance in global capitalism are critically approached. He is also a columnist for the Italian newspapers Il Manifesto and Il Fatto Quotidiano. For his ground-breaking studies on the commons, in 2017 Mattei won the Elinor Ostrom Award for the Collective Governance of the Commons.

== Early life and education ==
Born in Turin, Piedmont, Mattei graduated first in his class in 1983 from the Law School of the University of Turin and he received his LL.M. from Boalt Hall (University of California, Berkeley School of Law) in 1989 where he was a Fulbright Fellow. He also attended the London School of Economics and the Faculté Internationale de Droit Comparé in Strasbourg.

== Career ==
Mattei has been a visiting scholar at Yale Law School and the Trinity College and Wolfson College, University of Cambridge, and a visiting professor at Oslo, Berkeley, Montpellier, Macau. In 1985 he joined the law school of the University of Trento, where he received tenure as a full professor in 1990. In 1992 he was appointed as a professor in the Faculté Internationale de Droit Comparé (Strasbourg), where he served for four years.

In 1993, Mattei taught as a visiting professor on the U.C. Hastings faculty, where in 1994 he was appointed as the first holder of the Fromm Chair in International and Comparative Law, succeeding Rudolf Schlesinger in teaching comparative law. In 1997, he accepted a call from the University of Turin, Faculty of Law to succeed the famous Italian scholar Rodolfo Sacco in the Chair of Civil Law. He is a Full Member of the International Academy of Comparative Law, a member of the Executive Committee of the American Society of Comparative Law, a member of the Advisory Board of the Friburg Institute of Comparative Law, an advisor to the Institute of Law, Economics and Finances at Copenhagen Business School, a General Editor of the Series Common Core of European Private Law (Trento Project) at Cambridge University Press, a series editor of European Private Law in Context at Kluwer International and an editor in chief of Global Jurist. He is a member of the Editorial Board of the International Review of Law and Economics and of New Palgrave: A Dictionary of Economics and Law.

Mattei’s scholarship is broadly multi-disciplinary. Mattei has published many books and more than one hundred other publications in English, Italian, French, Portuguese, Russian, and Chinese. His book in English, written with anthropologist Laura Nader, Plunder: When the Rule of Law is Illegal. has been translated in five languages.

Ugo Mattei has recently oriented the focus of his research on the study and practice of the commons after successfully masterminding a nationwide referendum against privatization of water in 2011. His Italian bestseller "Beni Comuni.Un Manifesto" has generated much attention throughout European social movements. Mattei experimented some of the ideas developed in that book in Naples as the President of the local water company from 2012 to 2014 and in Chieri (Turin) as a Deputy Major in 2014 and 2015. In 2015 together with ecologist and scientist Fritjof Capra he has published "The Ecology of Law. Toward a Legal System in Tune with Nature and Community" that won IBPA Benjamin Franklin Award forPolitics/Current Events in 2016 and has since been translated to various languages. In 2018 with Alessandra Quarta he co-authored "The Turning Point in Private Law: Ecology, Technology and the Commons".

In 2018 Mattei has founded "Comitato Popolare Difesa beni pubblici e comuni Stefano Rodotà" (The Rodotà committee), now transformed into the Generazioni Future Cooperative, which aims at creating the legal mechanisms to oppose the commodification of commons. In 2023, "Generazioni Future", with Mattei as its president, promoted "two national referendums" in Italy against sending weapons systems to the Ukrainian war theatre and against the privatisation of the Italian health service.

On 25 April 2019, Ugo Mattei received Honoris Causa Doctorate by Faculty of Law and Criminology of Catholic University of Louvain.

== Books ==
- Mattei, Ugo (2003). The European Codification Process: Cut and Paste. Kluwer Law International. ISBN 90-411-2230-3.
- Mattei, Ugo; Nader, Laura (2008). Plunder: When the Rule of Law is Illegal. Wiley-Blackwell. ISBN 978-1-4051-7894-5.
- Mattei, Ugo; Ruskola, Teemu (2009). Schlesinger's Comparative Law. London: Foundation. ISBN 978-1-58778-591-7.
- Mattei, Ugo; Capra, Fritjof (2017). Ecologia del diritto. Torino: Aboca. ISBN 978-88-98881-41-3.
- Mattei, Ugo; Quarta, Alessandra (2018). Punto di svolta. Ecologia, tecnologia e diritto privato. Dal capitale ai beni comuni. Torino: Aboca. ISBN 978-88-98881-65-9.
