= Capricorn Concerto =

Composition by Samuel Barber

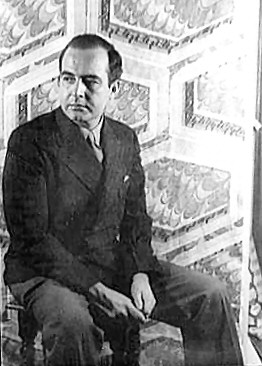
Samuel Barber in 1944

Capricorn Concerto, Op. 21, is a composition for flute, oboe, trumpet, and strings by Samuel Barber, completed on September 8, 1944. A typical performance lasts approximately 14 minutes.

== History ==
The concerto was written when Barber was still serving in the U.S. Army, but was granted time and freedom to compose. Hence, the piece was composed in and named after the house "Capricorn" in Mount Kisco, acquired by Barber and Gian Carlo Menotti in 1943 and so-named for the maximum sunshine it got during the winter. It is therefore "a nostalgic piece that expresses Barber’s desire to return to a situation where he could compose without the constant interruption of military requirements", and was the last piece Barber wrote before his discharge from military duty.

The work was composed for Daniel Saidenberg but it is not certain whether or not it was also under the aegis of the Office of War Information—the Army unit to which Barber was assigned. It was premiered by the Saidenberg Little Symphony—the resident orchestra at the 92nd Street Y from 1948 to 1957 —at The Town Hall on October 8, 1944.

== Structure ==
The Capricorn Concerto is designed like a Baroque concerto grosso and is scored for three of the solo instruments used in Bach's Brandenburg Concerto No. 2—flute, oboe and trumpet—and an orchestra of strings. (Bach's Brandenburg Concerto No. 2 has a fourth solo part, for violin.) The piece is a departure from Barber's previous language, being neither atonal nor polytonal, but written in a contemporary tonal style. Rhythmically nervous with frequent shifts of tempi, it may be characterized as neo-classical and was strongly influenced by Stravinsky.

The work has three movements:

1. Allegro ma non troppo
2. Allegretto
3. Allegro con brio

The first movement is built in two main sections, preceded by a sixteen-bar introduction and concluding with a twelve-bar coda. Four motives presented in the introduction serve as thematic material throughout the movement.

== Discography ==
- Samuel Barber: Capricorn Concerto. Julius Baker (flute); Mitch Miller (oboe); Harry Freistadt (trumpet); Saidenberg Little Symphony; Daniel Saidenberg, cond. (With William Schuman: Symphony No. 5. Concert Hall String Symphony; Edgar Schenkman, cond.) LP recording, mono, 12 in. Gold Label Series. Concert Hall CHS-1078. New York: Concert Hall, [1950s]. Capricorn Concerto reissued on CD Samuel Barber: Premiere Recordings (Also with The School for Scandal Overture, Op. 5; Sonata for Cello and Piano, Op. 6; Symphony no 1, Op. 9; Essay for Orchestra no 1, Op. 12; Dover Beach, Op. 3; Adagio for Strings). Pearl CD 49.
- Samuel Barber: Capricorn Concerto, Essay No. 1 for Orchestra. Louise DiTullio (flute); Allan Vogel (oboe); Anthony Plog (trumpet,); Pacific Symphony Orchestra; Keith Clark, cond. Pacific Symphony American Music Series. LP recording. Andante AD 72406. North Hollywood, Calif.: Andante, 1983.
- Barber: Violin Concerto, Cello Concerto, Capricorn Concerto. Jacob Berg (flute); Peter Bowman (oboe); Susan Slaughter (trumpet); St. Louis Symphony Orchestra; Leonard Slatkin, cond. CD recording. RCA Victor Red Seal 68283.
- Barber: Capricorn Concerto, Adagio for Strings, Serenade for Strings. (With works by Arthur Foote, Aaron Copland, and Charles Ives.) János Bálint (flute), Reinhold Friedrich (trumpet), Lajos Lencsés (oboe); Budapest Strings; Károly Botvay, cond. CD recording. Capriccio Records 0505.
- Music For The Theatre Vol 2. Samuel Barber: Capricorn Concerto for Flute, Oboe, Trumpet and Strings, op. 21. Omar Zoboli (oboe), Isabelle Schnöller (flute), Reinhold Friedrich (trumpet); Kammerorchester Basel; Christopher Hogwood, cond. (With music by Aaron Copland.) CD recording. Arte Nova 506930. [n.p.]: Arte Nova, 2006.
- Howard Hanson Conducts Barber, Piston, Griffes, Et Al. Samuel Barber Capricorn Concerto. Walter Piston The Incredible Flutist; Charles Tomlinson Griffes Poem for Flute and Orchestra; plus works by William McCauley, Kent Kennan, and William Bergsma. Robert Sprenkle (oboe), Sidney Mear (trumpet), Joseph Mariano (flute); Mercury Living Presence #:434307.
- Naxos recordings
