= Gustavo Rol =

Italian parapsychologist (1903–1994)

Rol in 1972

Gustavo Adolfo Rol (20 June 1903 – 22 September 1994) was an Italian parapsychologist and painter. His devotees consider him to have been a great spiritual master and have testified to miraculous feats he supposedly accomplished.

== Biography ==
Rol was born in Turin, Italy, and graduated in law at the University of Turin, Faculty of Law, in 1933. He also studied in London and Paris and began a banking career that took him to other major European cities. He was also an amateur painter and his work was featured in exhibitions at the Pinacoteca Giovanni e Marella Agnelli and the Guido Costa Projects. While in Marseille during 1925-1926, he encountered a person who showed him some card tricks, triggering an interest in magical and paranormal phenomena. He pursued deeper spiritual studies and had an experience in Paris of which he wrote in his diary: "I discovered a tremendous law that links the color green, the musical fifth, and heat. I have lost my will to live. I am frightened by power. I shall write no more!" As a result of this crisis, he briefly retreated to a convent.

Upon returning to Italy, Rol became known in aristocratic and political circles in the 1930s. He engaged in various demonstrations of his supposed mystical powers, including telepathy, clairvoyance, and other psychic or magical feats. He also became a friend, among others, of film directors Federico Fellini and Franco Zeffirelli and writer Dino Buzzati. Toward the later part of his life, and after his death, Rol was a focal point of debate in Italy between skeptics and advocates of parapsychology. His alleged mystical powers were never demonstrated, and he repeatedly refused to be cross-examined by other illusionists.
