= Gunther Teubner =

German legal scholar and sociologist (born 1944)

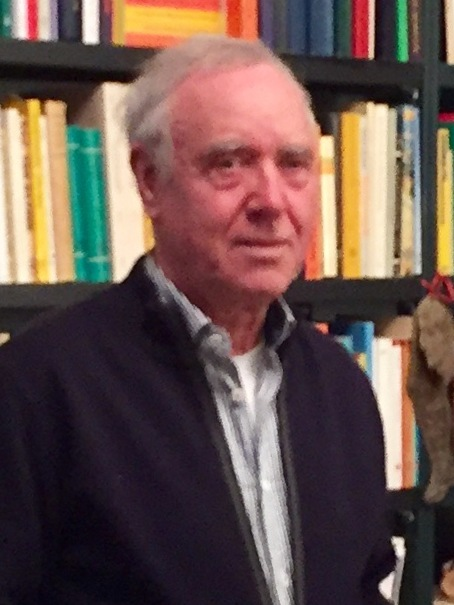
Gunther Teubner (2017)

Gunther Teubner (born 30 April 1944 in Herrnhut) is a German legal scholar and sociologist, best known for his works within the field of Social Theory of Law. His work "stands as one of the most highly evolved positions in the contemporary sociology of law and legal-political norms".

== Biography ==
He was Professor of Private Law at the University of Bremen from 1977 to 1981. From 1982 to 1991 he was associated with the European University Institute in Florence, Italy. From 1993 to 1998 he was the Otto Kahn Freund Professor of Comparative Law and Legal Theory at the London School of Economics, and since 1998 he has been Professor of Private Law and Legal Sociology at the University of Frankfurt. Since 2007, Teubner has been Principal Investigator at the Frankfurt Excellence Cluster "The Formation of Normative Orders". In 2007/2008 he was Fellow at Wissenschaftskolleg Berlin, in 2009/2010 at the universities of The Hague, and Maastricht. In 2011 he has taken up an "ad personam" Jean Monnet Chair at the International University College of Turin.
