= Turin School of Development =

- Type: Public
- Established: 2009
- Students: 150-170 per term
- Location: Turin, Italy
- Campus: Turin
- Website: Turin School of Development

The Turin School of Development (TSD) was founded in Turin in October 2009 as a joint venture between the International Training Center of the ILO, the Italian Ministry of Foreign Affairs, the University of Turin and related UN agencies. The first class of postgraduate students matriculated in the 2009-2010 academic year.

== Background ==
The International Training Centre of the ILO, launched in October 1990, the postgraduate course on International Trade Law, in collaboration with the University Institute for European Studies (IUSE) and with the support of distinguished faculty from the University of Turin and other major European universities. The Program was presented at a special ceremony at the Palais des Nations in Geneva.

New multi-disciplinary programs were developed after the success of this first course, through the same approach, in collaboration with major international organizations like WIPO, UNESCO and UNCITRAL: in 2000 the Master in Management of Development and the Master of Law (LL.M) in Intellectual Property; in 2003 the Master in World Heritage and Cultural Projects for Development; in 2006 the Master in Public Procurement Management for Sustainable Development and the Master in Occupational Safety and Health. At last, in 2010 the Master In Applied Labour Economics for Development was funded.

=== TSD Strength ===
The intensive delivery through the optimal combination of distance learning with face-to-face learning meets the learning requirements of a European master's degree. This particular combination allows also workers to participate to the programs because the time involved for the face to face part is only 4 months. Moreover, some programs offer the possibility of an internship with one of our institutional UN or professional partners.”

== Masters ==
The TSD offers 7 master programs through a unique learning path.

=== Faculty ===
The faculty of the Turin School of Development is a mix of university professors, combined with leading practitioners from the UN system and key professional bodies.

Lectures frequently includes prominent international professors such as Prof. David Throsby, Prof. Allen Scott, Prof. Massimo Marelli (rector of University of Naples), Prof. Gianmaria Ajani (dean of the Law Faculty of the University of Turin) and Prof Helmut Anheier.

In addition the participants’ learning is closely supported by dedicated tutors.

TSD has also an international student body, drawing its students from more than 65 countries worldwide. Overall, 1,900 participants have graduated and are currently occupying important jobs in their countries or internationally.

== Campus ==
The Face to Face modules of the masters are held at the International Training Centre Campus in Turin, Italy.

== See also ==
- ILO
- University of Turin
- Turin, Italy
- Politecnico di Torino
- UNESCO
- UNCITRAL
- WORLD BANK
