= Karen F. Parker =

American sociologist and criminologist

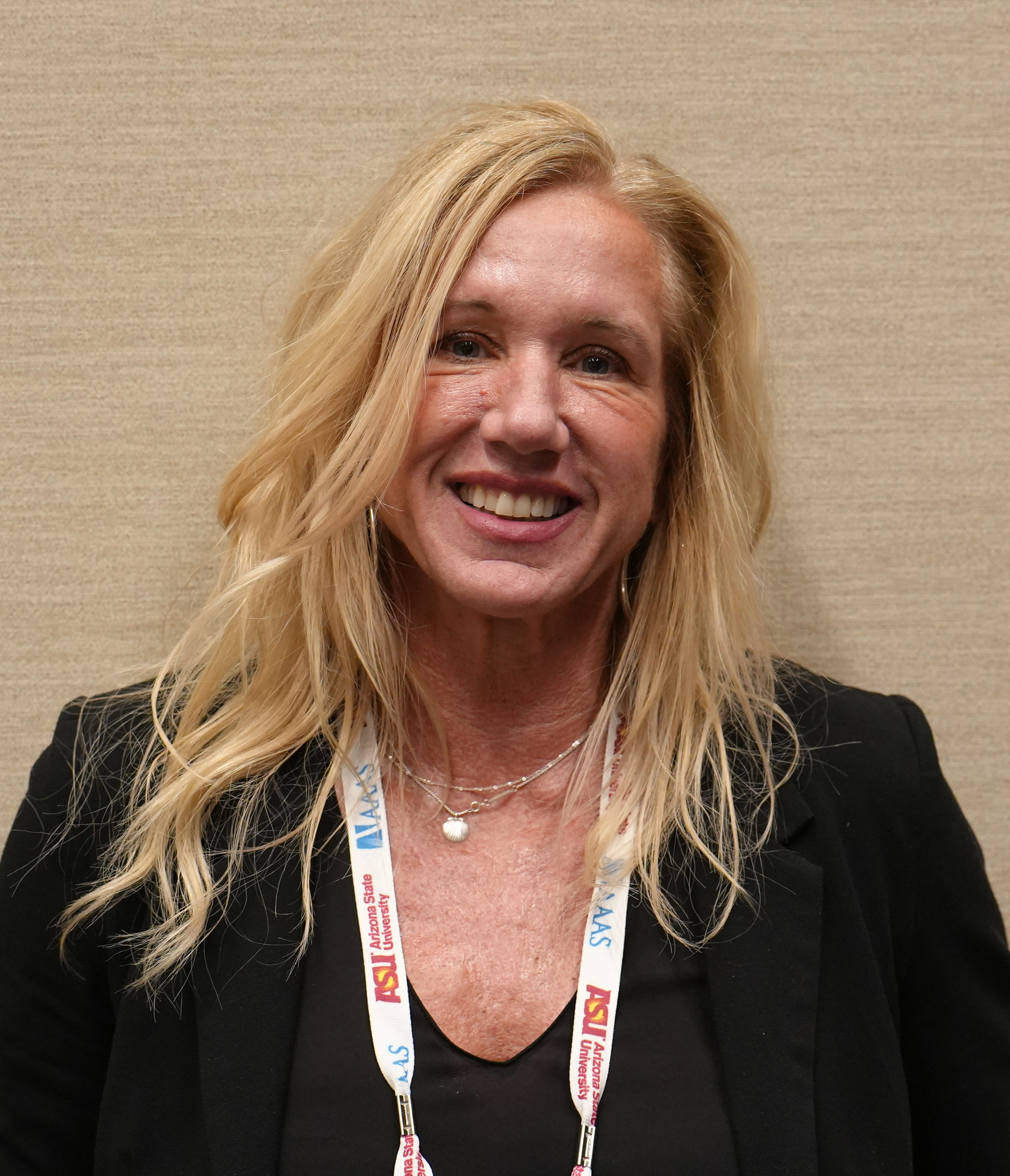
- Education: University of North Carolina-Wilmington, North Carolina State University
- Awards: 2008 Coramae Richey Mann Award from the Division on People of Color and Crime of the American Society of Criminology
- Scientific career
- Fields: Sociology, criminology
- Institutions: University of Delaware, University of Florida
- Thesis: The effects of structural conditions on racially disaggregated homicide rates (1996)
- Doctoral advisor: Patricia McCall
- Website: sites.google.com/site/karenfparkerprof/home

Karen Faye Parker is an American sociologist and criminologist known for her research on urban violence. She is a professor of sociology and criminology at the University of Delaware, where she has worked since 2007. She has also been a research associate at the University of Michigan's National Poverty Center since 2007, and was formerly a professor at the University of Florida before joining the faculty of the University of Delaware.
