= Karen Parker (lawyer) =

American lawyer

- Born: August 12, 1949 (age 76)
- Education: University of San Francisco School of Law (JD)
- Occupation: Attorney
- Parent(s): Sidney Mear; Elizabeth Irvine Fetter

Karen Parker (born August 12, 1949) is an attorney based in San Francisco specializing in human rights and humanitarian law. Since the early 1980s, she has contributed to the evolution of international legal norms in the fields of economic sanctions, use of weaponry, environment as a human right, sexual slavery, and the rights of disabled persons. She regularly testifies at the United Nations Human Rights Council, formerly the United Nations Commission on Human Rights, and has served as an expert witness in disputes concerning armed conflict law, including conflicts in Central America, Iraq and Afghanistan. She has also worked as a mediator on behalf of several resistance movements active in the world today, especially Sri Lanka, Burma (Myanmar), Kashmir, Maluku, and Iran.

== Education and affiliations ==
Parker is the daughter of noted trumpeter Sidney Mear and a native of Rochester, New York. She obtained her J.D. degree in 1983 from the University of San Francisco School of Law, interning at the Inter-American Commission on Human Rights of the Organization of American States (OAS), and externing for Justice Frank C. Newman of the Supreme Court of California. She received a diploma in Droit international et droit comparé des droits de l'homme (International and Comparative Law of Human Rights) from the International Institute of Human Rights in Strasbourg, France in 1982. That same year, she founded the Association of Humanitarian Lawyers and continues to serve as its president. She is the chief delegate of International Educational Development - Humanitarian Law Project, a nongovernmental organization accredited by the United Nations Economic and Social Council. Through the years, she has represented or served as a consulting attorney for Disabled Peoples' International, Human Rights Advocates, and the Sierra Club Legal Defense Fund. She is currently a member of the Committee of 100 for Tibet.

== Notable activities ==
In 1985, Parker intervened on behalf of Salvadoran rebel commander Nidia Diaz, captured after being shot by government forces during the civil war in that country. Diaz' imprisonment and subsequently arranged surgery were widely publicized when actor Mike Farrell of M*A*S*H* fame assisted a neurosurgeon during the operation. Throughout the war, Ms. Parker participated in investigative delegations and testified in numerous forums about humanitarian law violations, as well as the principle of non-refoulement.

In 1991, Parker petitioned the newly created U.N. Working Group on Detention on behalf of the relatives of Aung San Suu Kyi, an opposition leader in Burma who won the Nobel Peace Prize later that year. The U.N. group ruled that Suu Kyi's detention by military authorities was arbitrary and that the activist should be released. She was in 1993, but detained again in 1996.

In the mid-1990s, Parker's legal arguments on the subject of war rape were incorporated into a landmark civil action filed in Japan on behalf of the comfort women. While the plaintiffs' case did not prevail, the Japanese government set up the Asian Women's Fund in 1994 to distribute small payments to victims in South Korea, the Philippines, Taiwan, the Netherlands, and Indonesia.

In 1997, concerning the use of depleted uranium munitions by the United States during the first Gulf War, Parker delivered a statement at the U.N. Commission on Human Rights regarding the legality of this type of weaponry. She later participated in an international advocacy campaign to outlaw the use of this material, including a lawsuit filed at the Inter-American Commission on Human Rights.

In 2000, she assisted the U.N. Special Rapporteur on Sanctions in developing a six-prong test to determine if a trade embargo and other economic sanctions violate human rights and humanitarian law.

In 2007, Parker worked as a consulting attorney in the civil case of Xiaoning v. Yahoo! Inc. Filed in the U.S. District Court in Northern California, the lawsuit resulted in a settlement, with an undisclosed sum paid to the plaintiffs.

== Publications ==
- "Geneva Convention Protections for Salvadoran Refugees", Immigration Newsletter Vol. 13 #3, National Lawyers Guild (May 1984).
- "Human Rights and Humanitarian Law", 7 Whittier L. Rev. 675 (1985).
- "Jus Cogens: Compelling the Law of Human Rights", 12 HASTINGS INT’L & COMP. L. REV. 12 #2, 411-463 (Winter 1989),
- Fumigation programs in Guatemala: preliminary report, Association of Humanitarian Lawyers, 1989
- "Compensation for Japan’s World War II War-Rape Victims", with Jennifer F. Chew, HASTINGS INT’L COMP. L. REW. 17 #3, 497-549. (Spring 1994).
- "Beyond the blame game: finding common grounds for peace & justice in Kashmir," with Ghulam Nabi Fai, Kashmiri American Council (2004), ISBN 0-9646849-0-X
- "War Crimes Committed by the United States in Iraq and Mechanisms for Accountability", Consumers for Peace, (10/10/2006)
