= Mauro Bussani =

Italian professor (born 1959)

Mauro Bussani (born December 14, 1959, in Trieste, Italy, to Jolanda Evangelisti, a seamstress, and Nereo, an Italian Red Cross employee and unionist) is Professor of Comparative Law at the University of Trieste Law School, Italy, and adjunct professor at the Faculty of Law at the University of Macao, Special Autonomous Region of the People’s Republic of China. In 2019 he was awarded a Ph.D. honoris causa by the Faculty of Law at the University of Fribourg, in Switzerland. Mauro Bussani is considered an outstanding expert of comparative law, and his work has been broadly recognized worldwide. His research focuses, among other themes, on the comparative law of contracts, torts, and security interests, on European private law and legal harmonization, on law and development, human rights and the law of globalization(s).

== Legal career ==
Mauro Bussani received his J.D. from the University of Trieste Law School (summa cum laude). He lectured in the same University from 1982 to 1986, and was granted a tenured position as assistant professor at the University of Trento Law School in 1986. He became associate professor in 1998, Full Professor in 1999, and joined the Faculty of the University of Trieste Law School in 2000. During his career, Mauro Bussani has delivered lectures in some of the most prominent academic institutions and universities in the world, and joined many high-ranking universities as Visiting professor. He is a member of the scientific councils of many internationally renowned law journals, and is a member of many learned societies and research institutes around the globe.

== Scholarship ==
Bussani’s scholarship has had a global reach and impact. His work on the notion and meaning of fault has proved extremely influential in continental Europe and Latin America, while his researchers (conducted with Vernon Valentine Palmer, Tulane U., La.) on the compensation for pure economic loss(es) have revolutionized the subject – and one of them has been translated in Chinese by Law China Press. Equally ground-breaking has been his contribution to the comparative law of security interests and to the comparative law of contract, as it is demonstrated by the fact that Bussani was invited twice to participate in European-wide projects financed by the European Commission for the harmonization of contract law. With Ugo Mattei (UC Hastings, Ca., and Turin U., Italy), Bussani developed an innovative comparative law methodology, mixing Rudolf B. Schlesinger’s and Rodolfo Sacco’s revolutionary findings on comparative legal studies. This new methodology is embodied in ‘The Common Core of European Private Law Project’, a project which aims to unearth, through an approach based on factual questionnaires, what is common and what is divergent between European private laws. A network of more than three hundreds European and non-European scholars participates in the project, and the latter’s results are collected in volumes published by Cambridge University Press in a peer-reviewed series named after the title of the project itself, under the direction of Bussani and Mattei. In recent years, Bussani successfully turned his mastery of comparative law methods on more public-attuned themes, starting pioneering investigations on international financial law, the comparative law of human rights, and legal globalization(s).

== Major publications ==
Mauro Bussani has published more than twenty books and authored or co-authored more than one-hundred forty publications in Italian, English, and French, some of which were translated in Portuguese, Spanish, Serbian, Turkish, Chinese, Japanese, and Korean. Many of his essays are freely accessible at his author’s pages on the Social Science Research Network and Bepress Legal Repository websites. The following is a selection of Prof. Bussani's books.

- Responsabilidad Civil y Garantías Reales. Estudios de Derecho Comparado (with M. Infantino), Ediciones Olejnik, 2016
- Comparisons in Legal Development. The Impact of Foreign and International Law on National Legal Systems (ed., with L. Heckendorn Urscheler), Schulthess, 2016
- Comparative Tort Law. Global Perspectives (ed., with A.J. Sebok), Edward Elgar, 2015
- European Private Law. A Handbook (ed., with F. Werro), Staempfli-Bruylant-Carolina Ac. Press-Ant. N. Sakkoulas-Sellier, 2009, vol I, and 2014, vol II
- Il diritto italiano in Europa (1861-2014) (cur.), Annuario di diritto comparato e di studi legislativi, vol. V, E.S.I., 2014
- Cambridge Companion to Comparative Law (ed., with U. Mattei), CUP, 2012
- Il diritto dell'Occidente. Geopolitica delle regole globali, Einaudi, 2010
- Pure Economic Loss: New Horizons in Comparative Law (ed., with V.V. Palmer), Routledge-Cavendish, 2008
- European Tort Law. Eastern and Western Perspectives (ed.), Staempfli, 2007
- Pure Economic Loss in Europe (ed., with V.V. Palmer), CUP, 2003 – Chinese version by Law Press China, 2005
- As peculiaridades da noção de culpa: um estudo de direito comparado, Livraria do Advogado, 2000
- Diritto, giustizia ed interpretazione (ed., with J. Derrida and G. Vattimo), Laterza, 1998
- Proprietà-garanzia e contratto. Formule e regole nel leasing finanziario, Quaderni del Dipartimento di Scienze Giuridiche, 1995
- La colpa soggettiva. Modelli di valutazione della condotta nella responsabilità extracontrattuale, Cedam, 1991
- I contratti nuovi. Leasing, Factoring, Franchising (with P. Cendon), Giuffrè, 1989
