= International Training Centre of the International Labour Organization =

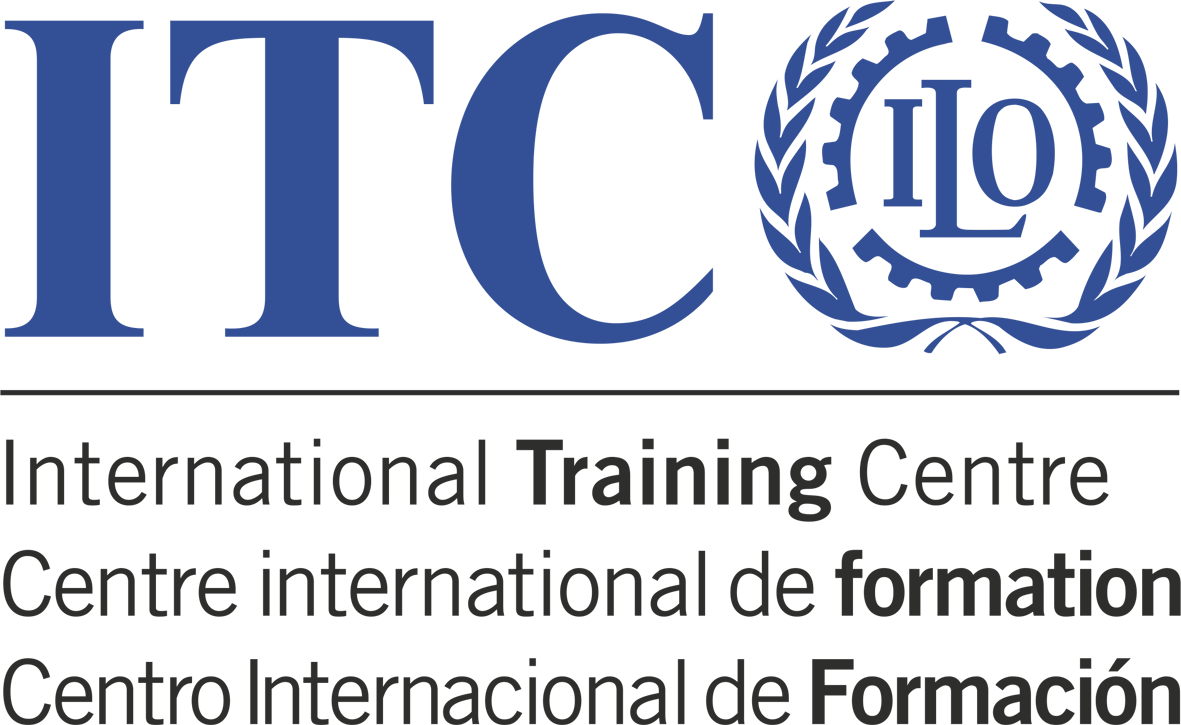
- Abbreviation: ITCILO
- Formation: 1964
- Type: International body belonging to the UN system
- Legal status: Active
- Headquarters: Turin, Italy
- Director: Mr. Cristophe Perrin
- Website: www.itcilo.org

The International Training Centre of the International Labour Organization (ITCILO) is the training arm of the International Labour Organization (ILO). It runs training, learning and capacity development services for governments, employers' organizations, workers' organizations and other national and international partners in support of Decent Work and sustainable development. It is part of the United Nations System.

== Board ==
Given its tripartite structure, the centre is governed by a board composed of representatives of governments, workers' and employers' organizations. The board approves the annual programme and budget, provides strategic guidance and direction to the management of the centre, proposes adjustments to reflect changing priorities and resources and, through the review of internal and external audit reports, exercises an oversight role in relation to financial and internal governance matters. The board meets annually and is chaired by the director-general of the ILO.

== History ==
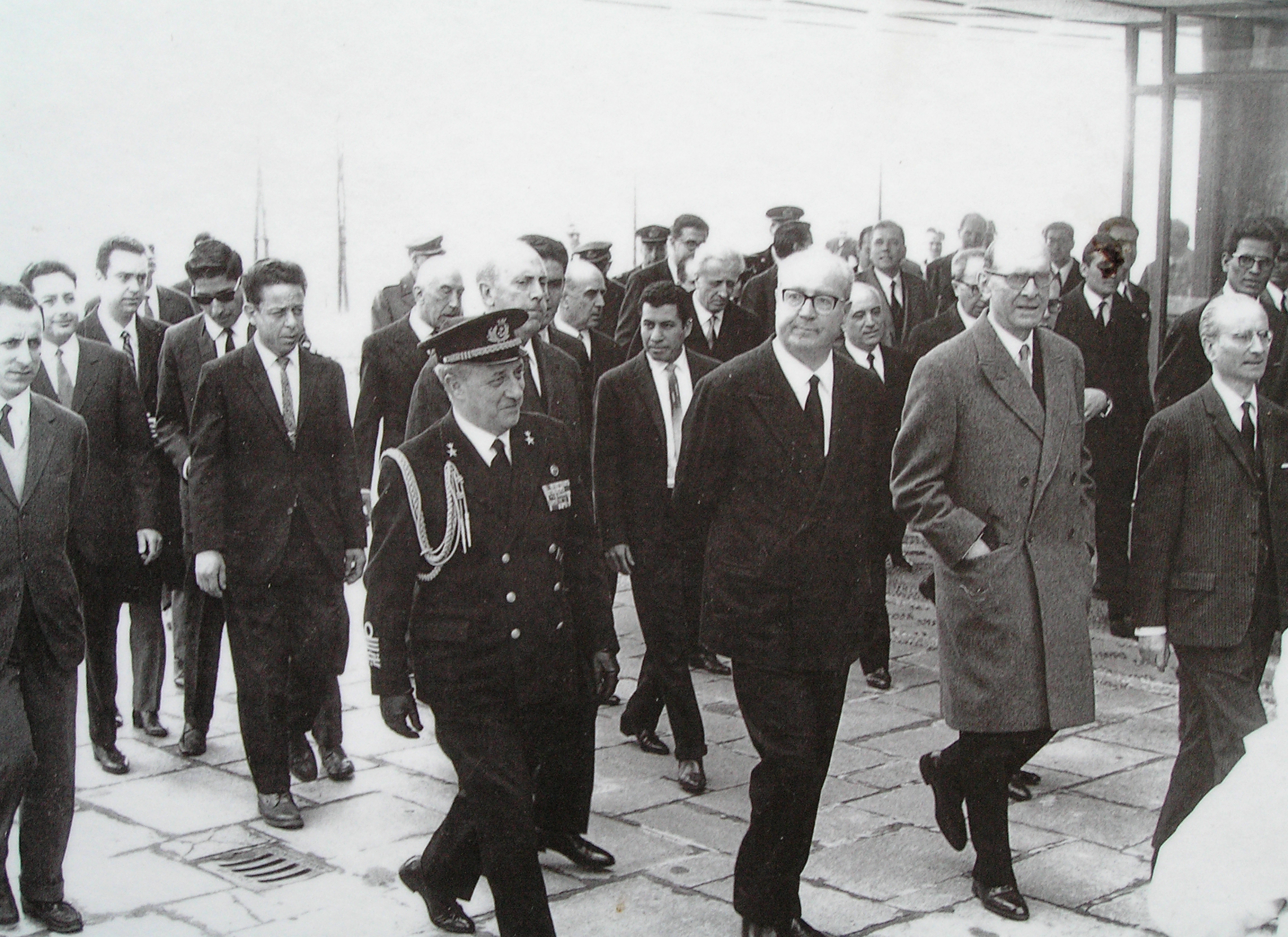
The President of the Italian Republic Mr. Giuseppe Saragat ITCILO

In the 1950s and 1960s, following decolonization, the Governing Body of the ILO sought a permanent facility that could produce agents of development for emerging nations. In 1961, the Italian Government, during the century of Italian unity celebrated in Turin, offered the "Italia 61" premises. In May 1963, the ILO's Governing Body unanimously adopted the centre's statute and established, in collaboration with the Italian Government, the International Training Centre on 24 October 1964. The agreement was signed by Giuseppe Saragat, Minister of Foreign Affairs, for the Italian Government, and by David A. Morse, Director-General for the ILO. By 1 October 1965, the International Centre for Advanced Technical and Vocational Training was opened.

== Training ==
Regular programmes are offered in a multicultural and multilingual environment at the campus, through e-learning on the ITCILO eCampus, or in a hybrid format that blends in-person and online learning. Tailor-made programmes are offered at the organizational, national or regional level.

Courses cover topics such as:

- Employment promotion
- Labour migration
- International labour standards
- Sustainable enterprises
- Enterprise development
- Green and social finance
- Responsible business conduct
- Social protection
- Social dialogue
- Innovation and future of work
- Sustainable development

== Turin campus ==
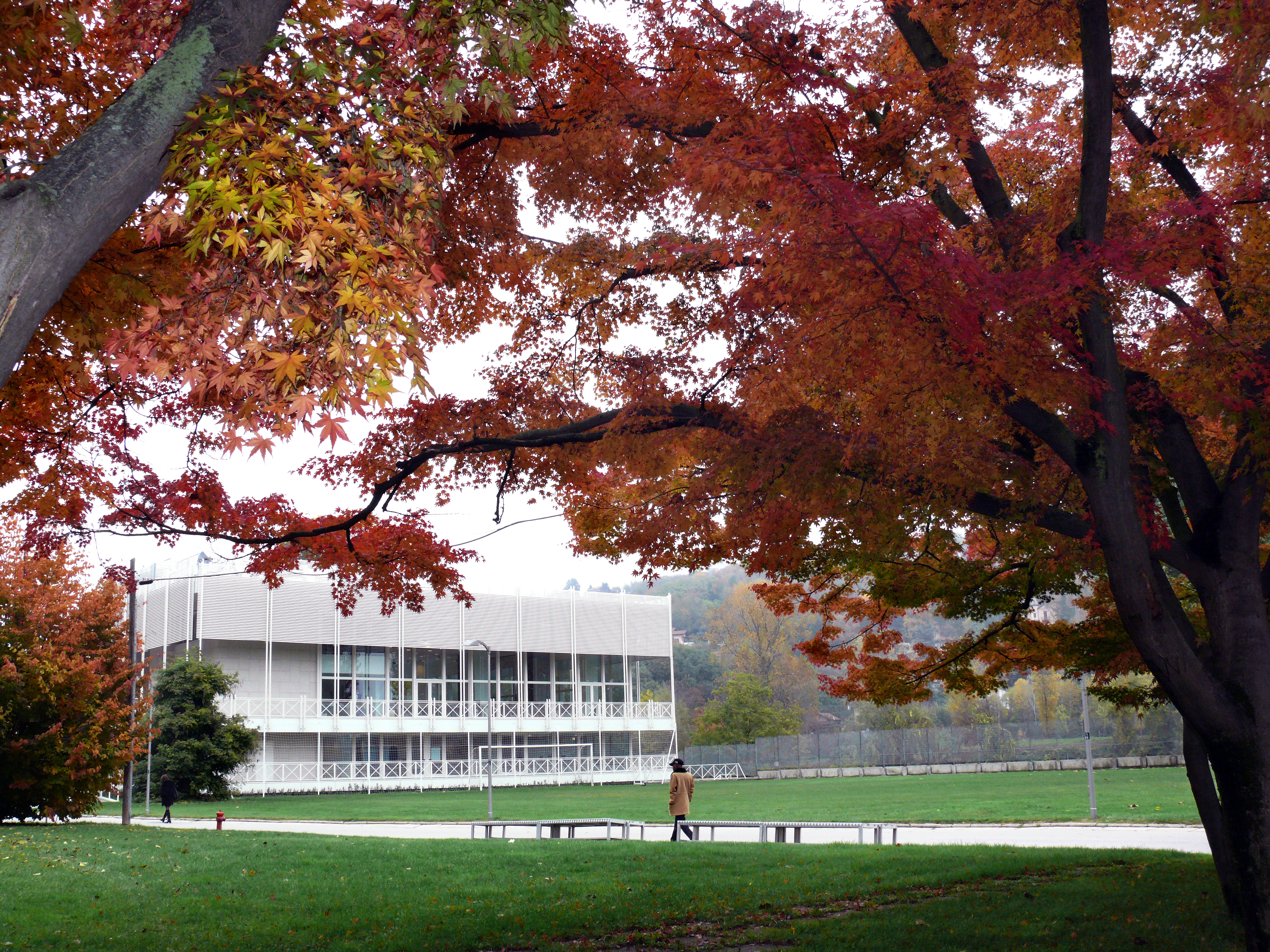
The ITCILO Turin Campus

On the Turin campus, located on the Po River, the buildings are organized into five clusters that represent the world's continents: the Americas, Africa, Asia, Europe and Oceania. The campus includes classrooms with interpretation and video conferencing equipment as well as an auditorium for seminars, workshops, and events. Participants stay in dormitories on campus for the duration of their course, usually from one week to five weeks.

The campus often hosts art exhibitions that focus on the topics of sustainability and global development. On 31 May 2022, on the occasion of the anniversary of the ratification of the UN Convention on the Rights of the Child, the campus opened the exhibition "Il Paese delle Meraviglie" (Wonderland) by Eugenio Bolley. It is dedicated to the children of Ukraine.

== Innovation ==
In 2020, the ITCILO, in collaboration with the City of Turin, hosted the presentation and testing of a self-driving mini shuttle bus called "Olli".

In 2021, the Government of Italy pledged to provide more than 3 million euros to fund the restructuring of the ITCILO campus. New additions will include an Innovation Lab.

== See also ==
- Turin
- International Labour Organization
- Decent work agenda of the ILO
- United Nations Global Compact, 1999–2000, encouraging businesses to adopt sustainable and socially responsible policies
- International Labour Organization Conventions
- Labour movement
- Social clause, the integration of seven core ILO labour rights conventions into trade agreements
- Globalization
- International labour standards
