= Lidia Poët =

Italian lawyer (1855–1949)

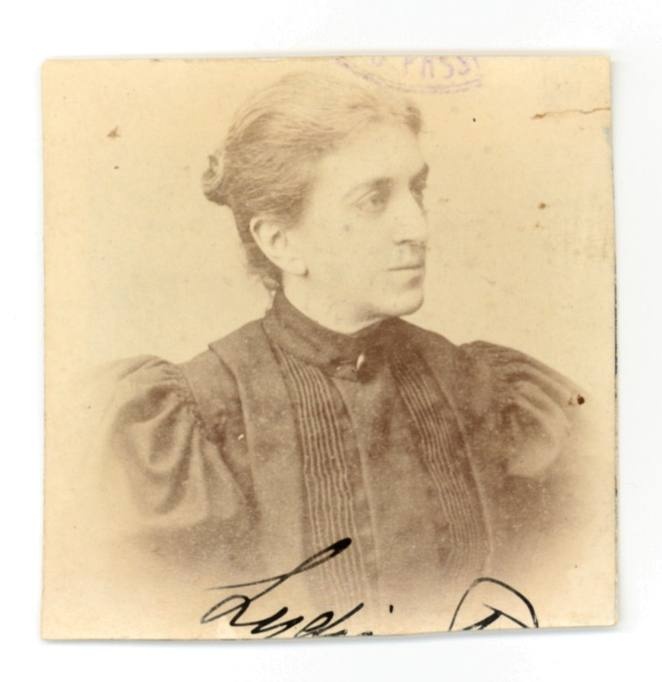
- Born: 26 August 1855; Perrero, Kingdom of Sardinia
- Died: 25 February 1949 (aged 93); Diano Marina, Italy
- Education: University of Turin (1881)
- Occupation: Lawyer

Lidia Poët (Italian pronunciation: [ˈliːdja poˈɛt]; 26 August 1855 – 25 February 1949) was the first modern female Italian lawyer. Her disbarment led to a movement to allow women to practice law and hold public office in Italy.

== Career ==
Poët was born in 1855 in the hamlet of Traverse, Perrero, in the Occitan-speaking Germanasca Valley, into a Waldensian family. She passed her law examinations at the Faculty of Law of the University of Turin and received her degree on 17 June 1881. For the following two years, she "attended forensic practice" in the office of a lawyer and assisted at the sessions of the tribunals. She then underwent the theoretical and practical examination of the Order of Lawyers of Turin and, approved by 45 of 50 votes, was enrolled in the roll of lawyers (albo degli avvocati) on 9 August 1883.

However, the enrollment of a woman on the roll "did not please" the office of the attorney general (procuratore generale), who entered a complaint with the Court of Appeal of Turin. Despite rejoinders, arguments, and examples of woman lawyers in other countries (such as Clara S. Foltz in the United States), the attorney general argued that women were forbidden by law and public policy to enter the judiciary (milizia togata). The Court of Appeal subsequently found that Poët's enrollment was illegal. She appealed to the Supreme Court of Cassation, but the decision of the lower court was confirmed in 1884 and Poët was precluded admission as a lawyer to the Turin bar association.

Following the decision of the Court of Cassation, Poët worked in the legal office of her brother, Enrico Poët, doing in practice the work of a lawyer even though she could not sign letters or plead in court. When her brother departed for Vichy in France each year, she took over the practice entirely, and when necessary, sought out male colleagues to plead in court on behalf of her clients.

== Later life ==
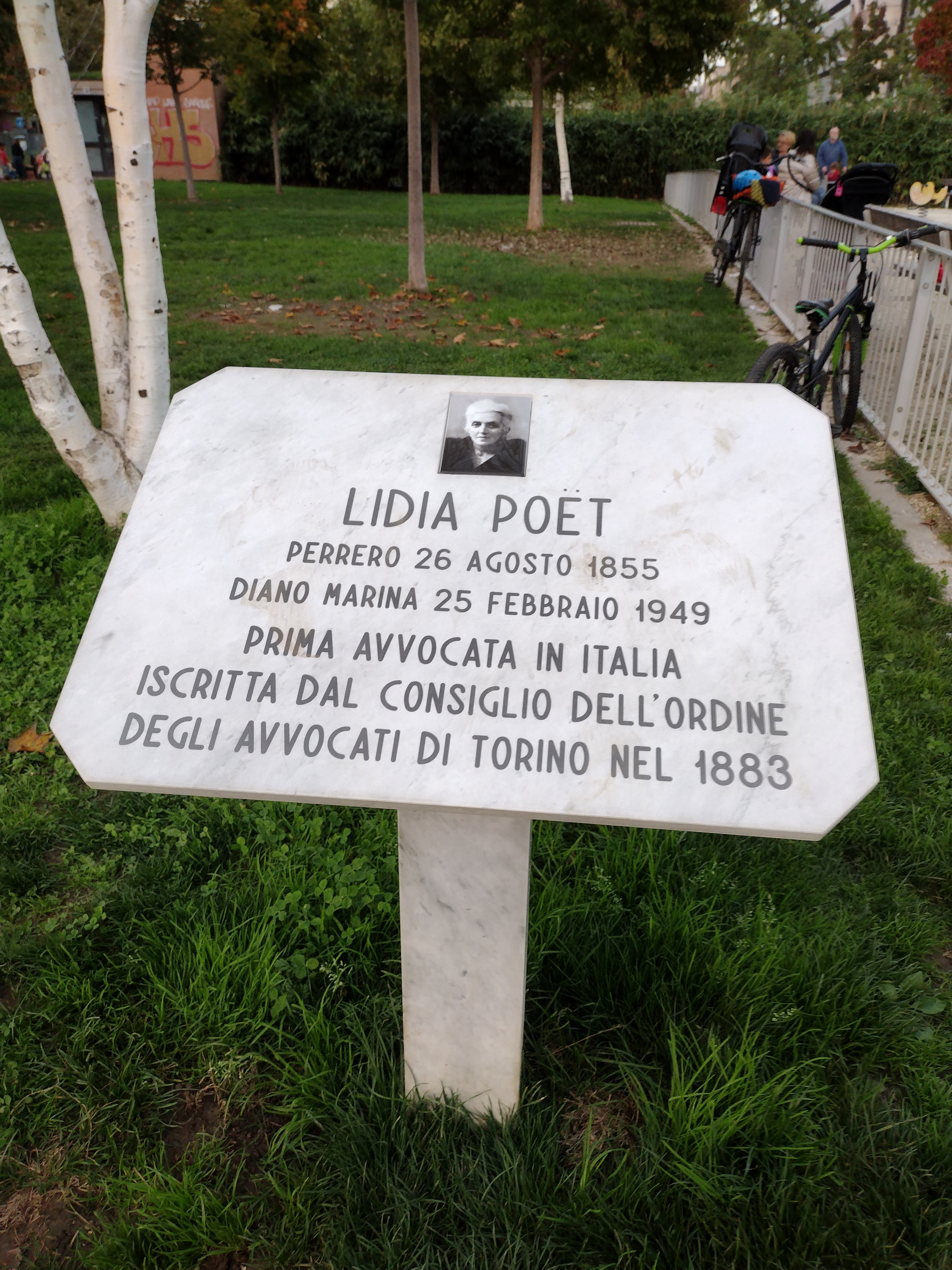
Memorial plaque for Lidia Poët in Turin

For the rest of her life, Poët was active in the international women's movement.

On 17 July 1919, Law n. 1176 allowed women to hold certain public offices. In 1920 Lidia Poët, by then aged 65, was enrolled in the Turin bar association, enlisted in the record of the members of the Council of Lawyers, and officially recognized as a lawyer.

She died in the seaside resort of Diano Marina in 1949.

== In popular culture ==
Lidia Poët's life is stylized in the Netflix TV series The Law According to Lidia Poët, where she is played by Matilda De Angelis.

== See also ==
- First women lawyers around the world

== Sources ==
- Albisetti, James C. (2000). "Portia ante portas. Women and the Legal Profession in Europe, ca. 1870-1925". Journal of Social History. 33 (4). Carnegie Mellon College of Humanities and Social Sciences: 825–857. doi:10.1353/jsh.2000.0051. Archived from the original on 28 May 2007.
- Bounous, Clara (1997). La toga negata. Da Lidia Poët all'attuale realtà torinese [The toga denied. From Lidia Poët to the current Turinese reality] (in Italian). Pinerolo: Alzani. ISBN 9788881700363.
- Raichich, Marino (1989). "Liceo, università, professioni: un percorso difficile" [High school, university, professions: a difficult path]. In Soldani, Simonetta (ed.). L'educazione delle donne: Scuole e modelli di vita femminile nell'Italia dell'Ottocento [The education of women: Schools and models of female life in 19th-century Italy] (in Italian). Milan: Angeli. pp. 151–53. ISBN 9788820431822.
- Ricci, Cristina (2022). Lidia Poët. Vita e battaglie della prima avvocata italiana, pioniera dell'emancipazione femminile [Lidia Poët. Life and battles of the first Italian lawyer, pioneer of female emancipation] (in Italian). Turin: Graphot & LAR. EAN 9791280629111.
- Santoni de Sio, Ferdinando (1884). La donna e l'avvocatura [Woman and the legal profession]. Rome: Tipografia della Nuova Roma.
- Throop, Montgomery Hunt (13 December 1884). "Woman and the Legal Profession". Albany Law Journal: 464–467.
