= WIPO Academy =

Training arm of the World Intellectual Property Organization

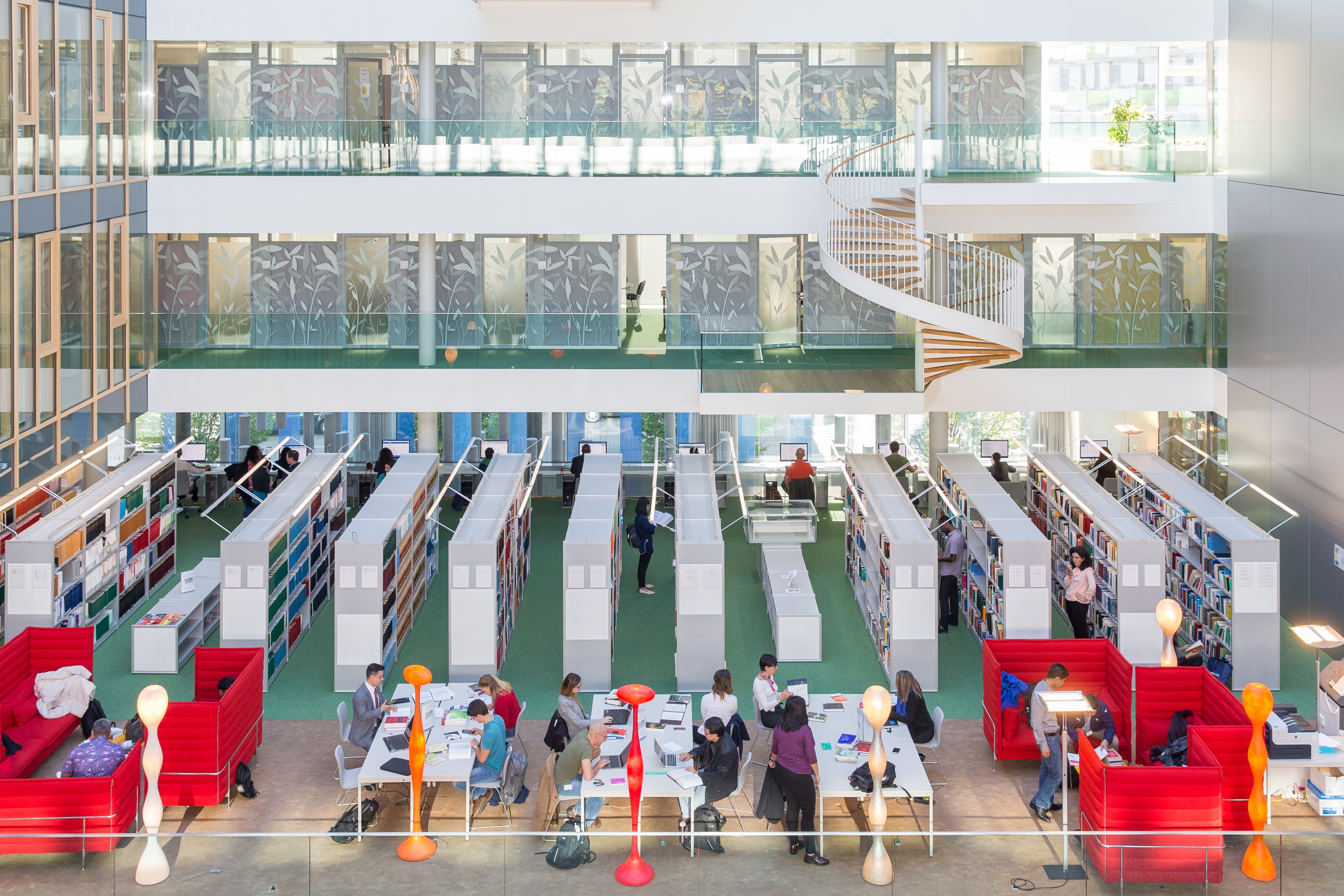
Students of the Master of Laws (LL.M.) in Intellectual Property jointly offered by the WIPO Academy and the University of Turin on a study visit to WIPO in 2017.

The WIPO Academy is the training arm of the World Intellectual Property Organization (WIPO), it was established in 1998. It offers intellectual property (IP) education, training and IP skills-building to government officials, inventors, creators, business professionals, small and medium enterprises (SMEs), academics, students and individuals interested in IP. The Academy hosts IP courses through its six programs: the Executive Training Program, IP eLearning, University Partnerships Program, WIPO Summer Schools, IP Training Institutions, and IP for Youth and Teachers.

== Executive Training ==
The Executive Training Program was launched in 2024 and is designed for entrepreneurs, innovators, business executives, IP professionals and government officials seeking to develop practical IP knowledge and skills to harness their innovative and creative potential for professional or business needs. Working with partner institutions around the world, these intensive one-week programs equip participants with practical IP tools and skills to develop, use and manage IP as a tool for growth and development.

== IP eLearning and IP for Youth and Teachers ==
Through WIPO Academy’s IP eLearning program, global access to online and hybrid IP courses at general and advanced levels in the six official languages of the United Nations (English, French, Spanish, Arabic, Russian and Chinese) as well as Portuguese is provided. The courses cover the main areas of IP theory (copyright, patents, and trademarks), IP management and policy, and practical IP skills. The general course on intellectual property (DL-101) is available in an accessible format for the visually impaired. Some of the DL courses, including the DL-101 are run in more than ten languages as a result of course customization and translation by particular countries.

In 2018, the WIPO Academy launched IP for Youth and Teachers to support national curricula setters, education policy makers and educators to integrate IP, creativity and innovation education in primary and secondary schools. Young innovators, creators and entrepreneurs who are users of the IP system are awarded with WIPO IP Youth Ambassadorships so they could inspire other young people to follow in their footsteps.

== University Partnerships and WIPO Summer Schools ==
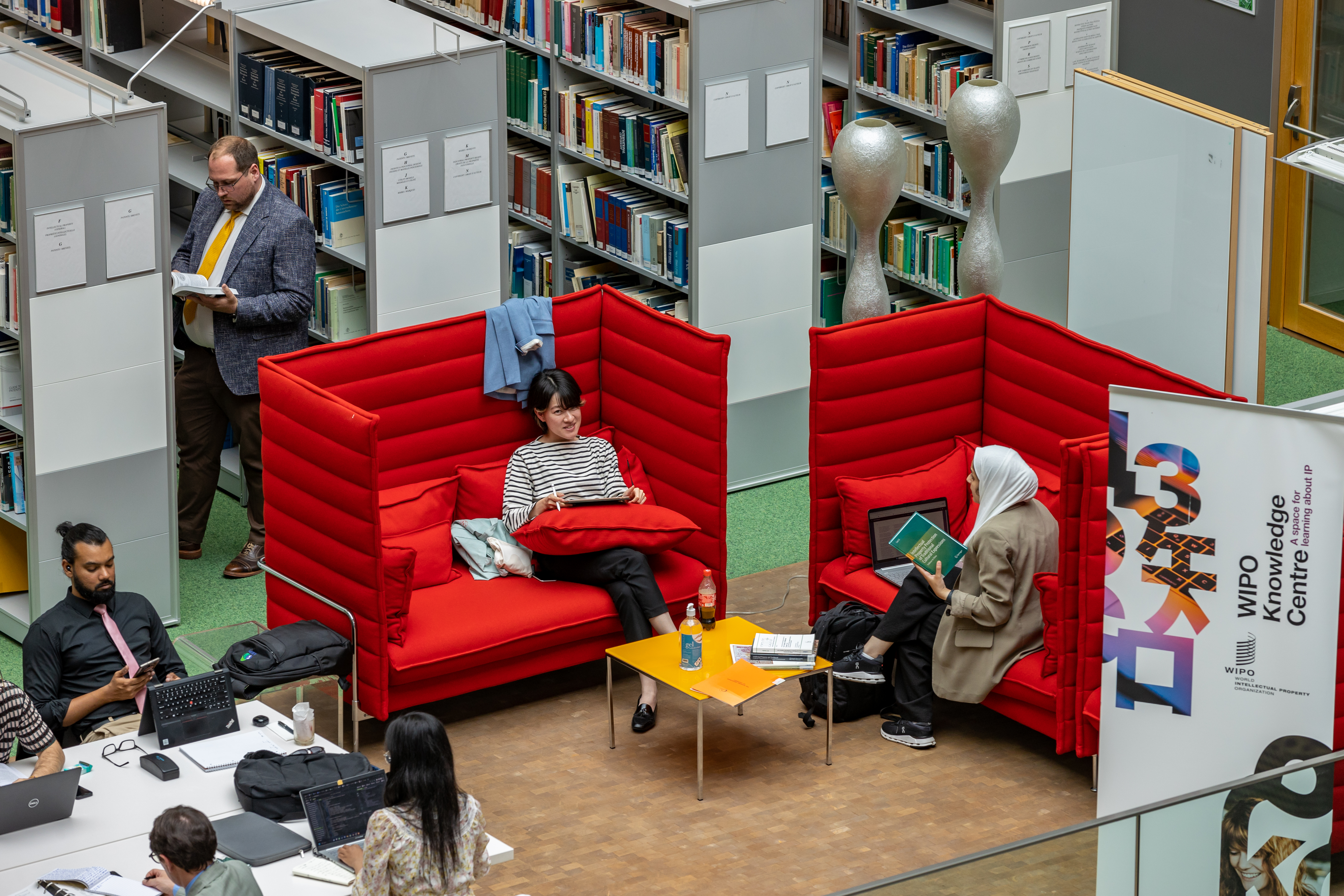
WIPO Academy students in the WIPO library in Geneva

The WIPO Academy also collaborates with universities to provide access to higher education on IP, especially for developing countries, least developed countries and 'countries in transition'. Its main focus in this area is a series of joint master's degree programs offered in English, French and Spanish. The joint master's degree programs are accredited by and offered in partnership with partner universities including Africa University, Ankara University, Jagiellonian University, KDI School, Tongji University, University of San Andrés, University of Turin, Singapore University of Social Sciences, IE University, National Law University Delhi, Umm Al-Qura University, Maqsut Narikbayev University, University of Nizwa, Université Mohammed VI Polytechnique de Ben Guerir, and University of Yaoundé II.

Under the University Partnerships Program, the Academy co-organizes a number of colloquia (informal meetings) and conferences for IP academics, researchers and teachers including the WIPO-WTO colloquiums for IP teachers.

== IP Training Institutions ==
The IP Training Institutions (IPTIs) Program supports countries in establishing their own IP training centers to meet their local IP training and skills-building needs in a scalable and cost-effective way. The IPTIs Program's main areas of support include the establishment of new IPTIs, delivering joint projects with established IPTIs, and offering collective services to IPTIs from networking to IP training courses.
