= Sidney Mear =

American trumpeter

Sidney Mear (June 23, 1918 – March 13, 2016) was an American trumpeter and professor at the Eastman School of Music in Rochester, New York. He studied with Herbert L. Clarke and Bohumir Kryl as a child in Whitewater, Wisconsin, and with Pattee Evenson at Eastman.

His solo performances were featured on many national radio broadcasts, including the hit number "Hot Lips", which was recorded in one take without rehearsal. He performed with Edwin Franko Goldman's 60-piece band during the 1939 Golden Gate International Exposition in San Francisco.

When he turned 19, Mear accepted a scholarship to attend Eastman School of Music and pursued his ambition to play in a symphony orchestra. He joined the Rochester Philharmonic three years later in 1940. His music is featured on recordings with the Eastman-Rochester Orchestra on the Mercury Living Presence record label. The CDs include solo performances in Samuel Barber's Capricorn Concerto, Copland's Quiet City, and Leroy Anderson's Trumpeter's Lullaby, which was recorded in a single take without rehearsal. From 1940 through 1942, Mear was a member of the Orquesta Sinfonica de Mexico under Carlos Chávez and in 1946 toured the United States and Canada with the Philadelphia Orchestra under Eugene Ormandy.

Sidney Mear was married to Elizabeth Irvine Fetter and had five children. His father, Samuel Edgar Mear, was a cornetist and composer and one of the earliest members of the American Bandmasters Association.
