= Karen L. Parker =

American journalist (born 1944)

Karen Lynn Parker (born September 22, 1944) is an American journalist. She is the first Black woman to attend the University of North Carolina at Chapel Hill as an undergraduate student.

== Early life and education ==
Parker was born in Salisbury, North Carolina and grew up in Winston-Salem, North Carolina. Her parents were Clarice Lucille (née Holt) and Fred Douglas Parker. Her father had a master's degree from Columbia University and taught chemistry at West Forsyth High School and Atkins High School. Her mother had a master's degree from the University of Michigan and taught French and English at Atkins High School, Paisley High School, and William Penn High School.

Parker graduated from Atkins High School in Winston-Salem in 1961, which had an all-Black student population. She attended the North Carolina Women's College in Greensboro (now University of North Carolina at Greensboro). She decided to attend the college because she and her parents believed integration was important; she was one of five Black students at the Women's College.

During her freshman year, she filled in for Winston-Salem Journal newspaper's Black reporter, Luix Overbea, for two weeks, writing about the Black community for the Sunday newspaper. In the summer of 1963, Parker was an intern with the Winston-Salem Journal and Sentinel Communique newspaper. Overbea encouraged Parker to apply to the School of Journalism at the University of North Carolina at Chapel Hill (UNC).

In the fall of 1963, she transferred to the School of Journalism at UNC. She was the first Black woman undergraduate to attend UNC. As a student there, she participated in Civil Rights sit-ins and marches and was involved with the Congress of Racial Equality (CORE). She was arrested twice and spent a night in the Orange County Jail for her role in a sit in protest.

While at UNC, she was the vice-president of the UNC Press Club, participated in the exchange program with the University of Toronto, and made the Dean's List. Her senior year, she was the editor of the UNC Journalist, the School of Journalism's experimental newspaper; this position was one of the school's top honors. Editors were selected based on experience in journalism, scholarship, and character. She also received a merit scholarship from the School of Journalism for her senior year. She was also admitted to the women's honor society, the Order of the Valkyries.

She graduated with a bachelor's degree in journalism in 1965, becoming the first Black woman to earn an undergraduate degree from UNC.

== Career ==
After graduating from UNC, she was a copy editor for The Grand Rapids Press in Grand Rapids, Michigan. She worked for the Los Angeles Times for some fifteen years where she was a copy editor and the Sunday news editor until March 31, 1993. She left Los Angeles as part of a buy out when the newspaper downsized its staff and then worked in Salt Lake City, Utah. Later, she became a copy editor with the Winston-Salem Journal. She retired in 2010.

== Awards and honors ==
In 2004, Parker received the Beech Outstanding Alumni Award from the University of North Carolina at Chapel Hill. She received The Union Baptist Church Legacy Award in 2005 for her literary contributions that have helped preserve Black history. In 2012, she was inducted into the North Carolina Journalism Hall of Fame.

In 2016, UNC created the Karen L. Park Grant awarded to as many as 25 students a year starting in 2017. In 2021, Parker was added to the Honorific Naming Registry at UNC, placing her in the running as a potential namesake of buildings previously named for a Confederate.

== Legacy ==
The Karen L. Parker archival collection is housed in Wilson Library at UNC. In 2006, she donated a diary that she kept during her undergraduate years to the Southern Historical Collection at UNC's Wilson Library. Her diary is significant for its coverage of her experiences during the Civil Rights movement. Ellyn Bache used Parker's diary when conducting research for her 1997 novel The Activist's Daughter, about student activists at the University of North Carolina at Chapel Hill in 1963, and based a character on Parker.

== Personal life ==
Parker married and took a ten-year break from journalism to raise her son, Jonah Kuttner. Her second husband is Christopher Roe, a court recorder originally from Salt Lake City. She married her third husband, Barry Lambert, in 1996; he was her former fiance from college and is a supervisor with the U.S. Postal Service. Parker and Lambert lived in Greensboro, North Carolina.

She served on the board of directors of the UNC General Alumni Association and the board of the UNC Friends of the Library.
