= Rudolf Schlesinger =

- Born: 1909; Munich, Bavaria, Germany
- Died: November 10, 1996 (aged 86–87)
- Occupation: Legal scholar

Rudolf Berthold Schlesinger (1909 – 10 November 1996) was a German American legal scholar known for his contributions to the study of comparative law, a discipline that examines the differences and similarities among the legal systems of nations.

== Biography ==
Schlesinger was the son of a lawyer and a relative of bankers. He was born in Munich, Bavaria, Germany, in 1909. His father was American, which is why Schlesinger acquired dual citizenship per jus sanguinis. As he was growing up, he exhibited especial intellectual abilities, but also a great interest for sports and art. He completed his doctoral thesis on commercial law, earning his degree in law from the Ludwig-Maximilians-Universität München in 1933. He then worked as a lawyer for the bank that years before had been founded by his predecessors. He developed a background in finance while also helping German Jews transfer their assets out of the country in order to escape Nazi persecution.

In 1938, with the Nazi party gaining strength, Schlesinger, who was Jewish, immigrated to the United States. Soon, he enrolled in the Columbia Law School, where he became the first, and perhaps the only, nonnative English-speaking editor of the Columbia Law Review. He graduated first in his class in 1942 and started working as an assistant to a New York Supreme Court judge. He briefly worked at Milbank, Tweed, Hadley & McCloy, a renowned New York law firm; however, in 1948 he moved into academia and started teaching in the Cornell Law School, where he later became a professor of comparative law.

He also wrote important studies of civil procedure and international business transactions and directed a ten-year international research project on contracts.

In 1975, he left, as Professor Emeritus, and became a professor in the University of California's Hastings College of the Law, until his retirement in 1995. Schlesinger and his wife, Ruth Hirschland Schlesinger, both died on November 10, 1996, in San Francisco, California, an apparent double suicide.

== Schlesinger and comparative law ==
Schlesinger had an enormous impact on U.S. and European legal studies. Foremost was his pioneering 1950 book on comparative law, Comparative Law: Cases, Text, Materials, which ultimately influenced two generations of readers. His arrival in the field during the early 1950s helped to give it both greater legitimacy and popularity in legal academia. His book Comparative Law: Cases, Texts, Materials (1950), written while Schlesinger taught at Cornell University, became a staple of law school curricula and entered its fifth edition in the late 1990s.

In 1955, working on behalf of the New York Law Revision Commission, he examined the important question of whether to codify commercial law. His study, "Problems of Codification of Commercial Law" (1955), paralleled the development of the Uniform Commercial Code. In 1995 the American Journal of Comparative Law published a tribute to Schlesinger that praised the brilliance of his "heroic work" and noted that its influence went beyond U.S. law: "Today's serious efforts to find and develop a unitary European private law is, consciously or unconsciously, a continuation of Schlesinger's effort." In the 1960s Schlesinger launched the Cornell project on "Formation of Contract. A Study on the common core of legal systems" which deployed the entirely original methodology of the "factual approach" in comparative legal scholarship. The result of the Cornell seminars is a two-volume book published by Oceana in 1968 under Schlesinger's editorship. In 1993 Schlesinger's successor at Hastings Ugo Mattei together with Italian comparativist Mauro Bussani launched the "Common Core of European Private Law Project" deploying the Cornell factual approach to study European contract, property and tort law. The results of the common core project that "on the shoulders of Schlesinger" involves some two hundred scholars from all over the world are published in an ongoing series at Cambridge University Press.

== Bibliography ==
- Mattei, Ugo; Ruskola, Teemu; Gidi, Antonio (2009). Schlesinger's Comparative Law. London: Foundation. ISBN 978-1-58778-591-7.
- Moustaira Elina N., Milestones in the Course of Comparative Law: Thesis and Antithesis (in Greek), Ant. N. Sakkoulas Publishers, Athens, 2003, ISBN 960-15-1097-4
- Buxbaum, Richard M.; Mattei, Ugo A. (1997). "Rudolph B. Schlesinger 1909-1996". American Journal of Comparative Law. 45 (1): 1–4. doi:10.1093/ajcl/45.1.1. JSTOR 840957.
