= Rodolfo Sacco =

Italian legal scholar (1923–2022)

Rodolfo Sacco (21 November 1923 – 21 March 2022) was an Italian legal scholar.

== Biography ==
Born in Fossano, Italy, he was professor emeritus at the University of Turin, Faculty of Law. He was a prominent legal scholar and a well-known comparative lawyer in Europe.

Sacco continued to teach and publish extensively on the topics of comparative law, legal harmonization and private law. He has authored numerous articles in the leading French and American journals. He has served as the President of the Latin Group of the International Academy of Comparative Law; he is particularly well known as a civilian scholar in the French tradition. However, his international reputation is that of one of the founding fathers of the rich comparative law tradition that is now dominant in European circles. Sacco has also served as the President of the International Association of Legal Science (UNESCO).

Sacco died on 21 March 2022, at the age of 98.

== See also ==
- University of Turin, Faculty of Law
- Comparative Law
