= International University College of Turin =

Coordinates: 45.064201°N 7.679331°E

- Motto: The College of the Commons
- Type: Commons Free University
- Established: 2006
- Students: 500 since foundation
- Location: Turin, Piedmont, Italy
- Campus: Urban
- Website: http://www.iuctorino.org/

The International University College of Turin, or IUC Turin, is an independent University founded in 2006 with a grant from the Compagnia di San Paolo and Consiglio Nazionale del Notariato. Teaching at IUC focuses on the interdisciplinary and critical study of law, economics and finance. The IUC is located in the periphery of the city of Turin, Italy. The Founding President of IUC is Franzo Grande Stevens. Stefano Rodotà served as President until 2014.

As of 2025, the President is Edoardo Reviglio. In 2022 the IUC moved to the current location in Campus Leone Ginzburg Via Cigna 37, Turin

== Purpose and programme ==
The reported aim of the IUC is to further the study of global capitalism and the preparation of an international class of lawyers and finance experts, with a critical policy orientation. The IUC offers a two-year Master of Science in Comparative Law, Economics and Finance (MSc CLEF) degree. Starting in academic year 2010–11, the IUC began offering a one-year LL.M. degree whose title is jointly offered together with University of Turin, University of Eastern Piedmont and Carlo Alberto College.

In Academic Year 2016-2017, after its first ten years of existence, IUC offered a Master of Research in Food Law and Finance program. The degree program was held in English and granted jointly with the Università Scienze Gastronomiche, established in Pollenzo by Slow Food. The degree was discontinued in 2018 but the study of the global food chain became part of the general curriculum.

The IUC is a center for the interdisciplinary and critical study of law, economics, finance and the commons. Teachers and students gather in Turin to examine the phenomenon of globalization with a particular attention to the conception of achievable long-period policies to govern its effects. To do so, research at the IUC explores the great variety of financial and institutional settings across the world in their analogies and differences to obtain a more realistic and scientific grasp on current global transformations. An example of this approach is the IUC Report "At the End of the End of History. Global Legal Standards: Part of the Solution or Part of the Problem?", which was presented at the Seminar "Global Standards in the 21st Century" organized by the G-8 Presidency in Rome in May 2009. The Report calls for a broader understanding of markets and the structural impact of legal institutions on their unfolding needs, and issues a challenge to the biases produced by mainstream theory, while proposing solutions for the harms caused by the financial and economic crisis.

The teaching and scholarly interest for the commons as an institutional setting for a more ecologically compatible anthropocene has been a recognisable focus of IUC. More than 95% of IUC Alumni have received the sort of financial aid that equals free education.

== Faculty and academic partnership ==
The faculty at IUC is a mix of younger academics on a full-time basis and of associate faculty including Guido Calabresi (former Dean of the Yale Law School), Duncan Kennedy (Harvard Law School), Joseph Halevi, (Emeritus of Sidney University), Jan Toporowsky (SOAS), Günter Frankenberg (Frankfurt). Additionally, Gunther Teubner (Goethe University Frankfurt) held a Jean Monnet "ad personam" chair at the International University College of Turin from 2011 to 2013, and served for 2 years as an Academic Coordinator. Former Greek Finance Minister Yanis Varoufakis is an Honorary Professor at IUC. Slow Food Founder Carlo Petrini received an Honoris Causa Master of Research at IUC in 2012 and serves as one of the Directors of the new Food Law and Finance project. The tenth anniversary of IUC was celebrated in January 2017 with a distinguished lecture given by ecologist and system theorist Fritjof Capra.

The funding and IUC Academic Coordinator is Ugo Mattei, full Professor at the universities of California Hastings and Turin. The Director is Giuseppe Mastruzzo PhD.

IUC Turin has partnerships, for student and academic exchanges, with the following universities:

- University of Fribourg
- Universidad Pompeu Fabra
- UC Hastings College of the Law
- Lanzhou University
- Universidad de Chile
- Universidad Torcuato di Tella
- Universidad Nacional Mayor de San Marcos
- Université de Bamako, Mali
- National Law School of India University
- Universidad San Francisco Xavier de Chuquisaca (Sucre, Bolivia)
- University of Eastern Piedmont "Amedeo Avogadro", Faculty of Law

== Campus ==
The IUC Torino campus is located in the Aurora area of Torino, in via Cigna 37, at the corner with via Pesaro.
