= Grace (given name) =

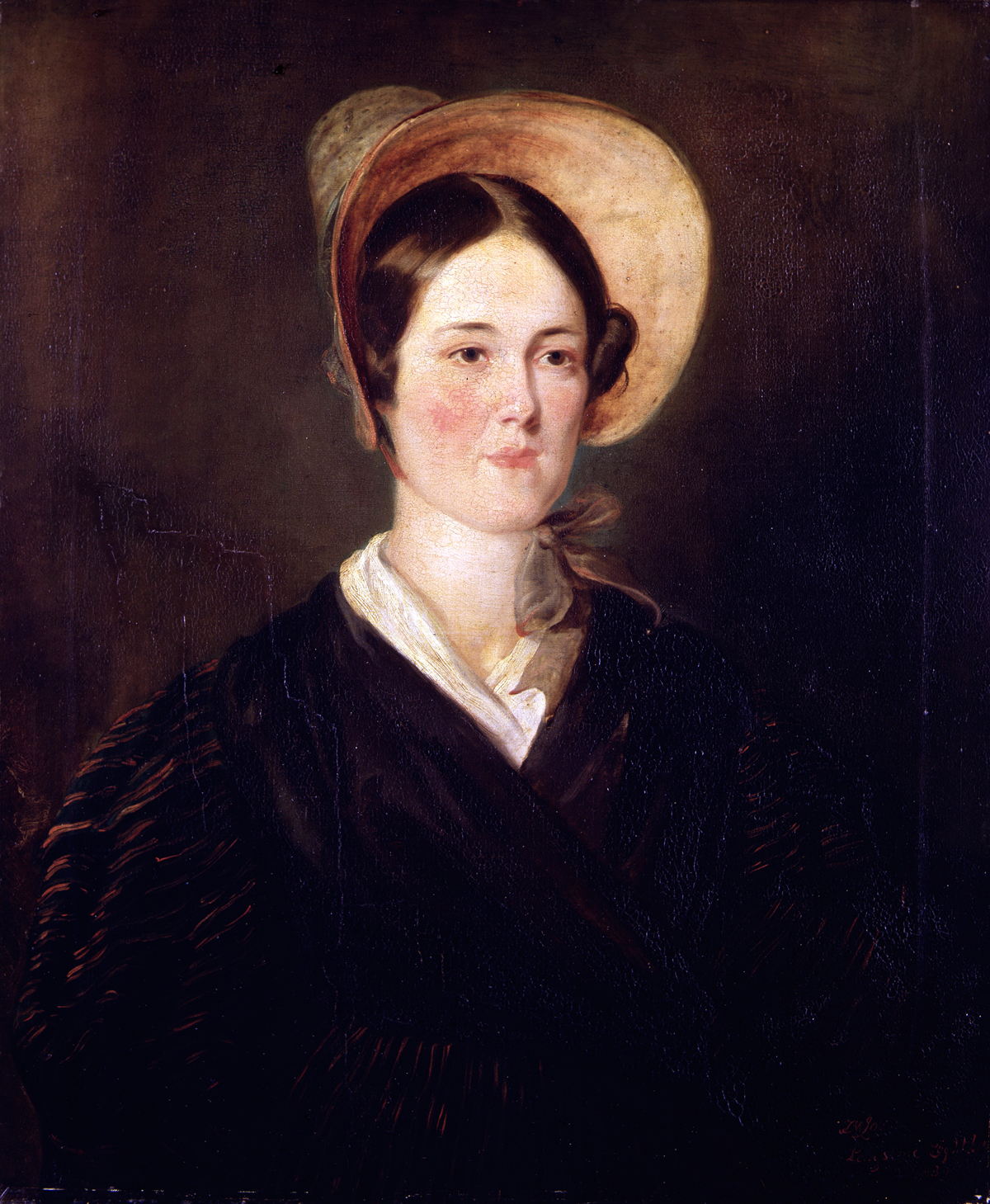
- Grace Darling (1815–1842) popularized the name Grace in the Anglosphere.
- Gender: Female

Origin
- Language: Latin
- Meaning: Gracious

Other names
- Usage: Anglosphere
- Related names: Gracie, Graciela, Graziella

Grace is a female name from the Latin gratia. It is often given in reference to the Christian concept of divine grace and used as a virtue name. As one of the theological virtues, Grace was in regular use by English Puritans in the 16th through the 18th centuries. The name also has connotations of physical grace, beauty, and charm.

The name was revived in the mid 19th century and was popularized in the Anglosphere by the fame of Grace Darling, a British woman who saved nine people from a shipwreck in 1838. Usage of the name increased for British girls in the late 1830s and 1840s. Many British and Irish girls named Grace then immigrated to the United States, where they passed the name Grace down to their descendants. Grace declined in use in the United Kingdom after 1870, but ranked among the top 100 names given to American girls from the 1860s to the late 1930s. The name was out of fashion from the 1940s through the 1980s, but rose in popularity in the Anglosphere after 1990. Usage of the name increased due to popular culture influences such as a character on the American television comedy series Will and Grace, which originally aired from 1998 to 2006. Grace has been a particularly well-used name in the United States throughout the 20th and 21st centuries for women and girls whose families are from a Chinese, Japanese, or Korean background. The names is often chosen for women of East Asian descent due to its Christian religious significance or because it is an English translation of a Chinese, Japanese, or Korean name with a similar meaning.

== Variants ==
- French: Grâce
- English, diminutive: Gracie
- Albanian: Greis, Graciela
- Italian: Grazia, Graziella
- Indonesian: Grace, Graciela, Gratia, Gracia
- Latin: Gratia
- Polish: Gracja
- Portuguese: Graça, Gracília
- Spanish: Gracia, Graciela
- Basque: Garazi
- Bulgarian: Грация
- Serbo-Croatian: Gracija
- Romanian: Grațiela

== Notable people ==
=== A ===
- Grace Abbott (1878–1939), American social worker
- Grace Aboh (born 1943), Beninese activist, entrepreneur
- Grace Adams (born 1995), Ghanaian footballer
- Grace Aguilar (1816–1847), English novelist and writer on Jewish history and religion
- Grace Akallo (21st century), Ugandan child soldier
- Grace Akello (born c. 1940), Ugandan poet, essayist, folklorist and politician
- Grace Albee (1890–1985), American printmaker and wood engraver
- Grace Alekhine (1876–1956), American-British-French female artist and chess master
- Grace Alele-Williams (1932–2022), Nigerian mathematician and university vice-chancellor
- Grace Alexander (1872–1951), American writer, journalist, teacher
- Grace d'Almeida (1951–2005), Beninese lawyer, feminist and human rights activist
- Grace Greenwood Ames (1905–1979), American artist who worked predominantly in Mexico
- Grace Andreacchi (born 1954), American-born author
- Grace Andrews (mathematician) (1869–1951), American mathematician
- Grace Apiafi (born 1958), Nigerian shot putter and discus thrower
- Grace Arnold (1899–1979), English actress
- Grace Ayensu, Ghanaian politician

=== B ===
- Mary Grace Baloyo (died 2001), First Lieutenant in the Philippine Air Force
- Grace Bannister (1924–1986), Unionist politician in Northern Ireland
- Grace Bardsley (1920–1972), Australian Aboriginal rights activist and political activist
- Grace Barnsley (1896–1975), English pottery decorator
- Grace Bauer, American poet
- Grace Bawden (born 1992), Australian classical crossover singer
- Grace Bedell (1848–1936), American woman who influenced Abraham Lincoln to grow his famous beard
- Grace Alatta Bell, Member of the parliament of Bermuda
- Grace Benham (1876–1968), American silent film actress
- Grace Folashade Bent (born 1960), Nigerian politician
- Grace Berger (born 1999), American basketball player
- Grace Beverley (born 1997), English entrepreneur, influencer, and podcaster
- Grace Bilger (1907–2000), American artist
- Grace Birungi (born 1973), Ugandan runner
- Grace Blakeley (born 1993), English economics and politics commentator, columnist, journalist and author
- Grace Budd (died 1928), American murder victim
- Grace Lee Boggs (1915–2015), Chinese-American author, social activist and feminist
- Grace Bonney (born 1981), American author, blogger, and entrepreneur
- Grace Bowman (equestrian) (born 1990), Australian Paralympic equestrian
- Grace Duffie Boylan (1861?–1935), American writer
- Grace Bradley (1913–2010), American film actress
- Grace Brown (1886–1906), American skirt factory worker who was murdered
- Grace Brown (born 1992), Australian cyclist
- Grace Mann Brown (1859–1925), American writer and spiritual leader
- Grace Cuthbert-Browne (1900–1988), Australian medical doctor
- Grace Bumbry (1937–2023), American opera singer
- Grace Burbridge (1887–?), British suffragette, burned whilst setting fire to a postbox
- Grace Bussell (1860–1935), Australian heroine, involved in the rescue of the SS Georgette
- Grace Butler (1886–1962), New Zealand artist
- Grace Byers, Caymanian-American actress

=== C ===
- Grace Carlson (1906–1992), American communist politician
- Grace Carter (born 1989), British volleyball player
- Grace Cassidy (born 1993), English actress
- Grace Cavalieri (born 1932), American poet, playwright and broadcaster
- Grace Chan (born 1991), Canadian actress, television host, and beauty pageant titleholder
- Grace Chang (born 1933), Chinese actress and singer
- Grace Chatto (born 1985), English musician and singer
- Grace Chia, Singaporean writer, poet, journalist and editor
- Grace Zia Chu (1899–1999), American author of Chinese cookbooks
- Grace Clements (artist) (1905–1969), American artist
- Grace Clements (athlete) (born 1984), English heptathlete
- Grace Stone Coates (1881–1976), American writer
- Grace Coddington (born 1941), British former model and creative director of American Vogue magazine
- Grace Colman (1892–1971), British politician
- Grace Comiskey (c. 1894–1956), American owner of the Chicago White Sox
- Grace Conkling (1878–1958), American writer
- Grace Corbett (c. 1765/1770–1843), Scottish author and poet
- Grace Coolidge (1879–1957), First Lady of the United States; wife of President Calvin Coolidge
- Grace Inez Crawford (1889–1977), Paris-born England-based American singer, actress, costume designer, translator of plays and writer
- Grace Noll Crowell (1877–1969), American poet
- Grace Crowley (1890–1979), Australian artist
- Grace Cunard (1893–1967), American actress, screenwriter and film director
- Grace Curzon, Marchioness Curzon of Kedleston (1879–1958), American socialite

=== D ===
- Grace Daley (born 1978), American professional women's basketball player
- Grace Darling (1815–1842), Northumbrian Victorian heroine
- Grace Darmond (1893–1963), Canadian-born American actress
- Grace Montañez Davis (1926–2020), Mexican-American political activist and deputy mayor of Los Angeles
- Grace Davison, American silent-movie actress
- Grace de Laguna (1878–1978), American philosopher and academic
- Grace DeMoss (born 1927), American amateur golfer
- Grace Dent (born 1973), English journalist, author and broadcaster
- Grace Diaz (born 1957), Dominican-American politician
- Grace Hoadley Dodge (1856–1914), American philanthropist
- Grace A. Dow (1869–1953), American philanthropist
- Grace L. Drake, American politician
- Grace Drayton (1877–1936), American comics artist
- Grace Marguerite Hay Drummond-Hay (1895–1946), British journalist and aviation pioneer
- Grace Dunham (born 1992), American poet and actress

=== E ===
- Grace Ekpiwhre (born 1949), Nigerian civil servant
- Grace Elizabeth (born 1997), American fashion model
- Grace Elliott (1758–1823), Scottish socialite and courtesan

=== F ===
- Grace Fernald (1879–1950), American educational psychologist
- Grace Flandrau (1886–1971), American writer
- Grace Fong, American musician and academic
- Grace Fortescue (1883–1979), American socialite
- Grace Frankland (1858–1946), English microbiologist
- Grace Fryer (1899–1933), American dialpainter
- Grace Voss Frederick (1905–2009), American actress and museum curator
- Grace Beacham Freeman (1916–2002), American poet, columnist, short story writer and educator
- Grace Fu (born 1964), Singaporean politician
- Grace Fulton (born 1996), American actress

=== G ===
- Grace Gao (born 1989), Canadian badminton player
- Grace Garland, American singer-songwriter and actress
- Grace Gassette (1871–1955), American artist and sculptor
- Grace George (1879–1961), American stage actress
- Grace Gibson (1905–1989), American radio producer who worked predominantly in Australia
- Grace Gifford (1888–1955), Irish artist and cartoonist
- Grace Gill-McGrath (born 1989), Australian soccer player
- Grace Glowicki, Canadian actress and filmmaker
- Grace Golden (1904–1993), English illustrator and historian
- Grace Goodell, American anthropologist
- Grace Grace (born 1958), Australian politician
- Grace Graupe-Pillard, American painter
- Grace Winifred Green (1907–1976), New Zealand radio broadcaster and journalist
- Grace Gregory (1901–1985), American film set decorator
- Grace Griffith, American folk and Celtic singer
- Grace Groner (1909–2010), American philanthropist
- Grace Gummer (born 1986), American actress

=== H ===
- Grace Eleanor Hadow (1875–1940), English author and academic
- Grace Halsell (1923–2000), American journalist and writer
- Grace Towns Hamilton (1907–1992), African-American politician
- Grace Hanagan (1906–1995), Canadian survivor of the sinking of the Empress of Ireland (1914)
- Grace Harris (1993), Australian cricketer
- Grace Hartigan (1922–2008), American abstract expressionist painter
- Grace Hartman (actress) (1907–1955), American stage and musical theater actress
- Grace Hartman (politician) (1900–1998), Canadian social activist and politician
- Grace Hartman (trade unionist) (1918–1993), Canadian labour union activist
- Grace Raymond Hebard (1861–1936), American historian, suffragist, writer and political economist
- Grace Helbig (born 1985), American comedian
- Grace Henderson (1860–1944), American stage and silent-film actress
- Grace Hightower (born 1955), American philanthropist, actress and singer
- Grace Livingston Hill (1865–1947), American novelist
- Grace Webster Haddock Hinsdale (1832–1902), American author
- Grace Hirst (1805–1901), New Zealand businesswoman, farmer, nurse and midwife
- Grace Ho (1907–1996), Chinese mother of Bruce Lee
- Grace Hopper (1906–1992), American computer scientist
- Grace Huang (born 1983), Australian actress
- Grace Hudson (1865–1937), American painter
- Grace Hughes-Hallett (born 1986), British documentary filmmaker and podcaster
- Grace Hyland, Australian internet personality and LGBTQ rights activist

=== I ===
- Grace Ingalls (1877–1941), American journalist and youngest sister of novelist Laura Ingalls Wilder
- Grace Ives (born 1995), American singer-songwriter

=== J ===
- Grace Jackson (born 1961), Jamaican athlete
- Grace James (1864–1930), British writer of children's literature
- Grace Jantzen (1948–2006), Canadian feminist philosopher and theologian
- Grace Jane Joel (1865–1924), New Zealand artist
- Grace Mott Johnson (1882–1967), American artist
- Grace Jones (born 1948), Jamaican-born singer, actress and model
- Grace Jordan (1892–1985), American writer and journalist

=== K ===
- Grace Kamaikui (1808–1866), Hawaiian high chief
- Grace Kaufman (born 2002), American actress
- Grace Keagy (1921–2009), American actress
- Grace Keeling (born 1999), English influencer and presenter known as GK Barry
- Grace Kelly (1929–1982), American actress who became Princess Grace of Monaco
- Grace Kelly (musician) (born 1992), American musician
- Grace Kennedy (writer) (1782–1825), Scottish writer
- Grace Kennedy (singer) (born 1958), British singer and television presenter
- Grace Kim (born 2000), Australian professional golfer
- Grace Ji-Sun Kim (born 1969), Korean-American theologian and professor
- Grace Kimmins (1871–1954), British philanthropist
- Grace King (1852–1932), American writer
- Grace Knight (born 1955), English-born Australian musician
- Grace F. Knoche (1909–2006), American Theosophist, leader of the Theosophical Society
- Grace Anne Dorney Koppel, American lawyer and health activist
- Grace Krilanovich (born 1979), American writer
- Grace Lynn Kung (born 1987), Canadian actress

=== L ===
- Grace La Rue (1882–1956), American actress, singer, and Vaudeville performer
- Grace Lau (born 1991), Hong Kong karateka
- Grace Lee (born 1982), Korean television host and radio disc jockey
- Grace Etsuko Lee, Japanese-born American author, speaker, trainer, international business woman
- Grace Lin, American children's author, and illustrator
- Grace Denio Litchfield (1849–1944), American novelist, poet
- Grace Llewellyn (born 1964), American educator, author and publisher
- Grace Annie Lockhart (1855–1916), Canadian, first woman in the British Empire to receive a bachelor's degree
- Grace Loh (born 1991), Australian swimming champion
- Grace Lorch (c. 1903–1974), American teacher and civil rights activist
- Grace Lumpkin (1891–1980), American writer
- Grace Lyons (cricketer) (born 2005), Australian cricketer

=== M ===
- Grace Maccarone, children's book editor and author
- Grace MacInnis (1905–1991), Canadian politician and feminist
- Grace Madden (1911–1987), American pair skater
- Grace, Lady Manners, English noblewoman, founder of Lady Manners School in 1636
- Grace Marks (c. 1828–after c. 1873), Irish-Canadian convicted murderer, subsequently pardoned
- Grace Marra (born 1959), American musician
- Grace McCallum (born 2002), American artistic gymnast
- Grace McCarthy (1927–2017), Canadian politician
- Grace McCleen (born 1981), British writer
- Grace McDaniels (1888–1958), American freak show star
- Grace McDonald (1918–1999), American actress
- Grace McKeaney, American television writer, playwright and educator
- Grace McKenzie (1903–1988), English swimmer
- Grace Meng (born 1975), American lawyer and politician
- Grace Metalious (1924–1964), American author of Peyton Place
- Grace Mildmay (c. 1552–1620), English noblewoman, diarist and medical practitioner
- Grace Millane (1996–2018), murdered English tourist
- Grace Min (born 1994), American tennis player
- Grace Mirabella (1930–2021), American journalist
- Grace Mera Molisa (1946–2002), Vanuatuan politician, poet and campaigner for women's equality in politics
- Grace Momanyi (born 1981), Kenyan long-distance runner
- Grace Mondlana (born 2001), South Africa influencer
- Grace Moore (1898–1947), American operatic soprano and actress
- Chloë-Grace Moretz (born 1997), American actress
- Grace Morgan (1909–1996), English cricketer
- Grace Morley (1900–1985), American museologist who founded museums in San Francisco and New Delhi
- Grace Mugabe (born 1965), wife of Zimbabwe President Robert Mugabe
- Grace Mukomberanwa (born 1944), Zimbabwean sculptor
- Grace Emily Munro (1879–1964), Australian volunteer and charity worker

=== N ===
- Grace Napolitano (born 1936), American politician
- Grace Natalie (born 1982), Indonesian politician
- Grace Nichols (born 1950), Guyanese poet
- Grace Nicholson (1877–1948), American art collector and art dealer
- Grace Nikae, Japanese-born American classical pianist
- Grace Nono (born 1965), Filipino singer
- Grace Nuhfer (born 2002), American Paralympic swimmer

=== O ===
- Grace Oakeshott (1872–1929), British women's rights activist
- Grace O'Malley (c. 1530–c. 1603), Irish chieftain and pirate
- Grace Ogot (1930–2015), Kenyan author, nurse, journalist, politician and diplomat
- Grace Atkinson Oliver (1844–1899), American author, advocate of women's rights

=== P ===
- Grace Padaca (born 1963), Filipino politician
- Grace Paley (1922–2007), American short story writer, poet, teacher, and political activist
- Grace Park (actress) (born 1974), American-born Canadian actress
- Grace Park (golfer) (born 1979), South Korean professional golfer
- Grace Parra, American screenwriter, presenter, and actress
- Grace Espy Patton (1896–1904), American state superintendent of schools
- Grace Perry (1927–1987), Australian poet, editor and pediatrician
- Grace Petrie (born 1987), English folk singer-songwriter and guitarist
- Grace Phipps (born 1992), American actress
- Grace Evelyn Pickford (1902–1986), English-born American biologist and endocrinologist
- Grace Poe (born 1968), Filipino politician
- Grace Portolesi (born 1968), Australian politician
- Grace Potter (born 1983), American lead singer of rock band Grace Potter and the Nocturnals

=== R ===
- Grace Randolph (born 1987), American film reporter and critic
- Grace Rasmussen (born 1988), New Zealand netball player
- Grace Renzi (1922–2011), American artist
- Grace Rhys (1865–1929), Irish writer
- Grace S. Richmond (1866–1959), American writer
- Grace Robertson (1930–2021), Scottish photographer
- Grace Taylor Rodenbough (1897–1967), American politician
- Grace Rohrer (1924–2011), American educator, arts and women's rights activist and politician
- Grace Rolek (born 1997), American actress
- Grace Alexandra Rood (1893–1981), New Zealand school dental nurse
- Grace Roosevelt (1867–1945), American tennis player
- Grace Ross (born 1961), American environmental activist

=== S ===
- Grace Y. Sam (born 1949), Palauan politician
- Grace Sandhouse (1896–1940), American entomologist
- Grace Berg Schaible (1925–2017), American lawyer, the first female state's attorney general
- Grace Schenherr (died 1958), American politician
- Grace Schulman (born 1935), American poet and academic
- Grace Carew Sheldon (1855–1921), American journalist, author, editor, businesswoman
- Grace Sherwood (died 1740), American woman convicted of witchcraft in the U.S. state of Virginia in 1705–1706
- Grace Slick (born 1939), American rock vocalist
- Grace Cossington Smith (1892–1984), Australian artist
- Grace Snyder (1882–1982), American quilter, pioneer and centenarian
- Grace Harriet Spofford (1887–1974), American music educator
- Gracie Spinks (died 2021), English lifeguard believed to have been murdered
- Grace Stafford (1903–1992), American actress
- Grace Stanke (born 2002), American beauty pageant titleholder
- Grace Zaring Stone (1891–1991), American novelist and short story writer
- Grace Stratton (born 1999), New Zealand blogger and fashion entrepreneur

=== T ===
- Grace Tame (born 1994), Australian activist and sexual assault survivor advocate
- Grace Tanamal (born 1957), Dutch politician
- Grace Taylor (gymnast) (born 1988), American gymnast
- Grace Dyer Taylor (1859–1867), English Christian missionary in China
- Grace Paine Terzian (born 1952), American political writer and publishing executive
- Grace Thompson (1891–?), American silent film actress
- Grace Hyde Trine (1874–1972), American writer, lecturer, dramatic reader
- Grace Tsutada (born 1942), Japanese teacher and missionary
- Grace Tully (1900–1984), American presidential private secretary (to Franklin D. Roosevelt)
- Grace Turk (born 1999), American softball player
- Grace Tyson (1881–1941), American Vaudeville performer and actress

=== U ===
- Grace Upshaw (born 1975), American track and field athlete

=== V ===
- Grace Van Dien (born 1996), American actress and social media personality
- Grace VanSlooten (born 2004), American basketball player
- Grace Van Studdiford (1873–1927), American opera singer and actress
- Grace Van Patten (born 1996), American actress
- Grace Valentine (1884–1964), American actress
- Grace Vanderbilt (1870–1953), American socialite
- Grace VanderWaal (born 2004), American singer-songwriter
- Grace Vulliamy (1878–1957), English nurse, refugee and relief worker and charity activist

=== W ===
- Grace Wahba (born 1934), American statistician and academic
- Grace Wahu (c. 1907–2007), first wife of Jomo Kenyatta, the first president of Kenya
- Grace Jane Wallace (died 1878), Scottish author and translator
- Grace Wanjiru (born 1979), Kenyan race walker
- Grace Weir (born 1962), Irish sculptor and interdisciplinary artist
- Grace Wetherall (born 2006), Jersey cricketer
- Grace Miller White (1868–1957), American author
- Grace Lee Whitney (1930–2015), American actress and entertainer
- Grace Widdowson (1892–1989), New Zealand nurse and hospital matron
- Grace Olive Wiley (1883–1948), American herpetologist
- Grace Wick (1888–1958), American actress and political activist
- Grace Williams (1906–1977), Welsh composer
- Grace Wilson (1879–1957), Australian high-ranked army nurse during World War I and World War II
- Grace Wilson (soccer) (born 2005), Australian football player
- Grace Wong (born 1986), Hong Kong-born actress
- Grace Woodward (born 1978), English fashion stylist and television presenter
- Grace Wyndham Goldie (1900–1986), British pioneer television producer

=== Y ===
- Grace Chisholm Young (1868–1944), English mathematician
- Grace Young (fl. 2006–present), Canadian-born American singer, songwriter musician known as Grace
- Grace Sari Ysidora (born 1995), Indonesian professional tennis player

=== Z ===
- Grace Zabriskie (born 1941), American actress
- Grace Zumwinkle (born 1999), American ice hockey player

== Pseudonyms ==
- "Grace Greenwood", pseudonym of Sara Jane Lippincott (1823–1904), American writer
- "Grace", alias of the underaged sole survivor of the 2008 Yishun triple murders case from Singapore

== Fictional characters ==
- Grace Adler, in the television comedy series Will and Grace
- Grace Archer (1930–1955), in the BBC's long-running radio drama serial The Archers
- Grace Balin, the first DC Comics supervillainess known as Orca
- DCI Grace Barraclough, in the ITV1 soap opera Emmerdale
- Grace Cavendish, detective and the central character in the Lady Grace Mysteries
- Grace Choi, in the DC Comics universe
- Emma Grace Frost, in Marvel Comics, mainly in X-Men stories
- Grace Harlowe, the protagonist of four series of books for girls by Jessie Graham Flower
- Grace Harper, in the 2019 film Terminator: Dark Fate
- Grace Holloway, in the 1996 television movie Doctor Who
- Grace Kingston, in the Australian drama series McLeod's Daughters
- Grace Turner, in the soap opera The Young and the Restless
- Grace Van Pelt, in the TV series The Mentalist

== See also ==
- Gracie (name)
- Ti-Grace Atkinson (born 1938), American feminist author
- Grace-Ann Dinkins (born 1966), American track and field athlete
