= Burrage =

Burrage is an English surname. It is similar to Burridge. Notable people with the surname include:

- Albert Burrage (1859–1931), American industrialist and philanthropist
- A. M. Burrage (1889–1956), British writer
- Barbara Burrage (1900–1989), American printmaker
- Clare Burrage, British particle physicist
- Harold Burrage (1931–1966), American blues and soul singer, pianist, songwriter and record producer
- Henry Sweetser Burrage (1837–1926), American clergyman, editor and historian
- Jeanette Burrage (born 1952), American politician
- Jodie Burrage (born 1999), British tennis player
- Luke Burrage (born 1980), British entertainer and author
- Michael Burrage (born 1950), American judge
- Mildred Burrage (1890–1983), American artist
- Nathan Burrage (born 1971), Australian author
- Olen Burrage (1930–2013), American farmer and businessman acquitted of the murders of three civil rights workers
- Roland Burrage Dixon (1875–1934), American anthropologist
- Ronnie Burrage (born 1959), American jazz drummer
- Sean Burrage (born 1968), American politician
- Steve Burrage (1952–2025), American politician

== See also ==
- Burbridge
