= Graziella (disambiguation) =

Graziella is an 1852 novel by Alphonse de Lamartine.

Graziella may also refer to:

- Graziella (given name), a feminine given name
- Graziella (1926 film), a French film by Marcel Vandal
- Graziella (1954 film), an Italian film by Giorgio Bianchi
- Graziella (2015 film), a French film by Mehdi Charef

== See also ==
- Graciela (1915–2010), Cuban singer
- Graciela (given name)
- Graciella (disambiguation)
