= Maria Grazia =

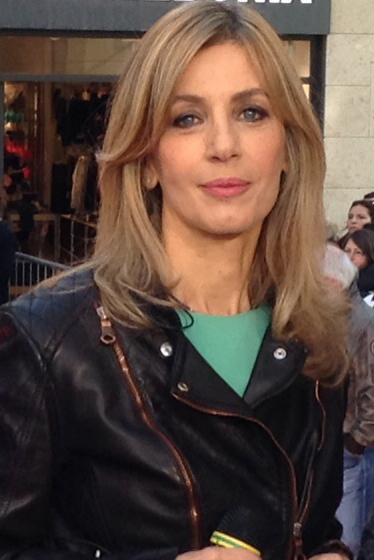
Maria Grazia Capulli

Maria Grazia is a given name. Notable people with the name include:

- Maria Grazia Alemanno (born 1990), Italian weightlifter
- Maria Grazia Buccella (born 1940), Italian actor and model
- Maria Grazia Chiuri (born 1964), Italian fashion designer
- Maria Grazia Cogoli (born 1962), Italian racewalker
- Maria Grazia Cucinotta (born 1968), Italian actor
- Maria Grazia Cutuli (1962–2001), Italian reporter
- Maria Grazia Francia (1931–2021), Italian actor
- Maria Grazia Gerwien (born 1951), Italian footballer
- Maria Grazia Giammarinaro (born 1953), Italian judge
- Maria-Grazzia Lacedelli (born 1943), Italian curler
- Maria Grazia Mancuso (1956–2014), Italian gymnast
- Maria Grazia Marchelli (1932–2006), Italian alpine skier
- Maria Grazia Orsani (born 1969), Italian racewalker
- Maria Grazia Pagano (1945–2022), Italian teacher and politician
- Maria Grazia Roberti (born 1966), Italian mountain runner and snowshoe runner
- Maria Grazia Roncarolo (born 1954), Italian pediatrician
- Maria Grazia Rosin (born 1958), Italian glass artist
- Maria Grazia Schiavo, Italian soprano
- Maria Grazia Sestero (1942–2025), Italian politician
- M. Grazia Speranza (born 1957), Italian mathematician
- Maria Grazia Spillantini (born 1957), Italian neuroscientist
- Maria Grazia Spina (born 1936), Italian actor
- Maria Grazia Tarallo (1866–1912), Italian nun

== See also ==
- Grazia (given name)
- Princess Maria di Grazia of Bourbon-Two Sicilies
