= Gracy =

Gracy is a feminine given name. It is a spelling variant of Gracie which itself is derived from Grace. Unlike Gracie, its usage is particularly limited to India.

People with the name Gracy include:

- Gracy (writer), Malayalam writer
- Gracy Goswami (born 2003), Indian actress
- Gracy Singh (born 1980), Indian actress
- Gracy Ukala (born 1946), Nigerian writer, also known as Gracy Osifo

== See also ==
- Gracie (name)
- Gracey (disambiguation)
