= Burridge (surname) =

Burridge is an English surname. It is similar to Burrage.

== List of people with the surname ==
- Alan Burridge (born 1936), English cricketer
- Bill Burridge, English actor (active 1961–1973), known for Fury from the Deep
- Brian Burridge (born 1949), English Royal Air Force commander
- Delmar Burridge, American politician
- Donella Burridge (born 1958), Australian Olympic swimmer
- Geoffrey Burridge (1948–1987), English actor
- George A. Burridge (1883–1969), Canadian teacher and politician
- Jay Burridge (born 1971), English artist and television presenter
- Jill Burridge, Canadian politician
- John Burridge (born 1951), English footballer
- Kate Burridge (contemporary), Australian linguist
- Keith Burridge (born 1950), British molecular biologist
- Kenelm Burridge (1922–2019), English anthropologist
- Lee Burridge (born 1968), English DJ
- Pam Burridge (born 1965), Australian surfer
- Peter Burridge (1933–2025), English footballer
- Randy Burridge (born 1966), Canadian ice-hockey player
- Richard Burridge (born 1951), English screenwriter
- Richard Burridge (priest) (born 1955), British theologian
- T. E. Burridge (1881–1965), British footballer

== See also ==
- Burridge, Hampshire
