= Klauke =

Klauke is a surname. Notable people with the surname include:

- Jürgen Klauke (born 1943), German artist
- Sabine Klauke (born 1973), German aerospace executive

== See also ==
- Greenlee
