= Ha the Unclear =

New Zealand indie rock band

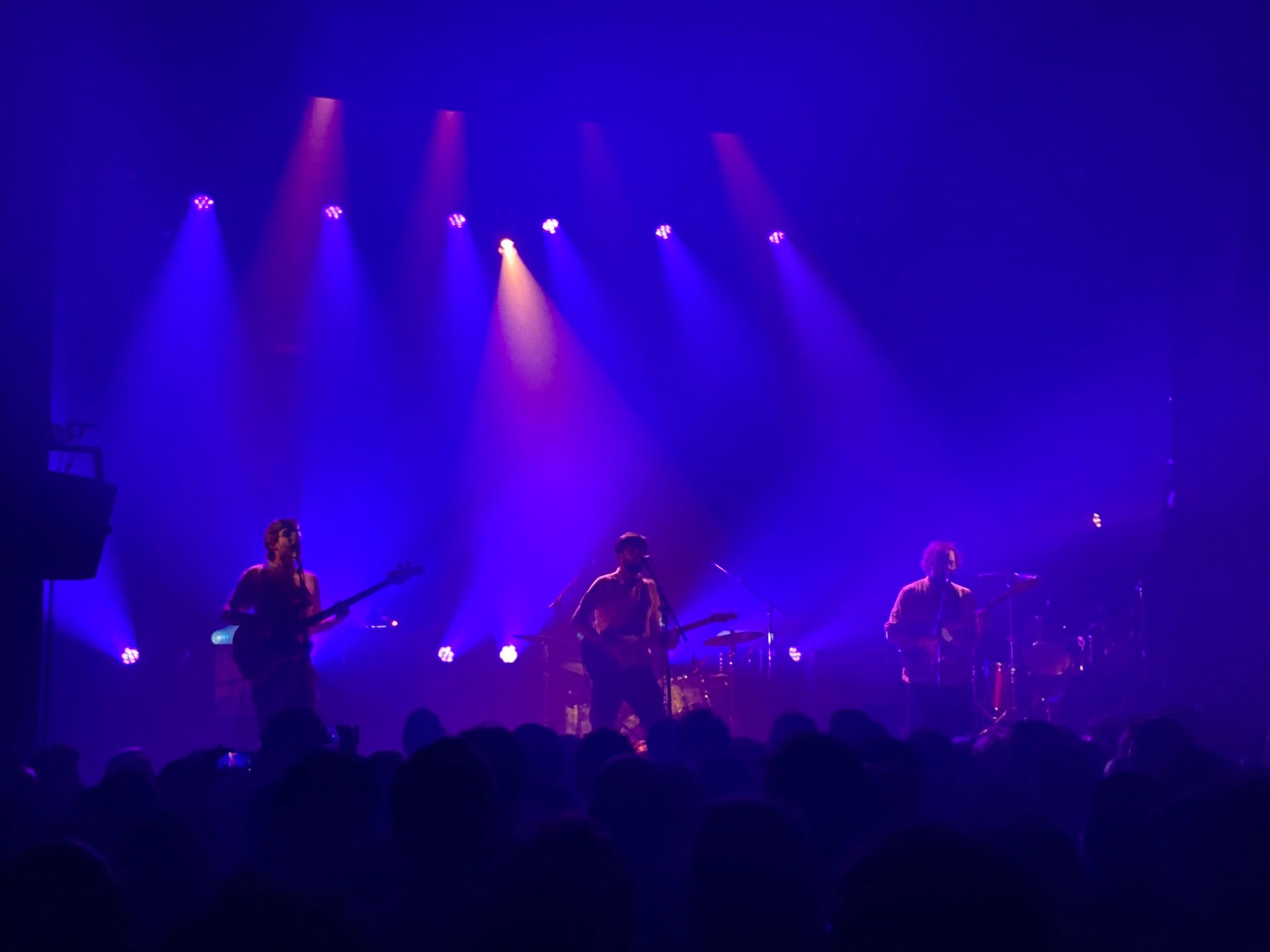

Background information
- Origin: Dunedin, New Zealand
- Genres: Indie rock, indie pop
- Years active: 2011–present
- Labels: Woollen Records, Think Zik!
- Members: Michael Cathro; Paul Cathro; Theodore Francis; Stu Harwood
- Past members: Ben Sargeant; Logan Valentine

Ha the Unclear are an indie rock band from Dunedin, New Zealand. The group is currently composed of lead vocalist/guitarist Michael Cathro, bassist Paul Cathro, guitarist Theodore Francis, and drummer Stu Harwood. Relocating from Dunedin to Auckland in 2012, the band released full-length albums Bacterium, Look at Your Motor Go (2014) and Invisible Lines (2018) before signing to French label Think Zik! in 2019 and releasing A Kingdom in a Cul-de-Sac in 2024.

== History ==
The group was formed after songwriter Michael Cathro released several DIY solo recordings under the pseudonym Baraka & the Finish Hims.

Joining with his brother, bassist Paul Cathro, and drummer Ben Sargeant, they performed and toured the songs as a trio under the name Brown, before adding guitarist Theodore Francis to the lineup in 2012 and relocating to Auckland.

=== Bacterium, Look at Your Motor Go and Invisible Lines (2014–2019) ===
The band independently released their debut album Bacterium, Look at Your Motor Go in 2014 and follow-up album Invisible Lines in 2018 on Woollen Records. Invisible Lines reached #9 on the New Zealand Albums Chart and spawned two APRA Silver Scroll Top 20 finalists: "Wallace Line" (2018) and "Where Were You When I Was All You Needed?" (2019). In 2020, the single "Strangers", from the EP Threads, spent 11 weeks on New Zealand's RadioScope Alternative Airplay Charts and topped the Student Radio Network (SRN) Top 10, ending 2021 at #6 on SRN's year-end chart for 2021.

=== French signing, EPs, and A Kingdom in a Cul-de-Sac (2019–present) ===
In 2019, Ha the Unclear signed with a French independent label Think Zik! with previous releases by Imany, Grace, Ayo and Faada Freddy. This led to the release of two EPs, Threads and Hand Print Negatives, with a full-length album A Kingdom in a Cul-de-Sac released in 2024.

The band was critically well-received in France featuring in Le Figaro, Libération, Rolling Stone, Magic RPM, and Rock & Folk Magazine, and receiving radio rotation on FIP, Europe 2, and France Inter.

In 2024, the band performed a headline show at Paris' Supersonic and supported English band Lime Garden in Paris, and French act Feldup in Nantes. The band has also performed at the MaMA Festival in Paris.

== Discography ==
=== Studio albums ===
List of studio albums, with selected chart positions
Title	Album details	Peak chart positions
Title	Album details	NZ
Bacterium, Look at Your Motor Go	Released: 2014; Label: Woollen Records; Format: Digital, CD	—
Invisible Lines	Released: 5 August 2018; Label: Woollen Records; Format: Digital, CD, vinyl	9
A Kingdom in a Cul-de-Sac	Released: 2024; Label: Think Zik!; Format: Digital, vinyl	15
"—" denotes a recording that did not chart or was not released in that territory.

=== Extended Plays ===
Title	Details
Threads	Released: 2020; Label: Think Zik!
Hand Print Negatives	Released: 2023; Label: Think Zik!

== Awards and nominations ==
Year	Award	Category	Nominee(s)	Result	Ref.
2018	APRA Silver Scroll Awards	Silver Scroll Top 20	"Wallace Line"	Nominated	
2019	APRA Silver Scroll Awards	Silver Scroll Top 20	"Where Were You When I Was All You Needed?"	Nominated	
