= Grazia (given name) =

Grazia is an Italian feminine given name. Notable people with the name include:

- Grazia Barcellona (1929–2019), Italian figure skater
- Grazia Bozzo (born 1936), Italian gymnast
- Grazia Colombo (born 1964), Italian swimmer
- Grazia Daddario (1932–2026), Italian actress
- Grazia Deledda (1871–1936), Italian writer, Nobel Prize for Literature in 1926
- Grazia Di Maggio (1994), Italian politician
- Grazia Di Michele (born 1955), Italian singer-songwriter
- Grazia Francescato (born 1946), Italian politician, journalist, and activist
- Grazia Livi (1930–2015), Italian author and journalist
- Grazia MacIntosh (born 1955), New Zealand association football goalkeeper
- Grazia Nidasio (1931–2018), Italian comic artist and illustrator
- Grazia Maria Pinto (born 1988), Italian model
- Grazia Toderi (born 1963), Italian photographer and video artist
- Grazia Varisco (born 1937), Italian visual artist and designer
- Grazia Verasani (born 1964), Italian writer and singer-songwriter
- Grazia Verzasconi (born 1962), Swiss rhythmic gymnast
- Grazia Vittadini (born 1969), Italian-German aerospace executive
- Grazia Volpi (1941–2020), Italian film producer
- Grazia Zafferani (born 1972), Sammarinese politician
- Grazia Zuffa (1945–2025), Italian politician

== See also ==
- Maria Grazia, Italian feminine given name
- Graziella (given name), Italian feminine given name
- Grace (given name), English feminine given name
