= Gracey =

Gracey may refer to:

- Gracey (surname)
- Gracey (singer)
- Gracey (novel), by James Moloney
- Gracey, Kentucky, an unincorporated town in Christian County
- Gracey, Ohio, an unincorporated community
- Gracey (Leontine) Elementary School, in Merced, California

== See also ==
- Gracie (disambiguation)
- Gracy (disambiguation)
