= Gracie =

Gracie or Gracies may refer to:

== Names ==
- Gracie (name), a given name and a family name (includes a list of people with that name)
- Gracie family, a Brazilian family known for their practice and development of Brazilian jiu-jitsu
- Hurricane Gracie, a 1959 Atlantic hurricane that affected the Bahamas and United States

== Places ==
- Gracie Mansion, official residence for the New York City mayor

== Arts, entertainment, and media ==
=== Film ===
- Gracie (film), 2007 American film directed by Davis Guggenheim
- Gracie! (2009 film), TV film on the life of the British singer Gracie Fields
- Gracie Films, U.S. television and film production company

=== Awards ===
- Gracies or Gracie Awards, presented by the Alliance for Women in Media Foundation

=== Music ===
- "Gracie", a track on the album Home Cookin' (1959) by Jimmy Smith
- "Gracie", a song on the album Rockin' with Curly Leads (1973) by rock band The Shadows
- "Gracie", a track on the album Songs for Silverman (2005) by Ben Folds

=== Fictional characters ===
- Gracie, the shopkeeper in the 2006 television series Jericho
- Gracie, a character in the CGI series Angelina Ballerina: The Next Steps
- Gracie, a fictional wolf from the animated film Night of the Zoopocalypse

== Other uses ==
- Gracie (yacht), 19th century American racing sloop yacht built in 1868

== See also ==
- Gracey (disambiguation)
- Gracy (disambiguation)
