= Grace Lee (disambiguation) =

Grace Lee is a Korean lifestyle host in the Philippines.

Grace Lee is also the name of:

- Grace Lee Boggs (1915–2015), author, anti-racist activist and feminist
- Grace Lee Whitney (1930–2015), American actress
- Grace Lee (director), Korean American director and producer
- Grace Etsuko Lee, founder of Grace Lee International
- Jin-gyu "Grace" Lee (born 2000), Korean American ice hockey player
- Grace Lee (politician), politician in New York
