= Vittadini =

Vittadini is an Italian surname. Notable people with the surname include:

- Adrienne Vittadini (born 1943), American fashion designer
- Carlo Vittadini (1800–1865), Italian doctor and mycologist
- Franco Vittadini (1884–1948), Italian composer and conductor
- Grazia Vittadini (born 1969), Italian business executive
- Rita Vittadini (1914–2000), Italian gymnast

== See also ==
- Premio Carlo Vittadini, a horse race in Italy
