= Emilie Spaulding =

American politician (1896–1988)

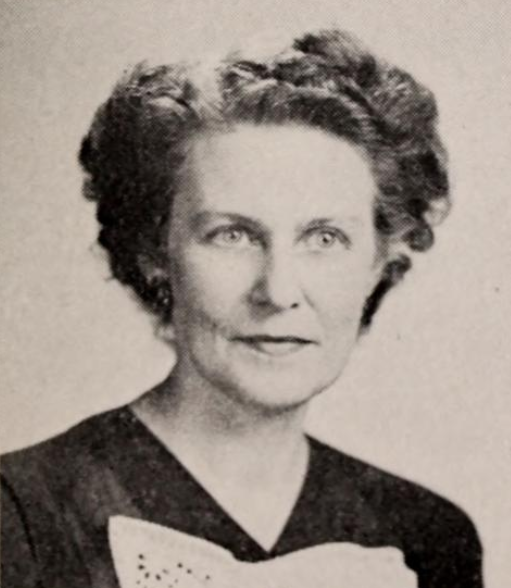
- Spaulding c. 1946

Member of the Connecticut House of Representatives from Norfolk
- In office 1945–1947 Serving with Philip Curtiss
- Preceded by: Philip Curtiss; W. Fisk Stevens
- Succeeded by: Philip Curtiss; Olive Schmeltz

Personal details
- Born: January 7, 1896 Norfolk, Connecticut, U.S.
- Died: August 29, 1988 (aged 92) Canaan, Connecticut, U.S.
- Party: Republican
- Spouse: James B. Spaulding
- Children: 2

Emilie H. Spaulding (January 7, 1896 – August 29, 1988) was an American politician who served in the Connecticut House of Representatives from 1945 to 1947, representing the town of Norfolk as a Republican.

== Personal life ==
Spaulding was born in Norfolk, Connecticut, on January 7, 1896, to Irving L. and Jessie Hamant. She attended Bradford Junior College. She was married to James B. Spaulding and had two daughters.

== Political career ==
Spaulding was elected to the Connecticut House of Representatives in 1944, and she served one term representing the town of Norfolk alongside Philip Curtiss. She was a member of the Public Health and Safety Committee and the State Parks and Reservations Committee.

Spaulding served on Norfolk's board of education.

== Death ==
Spaulding died on August 29, 1988, at her home in Canaan, Connecticut. She was 92.
