= Legitimacy of the NATO bombing of Yugoslavia =

Debate over whether the NATO intervention in Yugoslavia violated international law

The legitimacy under international law of the 1999 NATO bombing of the Federal Republic of Yugoslavia has been questioned. The UN Charter is the foundational legal document of the United Nations (UN) and is the cornerstone of the public international law governing the use of force between States. NATO members are also subject to the North Atlantic Treaty.

Supporters of the bombing argued that the bombing brought to an end the ethnic cleansing of Kosovo's Albanian population, and that it hastened (or caused) the downfall of Slobodan Milošević's government, which they saw as having been responsible for the international isolation of Yugoslavia, war crimes, and human rights violations.

Critics of the bombing have argued that the campaign violated international law. Some also argued that NATO bombing triggered or accelerated the ethnic cleansing in Kosovo as the violence escalated once the campaign began.

== Legal justifiability of launching the war ==
The laws of public international law that determine whether launching a war is legally justified are called jus ad bellum.

=== NATO's argument for the bombing's legitimacy ===
NATO described the conditions in Kosovo as posing a risk to regional stability. As such, NATO and certain governments asserted they had a legitimate interest in developments in Kosovo, due to their impact on the stability of the whole region which, they claimed, is a legitimate concern of the Organisation.

=== The UN Charter ===
The UN Charter is legally binding on all United Nations member states, including all members of NATO, because they have each signed it. Article 2(4) of the UN Charter prohibits the use of force by UN member states to resolve disputes, but with two specific exceptions to this general prohibition:

1. The first exception is set forth in Chapter VII – the UN Security Council has the power to authorize the use of force in order to fulfill its responsibility to maintain international peace and security. In particular, Article 42 states that should the Security Council consider that measures provided for in Article 41 would be inadequate or have proved to be inadequate, it may take such action by air, sea, or land forces as may be necessary to maintain or restore international peace and security. Such action may include demonstrations, blockade, and other operations by air, sea, or land forces of Members of the United Nations.
2. Article 51 contains the second specific exception to the prohibition on the use of force – the right to self-defence. In particular, Article 51 states that nothing in the present charter shall impair the inherent right of individual or collective self-defence if an armed attack occurs against a Member of the United Nations, until the Security Council has taken measures necessary to maintain international peace and security.

NATO did not have the backing of a Chapter VII UN Security Council resolution to use force in Yugoslavia. Nor did NATO claim the right of collective self defence. Therefore, it has been questioned as to whether the member states of NATO violated the UN Charter by attacking a fellow UN member state: (1) in the absence of UN Security Council authorization, and (2) in the absence of an attack or a threat of imminent attack on them.

The United Nations considers NATO to be a "regional arrangement" under UN Article 52, which allows it to deal with matters relating to the maintenance of international peace and security as are appropriate for regional action provided that such arrangements or agencies and their activities are consistent with the Purposes and Principles of the United Nations. However, the UN policy on military intervention by regional arrangements in UN Article 53 states the Security Council can, where appropriate, "utilize such regional arrangements or agencies for enforcement action under its authority. However, no enforcement action shall be taken under regional arrangements or by regional agencies without the authorization of the Security Council."

The arguments in favour of the legality of intervention are twofold. Articles 1(3), 55, and 56 of the UN charter impose the legal obligation on UN member states to respect basic human rights. Three prior Chapter VII UN Security Council resolutions had already concluded that Yugoslavia was in violation of these basic human right. However, the use of force is not explicitly authorised in either the two Security Council resolutions resolutions nor Articles 1(3), 55, and 56 of the UN charter. Thus proponents of the legality of the invasion argue that international customary law authorises the use of force. These proponents argue that when there is overwhelming humanitarian necessity, cases such as the no fly zones over Iraq in 1991, the 1827 intervention by Britain, France and Russia to protect the Greeks, India's intervention in Pakistan in 1971, Vietnamese intervention against the Khmer Rouge and the Tanzanian intervention in Uganda in 1979 show that intervention is legal.

=== NATO's charter ===
Because the NATO actions in Kosovo were taken after consultation with all members, were approved by a NATO vote, and were undertaken by several NATO members, NATO contends that its actions were in accordance with its charter. Article 4, however, is silent as to the use of force and does not discuss under what circumstances force may be authorized.

Article 5 of NATO's charter calls on NATO members to respond in mutual defense when any NATO member is attacked. It is unclear whether under the NATO charter force may be used in the absence of such an attack. Article 5 has been interpreted as restricting NATO's use of force to situations where a NATO member has been attacked. It has been argued, therefore, that NATO's actions were in violation of the charter of NATO.

=== International criticism of NATO actions ===
==== Kofi Annan ====
UN Secretary-General Kofi Annan supported intervention in principle, saying "there are times when the use of force may be legitimate in the pursuit of peace", but was critical of unilateral action by NATO. He argued "under the [UN] Charter the Security Council has primary responsibility for maintaining international peace and security - and this is explicitly acknowledged in the North Atlantic Treaty. Therefore, the Council should be involved in any decision to resort to the use of force."

==== Russian attempt to end the bombing ====
On the day the bombing started, Russia called for the UN Security Council to meet to consider "an extremely dangerous situation caused by the unilateral military action of the North Atlantic Treaty Organization (NATO) against the Federal Republic of Yugoslavia". However, a draft resolution, tabled jointly by Russia, Belarus and India, to demand "an immediate cessation of the use of force against the Federal Republic of Yugoslavia" was defeated. Among the 15 UN Security Council nations, there were three votes in favour (Russia, China and Namibia) and twelve against, with no abstentions. Argentina, Bahrain, Brazil, Gabon, Gambia, Malaysia, and Slovenia, along with the US, Britain, France, Canada, and Netherlands voted against it.

Rejection of Russia's condemnation amounted to political, but not legal, support of NATO's intervention. After the war ended with the Kumanovo Treaty and the bombing stopped, some argued that the creation on 10 June 1999 of the UN Interim Administration Mission in Kosovo (UNMIK), by Security Council Resolution 1244 (1999), constituted a legal ratification post festum (after the event).

==== Muammar Gaddafi ====
One of the few countries to support the Yugoslav government fully during the NATO bombing of Yugoslavia was that of Libya under Muammar Gaddafi. This friendship between Libya and Yugoslavia dates back to before the fall of the latter, as Gaddafi maintained a close relationship with Josip Broz Tito. At his 2009 speech to the United Nations General Assembly, Gaddafi strongly condemned the intervention in Yugoslavia, along with earlier U.S. interventions in Grenada and Panama. Libya's support for Yugoslavia throughout the 1990s led to many in Serbia supporting the Gaddafi government in during the First Libyan Civil War in 2011, with many Serbs drawing parallels between the 2011 NATO intervention in Libya and Serbia's own experience with NATO intervention.

== Humanitarian reasoning ==
The bombing campaign is sometimes referred to as a "humanitarian war" or a case of "humanitarian intervention". Part of NATO's justification for the bombing was to end the humanitarian crisis involving the large outflow of Kosovar Albanian refugees caused by Yugoslav forces. In April 1999, the development of this humanitarian crisis as well as accusations of genocide were used by policy-makers in the United States and Europe to legally justify the campaign on the basis of "humanitarian law", allowing for intervention where large scale human rights violations are occurring. Human rights organizations and individuals were divided on the campaign, given that the invocation of human rights and humanitarian law was used to initiate war. Moreover, they expressed doubts about the campaign given that it worsened the violence against Kosovar Albanians. Critics of the campaign have employed the term "humanitarian bombing" in an ironic manner to demonstrate their derision.

Some journalists have argued that the humanitarian situation worsened after the bombing campaign was launched, thereby questioning the stated objective as laid out by NATO. Writing for the Washington Post, Christopher Layne and Benjamin Schwartz opined on U.S. President Bill Clinton's claim that the campaign stopped "deliberate, systematic efforts at ..genocide" by arguing that prior to the bombing the Yugoslav Army's "brutal operations" were aimed at rooting out the Kosovo Liberation Army rather than expelling the Albanian population which only occurred afterwards, claiming that "the U.S.-led NATO bombing precipitated the very humanitarian crisis the administration claimed it was intervening to stop". Alexander Cockburn of the Los Angeles Times wrote that "an alternative assessment was that NATO’s bombing was largely to blame for the expulsions and killings" of Kosovars as prior to it the Yugoslav Army was "behaving with the brutality typical of security forces". On the 10th anniversary of the bombing campaign, Ian Bancroft wrote in The Guardian: "Though justified by apparently humanitarian considerations, NATO's bombing of Serbia succeeded only in escalating the Kosovo crisis into a full-scale humanitarian catastrophe"; citing a post-war report released by the Organization for Security and Co-operation in Europe he concluded that it is "widely acknowledged that the bulk of the ethnic cleansing and war crimes occurred after the start of [NATO]'s campaign".

== Legality of wartime conduct ==
Noam Chomsky was also highly critical of the NATO campaign and its aerial bombing in particular, where public utilities were bombed in addition to military targets. Chomsky argued that the main objective of the NATO intervention was to integrate FR Yugoslavia into the Western neo-liberal social and economic system, claiming that it was the only country in the region which still defied the Western hegemony prior to 1999; this claim is disputed. He described bombing of the Radio Television of Serbia as an act of terrorism.

== See also ==
- Independent International Commission on Kosovo
- NATO bombing of Yugoslavia#Criticism of the campaign
