= Independent International Commission on Kosovo =

The Independent International Commission on Kosovo (IICK) was a commission established in August 1999, in the aftermath of the Kosovo War, by the government of Sweden on the basis of the initiative of its Prime Minister Göran Persson. The Commission assessed that NATO bombing of Yugoslavia was "illegal but justified", in order to prevent further atrocities by Yugoslav forces, which intensified during the NATO bombing. The crisis had been caused by ongoing human-rights violations by Yugoslav forces in Kosovo during the 1990s, although when some Kosovar Albanians shifted from unarmed to armed resistance, this exacerbated the Yugoslav response which included many crimes against humanity. The commission also reported that international presence established in Kosovo did not prevent Kosovo Liberation Army (KLA) and other Albanians to ethnically cleanse Kosovo ethnic minorities.

The decision of the Prosecutor of the International Criminal Tribunal for the former Yugoslavia (ICTY) not to open an investigation against NATO was widely criticized.

== Members ==
Seven out of eleven members of the commission were from countries which are members of NATO. Richard Goldstone and Carl Tham were appointed as first co-chairmen and other members were chosen for one-year terms. The first eleven members included Anan Ashrawi, Richard A. Falk, Martha Minow, Mary Kaldor, Michael Ignatieff, Grace d'Almeida, Theo Sommer, Jacques Rupnik, Jan Urban, Akiko Domoto, and Oleg Grinevsky. One of the members, Richard A. Falk, later coauthored a work on distinction between legality and legitimacy published in 2012.

== Purpose ==
One of its purposes of the commission was to assess "the adequacy of present norms and institutions in preventing and responding" to ethnic conflict as seen in Kosovo.

== Commission's reports ==
The Commission found that:

[Yugoslav] forces were engaged in a well-planned campaign of terror and expulsion of the Kosovar Albanians. This campaign is most frequently described as one of “ethnic cleansing,” intended to drive many, if not all, Kosovar Albanians from Kosovo, destroy the foundations of their society, and prevent them from returning.

The assessment of the Commission regarding the NATO bombing of Yugoslavia was that it was "illegal but justified;" it had not been authorized by the UN Security Council, but the intervention was beneficial for the Albanian population at direct risk from the government crackdowns. The commission's finding that the NATO action was illegal may result in determining a responsibility of individuals or state. The decision of the Prosecutor of the International Criminal Tribunal for the former Yugoslavia (ICTY) not to open an investigation against NATO regarding individual responsibility was heavily criticized, as well as the humanitarian interventionism.

The commission criticized NATO's Kosovo Force (KFOR) and the United Nations Interim Administration Mission in Kosovo (UNMIK) for failing to protect minorities in Kosovo and allowing "reverse ethnic cleansing". The commission stated that KFOR was reluctant to and did not have the capability to prevent violence against ethnic minorities and that the Kosovo Liberation Army (KLA) and other Albanians ethnically cleansed Kosovo after the international presence was established in Kosovo.

== See also ==
- Humanitarian intervention
- Legitimacy of the NATO bombing of Yugoslavia
