= Burbridge =

Burbridge is an Anglo-Saxon surname. Notable people with the surname include:

- Aaron Burbridge (b. 1993), American football player
- Betty Burbridge (1895–1987), American screenwriter and actress
- Branse Burbridge (1921–2016), World War II RAF Pilot
- Cynthia Carmen Burbridge (born 1979), Thai model, actress and author
- Grace Burbridge (1887–?), British suffragette, burned whilst setting fire to a postbox
- Kenneth Joseph Burbridge, Canadian diplomat
- Kofi Burbridge (1961–2019), American musician
- Lyle J. Burbridge (1922–2006), American sound engineer
- Martin Burbridge, first Chief Scout of Scouting Ireland
- Nick Burbridge (b. 1954), British author
- Oteil Burbridge (born 1967), American bass guitarist
- Paul Burbridge (1932–2021), Anglican clergyman
- Stephen Gano Burbridge (1831–1894), American general
