= Maria Grazia Roncarolo =

Italian pediatrician

- Born: 1954 (age 71–72); Turin, Italy
- Education: University of Turin
- Scientific career
- Workplaces: Stanford University

Maria Grazia Roncarolo (born 17 December 1954) is an Italian pediatrician who is currently George D. Smith Professor in Stem Cell and Regenerative Medicine and Professor of Medicine (Blood and Marrow Transplantation and Cellular Therapy) at Stanford University. She is also the Director of the Stanford Institute of Stem Cell Biology and Regenerative Medicine along with Irving Weissman and Michael Longaker and the Director for Center for Definitive and Curative Medicine at Stanford.

She was educated at the University of Turin. She is a past President of the Federation of Clinical Immunology Societies, and is a member of the Austrian Academy of Sciences. She is an academic founder of Graphite Bio. She has an h-index of 91.

== Awards and honors ==
- Nominated “Ufficiale dell’Ordine Al Merito della Repubblica Italiana” by the President of Italy for outstanding scientific contributions (2000)
- Elected Member of the Academia Europaea of Sciences (2005)
- Outstanding Achievement Award from the European Society of Gene and Cell Therapy (2010)
- Elected Member of the Austrian Academy of Sciences (2012)
- Eurordis Scientific Award (2012)
- “Gold Apple” prize, awarded by the Marisa Bellisario Foundation, for outstanding contribution to science (2013)
- Knighthood “Commendatore dell’Ordine Al Merito della Repubblica Italiana” from the President of Italy for outstanding scientific contributions (2014)
- Outstanding Achievement Award” from the American Society of Gene and Cell Therapy (2017)

== Research career ==
Roncarolo is well known for identifying a peripheral subset of regulatory T cells, called type 1 regulatory T (Tr1) cells. Her team was the first to describe Tr1 cells while at DNAX Research Institute of Molecular and Cellular Biology, which was later acquired by Schering-Plough and now a part of Merck. She was the principal investigator of the first clinical trial using Tr1 cells that are generated ex vivo to treat graft-versus-host disease in leukemia patients receiving a haploidentical haematopoietic stem cell transplant and is the principal investigator of an additional clinical trial utilizing these cells in the United States.

Roncarolo has made major contributions in the field of cell and gene therapy. She performed fetal stem cell transplants given before birth to treat inherited diseases of the immune system such as Wiskott-Aldrich Syndrome She led the first stem cell-based gene therapy trial for patients with adenosine deaminase-severe combined immunodeficiency. The clinical trial results led to the European Commission approval. The therapy was licensed to GlaxoSmithKline and is marketed under the name Strimvelis, making it the first commercially approved ex vivo gene therapy in Europe.
