= Graciela (given name) =

- Gender: Female

Origin
- Origin: Spanish

Other names
- Related names: Grace

Graciela may refer to

== People ==
- Graciela (Grillo-Pérez) (1915–2010), Cuban singer
- Graciela Aranis (1908–1996), Chilean painter, cartoonist
- Graciela Araya (born 1962), Chilean-Austrian mezzo-soprano
- Graciela Beltrán (born 1974), Mexican singer and actress
- Graciela Borges (born 1941), Argentine actress
- Graciela Rodo Boulanger (born 1935), Bolivian painter
- Graciella Carvalho (born 1985), Brazilian beauty contest contestant and model
- Graciela Casillas-Boggs (born 1957), American boxer and kickboxer
- Graciela Chichilnisky (born 1944), Argentine-American mathematical economist
- Graciela Daniele (born 1939), Argentine-American dancer
- Graciela Dixon, Panamanian jurist
- Graciela Fernández Meijide (born 1931), Argentine politician and human rights activist
- Graciela Garcia Irlando, American politician
- Graciela Guzmán, American politician
- Graciela Iturbide (born 1942), Mexican photographer
- Graciela Limón (born 1938), Mexican novelist
- Graciela Márquez (born 1978), Venezuelan volleyball player
- Graciela Mendoza (María Graciela Mendoza Barrios) (born 1963), Mexican racewalker
- Graciela Metternicht, Belgian-Australian geomorphologist
- Graciela Naranjo (1916–2001), Venezuelan singer and actress
- Graciela Palau de Nemes (1919–2019), Spanish-American literary critic
- Graciela Ocaña (born 1960), Argentine politician
- Graciela Olivarez (1928–1987), American lawyer and civil rights activist
- Graciela Rivera (1921–2011), Puerto Rican soprano
- Graciela Sanchez (born 1960), American social justice activist
- Graciela Sapriza (born 1945), Uruguayan historian, educator
- Graziella Schazad (born 1983), German singer and songwriter
- Graciela Stefani (born 1960), Argentine actress
- Graciela Yataco (born c. 1987), Peruvian model

== Fictional Characters ==
- Graciela "Grachi" Alonso, the protagonist of the Nickelodeon Latin American series, Grachi

== See also ==
- Graciella (disambiguation)
- Grace (given name)
