= Olive Schmeltz =

American politician (died 1969)

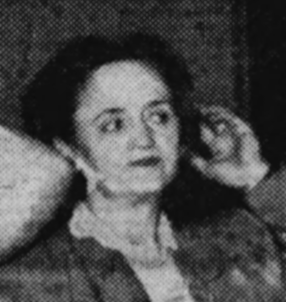
- Schmeltz in 1950

Member of the Connecticut House of Representatives from Norfolk
- In office 1947–1957
- Preceded by: Emilie Spaulding; Philip Curtiss
- Succeeded by: Joseph Zanobi; Herbert F. Robertson Jr.

Personal details
- Born: 1898 or 1899 Hartford, Connecticut, U.S.
- Died: April 6, 1969 (aged 70) Winchester, Connecticut, U.S.
- Party: Republican
- Spouse: Louis Schmeltz
- Children: 1

Olive E. Schmeltz (died April 6, 1969) was an American politician who served in the Connecticut House of Representatives from 1947 to 1957, representing the town of Norfolk as a Republican. She worked as the registrar of voters in Norfolk for thirty years and was vice chairwoman of the Republican Town Committee.
