= Alexander Stavenitz =

American visual artist (1901–1960)

Alexander Raoul Stavenitz
- Born: 31 May 1901; Kiev, Russian Empire (now Ukraine)
- Died: 11 February 1960; Norwalk, Connecticut, U.S.
- Other names: Alex Raoul Stavenitz, A. R. Stavenitz
- Education: Washington University in St. Louis, Art Institute of Chicago, Art Students League of New York
- Occupation(s): Visual artist, educator, industrial designer, architectural designer
- Spouse: Barbara Burrage (m. ? – 1960; death)

Alexander Raoul Stavenitz (31 May 1901 – 11 February 1960) was a Russian Empire-born American visual artist and educator. He was known for his paintings, and printmaking. He also worked as an industrial designer and architectural designer in his early career.

== Early life and education ==
Alexander Raoul Stavenitz was born on 31 May 1901, in Kiev, Russian Empire (now Ukraine). He attended Central High School (now Central Visual and Performing Arts High School) in St. Louis, Missouri, U.S..

Stavenitz received a B.Arch. degree in 1925 from the Washington University in St. Louis. In 1927, he studied at the Art Institute of Chicago; followed by study at the Art Students League of New York from 1928 until 1931.

== Career ==
Stavenitz moved to New York City around 1925, and began working as architectural and industrial designer. During this time period he is associated with George Cooper Rudolph. In 1931, Stavenitz was awarded a Guggenheim Fellowship. He was a member of the American Artists’ Congress, a Marxist organization for writers and artists in New York City.

He taught at Pratt Institute between 1945 and 1947. In 1949, Stavenitz was appointed associate professor of art at City College of New York. He also worked as an art instructor at MoMA’s People’s Art Center.

He died at his home in Norwalk, Connecticut on 11 February 1960. Stavenitz's work is in museum collections, including the Smithsonian American Art Museum, National Gallery of Art, Philadelphia Museum of Art, Whitney Museum of American Art, Davison Art Center, and Yale University Art Gallery.

== Exhibitions ==
- 1930, "Living American Etchers", National Arts Club, New York City, New York
- 1930, Brooklyn Society of Etchers, Brooklyn, New York City, New York
- 1930, Chicago Society of Etchers, Chicago, Illinois
- 1930, Philadelphia Society of Etchers, Philadelphia, Pennsylvania
- 1931, Brooklyn Society of Etchers, Brooklyn, New York City, New York
- 1931, Chicago Society of Etchers, Chicago, Illinois
- 1931, Philadelphia Society of Etchers, Philadelphia, Pennsylvania
- 1931, International Print Exhibition, Pasadena, California
- 1931, International Print Exhibition, Cleveland, Ohio
- 1931, Whitney Museum of American Art, New York City, New York
- 1931, "Fifty Prints of the Year", American Institute of Graphic Arts, New York City, New York
- 1941, "Twenty Lithographs: Graphic Art Processes", Museum of Modern Art (MoMA), New York City, New York
