= Grazia Vittadini =

Italian business executive (born 1969)

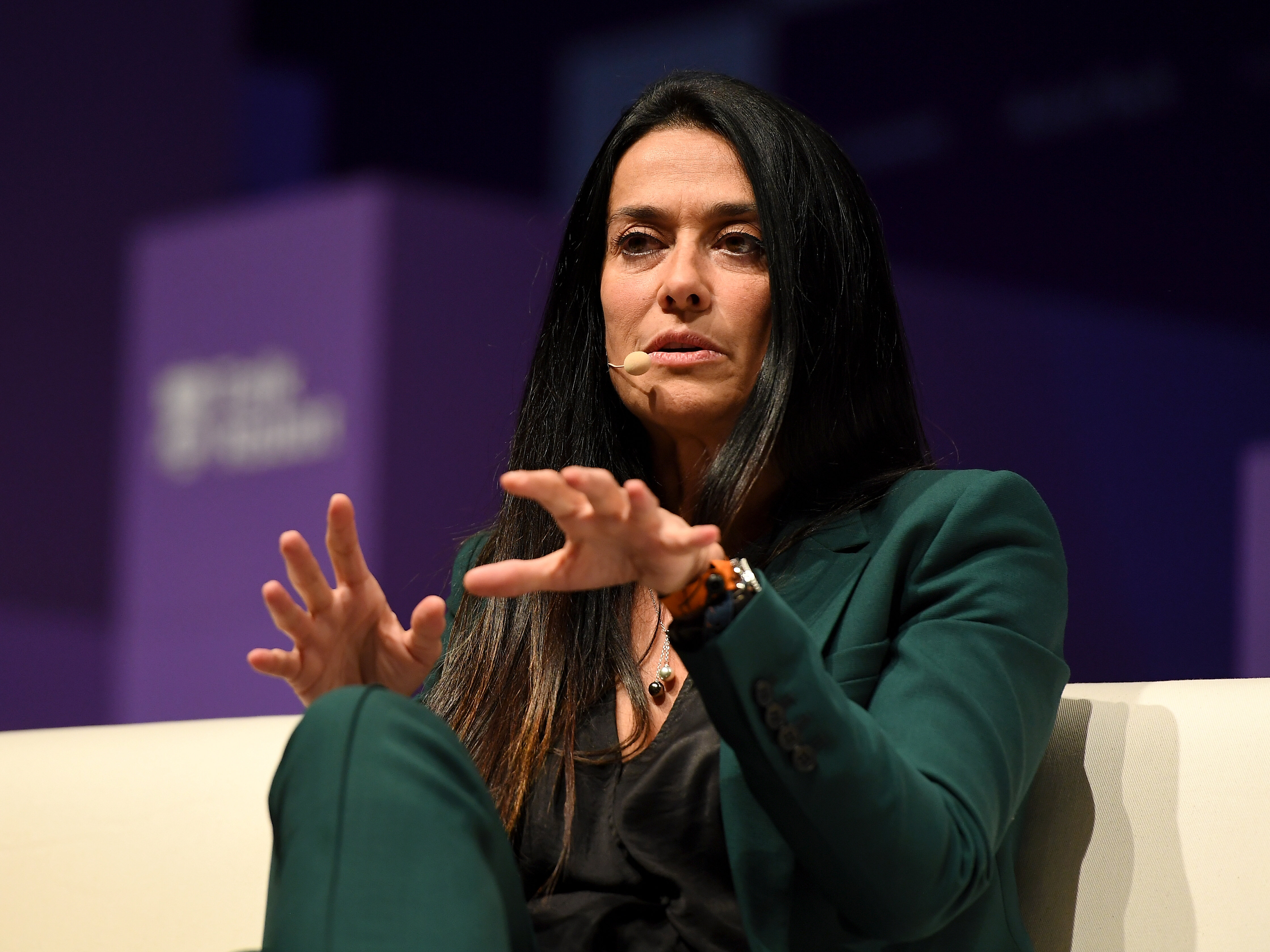
- Grazia Vittadini (2018)
- Born: 1969 (age 56–57); Milan, Italy
- Education: Polytechnic University of Milan
- Occupation: Chief technology officer
- Employer: Lufthansa Group

Grazia Vittadini FRAeS,FREng (born 1969 in Milan) is an Italian-German aerospace executive. From May 2018 to 2021 she was Chief Technology Officer (CTO) of the aerospace and defence company Airbus. Since November 2021 Vittadini has served as the Chief Technology Officer (CTO) of the aircraft engine and power systems company Rolls-Royce Holdings.

== Early life and education ==
Growing up in Italy and the United States, Vittadini took an early interest in aviation and motorcycling. She studied aeronautical engineering with a focus on aerodynamics at the Polytechnic University of Milan and holds a private pilot's license.

== Career ==
Vittadini began her professional career working for the Italian industrial partner within the Eurofighter consortium. In 2002, she joined Airbus Operations in Germany, where she occupied several senior management positions, amongst others Chief Engineer on the Wing High Lift Devices of the A380. As head of Major Structural Tests, she was also instrumental in securing the A350 XWB's First Flight and Type Certification. Other positions held by Vittadini include head of Airframe Design and Technical Authority for all Airbus aircraft and head of Corporate Audit & Forensic. More recently, she was head of Engineering within the Airbus Defence and Space management board, reporting to Division CEO Dirk Hoke.

In May 2018 Vittadini was appointed Chief Technology Officer (CTO) of Airbus and a member of the Airbus Executive Committee with responsibility for the technical development and coordination of the entire group. In this role she has focused in particular on developing new technologies and solutions to succeed fossil driven propulsion technologies and to enable environmentally friendly flight (e.g. hybrid and electronic engines). To address the growing complexity of aerospace technologies, Vittadini supports the use of artificial intelligence (AI) and quantum computing.

She left Airbus in 2021 after 19 years with the company, with Sabine Klauke replacing her as CTO. In November 2021, Grazia Vittadini joined Rolls-Royce as Chief Technology Officer (CTO) replacing Paul Stein. In her current role, her focus lies on further developing the current product portfolio while decarbonizing the aerospace sector and driving sustainable aviation. Rolls-Royce notably explores the possibilities for further efficiency gains in current and future generations of gas turbine technologies, and in the longer term, hydrogen and electrical propulsion. Its other business units (Power Systems, Defence, Rolls-Royce Electrical and Rolls-Royce Small Modular Reactors (SMR)) are also part of the company’s energy transition strategy.

Amongst her additional roles, Vittadini served as director of the Airbus Foundation Board and as a member of the Inclusion and Diversity Steering Committee. She was also awarded the French "Légion d'honneur" (Legion of Honour) in 2017 and the "Woman of the Year in Business" award in 2018 by the French trade magazine L'Usine Nouvelle. Vittadini is also Member of the Supervisory Board of Siemens AG and the Franco-German New Space start-up The Exploration Company. In addition, she is a member of the Senate of the Fraunhofer-Gesellschaft and serves as advisor to the German Centre for Mobility of the Future (German: Deutsches Zentrum Mobilität der Zukunft; DZM) and the Department of Aerospace Science and Technology of Politecnico di Milano (DAER). Grazia Vittadini also holds a Doctor h.c. in Engineering and Technology from Cranfield University, UK, and is a Fellow of the Royal Aeronautical Society and the Royal Academy of Engineering.

== Lufthansa Group ==
In July 2024, Vittadini joined the Executive Board of Lufthansa Group with effect from 1 July 2024, as Chief Technology Officer (CTO) of the Group. In this capacity, she is responsible for the Technology, IT & Innovation division, as well as sustainability and fleet/technology strategy.

Earlier media coverage stated: "Diese Managerin soll Lufthansa grüner machen" (“This manager is to make Lufthansa greener”), emphasising her role in transforming the group’s technology and sustainability agenda.
