= Mildred Burrage =

American artist

Mildred Giddings Burrage (May 18, 1890 – March 26, 1983) was an American artist.

A native of Portland, Maine, Burrage was the daughter of Henry S. Burrage and Ernestine Maie Giddings, his second wife. In childhood her mother supported her artistic endeavors, and at the age of twelve she began lessons with Alice H. Howes, a former pupil of Frank Weston Benson and William Merritt Chase. She graduated from Smith Grammar School and Cony High School before attending Mary Colman Wheeler's school in Providence, Rhode Island, where she was especially interest in the classes on art. She studied at the Académie de la Grande Chaumière in Paris, and had lessons as well with Richard E. Miller and Eben F. Comins. She received a prize from the International Art Union in 1912.

During her early career Burrage traveled extensively in Europe, and also visited the Armory Show. She returned to the United States at the outbreak of World War I, moving to Kennebunkport with her sister Madeline, known as "Bob", in 1917, and remaining there until 1947, when they moved to Wiscasset. Her style continued to develop during this time, shifting from the Impressionism of her youth to an abstraction informed by the work of Jackson Pollock; later in life she created collages from mica. Some of her work is influenced by cartography. Active as a preservationist as well as an artist, she served as a director of the National Trust for Historic Preservation, and in 1954 helped to found the Lincoln County Historical Association. She was also involved in the founding of the Maine Art Gallery. Upon her death Burrage was buried with Madeline, who predeceased her, at Evergreen Cemetery in Portland.

Burrage exhibited widely across the United States during her career, both alone and in group exhibitions, and her work is in the collection of the Smithsonian Institution. Her papers are held in the Maine Women Writers Collection of the University of New England. Among her accolades was the Deborah Morton Award from Westbrook College.
