= Grace Wick =

American dancer and political activist (1888–1958)

Personal details
- Born: March 7, 1888 Harlan, Iowa, U.S.
- Died: 1958 Portland, Oregon, U.S.
- Party: Independent
- Occupation: Actress, radio producer, political activist

Grace Wick (March 7, 1888 – 1958) was an American actress, radio producer, and right-wing political activist based in Portland, Oregon. Initially a supporter of Franklin D. Roosevelt and the New Deal, she became known for her theatrical political protests and later emerged as a vocal critic of Roosevelt’s policies.

== Early life ==
Wick was born in Harlan, Iowa, in 1888. She pursued a career in acting and lived for a time on the East Coast. In 1922, she moved to Jackson County, Oregon with her husband George Merritt and supported Democrat Walter M. Pierce’s successful gubernatorial campaign.

After divorcing Merritt in 1924, she attempted to start a film career in Hollywood, which did not materialize. She settled in Portland in 1927 and worked as an actress and radio producer.

== Political activism ==
Wick initially supported Franklin D. Roosevelt and campaigned for him in the 1932 presidential election. However, she later turned against the New Deal, claiming it had failed to assist women and the unemployed.

In 1934, she ran as an Independent candidate for Oregon’s 3rd congressional district but was defeated by Nan Wood Honeyman, Oregon’s first woman elected to Congress.

In May 1935, she gained national attention by parading down Broadway in Portland wearing a barrel covered with slogans like “One of the Forgotten Women of the New Deal,” in protest of unemployment.

In 1936, she announced her candidacy for Mayor of Portland, Oregon, promising "a kiss for everyone in Portland," but soon withdrew from the race.

In the late 1930s and 1940s, Wick’s politics shifted further right. She joined organizations such as the National Gentile League and the American Woman’s Party, and her speeches became increasingly anti-Semitic and isolationist. She opposed U.S. involvement in World War II and blamed Jews, Communists, and immigrants for national and global problems.

== Death ==
Wick died in Portland in 1958, leaving a dog and four cats.
