= Gracy Ukala =

Nigerian writer and educator

- Born: 19 April 1946 (age 80)
- Education: University of Ibadan, University of Benin (Nigeria), University of Lagos
- Occupations: Nigerian writer and educator
- Parent(s): Godwin and Beatrice Ukala

Gracy Ukala (born 19 April 1946) is a Nigerian writer and educator.

== Biography ==
Gracy Ukala was born in Mbiri on 19 April 1946. She is the daughter of Godwin and Beatrice Ukala. She obtained a BA from the University of Ibadan, a MEd from the University of Benin and a MPh from the University of Lagos She was the foundation Principal of Emotan College, Benin City (1980 to 1990), where she achieved the status of Outstanding Principal, 1986. She was also Head of the English department at Geoffrey Chaucer School in London from 1990 to 1995, Head of the Communications faculty at the Eastlea Community School in London from 1996 to 2000, and manager of the learning support unit at the Bow Boys School in London from 2000 to 2002.

She is the author of the novel Dizzy Angel, which won a literary award in 1985 for an excellent tackling of the traditional issues in Nigeria such as superstitions and the harsh conditions that face female children. Ukala's other works include The Broken Bond (UPL, 2001) and Ada in London, Surviving the Traumas (Outskirts Press, 2005).

From 1999 to 2001, she was president and founder of Ethnic Minority Education and Cultural Enrichment Services. In 2002, she became managing director at Goldsparkle Consulting Services. Ukala also contributed articles, short stories and poetry to various publications, including the Nigerian Observer.

Between 1974 and 1984, she wrote a number of scripts for broadcasts by the Nigerian Television Authority.

Ukala married Edward Osifo; the couple later divorced.

Ukala currently lives in the United Kingdom where she taught till she retired.

== Selected works ==
- Dramas of Love and Marriage (1978) as Gracy Osifo
- Dizzy Angel, novel (1985) as Gracy Osifo, was awarded the Nigerian Literary Merit Award by the Institute of Continuing Education in Benin City
- The Broken Bond, novel (2001)
- Ada in London, autobiographical novel (2005)
