= Gracey (surname) =

Gracey is a surname of Scottish origin derived from the occupation of shoemaker. Notable people with the surname include:

- Annie Ryder Gracey (1836–1908), American writer, missionary
- Chad Gracey (born 1971), American musician
- Clarence Gracey, American football player
- Douglas Gracey (1894–1964), British Indian Army officer
- James S. Gracey (1927–2020), American Coast Guard Commandant
- Yale Gracey (1910–1983), Disney imagineer
