= Grace Gassette =

American artist and sculptor

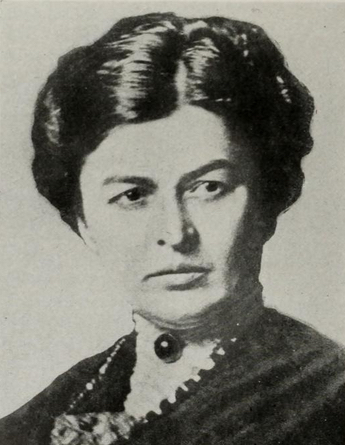
- Grace Gassette, from a 1917 publication.
- Born: March 28, 1871; Chicago, Illinois, US
- Died: 1955 (aged 83–84); Woodstock, Vermont, US
- Occupation: artist
- Known for: designing apparatus for the healing for wounded soldiers in World War I

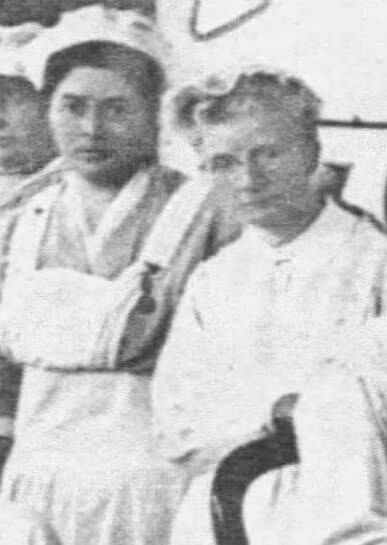
Gassette (left) and her stepmother serving as nurses in 1915, during World War I

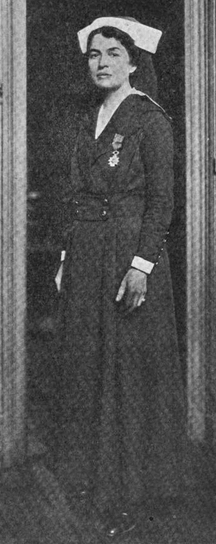
Grace Gassette wearing a medal, from a 1918 publication.

Grace Gassette (March 28, 1871 — 1955) was an American artist and sculptor, decorated for her contributions to developing orthopedic devices for the treatment of war injuries, during World War I.

== Early life ==
Grace Gassette was born in Chicago, Illinois, the daughter of Norman Theodore Gassette and Martha Graves Gassette. Her father was a businessman and veteran of the American Civil War. After her mother's death, she was raised by her stepmother, Amelia Boggs Gassette.

As a young woman, Gassette was a founding member of the Woman's Athletic Club in Chicago. She studied with Mary Cassatt and was an art student in Paris, part of the social circle of American expatriates that included Gertrude Stein and Alice Woods Ullman.

== Life as an artist ==
As a young woman, Gassette practised as an artist, and in 1898 she exhibited a portrait of her stepmother in the Champs Elysées salon in Paris. By the following year, she had relocated to the French capital, and her entry to the 1899 Salon, a miniature portrait of a Miss Morris, records her residing in the rue Boissonade in Montparnasse, and notes that she was studying with the academic painter Raphaël Collin. A few years later, around 1906, she made the acquaintance of her fellow expatriate painter Mary Cassatt, who became a significant mentor—Gassette penned an article about Cassatt for the Chicago Post, and would later list as her teacher in the catalogues of exhibitions she entered.

Throughout the first decade of the 1900s and up until the outbreak of World War I, Gassette travelled back and forth between Paris and America, exhibiting her works in both her native and adoptive countries. She entered works into the Paris salons of 1903, 1909, and 1910, and her paintings were presented in America at the Eighteenth Annual Fine Art Exhibition in Chicago in 1905 and the Carnegie Institute’s Annual International Exhibitions in Pittsburgh in 1905 and 1907, among others. In 1910, her portrait Helen from the collection of Mr. Granger Farwell was exhibited in a loan exhibition at the Art Institute of Chicago. An article in the New York Times in 1910 notes that following an exhibition of nine of her paintings at the Women’s Lyceum Club in Paris, she planned to return to America to undertake no fewer than sixteen portrait commissions, mentioning that her works 'show a certain virile quality and a degree of strength and firmness that are quite distinctive.' Indeed, although she also produced domestic genre paintings, portraiture seems to have been at the centre of her artistic practice—at an exhibition at Rouillier’s in Paris in 1912, she presented over a dozen likenesses of both male and female sitters, French and American alike. In Paris, Gassette and her stepmother were part of the lively and largely female social circle of American expatriates around Gertrude Stein, which also included the writer Alice Woods Ullman and Emily Dawson, a cousin of Mary Berenson.

== Career ==
With the outbreak of World War I, Gassette’s life changed dramatically as she plunged her considerable energy into the war effort. She was in charge of surgical supplies for the American Ambulance Hospital in Neuilly-sur-Seine when the war began. In 1916 Gassette was made technical director of the Franco-American Corrective Surgical Appliance Committee, a committee working on traction systems and other orthopedic supports for war-injured soldiers. She used her fluent knowledge of French and of anatomy to work with surgeons and nurses, to design such devices as the Gassette Suspensory Hammock, a low-cost wooden device meant to preserve more comfort, symmetry and function for the healing body. She published about her work in medical journals.

Gassette was credited with making custom devices that helped hundreds of soldiers avoid or lessen amputation, deformity, and impairment after a limb injury. "I can tell you what I have done and tell you about my men," she wrote from France. "I love them and they are fine, every one of them. I guess that it is because I love them that I find a way to help them." "She has, by careful study, found means to relieve the suffering and to expedite the cure of men who have had arms or legs broken or shattered," explained one report in 1918. Her story was retold often in American periodicals, included one account by editor Alice Stone Blackwell linking her work to women's suffrage: "As this young woman is a citizen of Illinois, when she comes home she will have the right to vote. And it will be strange indeed if any of the many right hands she has restored should ever cast a ballot against equal suffrage."

The French government awarded her the Cross of the Legion of Honour for her services, one of the first two American women so honored, alongside novelist Edith Wharton.

== Later life ==
Gassette lived in Bazainville after the war. She taught classes, and wrote two books in French on health topics, La Clé (1938, with Georges Barbarin), and La Santé (1950). She was consulted to treat Franklin D. Roosevelt when he was in declining health in 1944, but she offered only a packet of medicinal salts. She died in Woodstock, Vermont in 1955, aged 84 years.
