= Grace Y. Sam =

Palauan politician (born 1949)

Member of Koror State Legislature
- In office 1983–?

Personal details
- Born: November 2, 1949 (age 76)
- Education: University of Hawaiʻi
- Occupation: Attorney

Grace Y. Sam is a Palauan politician who served as a member of the Koror State Legislature.

Sam was born on November 2, 1949, to a Protestant family. She was educated in the Philippines and Palau, where she graduated from the Bethania Girls High School and then taught there for one year. She received legal training at the district attorney's office for the Trust Territory of the Pacific Islands in Palau and Saipan, Northern Mariana Islands, and attended the University of Hawaiʻi. In 1978, she became an assistant district attorney.

In 1981, Sam worked for the Palau Constitutional Convention as a staff translator. She was elected as a delegate to the Koror State Constitutional Convention in 1983, and then to the Koror State Legislature that same year. The Palauan president Haruo Remeliik appointed her to the National Reapportionment Commission in 1984. She also served as an assistant clerk of court for the Supreme Court of Palau and the Court of Common Pleas.
