= Graciella =

Graciella may refer to:

- Graciela (given name)
- Graciela (1915–2010), Cuban singer
- Graciella (beetle), genus of longhorn beetle

== See also ==
- Graziella, an 1852 French novel
