= Grace Harriet Spofford =

American music educator

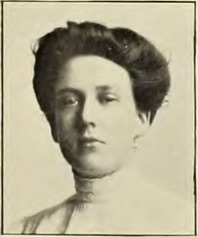
- Born: September 21, 1887; Haverhill
- Died: June 5, 1974 (aged 86); New York City
- Alma mater: Mount Holyoke College; Smith College; Peabody Institute
- Occupation: Educator, music teacher, academic administrator
- Employer: Curtis Institute of Music; Heidelberg University; Henry Street Settlement; Peabody Institute

Grace Harriet Spofford (September 21, 1887 – June 5, 1974) was an American music educator. She was director of the music school of the Henry Street Settlement from 1935 to 1954.

== Early life ==
Grace Harriet Spofford was born on September 21, 1887 in Haverhill, Massachusetts, the only child of Harry Hall Spofford and Sarah G. Hastings. Her interest in music came early, playing with a piano at age three. By age seven she was taking music lessons, and her childhood music education was guided by her sister, contralto Harriet M. Newman.

In 1905, Spofford graduated from Haverhill High School. She initially attended Mount Holyoke College, studying piano under William Churchill Hammond. Due to the lack of college credit for music study and the domestic work required of students, Spofford transferred from Mount Holyoke to Smith College, where she studied with Edwin Bruce Story and Henry Dike Sleeper. After graduating in 1909, she studied with Richard B. Platt in Boston for a year, then taught piano at Heidelberg University in Tiffin, Ohio, from 1910 to 1912, giving public recitals in both places.

== Career ==
=== Peabody Conservatory and Curtis Institute ===
She spent the next twelve years in Baltimore at the Peabody Conservatory of Music. She earned teacher's certificates in piano (1913) and organ (1916). She taught piano for several years and served as executive secretary of the Peabody from 1917 to 1924. Spofford also wrote music criticism for the Baltimore Evening Sun. She later wrote that her performing career was cut short by a ganglion cyst she attributed to over practicing, but "I was rather 'bossy' anyway, and loved administrative work."

In 1924, she became the dean of the newly opened Curtis Institute of Music in Philadelphia, where she established the curriculum and started an international scholarship program. In September 1928, she would tell Musical America that women's position as performers, players, and singers is "now unquestioned," arguing that women have always been a "great, active, moving, vitalizing force in music," and note representation of women in the Curtis Institute faculty.

Spofford was forced to resign in 1931 after a conflict with director Josef Hofmann. Henry Bellamann would replace her as dean. Following this, Spofford entered the field of "radio education," with the Peabody Bulletin saying she would "devote her efforts to that study of that work."

=== Later career ===
Spofford moved to New York City and held a variety of jobs, including running a radio and music counselling service in the Steinway Building, serving as executive secretary of Olga Samaroff’s Layman's Music Courses, and managing the Curtis String Quartet and other acts. She was a music lecturer at the Katharine Gibbs School from 1936 to 1959 and associate director of the New York College of Music from 1934 to 1938. She later received an honorary doctorate of music from the New York School of Music in 1952.

Spofford's most notable job was as director of the music school of the Henry Street Settlement. In 1935, she replaced ousted founding director Hedi Katz. The school provided access to music education for the underprivileged, including future music professionals as well as students moving on to non-musical careers. The teaching staff included leading musicians and teachers from Juilliard School and the Curtis Institute. A highlight of her tenure there was a two-act opera she commissioned from composer Aaron Copland for Henry Street students. The Second Hurricane premiered at the school in 1937. The libretto was by Edwin Denby and it was conducted by Lehman Engel and staged by Orson Welles. She was honored after 17 years as director of the Henry Street Settlement in a town hall event.

== Retirement and later life ==
Spofford retired in 1954. In her retirement, she represented the United States and over 20 international conferences, including the conference which created the International Society for Music Education. She chaired the music committees of the International Council of Women (1954–1963) and the National Council of Women of the United States (1953–1964), and was a delegate to the UNESCO International Music Council. She would also serve on the Board of Counselors for Smith College.

She died of a heart attack on June 5, 1974, in a New York City nursing home.

== Personal life ==
Spofford developed a lifelong personal friendship with Peabody colleague Elizabeth Coulson, who was fifteen years older than her. They lived together at Tudor Arms Apartments near Wyman Park. In 1920, both would begin leasing a townhouse, at 609 Cathedral Street in Baltimore, in an area near the present-day Walters Art Museum. Coulson and Spofford both co-authored a book in 1916 entitled A Guide for Beginners in Piano Playing.

In September 1924, Spofford left Coulson behind when she accepted an appointment as head of the Curtis Institute of Music, with Coulson calling her "sweet and dear and tender", wished Spofford well, said she would "miss her sadly," and added that their apartment would only feel like "home" when they shared it. Later, Spofford and Coulson would travel abroad together in the summer of 1930 to attend the Oberammergau Passion Play, and also visit Salzburg for an opera festival, and other cities such as Bayreuth, Munich, Marienbad, Vienna, and Paris. They would travel again together the following year to Southampton, England, Lucerne, Paris, Vienna, and other locations. Coulson would continue teaching at the Peabody Conservatory of Music until late in her life, when she began living with her sister in Orange, New Jersey. She would die in January 1941 at the Orange Memorial Hospital in Orange, New Jersey.
