= Maria Grazia Rosin =

Italian glass artist

Maria Grazia Rosin (born 1958) is an Italian glass artist. Her work is in the permanent collection of Corning Museum of Glass, New York; Carnegie Museum of Art, Pittsburgh; Kunst Museum, Düsseldorf; and Murano Glass Museum, Italy.

== Biography ==
Rosin was born in Italy, in Cortina d’Ampezzo. She was educated at the Istituto d’Arte in Cortina. In 1979 she moved to Venice and studied under Emilio Vedova at the Academy of Fine Arts, graduating in 1983.

In the 1980s, Rosin painted and worked in graphics, illustration, advertising, and design. By 1994, she was working exclusively with glass. In 2005, she was Artist in Residence at the Corning Museum of Glass. Also in 2005, she was commissioned to create six chandeliers for the restaurant of La Scala Opera House in Milan.
