= Barbara Burrage =

American printmaker (1900–1989)

- Born: December 1, 1900; Lafayette, Indiana, U.S.
- Died: March 4, 1989 (aged 88); Norwalk, Connecticut, U.S.
- Other names: Barbara Stavenitz, Barbara Burrage Stavenitz
- Spouse: Alexander Raoul Stavenitz (m. ?–1960; death)

Barbara Burrage (1900–1989) was an American printmaker. She was married to printmaker Alexander Raoul Stavenitz, whom she sometimes collaborated with.

Her work is included in the collections of the Seattle Art Museum, the National Gallery of Art, the Smithsonian American Art Museum, the Crystal Bridges Museum of American Art and the Princeton University Art Museum.
