= Grace Hirst =

New Zealand businesswoman, farmer, nurse, midwife

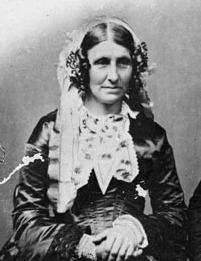
- Grace Hirst, circa 1850s
- Born: Grace Bracken; 9 August 1805; Midgley, Yorkshire, England
- Died: 8 September 1901 (aged 96); New Plymouth, New Zealand
- Occupations: Businesswoman, nurse, midwife, farmer
- Spouse: Thomas Hirst (m. 1829; died 1883)
- Children: 11
- Parents: Jonathan Bracken (father); Grace Appleyard (mother)

Grace Hirst (née Bracken, 9 August 1805 – 8 September 1901) was a New Zealand businesswoman, farmer, nurse and midwife.

== Biography ==
She was born in Midgley, Yorkshire, England on 9 August 1805 as Grace Bracken. She was the daughter of Jonathan Bracken, a paper manufacturer, and Grace Appleyard.

She had a stable and comfortable childhood, and appears to have been well educated, for she was widely read and literate.

She married Thomas Hirst on 22 June 1829 at Halifax, West Yorkshire. They arrived in Taranaki, New Zealand by the ship Gwalior in 1852.

Hirst died on 8 September 1901, aged 96.
