= Grace Aboh Dotou =

Beninese teacher, entrepreneur and activist (born 1943)

- Born: 1943 (age 82–83); Porto Novo, Benin
- Citizenship: Beninese
- Occupations: Teacher, entrepreneur, activist
- Known for: Recycling plastic bags, women's empowerment
- Notable work: Association for the Development of the Women of Sédji
- Awards: United Nations Prize for Eradication of Poverty and Protection of the Environment (2002), Nobel Peace Prize nominee (2005)

Grace Aboh Dotou (sometimes spelled Grace Dotou-Aboh) (born 1943 in Porto Novo, Benin) is a Beninese teacher, entrepreneur and activist. After she retired from teaching, she created a network of women to create clothing and marketable products made from non-biodegradable plastic bags by disinfecting and recycling them. In 2002, Grace Aboh won a United Nations prize for her work and in 2005, she was one of a group of 1,000 women nominated for the Nobel Peace Prize.

== Biography ==
Grace Aboh was born in Porto Novo in 1943 and completed her primary and secondary studies in 1963. In 1964, she earned her elementary Certificate of Educational Aptitude enabling her to become a teacher. In 1980, she created an all-female theatrical group (Qui dit Mieux) for women who, because they were married, were denied the chance to perform on stage with male actors who were not part of their family. When Grace retired from teaching in 1994, she helped create a Non-governmental Organization (NGO) called, the Association for the Development of the Women of Sédji.

In 1996, Grace's dog died after swallowing a plastic bag, which ignited her passion to recycle used plastic bags.

=== Recycling and poverty reduction ===
Aboh's project began by collecting, cleaning, disinfecting and cutting up non-biodegradable bags that had become trash. Then she wove the plastic strips to construct fabric for hats, dolls, placemats, tablecloths and bags. The first product took her six months to finish. In 1997, she organized a local network of women and girls to collect and recycle bags. Under her direction, the girls and women who worked for her gained an education and were employed making and selling their homemade products.

After her group had recycled two million used plastic bags in 2002, United Nations Secretary-General Mr. Kofi Annan awarded Grace (along with the winners from other continents) the Prize for the Eradication of Poverty and Protection of the Environment. Grace attended the award ceremony dressed entirely in clothing made of her group's recycled plastic. Three years later, in 2005, she was one of only two people from Benin (along with Grace Antonia D’Almeida) who were nominated as a group of 1,000 women from around the world for the Nobel Peace Prize.

=== NGO activities ===
In 2004, the NGO had 20 members, five of whom were permanent, who collaborated to make plastic saleable items. When demand for their products increased, either through sales or sold directly to the Ministry of the Environment, the association has hired more local women, up to 25 for bag collection, 40 for cleaning and 50 for weaving. Their wares include clothing, art objects, big shopping bags, small bags, hats, placemats, cup covers, trinkets and dolls.

Initially, the women worked on the recovered plastics at their homes. In 1999, the city council found a convenient location for the NGO to process the plastic waste. However, in 2013 that location was repossessed by the city, which forced the women to do their craft work from their homes.

As part of her mission, Grace raises awareness among village women and teachers about the harmful effects of using plastic bags. She encourages them to carry their purchases on their heads as was the tradition before plastic became available. She has also organized recycling training sessions for unschooled girls to achieve "improvement of the environment, living conditions for women and children, and, finally, financial capacities of women."

=== Film ===
Grace's work was the subject of a short 2006 film from Benin in French, Un trésor dans la poubelle - Alter métier (Another profession - a treasure in the trash).

== Memberships ==
- African Network of Women in NGOs and Associations (RIFONGA)
- Association of Business Women and Business Leaders of Benin (AFACEB)

== Distinctions ==
- In 2002, awarded the United Nations Prize for the Eradication of Poverty and Protection of the Environment
- In 2005, named one of 1,000 women nominated for the Nobel Peace Prize
