= Grace Alexandra Rood =

New Zealand school dental nurse

Grace Alexandra Rood (1893–1981) was a notable New Zealand school dental nurse. She was born in Hampden, Hawke's Bay, New Zealand in 1893.
