= Philip Curtiss =

American author and politician (1885–1964)

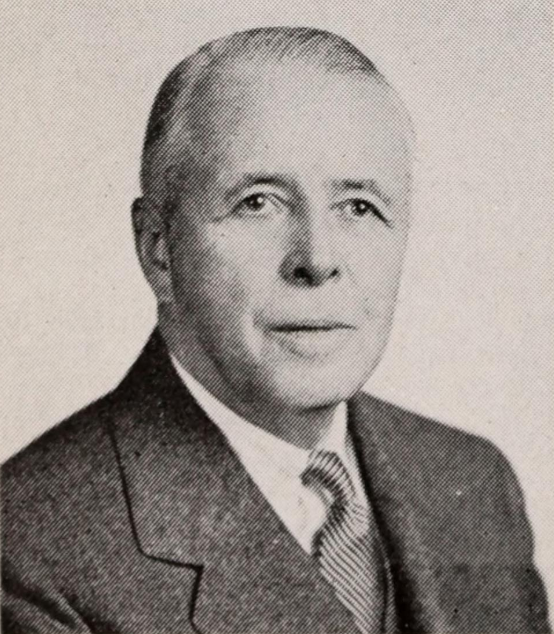
- Curtiss c. 1946

Member of the Connecticut House of Representatives from Norfolk
- In office 1941–1949
- Preceded by: Frank C. Bruey; Grace Schenherr
- Succeeded by: H. Lincoln Foster; Olive Schmeltz

Personal details
- Born: April 10, 1885 Hartford, Connecticut, U.S.
- Died: May 23, 1964 (aged 79) Winsted, Connecticut, U.S.
- Party: Republican
- Spouse: Maude Ida Frederica Knust
- Children: 2
- Education: Trinity College

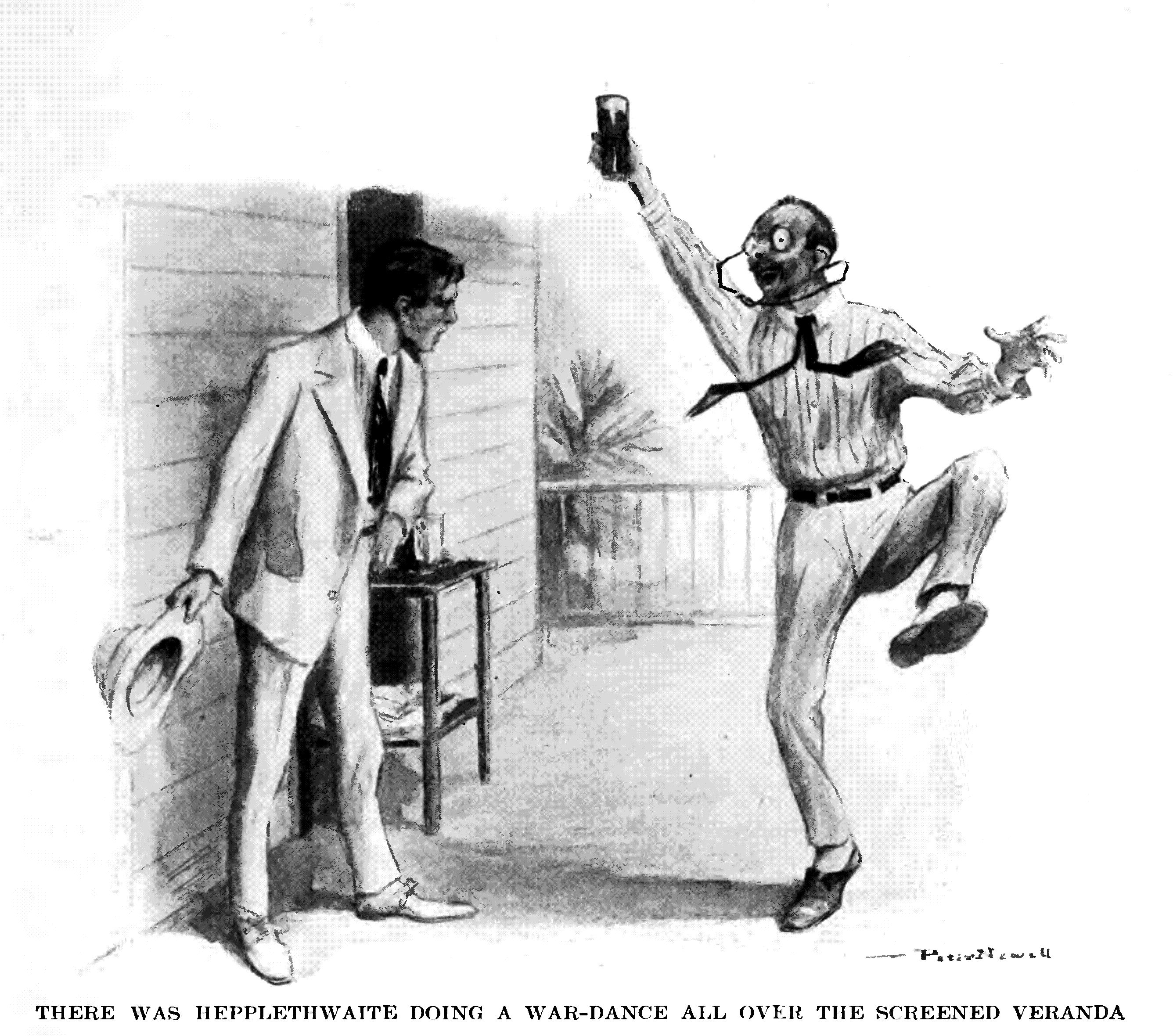
One of the Illustrations of his story The Crocodile's half-sister in Harper's Magazine (1920)

Philip Everett Curtiss (April 10, 1885 – May 23, 1964) was a politician, novelist, and newspaper reporter in Connecticut. He was born in Hartford, Connecticut. A Republican, he served in the Connecticut House of Representatives from 1941 until 1949 and was a trial justice and justice of the peace in Norfolk, Connecticut from 1940 until 1955. He also had his stories published in various magazines including Harper's Magazine. Yale University has a collection of his papers.

He graduated from Hartford Public High School and Trinity College (1906). At Trinity he ran track, was in glee club, and was a member of Psi Upsilon. He studied in Spain and France on a fellowship. He served in the Connecticut National Guard from 1910 - 1916 and was deployed to the border with Mexico. In 1910 he began working for the Hartford Courant and then the Hartford Times. He married Maude Ida Frederica Knust and they had two daughters.

He died in Winsted, Connecticut after a long illness.

== Bibliography ==
- Between Two Worlds, Harper & Brothers, New York 1916
- The Ladder: The story of a casual man Harper & Brothers, New York 1915
- Two Worlds 1916
- Mummers in Mufti The Century Co., New York, 1922
- The Gay Conspirators 1924
