= Killing of Gracie Spinks =

Death of a woman in Derbyshire, England

Gracie Spinks
- Born: 19 October 1997; Old Whittington, Derbyshire England
- Died: 18 June 2021 (aged 23); Derbyshire, England
- Cause of death: Homicide
- Occupation: Lifeguard
- Known for: Victim of murder by a stalker

Gracie Spinks was a lifeguard from Old Whittington who was murdered by a former colleague.

== Background ==
Spinks was a swimming instructor and lifeguard but had been working as a warehouse operative at the time of her death. She was a keen horse rider and kept a horse at Blue Lodge Farm in Duckmanton.

In February 2021 she had reported a former colleague, Michael Sellers, to police for stalking. He had been her supervisor at a warehouse where she once worked.

== Discovery ==
Spinks was last seen alive by her mother at 7:30 am on 18 June 2021, when she left home to tend to her horse. She was found unconscious in the horse's field after 8 am and a man was seen running away. Initially it was thought she had been kicked by the horse, but paramedics realised she had been attacked and called police. She was declared dead at 8:50 am.

Sellers was found dead in a field less than a mile away, at 11 am the same day.

== Inquests ==
Separate inquests were held into the two deaths.

A post-mortem examination determined that Spinks died from a stab wound that severed an artery and her spine. There was no evidence she was sexually assaulted.

It is believed by police that Michael Sellers was responsible for her stab wounds, and that he killed himself afterwards.

== Police conduct ==
After the incident, Derbyshire police referred itself to the Independent Office for Police Conduct due to their previous contact with Gracie. After an investigation disciplinary notices were served on five police officers.

Two were served with notices over their handling of her allegations of stalking against Michael Sellers. A sergeant and two constables were served with misconduct orders over the steps they took after discovering a bag of weapons which included a hammer, an axe and knives in May 2021 near the site where Spinks was eventually stabbed.

Her family has campaigned for "Gracie's law", which would increase funding for investigating stalking cases. Her parents said she was failed by police.

== See also ==
- List of unsolved murders in the United Kingdom (2000–present)
