= Grace d'Almeida =

Beninese lawyer, feminist and human rights activist (1951–2005)

- Born: Grace Antonia Almeida Benoite Adamon; 21 March 1951 (age 75); Dakar, Senegal
- Died: 12 May 2005; Paris
- Occupations: Activist; Lawyer
- Writing career
- Language: French

Grâce d'Almeida Adamon (1951–2005) was a Beninese lawyer, feminist, and human rights activist. She was included in a group of 1,000 women from around the world who were nominated as a group for the 2005 Nobel Peace Prize.

== Biography ==
Grace Antonia Almeida Benoite Adamon was born on 21 March 1951 in Dakar, Senegal. She attended primary school at the Sisters of Porto-Novo and then moved to Dahomey (now Benin) with her family where she attended secondary school. She enrolled in the College of Our Lady of the Apostles in Cotonou and in 1972 took the baccalaureate series A in Guebwiller, France. She earned her diploma and master's degree from Panthéon-Assas University in Paris. She studied law at Pantheon-Sorbonne University, specialising in maritime law and the civil and commercial rights of workers. After receiving her postgraduate DEA, she returned to Pantheon-Assas, where she earned her CAPA law degree.

D'Almeida Adamon started practicing as a lawyer in Paris in 1977. She returned to Cotonou the following year. She was a professor of law at the National University of Benin and was noted for her defence of women's rights.

In 1990, D'Almeida Adamon was elected one of thirteen legal representatives to establish a new, democratic Beninese constitution as part of the National Conference. She was the only woman member. That year, she also founded the Association of Jurists of Benin (AFJB). The human rights organisation promoted women's access to legal services and defended children's and women's rights. She also co-founded the African Institute of Human Rights and the Promotion of Democracy. D'Almeida Adamon worked for United Nations (UN) programmes and non-governmental organisations. She was instrumental in the UN programme that ran Burkina Faso's Democratic Center for Domestic Governance in the 1990s. She participated in the Independent International Commission on Kosovo.

D'Almeida Adamon was co-founder and president of the Association des Femmes Juristes du Bénin (Association of Women Lawyers of Benin). Under her initiative, the organisation created the 114-page booklet Guide juridique de la femme béninoise. The French guide to women's legal rights was translated to Fon and Batonou. She related that, "in taking the initiative for making the judicial guide available to women, the Association of Women Lawyers' goal was to provide Benin's women with a few basic legal procedures based on the legal texts that govern the country to help them better their lives through legal means." D'Almeida Adamon attended the Fourth World Conference on Women in 1995.

From 22 November 1995 to 9 April 1996 she was the Keeper of Seals and Minister of Justice Legislation for Benin's government. Her efforts contributed to the opening of the Women in Law and Development in Africa's Benin section in June 1999. She was the United Nations Development Programme's Chief Technical Advisor and headed up the UN's Justice Project in Haiti from 2000 to 2003. She served on several international human rights committees during her lifetime. She was a member of the International Planned Parenthood Federation and assisted in running the Institute for the League of Human rights in Benin. She was an international consultant in the areas of democracy, electoral assistance, human rights, good governance, and justice, human rights, democracy, good governance and electoral assistance. From October 2004, she was vice-president of the Network of Women Ministers and Parliamentarians of Benin.

In 2005, she was one of only two people from Benin (along with Grace Aboh) who were nominated as a group of 1,000 women from around the world for the Nobel Peace Prize.

D'Almeida Adamon died on 12 May 2005 in Paris. She was divorced and had three children.
