= Grace Vulliamy =

English nurse and charity worker (1878–1957)

Grace Vulliamy CBE
- Born: 12 September 1878; Ipswich, Suffolk, England
- Died: April 1957 near Table Mountain, Cape Town, Union of South Africa
- Occupations: Nurse, refugee and relief worker and charity activist
- Organization(s): War Victims Relief Committee of the Society of Friends; Women's Emergency Corps; Save the Children
- Children: 1

Grace Charlotte Vulliamy CBE (12 September 1878 – April 1957) was an English nurse, refugee and relief worker and charity activist.

== Biography ==
Vulliamy was born on 12 September 1878 in Ipswich, Suffolk, England, to Quakers Arthur Frederick Vulliamy and his wife Anna Marie. She was educated at boarding schools and became a nurse.

During World War I, Vulliamy was organiser of the "War Victims Relief Committee" of the Society of Friends. She joined the Women's Emergency Corps (WEC, which evolved into the Women's Volunteer Reserve) and served in Holland. From Holland, Vulliamy helped to smuggle Belgian war refugees into France, then travelled with them across the English Channel into Britain. She made contact with the refugees through communication with a Dutch woodworker and his English wife.

After the end of the war, Vuliiamy oversaw the nurses and social workers running food distribution centres, schools for disabled children, tuberculosis hospitals and vaccine clinics. She also organised the reception of British civilians who had been held at the Ruhleben internment camp in Germany, meeting them at the Germany-Belgium border, housing them and arranging transport for them back to Britain for their repatriation.

Vulliamy returned home in March 1919. In recognition of her war work, she was appointed a Commander of the Order of the British Empire in the 1919 New Year Honours.

After the Russian Revolution, Vuliiamy undertook relief work in Poland. During the Spanish Civil War, Vuliiamy supported her nieces Chloe and Poppy in making arrangements for evacuating children from Bilbao to England. She was also vice-president of the international non-governmental organization Save the Children Fund.

Vulliamy retired to Cape Town, Union of South Africa, in 1937. However, while in South Africa she started a soup kitchen, a relief centre and a youth club for disadvantaged black youths.

Vulliamy died in April 1957, aged 78, at her home near Table Mountain, Cape Town, Union of South Africa. She was survived by her adopted son, Misha.
