= Grace Marra =

American, Olean, New York-born musician

Grace Marra is an American, Olean, New York-born musician. She currently is the director of the Midland Men of Music, conductor of the Chancel Choir at First United Methodist Church in Midland, Michigan, and is founder and owner of the private voice studio, Grace Notes.

== Men of Music ==
They were originally known as the Dow Male chorus and were affiliated with the Dow Chemical Co., but in 1961 completely removed themselves from Dow and became known as the Men of Music. Marra began their direction in late 1993.

== FUMC ==
Marra has been conducting the adult chancel choir for over 20 years at First United Methodist Church. She has also, in the past, conducted both the children's, youth's, and bell choirs.

== Grace Notes ==
Marra's voice studio had become a landmark throughout the small town of Midland. She currently teaches over 40 students weekly and teaches both children and adults.

== Education ==
Marra graduated 8th in her high school class and went on to the State University of New York at Fredonia, where she earned both a bachelor's degree in music education and performance. She then went on to earn her master's degree at Colorado State University.
