= Grace Tyson =

American Vaudeville performer and actress (1881–1941)

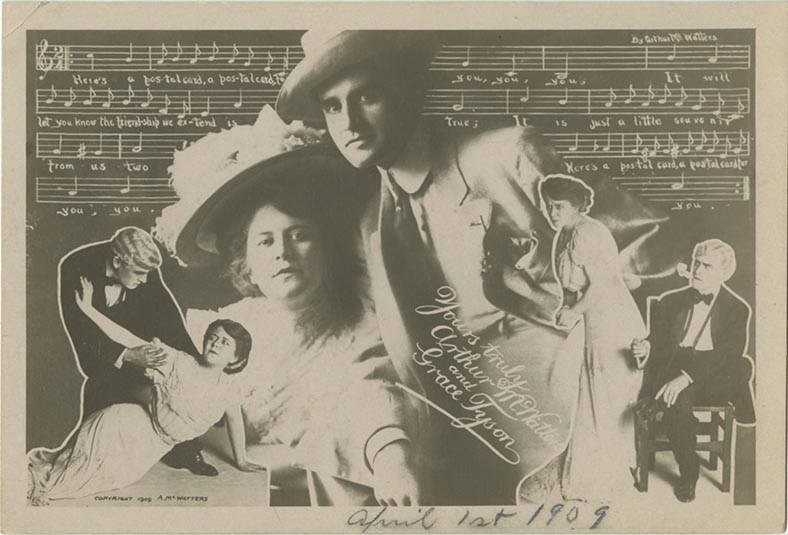
Postcard featuring entertainers Grace Tyson and Arthur McWatters (1909)

Grace May Tyson (February 6, 1881 – October 20, 1941) was an American child singer, vaudeville performer and actress. She partnered with Arthur McWatters, and by 1898, they were performing under the act "McWatters & Tyson." She was a national and international star for four decades.

== Early years ==
Sometimes called Gracie, she was the eldest daughter born in Saginaw, Michigan or Scotts, Michigan on February 6, 1881, to parents Helen and George W. Tyson. She had five siblings, including two sisters who both later became performers: Pearl and Lena Tyson. Grace occasionally performed with them later in life. She went to school at Lovell Street School, No. 3 in Kalamazoo and began performing at the age of 5. By age 11, she performed with the local Getter’s Mastodon Minstrels, traveling throughout the western part of Michigan.

She quickly became known for her "singing abilities, her 'very accomplished' piano skills, and for her commanding stage presence." As a 12-year-old girl, Grace performed with Frank Tucker’s repertory company in Michigan and surrounding states, and "was soon the star attraction."

While touring with the Columbian Stock Company, she met actor Arthur McWatters of Saginaw, Michigan when they were paired together for stage performances. During their routines together, they began to feature McWatters' music compositions. Tyson also started acting in theater productions as a soubrette. In 1898, the couple created the McWatters-Tyson Company, and started to perform together in their own acts.

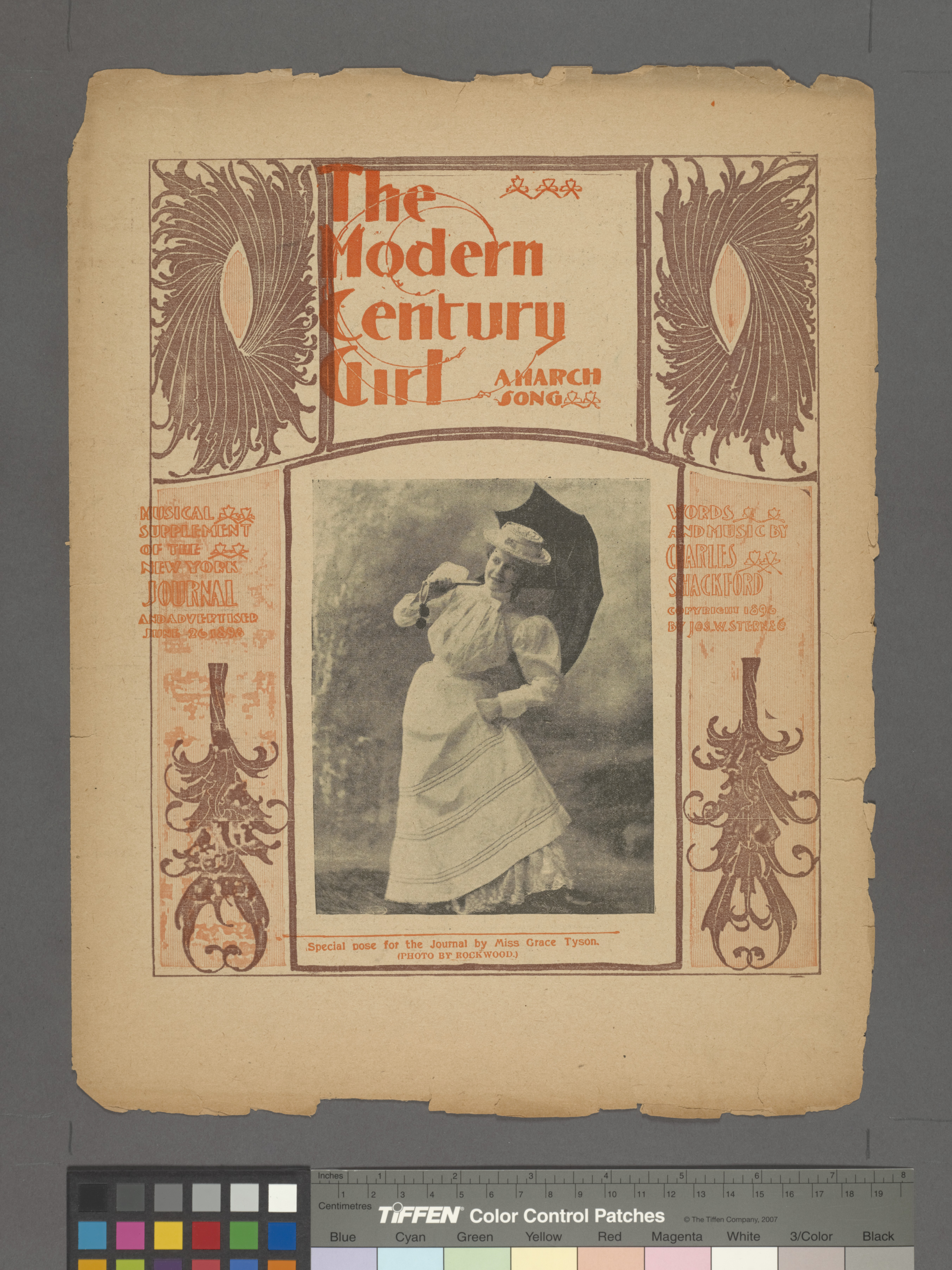
Tyson's photo appearing on the Musical Supplement of the New York Journal and Advertiser, June 26, 1896

Tyson's photograph appeared on the cover of the sheet music for "A Modern Century Girl."

== Later success ==
Tyson achieved national and international success pursuing both a solo and joint careers with McWatters. She starred with Will Rogers in The Girl Rangers in Chicago.

"And by 1910 she was a star in the fourth Ziegfeld Follies in New York. There she performed with the great comedienne Fannie Brice in a skit called In The Music Publisher’s Office and she introduce an actual national hit song by no less a composer than Irving Berlin called That Mesmerizing Mendelssohn Tune (Mendelssohn Rag). At this point Grace Tyson had become a superstar in constant demand, more so than her husband [McWatters]. In a publicity stunt she insured her expressive eyes for $15,000."

By 1912, the couple was earning $1,000 nightly in New York for their joint performances and were forced to turn down many lucrative opportunities because their schedule was filled. In 1913, they performed in South Africa and London, and toured in the United States until at least 1925, when vaudeville's appeal began to fade.

== Personal life ==
Tyson and McWatters were secretly married around 1898, but Tyson kept her stage name, “Miss Grace Tyson,” for her entire career. The couple were performing in Hollywood, California in 1939 when Tyson suffered a stroke. She never fully recovered and resided in a convalescent home for the rest of her life with regular visits from McWatters.

Grace May Tyson died in October 20, 1941 at age 61. Arthur McWatters lived until 1963 when he was 92.

Collections of their papers are held in the American Vaudeville Archive by Arizona University.

== Filmography ==
- Mlle. Irene the Great
