= Graciela Metternicht =

Australian geomorphologist

Graciela Metternicht is a Belgian researcher on environmental geography (geospatial technologies and their application in environmental management and policy).

== Early life and education ==
Metternicht is originally from Belgium. She has a Bachelor of Science and a PhD in Physical Geography from University of Ghent (Belgium).

== Career and impact ==
Currently Metternicht is the Dean of Science at Western Sydney University and Adjunct Professor of Environmental Geography at the Earth and Sustainability Science Research Centre, University of New South Wales.

She was previously a Professor of Environmental Geography in the Environmental Management Programme of the School of Biological, Earth and Environmental Sciences at the University of New South Wales.

She was Regional Coordinator of Early Warning and Assessment of the United Nations Environment Programme (UNEP). Previous academic appointments include Head of Discipline and Professor of Geospatial Systems and Environmental Management at the School of Natural and Built Environments of the University of South Australia and Professor of Spatial Sciences at the Western Australian School of Mines, Curtin University of Technology.

Metternicht has served on the United Nations Convention to Combat Desertification's Science-Policy Interface. She was appointed to the Australia Government's Threatened Species Scientific Committee in December 2023.

Metternicht has produced international outstanding research on the use of spatial information for land degradation and agriculture-related applications. She has received grants from the Australian Research Council and the Australia and New Zealand Cooperative Research Centre for Spatial Information. She was awarded an Honorary Fellowship of the International Cartographic Association.

== Selected works ==
- Metternicht, G. I., & Zinck, J. A. (2003). Remote sensing of soil salinity: potentials and constraints Remote sensing of Environment, 85(1), 1-20.
- Robinson, T. P., & Metternicht, G. (2006). Testing the performance of spatial interpolation techniques for mapping soil properties Computers and electronics in agriculture, 50(2), 97-108.
- Metternicht, G., Hurni, L., & Gogu, R. (2005). Remote sensing of landslides: An analysis of the potential contribution to geo-spatial systems for hazard assessment in mountainous environments. Remote sensing of Environment, 98(2-3), 284–303.
