= Stem Cell and Regenerative Medicine Cluster =

Lithuanian business cluster

- Native name: Kamieninių ląstelių ir regeneracinės medicinos inovacijų klasteris
- Type: Business Cluster
- Industry: Healthcare
- Founded: June 27, 2011; 15 years ago in Vilnius, Lithuania
- Headquarters: Vilnius, Lithuania
- Services: fundamental and applied research in stem cells and regenerative medicine, and related products
- Website: www.kltc.lt

Stem Cell and Regenerative Medicine Cluster (Lithuanian: Kamieninių ląstelių ir regeneracinės medicinos inovacijų klasteris) is a business cluster located in Vilnius, Lithuania. Founded in 2011 the cluster unifies 11 SMEs and state enterprises, including research centers, hospitals, medical centers, and other related institutions. The cluster is currently managed by the Stem Cell Research Center.

== Activities ==
The cluster engages in fundamental and applied scientific research in the fields of stem cells and regenerative medicine. In addition, members of the cluster carry out clinical research (including pre-clinical and clinical trials) in related fields.

Members of the cluster have the capacity to offer an integrated value chain approach, as facilities available include cGMP, in vivo and in vitro testing, and pre-clinical and clinical research.

== Current members ==
- Stem Cell Research Center (JSC Kamieniniu lasteliu tyrimu centras)
- Vilnius University Hospital Santariskiu Klinikos (Vilniaus Universitetine Ligonine Santariskiu Klinikos)
- State Research Institute Center For Innovative Medicine (Valstybinis mokslinių tyrimų institutas Inovatyvios medicinos centras)
- Northway Medical Center (JSC Northway Medicinos Centras)
- Northway Real Estate (JSC Northway Nekilnojamas Turtas)
- Pasilaiciai General Practice (JSC Pasilaiciu seimos medicinos centras)
- Lirema Ophtomology (JSC Lirema)
- Biotechnology center Biotechpharma (JSC Northway Biotech)
- Kardivita Private Hospital (JSC Kardivita privatus medicinos centras)
- Biotechnology park (JSC Biotechnologiju parkas)
- Biosantara (JSC Biosantara)
