= Henry Sweetser Burrage =

American historian

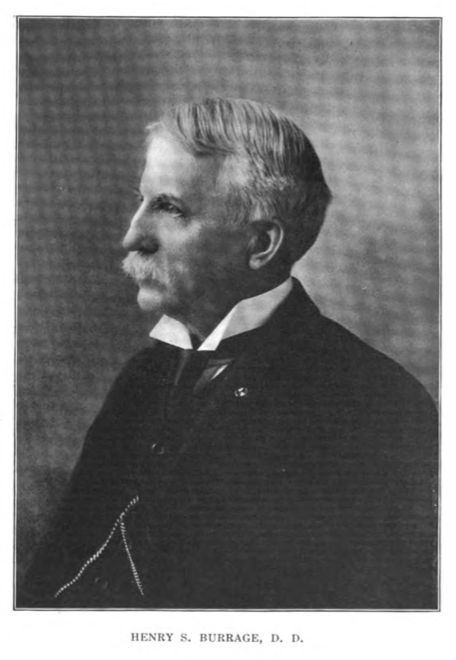
- Born: January 7, 1837; Fitchburg, Massachusetts
- Died: March 9, 1926 (aged 89); Kennebunkport, Maine
- Education: Brown University
- Occupation: Baptist historian

Henry Sweetser Burrage (January 7, 1837 – March 9, 1926) was an American clergyman, editor, and author.

== Biography ==
Burrage was born in Fitchburg, Massachusetts, on January 7, 1837.

Burrage graduated from Brown University in 1861, entered the 36th Massachusetts Regiment as a private, rose to the rank of captain, was wounded at Cold Harbor and brevetted major of volunteers, and became an assistant adjutant general on the staff. He was captured at the siege of Petersburg in November 1864, and held as a prisoner at Libby Prison until February 22, 1865. He resumed his studies at the close of the American Civil War, graduated from Newton Theological Seminary in 1867, spent a year abroad, and from 1869 to 1873 was pastor of the First Baptist Church in Waterville, Maine. This was his only pastorate.

Beginning in 1873, he edited Zion's Advocate, a Baptist religious journal based in Portland, Maine. He edited the journal for 32 years. Beginning in 1876, he was the recording secretary of the American Baptist Union. He was chancellor of the Maine commandery of the Military Order of the Loyal Legion of the United States. Brown gave him the degree of D.D. in 1883. He was a trustee of Colby College, Newton Theological Seminary, and Brown University. He was chaplain for the National Soldiers Home in Togus, Maine.

He was a member and president of the Maine Historical Society, and wrote much on Maine's colonial history. In 1907, he was appointed Maine State Historian, a post he held for the rest of his life.

Burrage was the father of painter Mildred Burrage.

== Publications ==
Burrage edited:

- Brown University in the Civil War (Providence, 1868)
- Henry Wadsworth Longfellow's Seventy-fifth Birthday (Portland, ME, 1882)
- History of the Thirty-sixth Regiment of Massachusetts Volunteers (Boston, 1884)
- Early English and French Voyages: Chiefly from Hakluyt, 1534–1608 (New York, 1906)

He wrote:

- The Act of Baptism in the History of the Christian Church (Philadelphia, 1879)
- History of the Anabaptists in Switzerland (1882)
- Baptist Writers and their Hymns (New York, 1888)
- A history of the Baptists in New England (Philadelphia, 1894)
- History of the Baptists in Maine (Portland, ME, 1904)
