= Delmar Burridge =

American politician

Member of New Hampshire House of Representatives for Cheshire 16
- In office 2012 – December 4, 2018

Member of New Hampshire House of Representatives for Cheshire 3
- In office 2006–2010

Personal details
- Party: Democratic

Delmar D. Burridge is an American politician. He was a member of the New Hampshire House of Representatives.
