= Grace Montañez Davis =

American politician (1926–2020)

Grace Montañez Davis (November 24, 1926 – August 15, 2020) was a political activist and served as the deputy mayor of Los Angeles from 1975 to 1990. She was the first Mexican-American woman to serve in this position.

== Early life ==
Grace Montañez Davis was born in the Lincoln Heights area of Los Angeles. She was the second youngest and only girl of four children born to Mexican immigrants; her mother Belen was a homemaker and her father Alfredo worked in a soap factory. She attended Sacred Heart High School. After high school, she worked in a soap factory and, for a time became factory manager. She went on to attend Immaculate Heart College and received a bachelor's degree in chemistry in 1949. Against her mother's will, she continued her education at UCLA where she received an MS in microbiology.

Though Montañez Davis had a rather happy childhood, she experienced many of the hardships Mexican Americans faced in the early 20th century. She would wake up and find neighbors gone because they had been deported. One of her brothers fought in World War II and served as a paratrooper, but had a difficult time finding a job when he came home because he was Latino. She also witnessed police brutality toward Latinos.

== Personal life ==
In 1952, she married Raymond C. Davis, a political activist. After UCLA, Montañez Davis spent about six months in cancer research at USC School of Medicine, but quit to have a family. She had three children: Deirdra, Alison, and Alfred. After having a family, she left the science field and entered the political world. In 1968, she and Raymond C. Davis divorced. As a divorced mother of three, Montañez Davis blurred the absolute lines of “the traditional and nontraditional patterns of female activism”. Her struggles continued to show the difficulty to balance work and motherhood.

== Early Activism ==
While at UCLA, Montañez Davis attended political lectures and met political activists. She became personally involved with activism. In the 1950s, she became involved with the Community Service Organization, or CSO, a self-help and civil rights organization. At CSO, where she was a member from 1954 to 1960, she taught classes for citizens and voter registration rights and reached thousands of residents. She was actively involved in the political campaigns of Edward Roybal (a member of city council who went on to serve thirty years in the House of Representatives). Montañez Davis was also one of the founding members of the Mexican American Political Association, where she served on the Democratic Party Minority Committee of Los Angeles.

== Career ==
Montañez Davis began working with Congressman George E. Brown Jr. as a field representative in the early 1960s. During this time, she helped implement the antipoverty or Great Society programs of U.S. President Lyndon Johnson in the city of Los Angeles.

After working with Brown, she worked for the government as a manpower development specialist for the U.S. Department of Labor. In 1970, Mayor Thomas Bradley recruited Montañez Davis as Director of Human Resources in his administration. As Director of Human Resources, she administered an ACTION grant which developed the City Volunteer Corps.

=== Deputy Mayor of Los Angeles ===
In 1975, Mayor Bradley selected Montañez to replace Manuel Aragon Jr. as deputy mayor of Los Angeles. She was 48 years old and a divorced mother of three at time. At the time, she was the highest-ranking Latina in city government.

As deputy mayor, she established the city's Department of Justice, Department of Aging, an Office of Volunteers, and an Office for Youth. She oversaw the Department of Community Development, as well as represented the mayor on the Grants committee. She was an advocated for the homeless and worked with the Salvation Army and Red Cross to create the first homeless camp in Los Angeles. She was an avid defender of immigrant rights and was one of the founders of the Los Angeles Chicana feminist group Comision Femenil Mexicana. She also focused on increasing higher education opportunities for Latinos.

She appealed to American women across racial and ethnic lines because of gender and politics. She served as a middle-class role model at women's conferences, but she also sympathized with working-class women.

== The Grace Montañez Davis Collection ==
The Grace Montañez Davis Collection is a collection of materials which relate to Davis’ activities as deputy mayor from the years 1973 to 1978. The collection contains over 90 boxes of materials, covering many of the issues Montanez Davis advocated. The collection is housed at the Southern Regional Library Facility in Los Angeles. The materials are non-circulating, but may be requested through UCLA's Chicano Studies Research Center Library.
