= Gracie (name) =

Gracie is a surname and a feminine given name, usually a diminutive form of Grace.

== Surname ==
- Charlie Gracie (1936–2022), American guitarist and singer
- Gracie family of New York City:
  - Archibald Gracie (1755–1829), Scottish-born shipping magnate and early American businessman
  - Archibald Gracie II (1795–1865), Son of Archibald Gracie
  - Archibald Gracie III (1832–1864), United States Army officer and Confederate brigadier general
  - Archibald Gracie IV (1859–1912), American writer and survivor of the sinking of the RMS Titanic
- Gracie family in Canada:
  - John Gracie (born 1984), Canadian Internet/media personality known as Fade Dragontear
- Gracie family, lineage of Brazilian jiu-jitsu practitioners, several of whom participated in mixed martial arts (MMA)
  - Carlos Gracie (1902–1994), co-founder of the martial art of Brazilian jiu-jitsu
  - Carlos Gracie Jr. (born 1956) or "Carlinhos", founder of the Gracie Barra Academy in Rio de Janeiro, Brazil
  - Carlson Gracie Sr. (1932–2006), eldest son of Carlos Gracie
  - Hélio Gracie (1913–2009), co-founder of Brazilian jiu-jitsu
  - Kyra Gracie (born 1985), Brazilian jiu-jitsu black belt and champion
  - Neiman Gracie (born 1988), Brazilian mixed martial artist
  - Ralek Gracie (born 1985), Brazilian jiu-jitsu practitioner and mixed martial artist
  - Ralph Gracie (born 1971), son of Robson Gracie
  - Renzo Gracie (born 1967), mixed martial artist and trainer
  - Rickson Gracie (born 1958), son of Hélio Gracie and two-time Vale Tudo Japan tournament winner
  - Robson Gracie (1935–2023), second son of Carlos Gracie
  - Roger Gracie (born 1981), multi-time world champion in BJJ and submission grappling, mixed martial artist
  - Rolls Gracie (1951–1982), nephew of Helio Gracie
  - Rolles Gracie Jr. (born 1978), mixed martial artist
  - Rorion Gracie (born 1952), co-founder of the UFC
  - Royce Gracie (born 1966), UFC 1, 2 & 4 tournament winner and UFC Hall of Famer
  - Royler Gracie (born 1965), Brazilian jiu-jitsu coach
  - Ryan Gracie (1974–2007), mixed martial artist

== Given name ==
- Gracie Abrams (born 1999), American singer-songwriter
- Gracie Allen (1895–1964), American comedian and wife of George Burns
- Gracie Carvalho (born 1990), Brazilian model
- Gracie Cole (1924–2006), British trumpeter and bandleader
- Gracie Dzienny (born 1995), American actress
- Gracie Fields (1898–1979), English/Italian singer and comedian
- Gracie Gilkyson (born 2003), Canadian ice hockey player
- Gracie Gold (born 1995), American figure skater
- Gracie McGonigal (born 2002), British actress
- Gracie Pfost (1906–1965), American politician
- Gracie Watson (1882–1889), child subject of a sculpture by John Walz

== See also ==
- Gracie (disambiguation)
