= Graziella (given name) =

Graziella is a feminine given name. Notable people with the name include:

- Graziella Attard Previ, Maltese politician
- Graziella Concas (born 1970), Italian pianist and composer
- Graziella Curreli (born 1960), French sculptor working in the Netherlands
- Graziella de Michele (born 1956), French singer-songwriter of Italian descent
- Graziella Fontana (fl. 1965–1972), Italian fashion designer
- Graziella Galea, Maltese politician
- Graziella Galvani (born 1931), Italian stage, television and film actress
- Graziella Granata (born 1941), Italian film and stage actress
- Graziella Magherini (fl. 1989), Italian psychiatrist
- Graziella Marok-Wachter (born 1965), Liechtenstein politician
- Graziella Moretto (born 1972), Brazilian actress
- Graziella Pareto (1889–1973), Catalan soprano leggiero
- Graziella Pellegrini (born 1961), Italian stem cell biologist
- Graziella Schmitt (born 1981), Brazilian actress
- Graziella Sciutti (1927–2001), Italian soprano opera singer and producer

== See also ==
- Grazia (given name)
- Grace (given name)
