= Grace Schenherr =

American politician (died 1958)

Member of the Connecticut House of Representatives from Norfolk
- In office 1935–1941
- Preceded by: Henry C. Gidman; W. Fisk Stevens
- Succeeded by: Philip Curtiss; Frank C. Bruey

Personal details
- Born: 1874 or 1875
- Died: March 30, 1958 (aged 83) Baltimore, Maryland, U.S.
- Party: Republican
- Spouse: Hubert Schenherr (died 1933)
- Children: 1

Grace Schenherr (1874 or 1875 – March 30, 1958) was an American politician who served in the Connecticut House of Representatives from 1935 to 1941, representing the town of Norfolk as a Republican. From 1937 to 1942, Schenherr served on the Republican State Central Committee. She was married to Hubert Schenherr.
