= Sabine Klauke =

German aerospace executive

Sabine Klauke (born July 7, 1973, in Aachen) is a German aerospace executive. In July 2025, she was appointed Head of Digital Design Manufacturing and Services at Airbus to accelerate drive the company’s digital transformation across all divisions.

Until June 2025, she was chief technology officer (CTO) for Airbus and executive vice president (EVP) engineering for its commercial aircraft business. As such, she also was a member of the company’s executive committee since July 2021.

== Early life and education ==
Sabine Klauke studied mechanical engineering at the technical university TU Dresden and INSA Hauts de France (formerly known as École Nationale Supérieure d’Ingénieurs en Mécanique Énergétique in Valenciennes (ENSIMEV)), pursuing her passion for mathematics, optimisation and its practical applications. She holds a PhD in mechanical engineering from TU Dresden focusing on digital concurrent engineering processes between manufacturing and engineering and the optimization of factory design processes.

== Career ==
Klauke began her professional career in 1998 at the mid-sized company DELMIA, a brand of Dassault Systèmes, where she was responsible for the deployment of digital manufacturing software as well as consulting projects with customers in the automotive and the aerospace industries worldwide.

In 2002 Klauke joined Airbus, where she held various management and executive positions in the commercial aircraft business of the company, working with international teams in France and Germany, Great Britain and Spain on core new aircraft projects such as the A380 megaliner and the A350.

From 2015 to 2018 she served as an executive in the aftermarket segment of the company, ensuring the safe and reliable operations of the worldwide fleet with the customers as Head of Programmes Customer Services. Her responsibility was first for the A330/A340 programmes and grew then to the overall worldwide Airbus fleet.

In 2018, she was appointed executive vice president engineering within Airbus Defence and Space and member of the division's executive committee. In this capacity, she was responsible for all engineering activities within the Defence and Space division, including research and technology and innovation.

In July 2021, Klauke was appointed chief technical officer (CTO) of Airbus, in charge of the Technology & Engineering department. As such, she drives the company's ambition to deliver technologies enabling a sustainable future of aerospace leading a team of more than 13,000 employees across the globe, who design, develop, certify and ensure continuous airworthiness of all Commercial Aircraft products and services as well as the technology path for the overall Group.

Since 2024, she was chief technology officer for Airbus and executive vice president engineering of its commercial aircraft business. In July 2025, she took over the newly created position of Head of Digital Design Manufacturing and Services at Airbus to develop and implement a digitalised end-to-end value chain across the company, preparing the company for a next product development.

Klauke also grew her responsibility in industry associations, such as VDI and BDLI, with the following mandates:

- Co-Chair of the European Research Programme “Clean Aviation Joint Undertaking” (CAJU). She passed on this role to Rémi Maillard in September 2025.
- Vice president aviation for the German Aerospace Industries Association (BDLI)
- Chairperson of the supervisory board of Airbus GmbH in Germany.

In 2024, Klauke became a Fellow of the Royal Aeronautical Society (FRAeS) and was named the “most influential woman in the German economy 2023” by the German economic newspaper manager magazin. In the same year, she was appointed Knight (Chevalier) in the French Legion of Honour and received the Aachen Engineering Award.

== Personal life ==
Klauke is married with two children and lives in Toulouse. She enjoys being in contact with nature and getting energy from outdoor activities, such as hiking in the mountains. As a former saxophone player, attending music events is still one of her preferred pastimes.
