= Grace Etsuko Lee =

- Origin: San Francisco, California, USA
- Occupation(s): Marketing, Teacher, Speaker, Author
- Website: GLI Website

Grace Etsuko Lee is an author and the president/founder of Grace Lee International.

== As an Author ==
In 2010, her first published book, Little Caterpillar in Training: A Culture in Transition and Its Mixed Child in Post-war Japan, got the attention of the Japanese American National Museum. Grace is currently working with the museum to promote their National Diversity Education Program.

Lee has been quoted as saying

"Americans are unique in the sense that they can pick the strengths and positive benefits from other cultures and incorporate them into their own society. This combining brings the best social graces from every culture to become the powerful American culture of the future."
