= Grace (Canadian singer) =

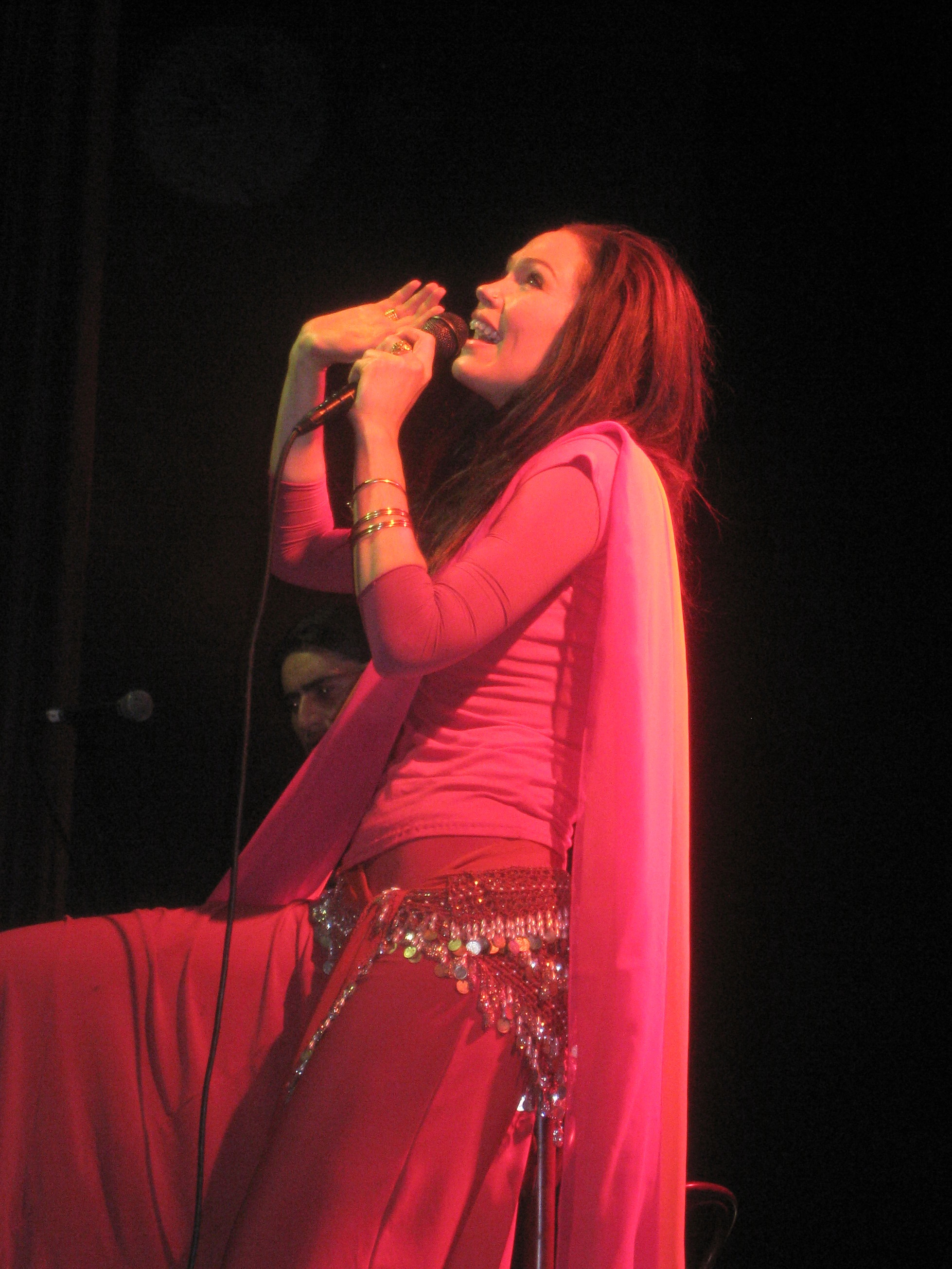
- Grace performing in Paris in 2008.

Background information
- Born: Grace Young; Nova Scotia, Canada
- Genres: Folk, reggae, blues, soul
- Occupations: Singer, songwriter
- Instruments: Vocals, guitar
- Years active: 2006–present
- Label: Mercury / Universal
- Website: Official Website

Grace Young, or more commonly known as Grace, is a Canadian-born American musician, signed to Universal Music, She sings folk, reggae, soul and blues-style original songs. Grace has released two albums, Hall of Mirrors and Made for Change.

== Childhood ==
Grace was born in a little cabin in the forest in Nova Scotia, Canada. She grew up travelling on buses because her parents were musicians and part of the peace and love movement; occasionally, Emmylou Harris watched over her while her parents were performing.

When she was seven years old, she moved to Kenya, where her mother was engaged in a humanitarian mission. As she grew older, she lived in and travelled to many places - Senegal, Ethiopia, France, India, Jamaïca... - and has more recently settled in Paris, California, and New York. She calls herself a "nomad" because she traveled extensively in Africa, India, Europe and South America.

She currently resides in the South of France, Miami, and New York.

== Career ==
Grace's career started in French underground venues (New Morning, Réservoir, la Scène Bastille, la Bellevilloise...). After having opened shows for the likes of James Blunt or Just Jack, Grace gained public notoriety with the interpretation of her single Imagine One Day for the World Music Day, which was broadcast by France 2, the main French public TV channel. Other TV appearances include the famous French musical show Taratata, where she sang Stevie Wonder's I Wish with Amadou & Mariam. She toured extensively across France between 2008 and 2009, ending the tour with a packed Bataclan, in Paris.

Grace then travelled for a year between the USA, Brazil, and the South of France to work on her second album. On July 14, 2011, she participated in an event organized by the French anti-racist NGO SOS Racisme, in front of more than 1,200,000 spectators, where she interpreted a duo with the singer Jehro (Master Blaster).

== Albums ==
=== Hall of Mirrors (2008) ===
Her first major-label album, titled Hall of Mirrors, was released in October 2008, by Mercury / Universal. Grace was awarded a gold disc in 2009 and her single "Imagine One Day" became N°1 of singles digital sales in the Folk/Soul category.

1. Lost

2. Open Road

3. Imagine One Day

4. Just Look Away

5. Bang Bang

6. Gambler

7. Working Together

8. To The East

9. Geisha

10. Butterfly

11. Go Your Way

12. Who Will Tell Them

13. New Day

14. All You'll Need

Latabi Diouani - batterie, percussions

Sly Johnson - chœurs, beatbox

Philippe Aglaé - chœurs, percussions

Linda Rey - chœurs

Jérome Degey - guitare, basse, arrangements

Oz Fritz - ingénieur du son

=== Made for Change (2012) ===
Grace's second album, Made for Change, was arranged and produced by Jerome Degey and mixed by Jimmy Douglass (Timbaland, AC/DC, Justin Timberlake, Al Green...). Grace wrote the lyrics and music for the album's eleven titles. The album was recorded in France, Brazil, and in the USA with the Victory Riders, who played with Grace on her first tour; her parents also appear on the album. Made for Change is musically more ambitious than Hall of Mirrors; it explores a large array of sounds and styles, reflecting Grace's love for traveling. The album also echoes Grace's commitment to preserving the environment, since it was largely inspired by a concert held in the middle of the Amazonian rainforest, as a protest against deforestation.

1. Like a Phoenix

2. Headin' West

3. I Know You Can

4. Rainbow Hour

5. Broken Home

6. Cannot Go Back

7. Solid Gold

8. Salam Mama

9. Lord I'm Thankful

10. No Better Place

11. Made for Change
