= Grace Burbridge =

British suffragette

- Born: 15 July 1887
- Occupation(s): typist and suffragette
- Known for: suffragette activism; set fire to pillarbox and was injured

Grace Edith Burbridge (born 15 July 1887) was a British suffragette, burned whilst setting fire to a postbox.

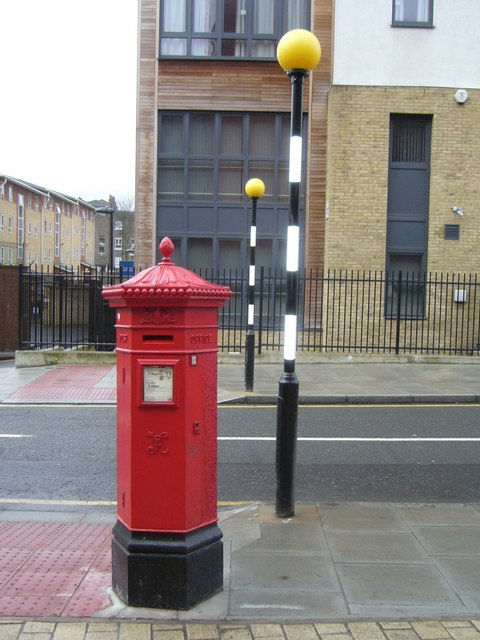
Victorian pillar box and Belisha beacons, St Pancras Way - geograph.org.uk - 1712548

== Life and activism ==
Burbridge was born in 1887 in Holloway, Middlesex, to William and Harriet Burbridge.

Burbridge became a shorthand typist. By the age of 25, her salary supported her father and sister living in Hartham Road, Holloway.

Burbridge became involved in the militancy for women's suffrage. She was arrested in 1913 after setting fire to a postbox at the junction of Camden Road and Sandhall Road, London, with liquid phosphorus and badly burning her own arm in the process. The postman had collected the letters before noticing they were on fire and attempted to save the mail, a nearby postman noticed a woman with her arm in "blue flames" screaming, and contacted the police. A policeman followed Burbridge to a nearby doctor and overheard her confess to the doctor as to how she became burned, and where she left the chemical, which was collected in evidence.

Burbridge's case at the Marylebone Police Court, was defended by Arthur Marshall, husband of Kitty Marshall, who in leading her defence, emphasised Burbridge's role as the main earner for her father and sister, as a typist, and her suffering and pain. The magistrate noted the "peculiar circumstances" and she was bound over to keep the peace rather than imprisoned. The news of her action and injury spread as far as Australia, under the headline "The Biter Bitten" and in another report the magistrate was quoted as calling her "a poor deluded dupe."
