= C5H5NO =

The molecular formula C_{5}H_{5}NO (molar mass: 95.10 g/mol, exact mass: 95.03711 u) may refer to:

- Pyridone
  - 2-Pyridone
  - 3-Pyridone
  - 4-Pyridone
- Pyridine-N-oxide
