= C5H4O2 =

The molecular formula C_{5}H_{4}O_{2} (molar mass: 96.085 g/mol) may refer to:

- Furfural (2-furaldehyde)
- 3-Furaldehyde
- Protoanemonin
- Pyrones
  - 2-Pyrone
  - 4-Pyrone
