= Centre for the Comparative Analysis of Law and Economics, Economics of Law, Economics of Institutions =

Coordinates: 45°00′00″N 7°41′06″E

CLEI, the Centre for the Comparative Analysis of Law and Economics, Economics of Law, Economics of Institutions is a research center founded in 2004 by four research universities, Cornell Law School (School of Law, John M. Olin Program in Law and Economics), Ecole Polytechnique (Pole de Recherche en Economie et Gestion), University of Turin (Dipartimenti di Economia 'S.Cognetti de Martiis', Scienze Economiche e Finanziarie 'G.Prato', Scienze Giuridiche) and the University of Ghent (Law School, Centre for Advanced Studies in Law and Economics).

Subsequently, the centre has been expanded to include the following partner universities.

- Marburg University
- University of Eastern Piedmont
- University of Economics, Prague
- Université Paul Cézanne Aix-Marseille III
- Panthéon-Assas University

== Purpose ==
Though the law and economics movement has continental foundations as well as roots in American jurisprudence, over the past fifteen years the field has grown to be dominated by the Chicago law and economics school. Despite the dominance of the Chicago approach, international scholars have made vast contributions to the field, and to the broader themes of legal theory surrounding law and economics. The purpose of the CLEI Center and its IEL (Institutions, Economics, Law) Ph.D. program is to foster an alternative approach to the comparative analysis of law and economics. To further this mission, the CLEI Centre and the Collegio Carlo Alberto attract highly qualified economists and legal theorists from around the world to introduce students to alternative traditions in the law and economics movement.

The CLEI Centre also sponsors scholarship focusing on empirical analysis of law.

== CLEI/IEL Program ==
The centerpiece of CLEI is a three-year Ph.D. program. The program is administered by the University of Turin, graduate division. The CLEI Center also offers a one-year Master's program in Institutions, Economics and Law. The coordinator of the program is Prof. Giovanni B. Ramello.

The Center sponsors conferences, visiting lecturers, and various other keynote addresses.

Speakers at CLEI have included Guido Calabresi, Duncan Kennedy and Ugo Mattei.

== Location ==
The CLEI centre is located in Moncalieri (a city in the province of Turin) within the historic Collegio Carlo Alberto.
