= University of Turin =

University in Turin, Italy

- Università degli Studi di Torino
- Latin: Alma Universitas Taurinensis
- Type: Public research university
- Established: c. 1404; 622 years ago
- Founder: Louis of Piedmont
- Accreditation: MIUR
- Academic affiliations: EUA; IAU; UNIMED; NEREUS; SAR; UNITA; CINECA; NETVAL; ICON
- Endowment: €460 million (2018)
- Rector: Cristina Prandi
- Academic staff: 2,152
- Administrative staff: 1,879
- Students: 81,200 (February 2022)
- Undergraduates: 78,900 (February 2022)
- Postgraduates: 1,200 (February 2022)
- Doctoral students: 1,100 (February 2022)
- Location: Turin, Piedmont, Italy; 45°04′10″N 7°41′20″E
- Campus: Urban
- Sports teams: CUS Torino
- Colors: Gray & Black
- Mascot: Toro the Bull
- Website: unito.it

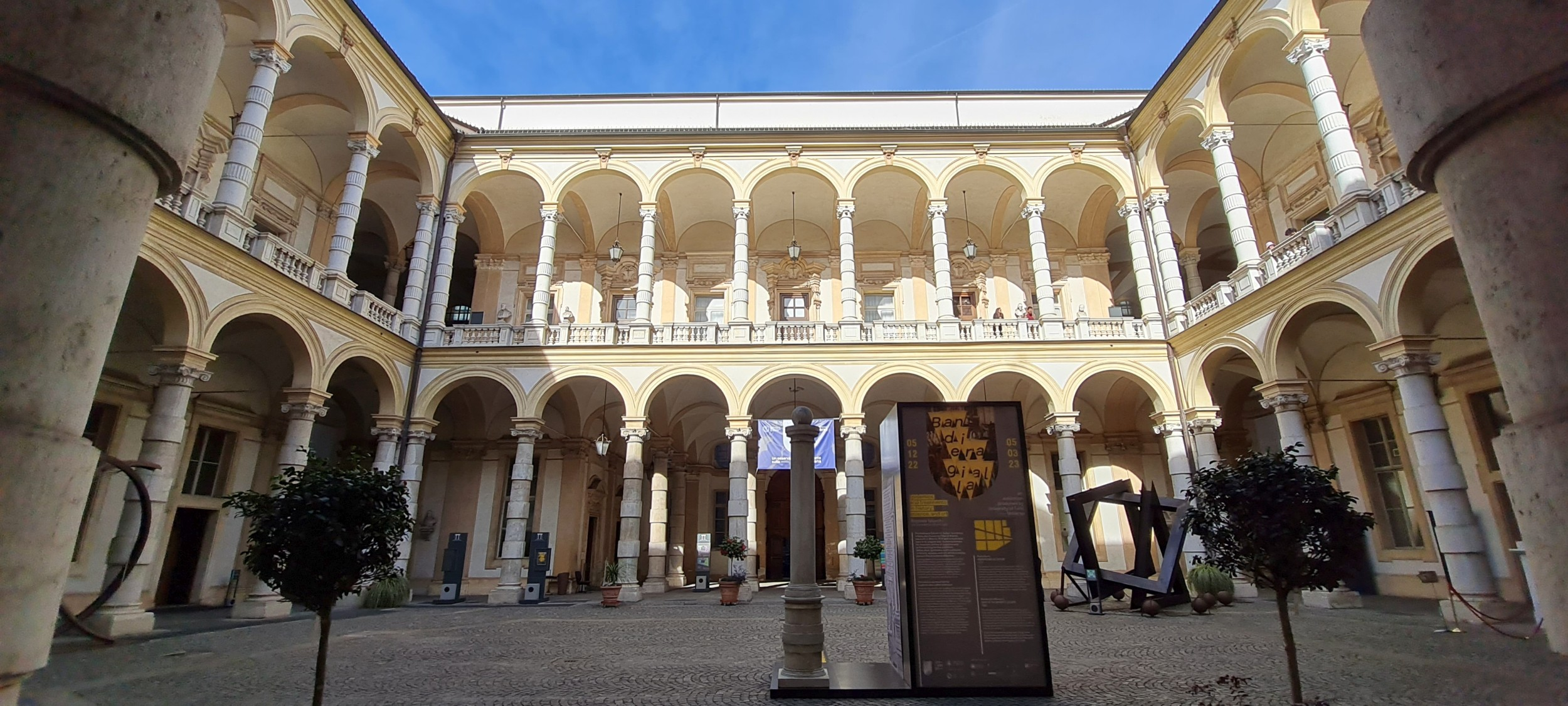
Hall of the Rectorate Palace of the University of Turin

The University of Turin (Italian: Università degli Studi di Torino, UNITO) is a public research university in the city of Turin, in the Piedmont region of Italy. It is one of the oldest universities in Europe and continues to play an important role in research and training.

== History ==
=== Overview ===
The University of Turin was founded as a studium in 1404, under the initiative of Prince Ludovico di Savoia. From 1427 to 1436 the seat of the university was transferred to Chieri and Savigliano. It was closed in 1536 following the invasion of the Savoy lands by France, and reestablished by Duke Emmanuel Philibert thirty years later. It started to gain its modern shape following the model of the University of Bologna, although significant development did not occur until the reforms made by Victor Amadeus II, who also created the Collegio delle Province for students not natives of Turin.

With the reforms carried out by Victor Amadeus II, the University of Turin became a new reference model for many other universities. During the 19th century, the university faced an enormous growth in faculty and endowment size, becoming a point of reference of the Italian Positivism. Notable scholars of this period include Cesare Lombroso, Carlo Forlanini, and Arturo Graf.

In the 20th century, the University of Turin was one of the centres of the Italian anti-fascism movement. After the post-war period, the increase in the number of students and the improvement of campus structure were imposed, although they lost some of their importance until a new wave of investments was carried out at the end of that century. The new impulse was performed in collaboration with other national and international research centres, as well as with local organizations and the Italian Minister of Public Instruction.

By the end of the 1990s, the local campuses of Alessandria, Novara, and Vercelli became autonomous units under the new University of Eastern Piedmont.

=== Early years (1404–1566) ===
At the beginning of the 15th century, instability in the Lombard region caused by the political and military crisis, coupled with the untimely death of Gian Galeazzo Visconti, induced the teaching staff of the Universities of Pavia and Piacenza to propose to Ludovico di Savoia-Acaia the creation of a new Studium generale.

Choice of the location fell on Turin for a number of reasons: first, it was at the crossroads between the Alps, Liguria and Lombardy; it was also an episcopal seat and in addition, the Savoy Prince was willing to establish a university on his own land, like those in other parts of Italy. In autumn 1404, a bull issued by Benedict XIII, the Avignon Pope, marked the actual birth of a centre of higher learning, formally ratified in 1412 by the Emperor Sigmund's certification and subsequently, in 1413, by a bull issued by antipope John XXIII, the Pisan Pope, and probably by another issued in 1419 by Martin V, Pope of Rome, and by a series of papal privileges. The new institution, which initially only held courses in civil and canon law, was authorized to confer both the academic "licentia" and "doctoratus" titles that later became a single "laurea" (degree) title. The Bishop, as Rector of Studies, proclaimed and conferred the title on the new doctors.

The early decades were marked by discontinuity, due to epidemics and crises that plagued the region between the 1420s and the 1430s following the annexation of the Piedmont territories to the Duchy of Savoy and by difficult relations between the university and the local public administration. After a series of interruptions in its activities, the university was moved to Chieri (between 1427 and 1434) and later, in 1434, to Savigliano.

In 1436, when the institution returned to Turin, Ludovico di Savoia, who succeeded Amedeo VIII, introduced a new order of studies whereby the government gained greater control over the university. The ducal licenses of 6 October 1436 set up the three faculties of Theology, Arts and Medicine, and Law, and twenty-five lectureships or chairs. The growth and development of the role of Turin as the subalpine capital led to the consolidation of the university and stability that lasted for almost a hundred years.

From 1443 the university was housed in a modest building purchased and refurbished by the city for this purpose on the corner of via Doragrossa (now Via Garibaldi) and via dello Studio (today's via San Francesco d'Assisi) directly behind the Town Hall, until the opening of the university premises in via Po, in 1720. The Study, closed at the beginning of 1536 with the French occupation, reopened in 1558 with lecturers at Mondovì; it was re-established in Turin in 1566.

The Minerva Statue in front of the Rectorate Palace at the University of Turin.

=== Instability and reform by Victor Amadeus II (1566–1739) ===
With Emmanuel Philibert and Charles Emmanuel I, the university enjoyed a season of great prosperity due to the presence of illustrious teachers and a sizeable and culturally motivated student body. However, a lengthy period of decline set in around the second half of the 17th century because of plagues, famines and continual wars: courses were irregular or temporarily suspended, the number of chairs was reduced, and for those temporarily vacant, it was necessary to resort to private instruction.

The opening of the new premises marked a major turning point in the history of the greatest Piedmontese educational institution. The inauguration building in via Po, close to Piazza Castello, and the seats of power and other educational institutions of the city, coincided with the academic year 1720–1721, the first year of the reform of university studies passed by Victor Amadeus II in the context of a radical renewal at all levels of public administration and education.

Victor Amadeus II was convinced that an efficient university controlled directly by the state was the only way to form a faithful and well-trained ruling class that could support him in the process of modernizing the Nation. While the War of Spanish Succession was still being fought, the Duke had entrusted his officials to gather information concerning the structure of the major Italian and foreign universities, and charged the Sicilian jurist Francesco D'Aguirre with the task of drawing up a reorganization project.

Among the notable innovations of the reform enacted by Victor Amadeus was the opening of the Collegio delle Province (Halls of Residence for the Provinces), which housed one hundred young people of low social extraction to aid them in completing their studies at the State's expenses, and the establishment of the chair of Eloquenza Italiana (Italian rhetoric) alongside that of Latin. This had a noteworthy effect on the cultural-linguistic models of the Duchy. At the time, the Piedmontese Studium became a point of reference for university reforms at Parma and Modena and subsequently, a model for the universities in Cagliari and Sassari.

=== French domination (1739–1817) ===
Charles Emmanuel III continued the policy of innovation and consolidation begun by Victor Amadeus II and created a University Museum in 1739. However, in the last decades of the 18th century, the course of events at the university, closely connected to international developments, led to great urban unrest and the loss of state prestige. The revolt of university students in 1791 joined by artisans who stormed the "Collegio delle Province" in 1792 causing numerous victims, was a clear instance of this conflict.

The university and "Collegio" were closed in the autumn of the same year when war broke out against revolutionary France. In January 1799, the provisional Piedmontese government reopened the university under the control of the "Comité d'instruction publique" (Committee for Public Instruction). In summer 1800, the second provisional government transformed the university into a national university and replaced the faculties with eight special schools, which were based on the existing pattern: chemistry and rural economy, surgery, drawing and fine arts, legislation, medicine, physical and mathematical sciences, literature and veterinary medicine. Two years later, literature was abolished, medicine and surgery were merged and many chairs were suppressed for financial reasons.

Another milestone in the Turin university system was the introduction of the new Imperial order, since Piedmont had become a French Department; this involved the personal appointment by Napoleon of a rector to head each university. Because of its size, number of chairs, teaching staff and students the Piedmontese University became the second largest in the empire after Paris.

A famous student of this age was Joseph-Louis Lagrange.

=== Age of Victor Emmanuel I (1817–1832) ===
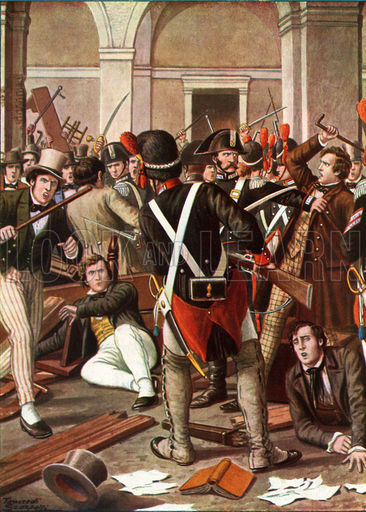
The revolt of the students of Turin University, 1821

With the fall of Napoleon, Victor Emmanuel I brought back the former legislation of the Savoy regime. Innovations in the following years involved the establishment of the chair of political economy in the Faculty of Law in 1817, the opening of a veterinary school at Venaria in 1818, and a new procedure for the appointment of the rector by the academic staff of each faculty, who proposed to the sovereign a list of names of retired or teaching professors.

The uprisings in 1821 were supported by students in Turin to the extent that the Collegio delle Province had to be closed and the university itself operated only to a limited degree. To prevent student assemblies in the capital, it was ordered that all students who did not come from the provinces of Turin, Pinerolo and Susa would continue their education in their place of residence, where coaches went to supervise the progress of their studies and to conduct so-called "private" examinations. In this period too participation in the appointment of the rector was restricted: the president of the magistrature submitted the names of five candidates to the king, chosen among the teaching staff of surgery, medicine, sciences, Law, Literature and Theology but without the involvement of the professors.

=== The Charles Albert years (1832–1864) ===
Charles Albert's opening up to moderate liberalism and his international outlook had positive effects on the university, too: like the development of institutions and the foundation of others, in addition to the appointment of illustrious scholars such as the French Augustin Cauchy to teach sublime physics and the Dalmatian Pier Alessandro Paravia to the chair of Italian rhetoric.

In 1832 the Institute of Forensic Medicine was set up, in 1837 a specialization course in obstetrics was introduced and a new theatre and museum of anatomy was opened at the San Giovanni Battista Hospital to bring together the materials stored at the university and those collected since 1818 at the Museum of Pathological Anatomy. In 1842 the Collegio delle Province was reopened and students gradually resumed attending courses, which were better organized thanks to the increased number of chairs. An Upper School of Methods and the chair of the military history of Italy (1846)—which became the chair of modern history—were set up. The chair of political economy was revived.

The new order of 1850 redesigned the Medicine and Surgery course to give scope for clinical experience and practice in hospitals and laid the foundations for the School of Pharmacology, which later became a faculty.

=== Brief decline and revival in academic research (1864–1905) ===
Cultural life involving intellectuals and exiles, journalists and politicians was very lively inside and outside the university until the capital was moved to Florence: its decline commenced when members of the teaching staff were called to government duties or to State management. Thus the circles that gravitated around the Court thinned and the City itself dropped from 220,000 inhabitants to less than 190,000.

However, the university managed to find new life among the science faculties and their staff: in fact, in early 1864, Filippo de Filippi, professor of zoology in the Science Faculty, held the first lecture in Italy on the theories of Charles Darwin. At his death, in 1867, Michele Lessona succeeded to the chair and became director of the Museum of Zoology, then dean of the Faculty of Sciences and, finally, rector from 1877 to 1880.

Botanic Gardens.

Thanks to Giulio Bizzozero, who founded the Laboratory of General Pathology (1873) and contributed largely to the spread of the microscope in addition to discovering blood platelets, medicine in Turin branched out into the field of social medicine to meet the health and sanitary needs of the population, in particular with regard to infectious diseases and infant mortality.

The political activities of Luigi Pagliani, professor of hygiene and founder in 1878 of the Hygiene Society, were at the basis of the strategies of public health in Italy, while discoveries made by Edoardo Bellarmino Perroncito, the first to hold a chair of parasitology in Italy (1879), saved the lives of thousands of miners all over Europe.

In 1876, Cesare Lombroso set up the Institute of Forensic Medicine; in 1884 Carlo Forlanini tried out the first artificial lung in Turin.

In 1887 the Botanical Institute and Gardens started a systematic collection of all plants present in the Piedmont Region; in 1878 the University Consortium was constituted with the Municipality, the Province of Turin and some of the neighbouring Provinces "in order to preserve the prestige of the University of Turin as one of the primary centres of university studies [in Italy and Europe]."

Museum of Human Anatomy.

At the turn of the century some of the science institutes moved to the Valentino area and vacated the old buildings in via Cavour and via Po. The teaching and research activities of physics, chemistry, pharmacology, physiology, general pathology, human anatomy, pathological anatomy and forensic medicine were relocated to purpose-built facilities. Significant results were reached in the following years both in scientific research and in the organization of teaching.

In 1893 the foundation of the Laboratory of Political Economy connected to the university and the Industrial Museum marked a further feat beyond the scientific sphere.

In the Humanities, Arturo Graf, a "European Turinese", deserves special mention.

=== 20th century and beyond ===
Faculty of Economics.

The 20th century saw the institution of the first Italian chair of psychology, held by Friedrich Kiesow in 1905, the foundation of the Institute of the History of Mediaeval and Modern Art in 1907 and that of Archaeology in 1908. In 1906 the Regia Scuola Superiore di Studi Applicati al Commercio (the Royal School of Applied Studies in Commerce) commenced its courses. In 1935, this early nucleus became the fully-fledged Faculty of Economics, together with the Faculty of Agriculture.

At the turn of the century, a branch of the university formed the first nucleus of the Polytechnic under the guidance of Galileo Ferraris. In the same period Giuseppe Peano taught at the Faculty of Sciences.

Last century, the Letters Faculty could claim staff such as Umberto Eco, Luigi Pareyson, Nicola Abbagnano, Massimo Mila, Lionello Venturi and Franco Venturi. Luigi Einaudi and Norberto Bobbio taught in the Law Faculty. The Gentile Reform of 1923 officially recognized 21 universities in Italy; Turin was included among the 10 State universities directly managed and funded by the State but were independent as regards administration and teaching, as far as the law allowed, and supervised by the National Education Ministry.

In the 1930s, Giuseppe Levi trained Salvador Luria, Renato Dulbecco and Rita Levi-Montalcini, each of whom went on to win the Nobel Prize in Medicine or Physiology (after emigrating to the United States).

Many of the protagonists of Italian political and social life in the 20th century, such as Antonio Gramsci and Piero Gobetti, Palmiro Togliatti and Massimo Bontempelli, graduated from Turin University. With its wide variety of subjects, the University of Turin has always maintained a characteristic cultural imprint made up of rigour and independence in teaching, and a spirit of service and openness to European culture.

In recent years, research workers, both in the humanities and in natural sciences, have turned their attention to nations in the southern hemisphere. Furthermore, some departments are involved in integrated research and co-operation in line with EU universities and with universities in developing countries. The school of management and economics is among the leading institutions in the country.

== Organization ==
=== Legal status, academic policies, and rankings ===
The current organization of the university system is based on Law 168/89, which set up the Ministero dell'Università e della Ricerca Scientifica e Tecnologica (Ministry for the Universities and Scientific and Technological Research) and ordered a number of provisions aimed at granting greater autonomy in university administration, and in the structure of research, teaching and organization.

One of the University's buildings: Palazzo Campana.

The objective of the subsequent 1999 University reform was to make the Italian tertiary education system comply with the model defined by the European agreements of the Sorbonne and of Bologna. The teaching reform was implemented at the University of Turin with the development and expansion of the provisions of law. Above all applied to vocational guidance, seen as a strategic link between high school and university education, where professional training must not be given preference over the education of citizens, and of the cultivated individual as valuable per se.

University rankings

Global – Overall
- ARWU World: 201–300
- QS World: 408 (2026)
- THE World: 401–500
- USNWR Global: 221

The University of Turin has chosen research as its top priority: both fundamental and business-oriented research that blends skills pertaining to:

- National and international research
- Technological transfer (spin off, patents)
- Relations with local business and with the territory
- Commissioned research
- Various projects (EU structural funds, etc.)

In 2017, the University of Turin was ranked among the best 500 universities in the world by Times Higher Education. It also placed in the 551–600 bracket in QS world university rankings.

=== Cooperation and internationalization projects ===
At the international level, the University of Turin is oriented both to relations with major organizations and to collaboration with developing countries. In the former field, relations with United Nations Agencies have been stepped up, above all with those already operating in Turin: the ILO International Training Centre through the Turin School of Development, UNICRI and UNSSC.

Courses have been organized or sponsored by the university together with the Turin School of Development for some time now, e.g. the Master of Law (LL.M.) in International Trade Law, the Master of Law (LL.M.) in Intellectual Property (within the Faculty of Law, the Master in Management of Development, the master in Applied Labour Economics for Development, master in Public Procurement Management for Sustainable Development, the master in World Heritage at work, the master in Occupational Safety and Health in the Workplace, as well as the advanced course in Diplomatic and International Studies.

There are also research and teaching agreements with South American nations, using distance learning aids and short intensive exchange programmes for teaching staff and students.

France partnered with the University of Turin to set up the Italo-French University (UIF) between 1998 and 2000. This Agency is dedicated to establishing all possible forms of collaboration between France and Italy in the area of university teaching, scientific research, and culture in general. UIF is involved in the project of the construction of a "Europe of Learning." Reflecting its raised status, UNITO has been ranked as one of the top universities in Italy, as well as a leading research university in Europe.

=== Reorganization and undergoing projects ===
The University of Turin is engaged not only in redesigning its teaching structure but also in a ten-year construction project to reorganize its premises; work is already underway on refurbishing and rationalizing existing buildings, and on newly acquired property.

Among the projects already completed is the new site at Grugliasco, which houses the Faculties of Veterinary Medicine and Agriculture. Worth mentioning too are the sites of the ex-Italgas works (now Palazzina Luigi Einaudi, already assigned to the Faculties of Law and Political Science for teaching purposes), and the ex-Manifattura Tabacchi; construction of the new Scuola di Biotecnologie; realization at the Centro Pier della Francesca of new laboratories, classrooms and student common rooms for the Computer Science Department, and finally, construction of a new building for teaching purposes at the Ospedale San Luigi, Orbassano.

Since 2001/2002 the Faculties of Political Science and Law have been running a three-year course and a master's programme in Co-operation in Development and Peace-keeping.

== Campuses ==
=== Main campus in Turin ===
Emporium, the University of Turin's store and gift shop

The university is divided into 55 departments that are located in 13 faculties:

- Faculty of Agriculture
- Faculty of Economics
- Faculty of Education
- Faculty of Foreign Languages and Literature
- Faculty of Law Homepage
- Faculty of Letters and Philosophy
- Faculty of Mathematical, Physics and Natural Sciences
- Faculty of Medicine and Surgery
- Second Faculty of Medicine and Surgery "St. Luigi Gonzaga"
- Faculty of Pharmacy
- Faculty of Political Sciences
- Faculty of Psychology
- Faculty of Veterinary Medicine

=== Special units ===
In addition, the university has created schools specifically devoted to certain academic fields, either alone or with partnerships with other institutions. Currently those schools are:

- Interdepartmental University School in Strategic Sciences (SUISS)
- The Interfaculty School for Biotechnologies
- The Interfaculty School of Motor Sciences (SUISM)
- The Interfaculty School of Strategic Studies
- The School of Business
- Centre of Advanced Studies on Contemporary China
- The Inter-university School of Specialization for secondary school teachers (SIS)
- The School of Applied Psychology
- The International School of Advanced Studies of the University of Torino (ISASUT)
- The Interuniversity Centre for Comparative Analysis of Institutions, Economics and Law
- The Center for Cognitive Science

=== Decentralized faculties ===
The university has a number of faculties outside Turin, mostly located in Piedmont. There are currently units in the fields of:

- Agriculture: in Asti, Alba, Peveragno, Saluzzo, Fossano, Verzuolo, Ormea, Sanremo
- Economics: in Asti, Pinerolo and Biella
- Pharmacology: in Savigliano
- Law: in Cuneo
- Arts and Philosophy: in Ivrea and Biella
- Medicine and Surgery: in Orbassano, Cuneo and Aosta
- Veterinary Medicine: in Moretta and Asti
- Education Sciences: in Savigliano
- Political Science: in Ivrea, Cuneo, Biella

== Notable alumni and faculty ==
=== Alumni ===
As one of Italy's oldest universities, the university has a long list of notable alumni, including prime ministers, Nobel Prize winners and prominent lawyers, philosophers and writers.

==== Business ====
- Franco Bernabè, banker and CEO of Telecom Italia
- Domenico Siniscalco, vice chairman Europe and country head of Morgan Stanley

==== Law ====
- Joseph de Maistre, philosopher, jurist and diplomat
- Kakai Kissinger, human rights activist, lawyer
- Ugo Mattei, law professor
- Lidia Poët, first female Italian advocate
- Gianni Agnelli, former head of FIAT

==== Literature ====
- Italo Calvino, journalist and writer
- Giacomo Debenedetti, writer and literary critic
- Hector Abad Faciolince, writer and journalist
- Giuseppe Giacosa, librettist, poet, playwright
- Natalia Ginzburg, writer, anti-fascist activist, and politician
- Primo Levi, chemist, essayist, writer and survivor of the Holocaust
- Claudio Magris, writer and novelist
- Laura Mancinelli, writer, novelist and translator
- Cesare Pavese, literary critic, poet, novelist, translator
- Pitigrilli, writer and novelist

==== Philosophy and religion ====
- Desiderius Erasmus
- Joseph de Maistre, philosopher, jurist and diplomat
- Umberto Eco, philosopher
- Lorenzo Ferrero, composer, librettist and author
- Ermis Segatti, Catholic priest
- Gianni Vattimo, philosopher, former MEP

==== Politics ====
- Francis Atwoli, Kenyan Trade Unionist who is currently serving as the secretary-general of the Central Organization of Trade Unions (COTU)
- Eustace Chapuys, diplomat, ambassador
- Luigi Einaudi, 2nd president of the Italian Republic
- Giovanni Giolitti, former prime minister of Italy
- Antonio Gramsci, politician, philosopher, founder of the Communist Party of Italy
- Luigi Federico, conte Menabrea, former prime minister of Italy
- Augusta Montaruli, Italian politician
- Giuseppe Saragat, 5th president of Italy
- Domenico Siniscalco, Minister of Economy and Finance (2004–05)
- Clemente Solaro, Count La Margherita, diplomat and statesman
- Palmiro Togliatti, politician, Italian Minister of Justice from 21 June 1945 to 1 July 1946, and General Secretary of the Italian Communist Party from 1927 to 1964.

==== Sciences ====
- Angelo Battelli, physicist
- Pietro Biginelli, chemist, discovered the Biginelli reaction
- Renato Dulbecco, virologist and winner of the 1975 Nobel Prize in Physiology or Medicine
- Ugo Fano, physicist
- Paolo Giubellino, physicist
- Beppo Levi, mathematician
- Rita Levi-Montalcini, neurologist and joint winner of the 1986 Nobel Prize in Physiology or Medicine
- Salvador Luria, bacteriologist and joint winner of the 1969 Nobel Prize in Physiology or Medicine
- Giuseppe Peano, founder of mathematical logic and set theory
- Tullio Regge, physicist
- Maria Grazia Roncarolo, George D. Smith Professor in Stem Cell and Regenerative Medicine and Professor of Medicine at Stanford University
- Ruggero Santilli, physicist
- Piero Scaruffi, mathematician, cognitive scientist
- Corrado Segre, mathematician
- Francesco Severi, mathematician
- Davide Vione, chemist
- Edoardo Weber, engineer, inventor of the Weber carburetor
- Gian Carlo Wick, physicist

==== Other ====
- Annalisa, singer, songwriter
- Carla Bazzanella, linguist
- Giorgio Chiellini, footballer
- Costanza Costantino (1913–1992), economist, professor of public finance and of transport economics
- Noemi Gabrielli (1901–1979), Italian art historian, superintendent, and a museologist
- Piero Gobetti, intellectual, politician, journalist
- Giovanni Palatucci, police officer who was honoured as one of the Righteous Among the Nations
- Willie Peyote, rapper, singer, songwriter
- Namik Resuli, Albanian linguist and academic, one of the founders of the Royal Institute of the Albanian Studies
- Fernando de Rosa, law student, attempted to assassinate Umberto II
- Silvia Semenzin, activist, author, scholar
- Piero Sraffa, influential economist, founder of the neo-Ricardian school of economics
- Marco Travaglio, journalist known for opposing Silvio Berlusconi
- Raf Vallone, lawyer, footballer, actor, film and drama critic
- Renzo Videsott, veterinarian, alpinist and conservationist

=== Faculty ===
- Amedeo Avogadro, physicist and namesake of Avogadro's law, appointed professor
- Carbo Sebastiano Berardi, former prefect of the Faculty of Law and scholar
- Norberto Bobbio, philosopher of law, lecturer and professor
- Elsa Fornero, politician, lectured economics
- Carlo Franzinetti, chair of particle physics from 1966 to 1980
- Mario Monti, Prime Minister of Italy, lectured economics from 1970 to 1985
- Gaetano Mosca, political scientist, chair of constitutional law at the Faculty of Law from 1896 to 1924
- Franco Reviglio, former minister of the Amato I Cabinet, appointed professor of economics
- Alessandro Riberi, noted physician and surgeon
- Enrico di Robilant, philosopher of law
- Rodolfo Sacco, professor of law, current professor emeritus at the Faculty of Law
- Loredana Sciolla, professor emeritus of sociology
- Gustavo Zagrebelsky, constitutional judge and former President of the Constitutional Court of Italy, professor of law and lecturer

== Points of interest ==
- Orto Botanico dell'Università di Torino, the university's botanical garden

== See also ==
- Turin
- Turin Museum of Natural History
- List of Italian universities
- List of medieval universities
- ICoN Interuniversity Consortium for Italian Studies
- Collegio Carlo Alberto, Moncalieri
- Rendiconti del Seminario Matematico Università e Politecnico di Torino
- Piemonte Agency for Investments, Export and Tourism
- Turin School of Development
- Faculty of Law
