= Pietro Biginelli =

Italian chemist

- Born: 25 July 1860; Palazzolo Vercellese, Piedmont-Sardinia
- Died: 15 January 1937 (aged 76); Rome, Italy
- Education: University of Turin
- Known for: Biginelli reaction
- Scientific career
- Fields: organic chemistry
- Workplaces: University of Florence
- Doctoral advisor: Icilio Guareschi

Pietro Biginelli (25 July 1860 – 15 January 1937) was an Italian chemist, who discovered a three-component reaction between urea, acetoacetic ester and aldehydes (Biginelli reaction). He also studied various aspects of sanitation chemistry and chemical products' quality control.

== Biography ==
Biginelli is born on 25 July 1860 in Palazzolo Vercellese which was back then the Kingdom of Piedmont-Sardinia. He attended the University of Turin, studying under Icilio Guareschi, a well-known Italian chemist and chemistry historian. In 1885, he was already a 4th-year student.

By 1891, Biginelli worked at the chemical laboratory at the University of Florence, where 2 years later he developed a method which later would be known as Biginelli Pyrimidine synthesis. In 1897, he was already in Rome, as a privatdozent.

In 1901, Biginelli, as coadjutor, moved to the Chemical Laboratory of State Medicine in Rome, where he was working as an assistant of Bartolomeo Gosio, a chemist known for his discovery of arsenic-containing volatile gas known as "Gosio gas". From 1925 to 1928, Biginelli worked as a director of the above-mentioned chemical laboratory.

He died in Rome on 15 January 1937.

== Scientific interests ==
Biginelli's first known scientific work, in which he was a co-author of his mentor Icilio Guareschi, was focused on synthesis and reactivity of chlorobromonaphthalene. Already in the University of Florence, Biginelli described a three-component reaction between urea, aldehyde, and ethyl acetoacetate, which was at first incorrectly interpreted as one leading to the formation of alpha-benzuramido-crotonacetic ester, or ethyl-alpha-salicyluramido-crotonate with open-chain acyclic structures. However, later he corrected himself this interpretation and expanded his initial studies, showing that the end products actually were pyrimidines. However, Biginelli did not change the chemical names presented earlier.

Another scope of his research interests emerged when he was assistant of Bartolomeo Gosio. At that time, it was known that certain poisonous volatile arsenic species tend to form at molds growing on wallpapers painted by arsenic-containing paints. Finally, Gosio and Biginelli succeeded in isolating and analyzing the species: when Gosio gas was passed into a solution of mercuric chloride in dilute HCl (Biginelli's solution) a crystalline precipitate was formed.

A small vial of the Gosio/Biginelli mercurichloride is to this day preserved at The Museum of the History of Medicine (Museo di Storia della Medicina) in Rome, Italy. Under the printed name "Laboratorio Batteriologico della Sanità Pubblica" is handwritten, "arsina penicillare comp. mercurico". From analysis of this material and of the gas itself it appeared that the gas was diethylarsine. Later, however, it was found that gas discovered by Gosio and Biginelli was in fact trimethylarsine.

Biginelli stated in 1911 that tannin has the formula C_{41}H_{32}O_{25} and that it was probably a glucoside. These conclusions were based on the property shown by tannin of forming additive products with water, alcohol, and ether, (which are stable even in vacuum) and also on the loss of carbon dioxide and water with formation of hexa-hydroxy-benzophenone, when tannin is heated in aqueous solution with lead dioxide (the amount of carbon dioxide liberated was estimated).

In 1914, Biginelli showed that aristoquinine and quinine carbonate placed in market by Bayer and Zimmer in 1898 were not the salts of carbonic acid, that true quinine carbonate is very bitter, that their action on the organism is slight and slow compared with that of quinine, and that euquinine is ethyl quinine carboxylate, C_{20}H_{23}O_{2}N_{2} ·COOC_{2}H_{5}, and aristochin, carbonylquinine, (C_{20}H_{23}O_{2}N_{2} ) _{2}CO.

After leaving his post as a director of the Chemical Laboratory of State Medicine, Biginelli, as he himself stated, focused mainly on the problems of chemical commodity research, e.g. distinguishing between true and false tannates of commercial quinine, artificial tannins, etc.
