= Seth Kuka Panyako =

Seth Panyako
- Born: 5 May 1985 (age 41)
- Citizenship: Kenya
- Education: University of Eastern Africa, Baraton
- Occupations: Trade Unionist nurse politician
- Years active: 2013 - present
- Title: General Secretary of the KNUNM

Seth Kuka Panyako is a Kenyan nurse, trade unionist and politician, who is a member of the UDA party. He hails from Kakamega County. After graduating from the University of East Africa, Baraton, with a Bachelor of Sccience in Nursing, Payako worked at the Kenyatta National Hospital, for several years, when he became active in trade union actitives. This culminated in him assuming the position of General Secretary of the Kenya National Union of Nurses and Midwives. In 2021, he and the KNUM were blocked from participation in COTU executive elections, where Francis Atwoli was re-elected for a 5th term as secretary general. He has run for Member of the National Assembly for Malava Constituency on two occasions. Firstly during the 2022 General Elections, after being appointed as a party official, the UDA Party. Then in 2025, when the seat fell vacant, he contested the by-election on a DAP-Kenya ticket. He has also served as a board member of the Local Authorities Provident Fund, from 2023 to the revocation of his appointment in 2026
