= Chelidonic acid =

Names
- Preferred IUPAC name 4-Oxo-4H-pyran-2,6-dicarboxylic acid
- Other names Jerva acid; Jervaic acid; Jervasic acid; γ-Pyrone-2,6-dicarboxylic acid

Identifiers
| CAS Number | 99-32-1 |
| 3D model (JSmol) | Interactive image |
| ChemSpider | 7153 |
| ECHA InfoCard | 100.002.499 |
| PubChem CID | 7431 |
| UNII | T33U4W5K6O |
| CompTox Dashboard (EPA) | DTXSID30243928 |
- InChI: InChI=1S/C7H4O6/c8-3-1-4(6(9)10)13-5(2-3)7(11)12/h1-2H,(H,9,10)(H,11,12) Key: PBAYDYUZOSNJGU-UHFFFAOYSA-N; InChI=1/C7H4O6/c8-3-1-4(6(9)10)13-5(2-3)7(11)12/h1-2H,(H,9,10)(H,11,12) Key: PBAYDYUZOSNJGU-UHFFFAOYAH
- SMILES: O=C\1/C=C(\O/C(C(=O)O)=C/1)C(=O)O

Properties
| Chemical formula | C_{7}H_{4}O_{6} |
| Molar mass | 184.103 g·mol^{−1} |
| Melting point | 257 °C (495 °F; 530 K) (decomposes) |

Related compounds
| Related compounds | Meconic acid |
- Except where otherwise noted, data are given for materials in their standard state (at 25 °C [77 °F], 100 kPa). Infobox references

Chelidonic acid is a heterocyclic organic acid with a pyran skeleton.

== Preparation ==
Chelidonic acid can be prepared in two steps from diethyl oxalate and acetone:

== Uses ==
Chelidonic acid is used to synthesize 4-pyrone via thermal decarboxylation.

Chelidonic acid is one of the most potent inhibitors of glutamate decarboxylase known in vitro, and is thus used in research purpose.

== Natural occurrence ==
Joseph M. A. Probst (1812–1842) discovered the acid in extracts of Chelidonium majus in 1839, and it was first studied by Joseph Udo Lerch (1816–1892) in 1846. It occurs naturally in plants of the Asparagales order. Potassium chelidonate has been found to be responsible for nyctinasty in some plants; specifically, it has been found to regulate the closing of leaves of Cassia mimosoides at nightfall.

== See also ==
- Dimethyl oxalate
- Dehydroacetic acid
