= 2-hydroxypyridine 5-monooxygenase =

Class of enzymes

Identifiers
- EC no.: 1.14.99.26
- CAS no.: 96779-45-2

Databases
- IntEnz: IntEnz view
- BRENDA: BRENDA entry
- ExPASy: NiceZyme view
- KEGG: KEGG entry
- MetaCyc: metabolic pathway
- PRIAM: profile
- PDB structures: RCSB PDB PDBe PDBsum
- Gene Ontology: AmiGO / QuickGO
Search
- PMC: articles
- PubMed: articles
- NCBI: proteins

2-hydroxypyridine 5-monooxygenase (EC 1.14.99.26) is an enzyme that catalyzes the chemical reaction

2-Pyridone
+ reduced
acceptor
O_{2}
H_{2}O
2,5-Dihydroxypyridine
+ electron
acceptor

The three substrates of this enzyme are 2-hydroxypyridine (2-pyridone), a reduced electron acceptor, and oxygen. Its products are 2,5-dihydroxypyridine, the electron acceptor, and water.

This enzyme is an oxidoreductase, that uses molecular oxygen as oxidant. The systematic name of this enzyme class is 2-hydroxypyridine,hydrogen-donor:oxygen oxidoreductase (5-hydroxylating). This enzyme is also called 2-hydroxypyridine oxygenase.
