= Kenya National Union of Nurses and Midwives =

KNUNM
- Kenya National Union of Nurses and Midwives
- For Unity, Protection & Empowerment
- Founded: 2011
- Headquarters: Nairobi, Kenya
- Location: Kenya
- Members: 29,000
- Key people: Joseph Ngwasi; Seth Panyako; Ann Githong'o; Purity Matuu
- Website: knun.or.ke

The Kenya National Union of Nurses and Midwives (KNUNM) is a Kenyan trade union established to represent Registered Nurses, Midwives, Community Health Nurses and allied workers. It was founded in 2011 and recognized in 2013 under the Labour Relations Act of 2007 to represent nurses in labour negotiations with public and private institutions. The Union was barred from participating in the Central Organization of Trade Unions (COTU), in 2021, due to a dispute between COTU Secretary General Francis Atwoli and KNUNM General Secretary Seth Panyako
