= Stizolobic acid =

Names
- IUPAC name 4-[(2S)-2-amino-3-hydroxy-3-oxo-propyl]-6-oxo-pyran-2-carboxylic acid
- Systematic IUPAC name 4-[(2S)-2-amino-3-hydroxy-3-oxo-propyl]-6-oxo-pyran-2-carboxylic acid

Identifiers
CAS Number	15911-87-2
3D model (JSmol)	Interactive image
ChemSpider	141574
KEGG	C06047
PubChem CID	161158
UNII	QXP0P9096P
CompTox Dashboard (EPA)	DTXSID90166588
- InChI: InChI=1/C9H9NO6/c10-5(8(12)13)1-4-2-6(9(14)15)16-7(11)3-4/h2-3,5H,1,10H2,(H,12,13)(H,14,15)/t5-/m0/s1
- SMILES: c1c(cc(=O)oc1C(=O)O)C[C@@H](C(=O)O)N

Properties
Chemical formula	C_{9}H_{9}NO_{6}
Molar mass	227.172 g·mol^{−1}
Density	1.604 g/cm3
Melting point	304.65 °C (580.37 °F; 577.80 K)
Boiling point	528.25 °C (982.85 °F; 801.40 K) at 760 mmHg
Solubility in water	2.634e+005 mg/L
Vapor pressure	1.44E-12 mmHg

Hazards
Flash point	273.2 °C (523.8 °F; 546.3 K)

Related compounds
Other anions	stizolobinic acid
- Except where otherwise noted, data are given for materials in their standard state (at 25 °C [77 °F], 100 kPa). Infobox references

Stizolobic acid is an amino acid found in the sap epicotyl tips of etiolated seedlings of Stizolobium hassjoo - Mucuna pruriens.

== Biosynthesis ==
Stizolobium hassjoo contains the enzyme stizolobate synthase which catalyzes the conversion of L-DOPA into stizolobic acid in the presence of oxidised nicotinamide adenine dinucleotide as a cofactor, under aerobic conditions.

L-DOPA
O_{2}
4-(L-alanin-3-yl)-2-hydroxy-cis,cis-muconate 6-semialdehyde

The initial product is 4-(L-alanin-3-yl)-2-hydroxy-cis,cis-muconate 6-semialdehyde.

The intermediate readily cyclises and further oxidises, forming a 2-pyrone ring; this is stizolobic acid, which is the product that is isolated and after which this enzyme is named.

intermediate
+ NAD^{+}
stizolobic acid
+ NADH

Stizolobinic acid

A separate enzyme, stizolobinate synthase also present in higher plants cleaves L-DOPA in a way which produces the isomeric compound, stizolobinic acid.
