= 4-Pyrone =

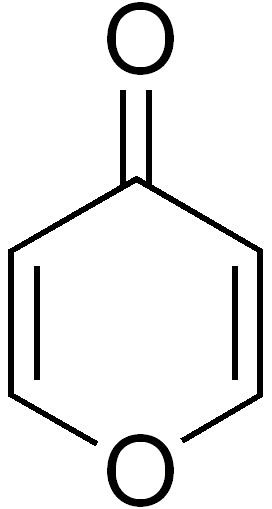

Names
- Preferred IUPAC name 4H-Pyran-4-one
- Other names γ-Pyrone; 4-Pyranone

Identifiers
CAS Number	108-97-4
3D model (JSmol)	Interactive image; Interactive image
ChEBI	CHEBI:37966
ChemSpider	7680
ECHA InfoCard	100.003.305
PubChem CID	7968
UNII	UJ7X07IM7Z
CompTox Dashboard (EPA)	DTXSID20148352
- InChI: InChI=1S/C5H4O2/c6-5-1-3-7-4-2-5/h1-4H Key: CVQUWLDCFXOXEN-UHFFFAOYSA-N; InChI=1/C5H4O2/c6-5-1-3-7-4-2-5/h1-4H Key: CVQUWLDCFXOXEN-UHFFFAOYAG
- SMILES: C1=COC=CC1=O; O=C\1/C=C\O/C=C/1

Properties
Chemical formula	C_{5}H_{4}O_{2}
Molar mass	96.08
Melting point	32 to 34 °C (90 to 93 °F; 305 to 307 K)
Boiling point	210 to 215 °C (410 to 419 °F; 483 to 488 K)

Hazards
Flash point	101 °C (214 °F; 374 K)
- Except where otherwise noted, data are given for materials in their standard state (at 25 °C [77 °F], 100 kPa). verify (what is ?) Infobox references

4-Pyrone (γ-pyrone or pyran-4-one) is an unsaturated cyclic chemical compound with the molecular formula C_{5}H_{4}O_{2}.It is isomeric with 2-pyrone.

== Preparation ==
4-Pyrone is prepared via the thermal decarboxylation of chelidonic acid.

== Reactions ==
4-Pyrone and its derivatives react with amines in protic solvents to form 4-Pyridones.

== Derivatives ==
4-Pyrone forms the central core of several natural chemical compounds, including maltol, meconic acid, kojic acid, and of the important class of the flavones.

Maltol	Kojic acid

== See also ==
- Pyrone
- 4-Pyridone
- Dehydroacetic acid
