= Stizolobate synthase =

Identifiers
- EC no.: 1.13.11.29
- CAS no.: 65979-39-7

Databases
- IntEnz: IntEnz view
- BRENDA: BRENDA entry
- ExPASy: NiceZyme view
- KEGG: KEGG entry
- MetaCyc: metabolic pathway
- PRIAM: profile
- PDB structures: RCSB PDB PDBe PDBsum
- Gene Ontology: AmiGO / QuickGO
Search
- PMC: articles
- PubMed: articles
- NCBI: proteins

Stizolobate synthase (EC 1.13.11.29) is an enzyme that catalyzes the chemical reaction

L-DOPA
O_{2}
4-(L-alanin-3-yl)-2-hydroxy-cis,cis-muconate 6-semialdehyde

The two substrates of this enzyme are L-DOPA and oxygen. Its initial product is 4-(L-alanin-3-yl)-2-hydroxy-cis,cis-muconate 6-semialdehyde.

The intermediate readily cyclises and further oxidises, forming a 2-pyrone ring; this stizolobic acid, which is the product that is isolated and after which this enzyme is named.

intermediate
+ NAD^{+}
stizolobic acid
+ NADH

The oxidation step uses oxidised nicotinamide adenine dinucleotide as a cofactor and the enzyme also requires zinc. It belongs to the family of oxidoreductases, specifically those acting on single donors with O_{2} as oxidant and incorporation of two atoms of oxygen into the substrate (oxygenases). The oxygen incorporated need not be derived from O_{2}. The systematic name of this enzyme class is 3,4-dihydroxy-L-phenylalanine:oxygen 4,5-oxidoreductase (recyclizing). It participates in tyrosine metabolism.

Stizolobinic acid

A separate enzyme, stizolobinate synthase also present in higher plants cleaves L-DOPA in a way which produces the isomeric compound, stizolobinic acid.
