= Gostatin =

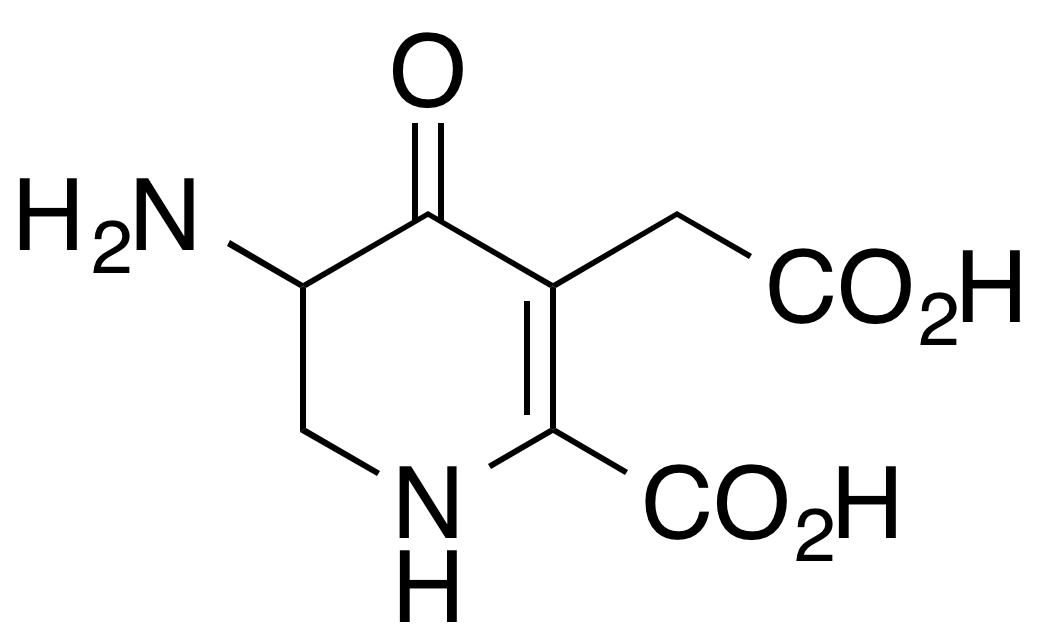

Names
- IUPAC name 3-Amino-5-(carboxymethyl)-4-oxo-2,3-dihydro-1H-pyridine-6-carboxylic acid

Identifiers
CAS Number	78416-84-9
3D model (JSmol)	Interactive image
ChemSpider	91339
PubChem CID	101100
UNII	GNH8A5TAQ0
- InChI: InChI=UXFJYSFCCBPXED-UHFFFAOYSA-N Key: 1S/C8H10N2O5/c9-4-2-10-6(8(14)15)3(7(4)13)1-5(11)12/h4,10H,1-2,9H2,(H,11,12)(H,14,15)
- SMILES: C1C(C(=O)C(=C(N1)C(=O)O)CC(=O)O)N

Properties
Chemical formula	C_{8}H_{10}N_{2}O_{5}
Molar mass	214.177 g·mol^{−1}
- Except where otherwise noted, data are given for materials in their standard state (at 25 °C [77 °F], 100 kPa). Infobox references

Gostatin is an irreversible inhibitor of the aspartate aminotransferase produced by the bacterium Streptomyces sumanensis. Its structure is a dihydro-4-pyridone analog of glutamic acid.
