= Icilio Guareschi =

Italian chemist (1847–1918)

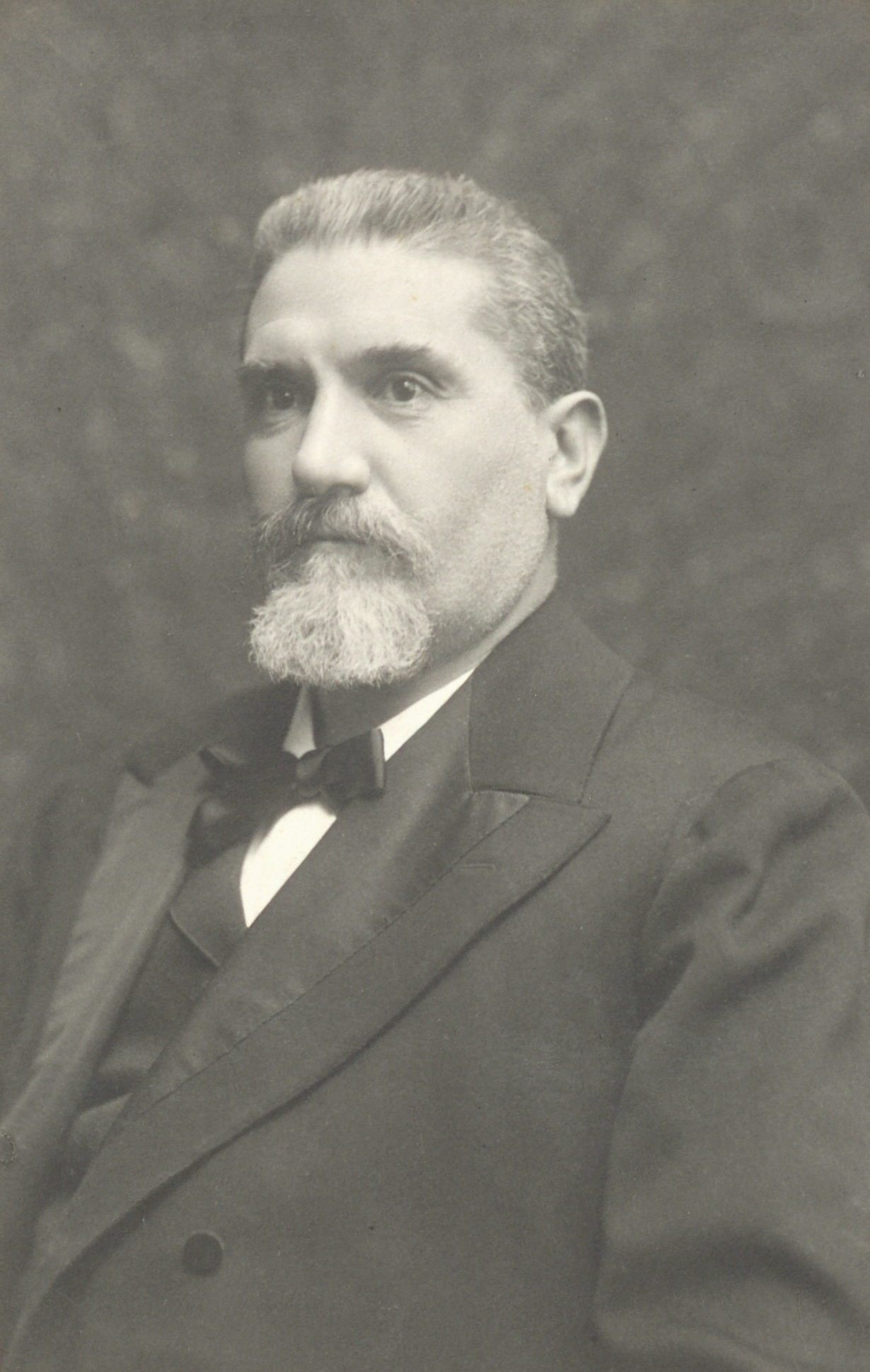
- Portrait of Icilio Guareschi, was an Italian chemist.
- Born: 24 December 1847; San Secondo Parmense, Duchy of Parma and Piacenza
- Died: 20 June 1918 (aged 70); Turin, Kingdom of Italy
- Education: University of Bologna
- Known for: Guareschi-Thorpe condensation
- Scientific career
- Fields: Organic chemistry
- Workplaces: University of Siena; University of Turin

Icilio Guareschi (Italian pronunciation: [iˈtʃiːljo ɡwaˈreski]; 24 December 1847 – 20 June 1918) was an Italian chemist.

== Life and career ==
Icilio Guareschi studied at the University of Bologna and received his Ph.D there in 1871. He became professor at the University of Siena and in 1879 at the University of Turin, where he worked until his death in 1918.

Guareschi worked in the field of organic chemistry, pharmacy, toxicology and the history and chemistry. In 1894, he discovered a reaction to synthesise 2-Pyridones, today known as the Guareschi-Thorpe condensation.

== Bibliography ==
- "ICILIO GUARESCHI". contradatrinitas.it (in Italian). Archived from the original on 2007-08-22.
