= Kenya Union of Post Primary Education Teachers =

KUPPET
- Kenya Union of Post Primary Education Teachers
- Founded: 1993
- Headquarters: Nairobi, Kenya
- Location: Kenya
- Key people: Hon. Omboko Milemba; Akelo Misori; Wicks Njenga
- Affiliations: COTU
- Website: https://kuppet-kenya.org

The Kenya Union of Post Primary Education Teachers is a national trade union that respresents teaching professionals working in Junior and Secondary Schools in Kenya. It was founded in 1993, as a breakaway union from the Kenya National Union of Teachers, and formally registered, as the representative of post-primary teachers in 2002. It complements the work of KNUT by focusing on matters that are unique to teachers outside of primary school settings.
