= Ermis Segatti =

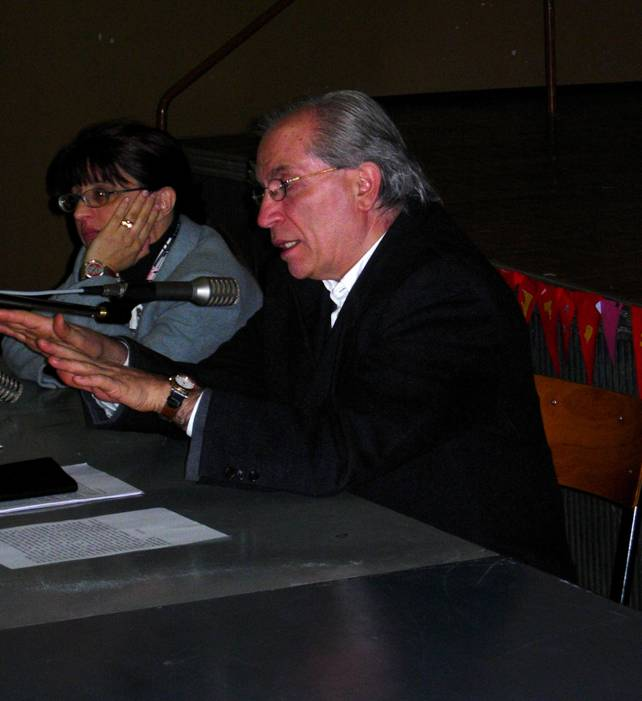
- Prof. Segatti presenting a paper at a Convention
- Born: 24 November 1937 (age 88); Pianezza, Italy
- Education: University of Turin
- Known for: Scholarship and publications
- Scientific career
- Fields: Theology, History of Christianity
- Workplaces: Theological University of Northern Italy - Turin Campus
- Doctoral advisor: Franco Bolgiani

Ermis Segatti (born 24 November 1937) is an Italian Catholic theologian and university Professor belonging to the Archdiocese of Turin, Italy.

== Biography ==
Ermis Segatti was born on 24 November 1937 in Pianezza. After completing his theological training at the Catholic Seminary of Turin, he obtained a Laurea (Master's degree) in German Literature discussing Friedrich von Spee and German Religious Poetry in the 17th century, and another one in History of Christianity, concerning Church and State Inquisitorial Trial on Magic, from the University of Turin. He is Professor of History of Christianity at the Theological University of Northern Italy - Turin Campus (Facoltà Teologica dell'Italia Settentrionale - Sezione Parallela di Torino). Until 2013 he was also a top administrator of the Archdiocese of Turin as Director of the Pastoral Office for the university and Culture.

== Work ==
Ermis Segatti is a speaker at top academic and cultural events in Italy and abroad. He's been invited to lecture and establish contacts in Eastern Europe, China, South Asia and Central America. He speaks English, French, German, Spanish, and Russian. He also taught Latin Language and Literature for many years in public high schools. Professor Segatti has written several books and many academic and non-academic articles in his fields of expertise. In the past few years he has co-organized post-graduate professional development courses for people involved with ethics and bioethics issues.

== Publications ==
Selected Books

- Analisi marxista della religione, (Marxist Analysis of Religion), Editrice UPL, Turin, (1974)
- Problemi di sociologia sovietica (1957–1962), (Problems of Soviet Sociology), Giappichelli (1975)
- L'ateismo, un problema nel marxismo, (Atheism, a Problem in Marxism), Piemme (1986)
- I cristiani e la pace, (Christians and Peace), Edizioni Gruppo Abele, Turin (1987)
- Dopo 1000 anni di cristianesimo in Russia, (After 1000 Years of Christianity in Russia), Piemme (1989)
- Anima, Viaggio nell'invisibile dell'uomo, (The Soul, Journey in the Invisible of Man), Piemme (2014)

Lectures

- Islam e Cristianesimo (Islam and Christianity), collana Per saperne di piu', Edizioni Abbazia della Novalesa(1998)
- Teologie della liberazione in America Latina (Theologies of Liberation in Latin America), collana Per saperne di piu', Edizioni Abbazia della Novalesa (1999)

Selected Articles

- Fede e scienza: ripensando Galileo, in Scienza e tecnologia: al di là dello specchio, Libri Scheiwiller, Milano (2004), pp. 217–224.
- Il Cristianesimo come ascesi nella società del welfare e del debole pensiero, in L’ascesi nel Buddhismo e nel Cristianesimo, Atti del Convegno (12 giugno 2005), Edizioni Agami (2005), pp. 93–100.
- Il primo articolo sulla Sindone nella rivista dell’ateismo scientifico sovietico, in G.M. Zaccone- G. Ghiberti, Guardare la Sindone, Studia Taurinensia, Effatà Editrice (2007), pp. 418–426.
- Alla ricerca di un volto asiatico di Gesù, in Credere oggi, XXVII, 2, (2007), pp. 41–61.
- Stati e Chiese contro Satana: inquisizioni civili e religiose contro i delitti demoniaci tra Rinascimento e Illuminismo (States and Churches against the Devil: Civil and Religious Inquisitions against Devil's Crimes between Renaissance and Enlightenment), in L'autunno del Diavolo, Vol. I, Bompiani, Milano 1990, pp. 405–433.
- 当代哲学与天主教神学 (Contemporary Philosophy and Catholic Theology), published by the Beijing Institute for the Study of Christianity and Culture (BISCC), 2015

Essays published in Archivio teologico Torinese, (Theological Journal of Turin's Theological Faculty).

- In English
- The Christological Thought of Michael Amaladoss, in Archivio Teologico Torinese,7, (2001/2), pp. 345–362.
- Neo-Platonism and Early Christian Theologies, in Archivio Teologico Torinese, 2, 2007, pp. 381– 422
- What does Augustine "acknowledge" and "recognize" in his Confessions?, 2, 2008, pp. 347–365
- Asian Christians in the First Millenium, 1, 2010, pp. 91–127
- In Italian
- Tendenze del rinnovamento teologico in India. La ricerca su Dio. I: Premesse e precursori (Trends in Indian Theological Renewal), 5, 1999/1, pp. 125–158; II: I contemporanei (The Contemporaries), 5, 1999/2, pp. 125–158
- Il dibattito cristologico nella teologia Indiana. Preamboli neo-hindu e cristiani (The Christological Debate in Indian Theology. Neo-Hindu and Christian Premises), 9, 2004/1, pp. 110–132
- Alla ricerca di un volto asiatico di Gesu (The Quest for an Asian Profile of Jesus), in Credere oggi (Believing Today), XXVII, 2, 2007, pp. 41–61
- Parlare di laicita' con altre culture: in India e in Cina (Speaking of Laicity in Other Cultures: in India and in China), 1, 2012, pp. 70–87

== See also ==
- History of Christianity
- Pontifical university

== Sources ==
- Annuario della diocesi di Torino (2005) (Yearbook of the Archdiocese of Turin)
- Official website of the Archdiocese of Turin
