= Pyridone =

Pyridone may refer to several organic compounds with the formula C_{5}H_{4}NH(O):

- 2-Pyridone
- 3-hydroxypyridine
- 4-Pyridone

These can adopt three tautomers, a oxo form, a zwitterion form, and a enol form. Whereas 2-pyridone (α) and 4-pyridone (γ) predominantly adopt the oxo form, the 3-pyridone (β) cannot, and instead adopts an equilibrium of the zwitterion form, pyridin-1-ium-3-olate, and the enol form, 3-hydroxypyridine (the canonical form). The 3-pyridone is not mesoionic. This property of 3-hydroxypyridine is leveraged in biology in pyridoxal phosphate: this common cofactor that catalyses a variety of reactions thanks to a stable cationic form.
