= Theological University of Northern Italy – Turin Campus =

Coordinates: 45.072574°N 7.685162°E

Theological University of Northern Italy-Turin Campus
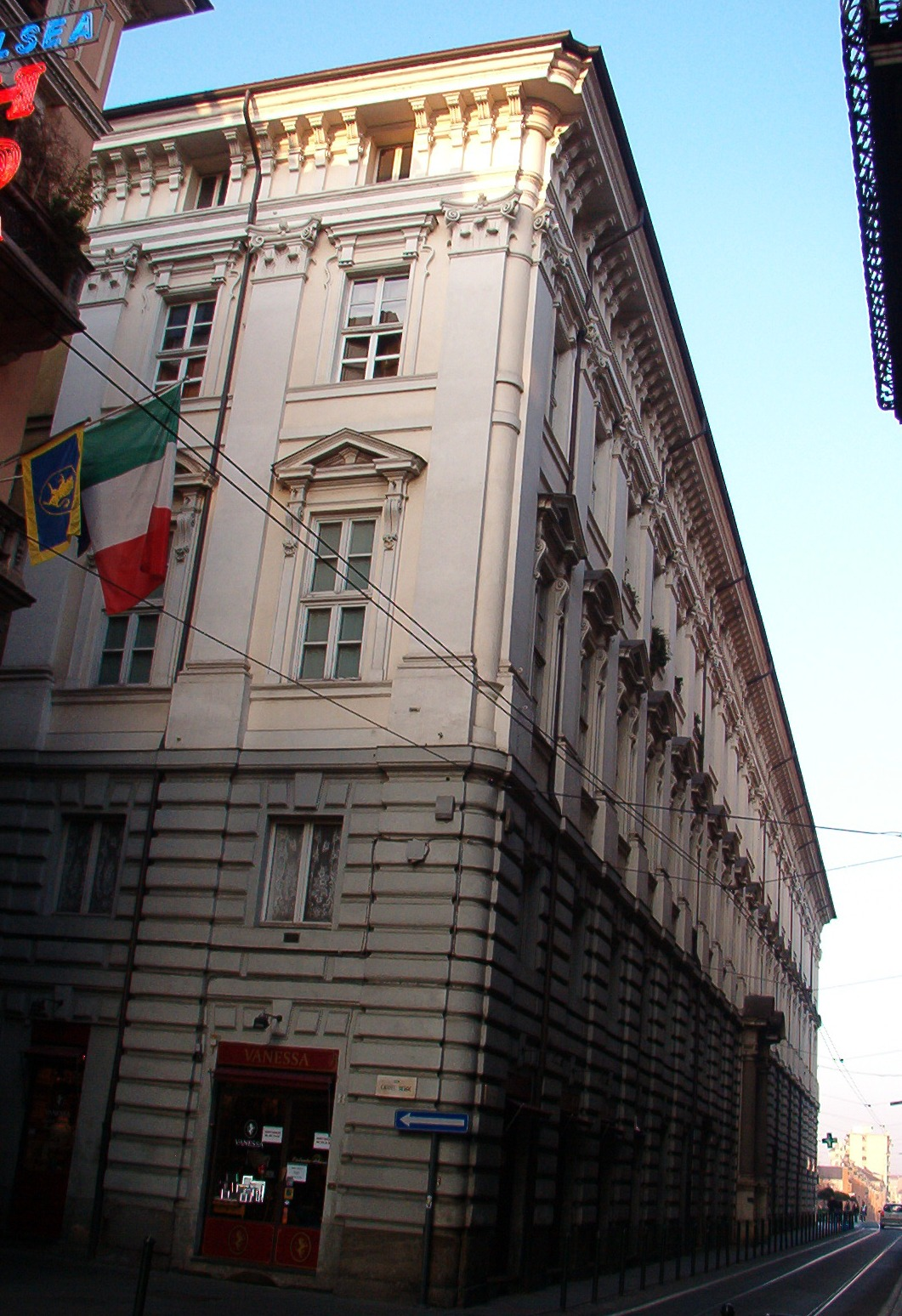
- Façade of the Palace of the Seminary, where the Turin Campus is located
- Type: Private
- Established: 1982
- Endowment: $ not available
- Dean: Giuseppe Ghiberti
- Academic staff: 43
- Administrative staff: 5
- Students: not available
- Address: Via XX Settembre 82, Turin, Italy 10100, Turin, Piedmont, Italy
- Campus: Urban
- Affiliations: Theological University of Northern Italy-Milan
- Website: Teologia Torino

The Theological University of Northern Italy is a university of the Catholic Church, and has its main campus in Milan. The administration of the university, which is also located in Milan, in the monastery annexed to the Basilica of St Simplician, is under the leadership of the Bishops of four ecclesiastical regions: Piedmont, Lombardy, Venice, and Liguria. Liguria joined the other three regions recently.

== Description ==
The Turin Campus is the Piedmont branch of the Theological University of Northern Italy. It offers academic degrees completely similar to those available in the Milan Campus, and in the other regions. Instead, the Master Program in Moral Theology is offered only in the Turin Campus, on behalf of all the affiliates of the Theological University.

The main building of the Turin Campus is the Palace of the Seminary located at 83, XX Settembre Street, close by the Cathedral of Turin, in the downtown area.

The Theological University–Turin Campus offers a B.A. and a M.A. programs.

- The B.A. is a five-year program which leads to the bachelor's degree of theology.
- The M.A. program is a two-year program with specialization in Moral Theology, social emphasis. A Master's degree of theology (or “License’’) is conferred at the conclusion of the studies.

The Theological University of Northern Italy–Turin Campus is also in charge of the supervision of the courses offered at the Higher Institute of Religious Sciences, that is also located in the same building

== List of Faculty Members ==
=== B.A. in Theology ===
AIME prof. don Oreste; BALOCCO prof. don Giovanni; CALVO prof. don Luigi; CAPELLO prof.ssa Clara; CAPETTI prof. Guido; CASTO prof. don Lucio; CERAGIOLI prof. don Ferruccio; COHA prof. don Giuseppe; COLLO prof. don Carlo; DANNA prof. don Valter; GALVAGNO prof. don Germano; GHIBERTI prof. don Giuseppe	GIACOBBE prof. Giuseppe; GIRAUDO prof. Alessandro; GRAMAGLIA prof. don Pier Angelo; MARENCO prof. Maria Rita; MO prof. don Elio; MURARO prof. padre Giordano; NEGRI prof. don Augusto; PACINI prof. don Andrea; PELLEGRINO prof. don Giuseppe; PIANO prof. Stefano; PIOLA prof. don Alberto; PRATESI prof.ssa Nelia	PROCHET prof.ssa Elena; PROVERA prof. don Roberto; QUIRICO prof.ssa Monica; REPOLE prof. don Roberto; ROSSINO don MARIO; SAVARINO prof. don Renzo; SEGATTI prof. don Ermis; TOMATIS prof. don Paolo; TUNINETTI prof. don Giuseppe; VENUTO don Francesco Saverio; ZAMUNER prof. padre Lino

=== M.A. in Moral Theology ===
BERZANO don Luigi; BONANATE prof. Luigi; CASSANO don Giampaolo; FERRARI don Piermario	GUENZI don Pierdavide; MURARO prof. padre Giordano; PERINI don Giovanni; REPOLE prof. don Roberto	ROSSINO don Mario; TRANIELLO prof. Francesco; ZAI prof. Luigi

== See also ==
- Archdiocese of Turin
