= Kenya Union of Domestic, Hotels, Educational Institutions, Hospitals and Allied Workers =

KUDHEIHA
- Kenya Union of Domestic, Hotels, Educational Institutions, Hospitals and Allied Workers
- In Pursuit of Workers Rights
- Founded: 1942
- Headquarters: Nairobi, Kenya
- Location: Kenya
- Members: 225,356
- Key people: Thomas Mboya
- Affiliations: COTU
- Website: www.kudheiha.org

The Kenya Union of Domestic, Hotels, Educational Institutions, Hospitals and Allied Workers Union is a trade union in Kenya that represents the interests of formal and informal economy workers engaged in hotels, restaurants and casinos; educational institutions; hospitals; domestic services; private homes; and churches and institutions associated with them. It began as the House Servant Association, in 1942, before being registered by the colonial government in 1951. The union has been a key negotiator for better terms for domestic workers, and casual staff in hosptiality, healthcare and domestic settings.
