= Kenyan tea workers strike of 2007 =

Labour dispute in Kenya

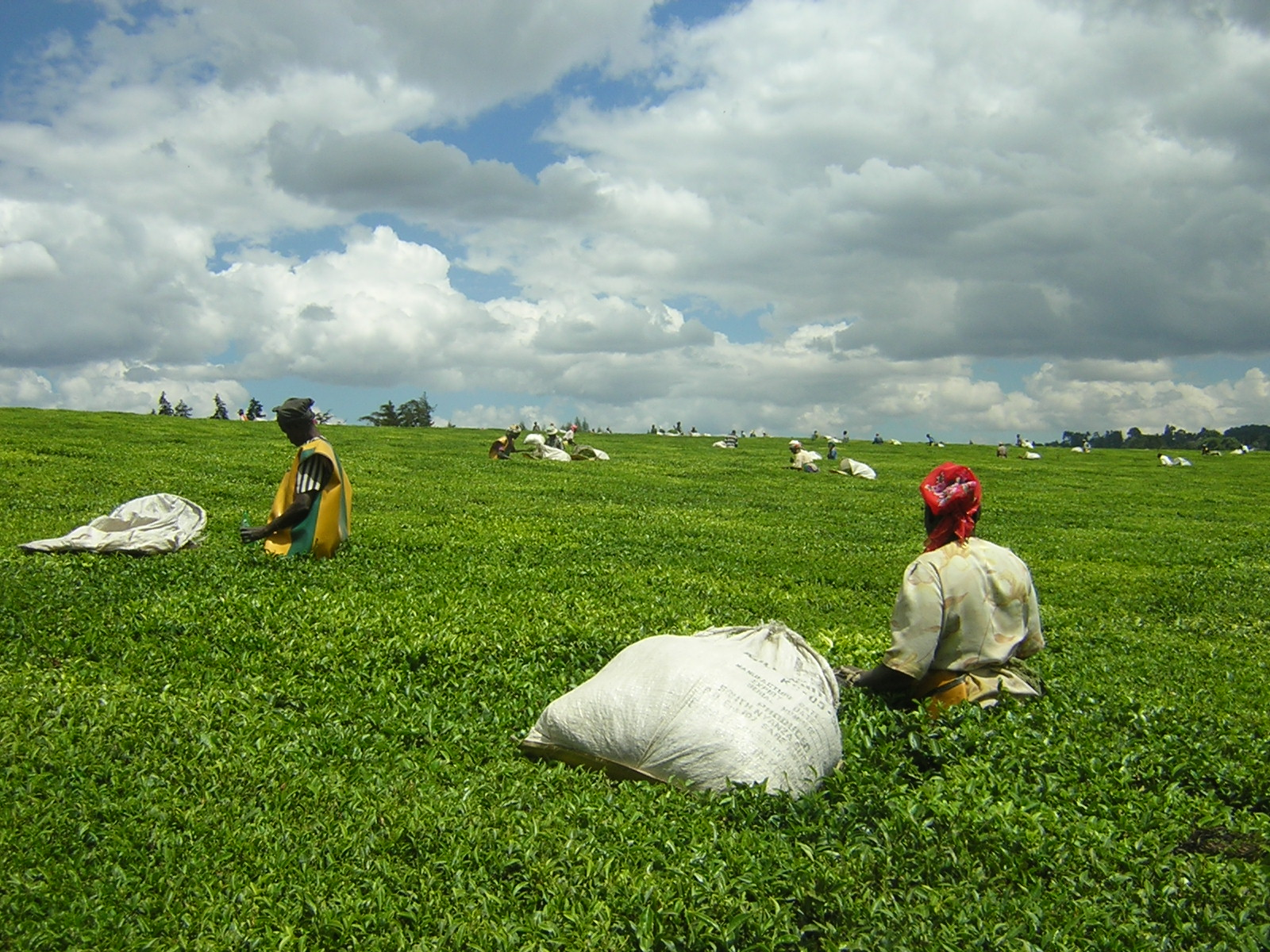
Tea plantation workers in Kenya's Kericho region.

The Kenyan tea workers strike of 2007 was a strike action undertaken by members of the Kenya Plantation and Agricultural Workers Union (KPAWU) against Unilever Tea Kenya Ltd (UTK) over a wage increase. It took place in the Kericho region of Kenya and involved an estimated 10,000 workers from eighteen tea plantations. The strike began on 8 September 2007 and ended on 14 September 2007 when UTK agreed to pay an 8% wage increase.

== Background ==
A 16% wage increase for tea plantation workers was agreed to in 2006 through a process of collective bargaining between the KPAWU and employers in the Kenyan tea industry, including UTK. By September 2007, the wage agreement had been implemented by other multinational companies, but not by UTK, which argued that wages in Kenya were already higher than in other tea-producing countries in Africa. The KPAWU announced that it would take legal action against UTK unless the wage increase was implemented by 20 September 2007.

== Strike ==
The strike began on 8 September 2007 when 10,000 KPAWU members stopped work and brought operations at eighteen plantations to a halt. The action was declared illegal by the district labour officer, but the strike continued. It is unclear as to the level of support that the strike had within the KPAWU, as the Kericho chairman asked the strikers to return to work while the issue was investigated, while the KPAWU general secretary blamed UTK's actions for the strike.

A number of violent incidents occurred during the strike. Striking workers confronted and in some cases assaulted other workers who were not part of the strike. A plantation manager's house was destroyed at one estate, and a truck was set alight at another.

On 14 September 2007, UTK announced an 8% wage increase and the strike came to an end.
