= Costanza Costantino =

Italian economist (1913–1992)

- Born: 1913; Turin, Italy
- Died: 1992 (aged 78–79)

Academic background
- Education: University of Turin

Academic work
- Discipline: Public finance, Business cycle theory
- Institutions: University of Turin

Costanza Costantino (1913–1992) was an Italian economist who worked on long-term economic fluctuations and on the relationship between taxation and the business cycle. Excluded from the University of Turin in 1938 under Italy's anti-Semitic racial laws of the time, she returned after the World War II and became a professor of economics and financial law there in 1967.

== Selected works ==
- "Sulle fluttuazioni economiche di lunga durata". Rivista Internazionale di Scienze Sociali (1939): 794–809.
- "Di alcuni aspetti del problema del lavoro femminile nel quadro della ricostruzione europea". Rivista di Politica Economica (1941): 677–684.
- "Cause e rimedi dei bassi salari femminili". Rivista Internazionale di Scienze Sociali 14 (3), May 1943: 152–160.
- Imposte e congiuntura. Turin: Giappichelli, 1951.
- "Piani di sviluppo e pubbliche finanze". Rivista Internazionale di Scienze Sociali 23 (2), March–April 1952: 156–170.
- "L'impôt italien sur le revenu global et sa sensibilité conjoncturelle". Public Finance (1952), no. 3: 259–278.
- "Gli effetti dell'imposta generale sul reddito durante il ciclo economico". Rivista Internazionale di Scienze Sociali 25 (2), March–April 1954: 133–160.
- "Finanze pubbliche in Danimarca". Rivista di Politica Economica (1956): 1123–1140.
- "Il settore dello zucchero". In Atti della Commissione parlamentare di inchiesta sui limiti posti alla concorrenza nel campo economico, vol. 7. Rome: Camera dei Deputati, 1965.
- (with M. Fanno) Elementi di scienza delle finanze. 38th ed. Turin: Lattes, 1976.
- Il sistema tributario italiano: esposizione critica. Turin: Lattes, 1981.
- Lezioni moderne di finanza pubblica. Turin: Società Editrice Internazionale, 1990.
