= Piemonte Agency for Investments, Export and Tourism =

Organization for the international promotion of Piedmont, Italy

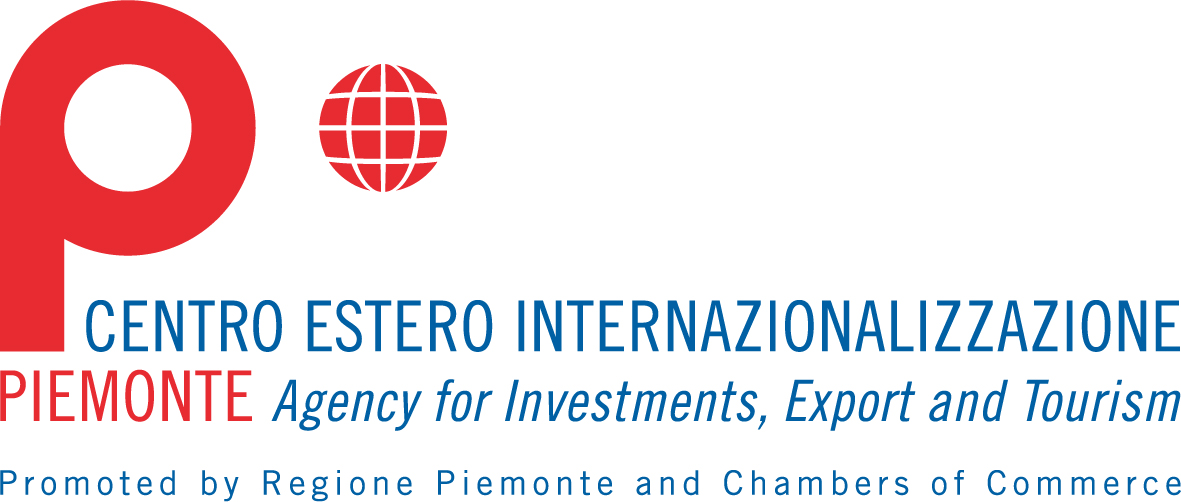
- Formation: 2006
- Legal status: Public consortium
- Headquarters: Turin, Italy
- Region served: Piemonte
- Chairperson: Dario Peirone
- Website: centroestero.org/en

The Piemonte Agency for Investments, Export and Tourism is the public body in charge of the internationalization of the Italian region of Piedmont. Its main activities and institutional goals are:

- supporting and aiding companies that want to locate in Piedmont
- matching local production offers with the needs expressed by international markets
- facilitating international promotion for Piedmontese wine, food, and specialties
- promoting the region's tourist resources in the world
- training human resources on key subjects related to international trade and commercial strategies.

== Piemonte Agency Foundation ==
The Piemonte Agency was founded in 2006 by the Union of Chambers of Commerce of Piedmont, in conjunction with business associations and the academic world, to strengthen the international role of the area and its potential. It is the first Italian institution bringing together all activities carried out by pre-existing local organizations operating for the internationalization of the territory. These activities and groups include:

- Centro Estero Camere Commercio Piemontesi (support for the international business relation development of local SMEs)
- ITP, Invest in Turin and Piedmont
- Consorzio Piemontese di Formazione (managerial training programmes on international trade for both Italians and foreigners)
- MKTP (planning and layout of location marketing strategies)
- all international activities run by IMA (Agroalimentary Marketing Institute) and by ATR (Regional Agency for Tourist Promotion).

== Members ==
Promoting members are Piedmont Regional Government and Unioncamere Piemonte (Union of Piedmont Chambers of Commerce).

Other members are: all the Chambers of Commerce of Piedmont, the Chamber of Commerce of Aosta, Piedmont Universities (Polytechnic University of Turin, University of Eastern Piedmont).

== International Network ==
The Piemonte Agency International Network is aimed at promoting the development of business between Piedmont and other nations. The network guarantees interlocutors information on the region and the opportunities it offers and encourages industrial, commercial, and technological cooperation.
