= Davide Vione =

Italian scientist

- Born: 14 October 1974 (age 52); Moncalieri, Italy
- Education: University of Torino
- Occupations: Chemist, academic and author
- Scientific career
- Fields: Environmental chemistry
- Workplaces: University of Torino

Davide Vione (born 14 October 1974) is an Italian chemist and academic. He is a professor of chemistry at the University of Torino. His research is focused on photochemistry of surface and atmospheric waters, heterogeneous photocatalysis and other advanced oxidation processes for water treatment. Vione has authored over 350 publications, has been cited over 12,000 times.

He is the author of two books: Photobiogeochemistry of Organic Matter: Principles and Practices in Water Environments, and Surface Water Photochemistry. He also developed a software, named APEX (Aqueous Photochemistry of Environmentally-occurring Xenobiotics), which predicts half-life times and phototransformation kinetics of pollutants as a function of water chemistry and depth, including the photochemical formation of intermediates.

Vione is associated to the European Association of Chemistry and the Environment, and has served as its president from 2016 and 2017.

== Education ==
Vione studied at the University of Torino, and received his master's degree in chemistry in 1998, and a Doctoral degree in chemistry in 2001, under the supervision of Ezio Pelizzetti. His Ph.D. dissertation is titled "Transformations of Aromatic Compounds in the Presence of Nitrate and Nitrite in Aqueous Systems."

== Career ==
Following his work as assistant professor from 2002 till 2011, Vione held appointment as an associate professor in the Department of Chemistry at the University of Torino in 2011, and became a professor of chemistry in 2018.

== Research ==
Vione has focused his research on photochemistry of surface and atmospheric waters, and on advanced oxidation processes for water treatment. He has been project coordinator within a Marie Curie fellowship as well as the Scientific and Technological Co-operation Agreement between Italy and Romania, and has taken part in several research projects, including PNRA - Antarctica Project, CNR - Agenzia 2000, PRIN 2003, PRIN 2007, and PRIN 2009, among others.

Vione wrote a review paper in 2015 where he discussed the role of hydroxyl radical in different environmental compartments and in laboratory systems. He also highlighted the impact of the reactivity of indoor hydroxyl radicals in terms of health and well-being as a great concern of the present time. Furthermore, he described sources and sinks of hydroxyl radicals upon irradiation of natural lake water and groundwater samples, proportionally to the nitrate levels. While demonstrating photocatalytic transformation of phenol on TiO_{2} and on TiO_{2}/F, he contributed to the determination of the usage of alcohols as a diagnostic tool for the analysis of the photocatalytic mechanism. He also investigated photodegradation processes of the antiepileptic drug carbamazepine in the context of estuarine waters, where acridine was detected as a major photodegradation intermediate of carbamazepine, and investigated the connections between photochemical reactions in surface waters and climate change.

Vione explored photonitration processes under different conditions, and determined several pathways in the formation of the aromatic nitroderivatives. He also studied Fenton-based oxidation, electro-oxidation, and homogeneous advanced oxidation processes, and discussed applications of advanced oxidation processes (AOPs) in terms of removing organics from produced water. Furthermore, his research highlights ZVI-Fenton as a suitable technique to achieve effective degradation of ibuprofen and phenol under several operational conditions. In his study, he also provided insights into mechanisms of sunlight-mediated and dark production of hydroxyl radicals in lake waters.

== Awards and honors ==
- 1998 - Award Federchimica, Italian Federation of Chemical Industries, 10th edition
- 2000 - Award Federchimica, 12th edition
- 2003 - Young Researcher Award, Italian Chemical Society
- 2003 - European Young Researcher of the Year Award, European Association of Chemistry and the Environment (ACE)
- 2017, 2020 - Excellence in Review Awards: Environmental Science & Technology, and Water Research
- 2021- Super-reviewer award, Environmental Science & Technology
- 2017 - Editorial advisory board member, Environmental Science & Technology
- Listed among the Top Italian Scientists

== Bibliography ==
=== Books ===
- Photobiogeochemistry of Organic Matter: Principles and Practices in Water Environments (2012) ISBN 9783642322235
- Surface Water Photochemistry (2015) ISBN 9781782622154

=== Selected articles ===
- Minero, C., Mariella, G., Maurino, V., Vione, D., & Pelizzetti, E. (2000). Photocatalytic transformation of organic compounds in the presence of inorganic ions. 2. Competitive reactions of phenol and alcohols on a titanium dioxide− fluoride system. Langmuir, 16(23), 8964–8972.
- Harrison, M. A., Barra, S., Borghesi, D., Vione, D., Arsene, C., & Olariu, R. I. (2005). Nitrated phenols in the atmosphere: a review. Atmospheric Environment, 39(2), 231–248.
- Vione, D., Falletti, G., Maurino, V., Minero, C., Pelizzetti, E., Malandrino, M., ... & Arsene, C. (2006). Sources and sinks of hydroxyl radicals upon irradiation of natural water samples. Environmental Science & Technology, 40(12), 3775–3781.
- Chiron, S., Minero, C., & Vione, D. (2006). Photodegradation processes of the antiepileptic drug carbamazepine, relevant to estuarine waters. Environmental science & technology, 40(19), 5977–5983.
- Gligorovski, S., Strekowski, R., Barbati, S., & Vione, D. (2015). Environmental implications of hydroxyl radicals (• OH). Chemical reviews, 115(24), 13051–13092.
