= Malava Constituency =

Electoral constituency of Kenya

Malava
- constituency for the Parliament of Kenya
- Malava Constituency within Kakamega County

- Kakamega County within Kenya
- County: Kakamega

Current constituency
- Number of members: 1
- Party: UDA
- Member of Parliament: David Athman Ndakwa
- Wards: 7

Malava Constituency is an electoral constituency in Kenya. It is one of twelve constituencies in Kakamega County. The current MP of the constituency is David Athman Ndakwa. The constituency was established for the 1988 elections.

== Electoral history ==
Elections	MP	Party	Notes
1988	Joshua Mulanda Angatia	KANU	One-party system.
1990	MN. S. Anaswa	KANU	By-elections, one party system.
1992	Joshua Mulanda Angatia	KANU	
1997	Soita Shitanda	FORD-Kenya	
2002	Soita Shitanda	NRC	
2007	Soita Shitanda	NFK	
2013	Moses Malulu Injendi	MDP	
2017	Moses Malulu Injendi	JP	
2022	Moses Malulu Injendi	ANC	Died on 17 February 2025
2025	David Athman Ndakwa	UDA	By-elections held 27 November 2025.

== Wards ==
Malava Constituency has seven wards, namely; South Kabras, Butali/Chegulo, Manda-Shivanga, Chemuche, Shirugu-Mugai, West Kabras, and East Kabras. As of 2022, there are 94,417 registered voters.

Wards
Ward	Registered Voters
Chemuche	14,139
Butali/Chegulo	15,146
Manda-Shivanga	14,677
South Kabras	16,523
Shirugu-Mugai	12,238
West Kabras	11,699
East Kabras	9,995
Total	94,417
*As of 2022

== 2025 By-election ==
A by-election was held on 27 November 2025 after the death of Moses Malulu, re-elected as MP during the 2022 general election. David Ndakwa won the by-election with 21,564 votes under a UDA ticket, ahead of DAP-K's Seth Panyako with 20,210 votes.

Criticisms of the electoral process were raised by various groups. The Election Observation Group (ELOG) raised concerns of electoral fraud involving violence, harassment, and political interference across the various by-elections held in November 2025. In Malava constituency, ELOG highlighted clashes between supporters of different political groups, and unauthorised access to polling stations by unaccredited individuals.

Members of the opposition alliance Azimio la Umoja also expressed concerns around the election result and some called for an invalidation of results. Trans-Nzoia Governor George Natembeya of the DAP-K party expressed concerns about the status of the by-election as free and fair, stating that is was characterized by voter intimidation and vote-buying. On 30 November 2025, leader of the WPF, Kalonzo Musyoka, announced plans to challenge the results of the by-election, claiming that the Government of Kenya intimidated, suppressed, and bribed voters. However, Musyoka did not end up officially challenging the election result. Two voters launched a petition to the Kakamega High Court on behalf of second-place candidate Seth Panyako to invalidate the election results on grounds of alleged violence, voter intimidation, bribery, interference by public officials. The case included footage of Higher Education Principal Secretary Beatrice Inyangala campaigning for David Ndakwa while giving out food aid. On 15 May, the High Court in Kakamega ruled against the petitioners, stating that there was insufficient evidence to nullify the by-election results.
