= Soita Shitanda =

Kenyan politician

Member of the National Assembly of Kenya
- In office 1997–2013
- Preceded by: Joshua Angatia
- Succeeded by: Malulu Injendi
- Constituency: Malava Constituency

Minister for Housing
- In office 2005–2013
- President: Mwai Kibaki

Personal details
- Born: 9 November 1958 Kenya
- Died: 24 May 2016 (aged 57) Nairobi, Kenya
- Party: New Ford Kenya
- Other political affiliations: Ford Kenya (1997) NARC (2002)
- Occupation: Politician
- Known for: Minister for Housing

Soita Shitanda (9 November 1958 – 24 May 2016) was a Kenyan politician. He belonged to New Ford Kenya and was elected to represent the Malava Constituency in the National Assembly of Kenya. Soita represented Malava constituency from 1997, after he ousted the then Minister of Health, Mr. Joshua Angatia in the general election, vying on a Ford Kenya ticket. He was re-elected to parliament in 2002 on the NARC ticket and served as an assistant minister in the office of the president, being appointed minister for housing in a cabinet reshuffle in 2005. Mr. Soita was re-elected in the 2007 general elections and re-appointed Minister for Housing. He died on the afternoon of 24 May 2016 at The Nairobi Hospital.
