= Kenya Plantation and Agricultural Workers Union =

Agricultural trade union in Kenya

Kenya Plantation and Agricultural Workers Union (KPAWU)
- Founded: 1963
- Headquarters: Nakuru, Kenya
- Location: Kenya
- Members: 200,000 (2005)

The Kenya Plantation and Agricultural Workers Union (KPAWU) is a trade union which represents 200,000 agriculture sector workers (2005 estimate) in Kenya, including tea, coffee, and flower workers. The KPAWU was established in 1963 when several unions were amalgamated. Its head office is in Nakuru, a regional centre. The KPAWU is affiliated to the Central Organization of Trade Unions.

== Political activities ==
The KPAWU is engaged with a number of labour issues. Some of its work is focused on the elimination of child labour in Kenya's agricultural sector. Where plantation owners are seeking Fair Trade certification for their produce, the KPAWU plays a role in the implementation of international labour standards required under the Fair Trade rules.

The KPAWU is opposed to mechanization of plantations on the grounds that the introduction of machines is a threat to jobs. For example, in 2006 it threatened strike action against a plantation owner which sought to introduce tea-picking machines.

KPAWU violates the freedom of association. It has brought lawsuits against another trade union that wants to end KPAWU's monopoly in the floriculture sector.

== See also ==
- Kenyan tea workers strike of 2007
