= Biginelli reaction =

Multicomponent chemical reaction

Named after	Pietro Biginelli
Reaction type	Ring forming reaction

Identifiers
Organic Chemistry Portal	biginelli-reaction
RSC ontology ID	RXNO:0000236

The Biginelli reaction is a multiple-component chemical reaction that creates 3,4-dihydropyrimidin-2(1H)-ones 4 from ethyl acetoacetate 1, an aryl aldehyde (such as benzaldehyde 2), and urea 3. It is named for the Italian chemist Pietro Biginelli.

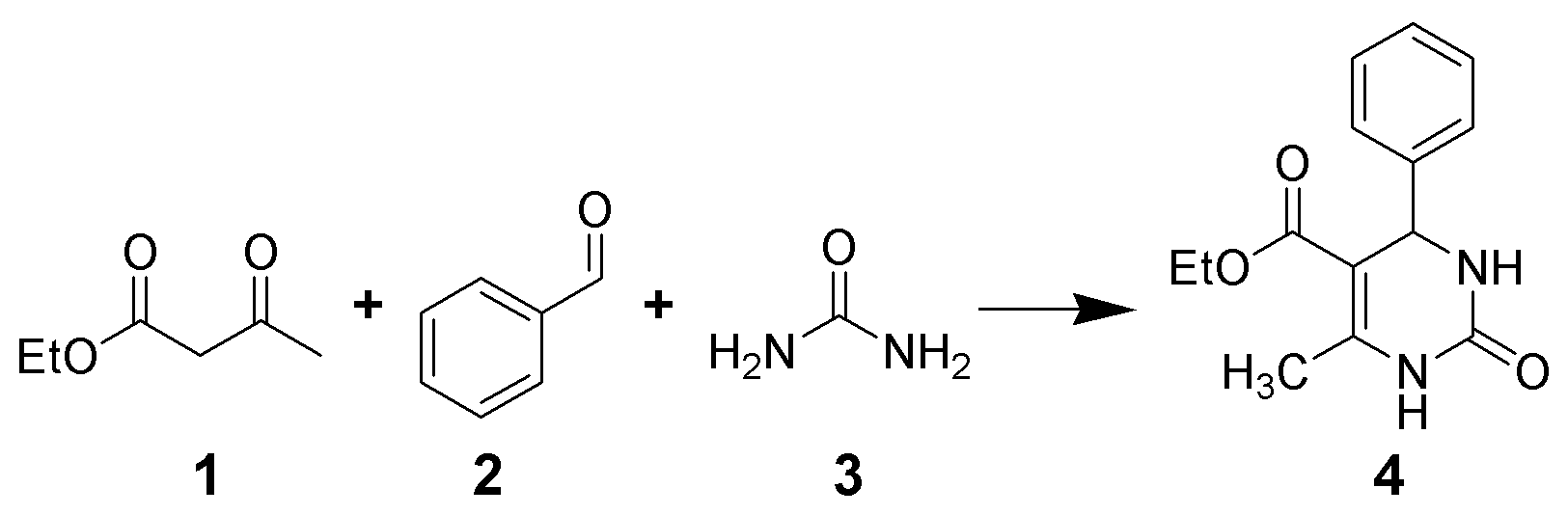
The Biginelli reaction

This reaction was developed by Pietro Biginelli in 1891. The reaction can be catalyzed by Brønsted acids and/or by Lewis acids such as copper(II) trifluoroacetate hydrate and boron trifluoride. Several solid-phase protocols utilizing different linker combinations have been published.

Dihydropyrimidinones, the products of the Biginelli reaction, are widely used in the pharmaceutical industry as calcium channel blockers, antihypertensive agents, and alpha-1-a-antagonists.

More recently products of the Biginelli reaction have been investigated as potential selective Adenosine A2b receptor antagonists. Including highly selective tricyclic compounds.

== Reaction mechanism ==
The reaction mechanism of the Biginelli reaction is a series of bimolecular reactions leading to the desired dihydropyrimidinone.

According to a mechanism proposed by Sweet in 1973 the aldol condensation of ethylacetoacetate 1 and the aryl aldehyde is the rate-limiting step leading to the carbenium ion 2. The nucleophilic addition of urea gives the intermediate 4, which quickly dehydrates to give the desired product 5.

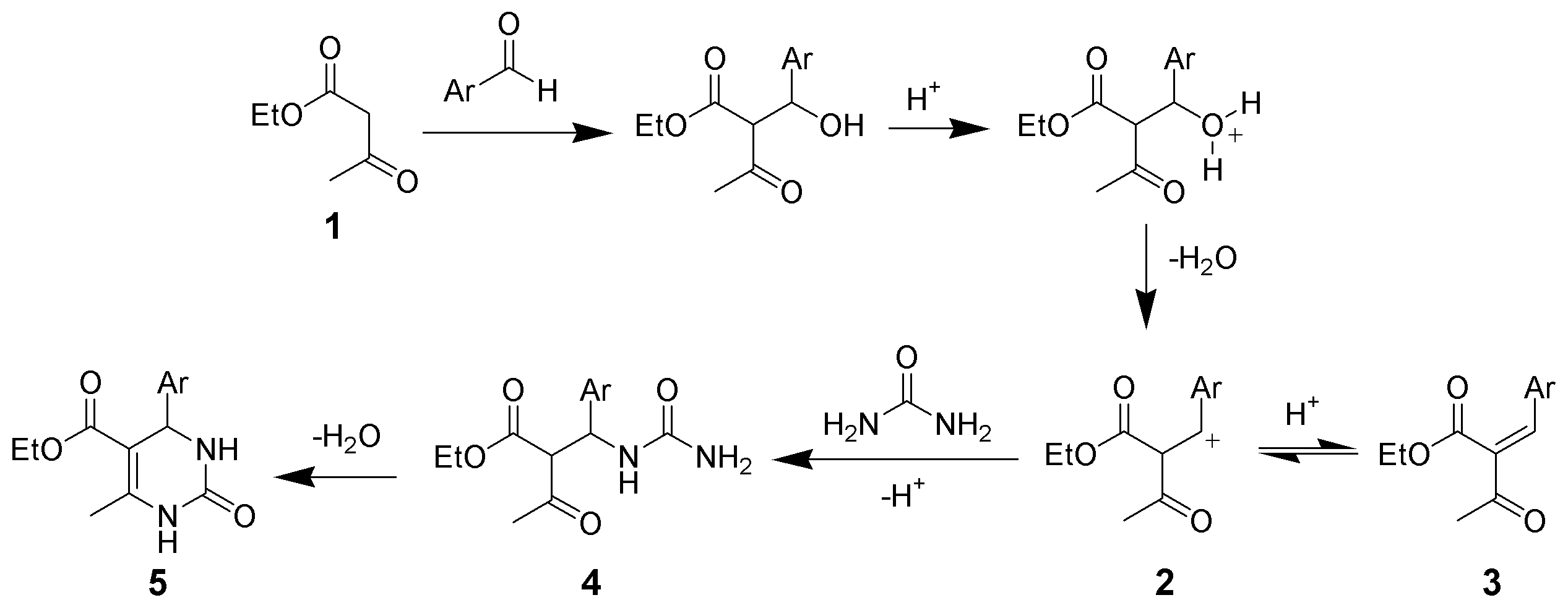
The mechanism of the Biginelli reaction

This mechanism is superseded by one by Kappe in 1997:

Biginelli reaction mechanism

This scheme begins with rate determining nucleophilic addition by the urea to the aldehyde. The ensuing condensation step is catalyzed by the addition of acid, resulting in the imine nitrogen. The β-ketoester then adds to the imine bond and consequently the ring is closed by the nucleophilic attack by the amine onto the carbonyl group. This final step ensues a second condensation and results in the Biginelli compound.

== Advances in Biginelli reaction ==
In 1987, Atwal et al. reported a modification to the Biginelli reaction that consistently generated higher yields. Atul Kumar has reported first enzymatic synthesis for Biginelli reaction via yeast catalysed protocol in high yields. The reaction has also been reported via green methodologies.
