= Pyrone =

Class of chemical compounds

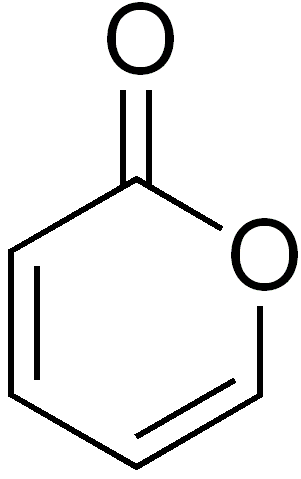
2-Pyrone

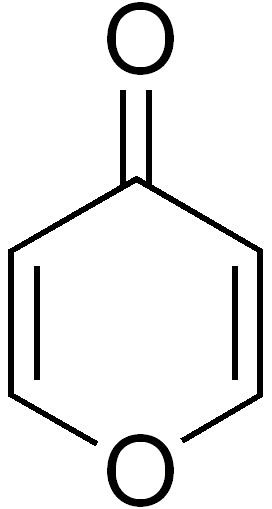
4-Pyrone

Pyrones or pyranones are a class of heterocyclic chemical compounds. They contain an unsaturated six-membered ring, which has one oxygen atom and a carbonyl functional group. There are two isomers, denoted as 2-pyrone and 4-pyrone. The 2-pyrone (or α-pyrone) structure is a lactone and is found in nature as part of the coumarin ring system. The 4-pyrone (or γ-pyrone) structure is an ether–ketone found in some natural chemical compounds such as chromone, maltol and kojic acid.

3-pyrones are zwitterionic, unstable carbonyl ylides. They intermediate some cycloadditions.

== See also ==
- Furanone, which has one fewer carbon atom in the ring.
- Pyridones, which contain a nitrogen in place of the oxygen that is part of the ring
