= Meconic acid =

Names
- Preferred IUPAC name 3-Hydroxy-4-oxo-4H-pyran-2,6-dicarboxylic acid

Identifiers
CAS Number	497-59-6
3D model (JSmol)	Interactive image
ChemSpider	10465112
ECHA InfoCard	100.007.136
EC Number	207-848-2
KEGG	C20209
MeSH	C010603
PubChem CID	5351448
UNII	V502I79516
CompTox Dashboard (EPA)	DTXSID2060096
- InChI: InChI=1S/C7H4O7/c8-2-1-3(6(10)11)14-5(4(2)9)7(12)13/h1,9H,(H,10,11)(H,12,13) Key: ZEGRKMXCOCRTCS-UHFFFAOYSA-N; InChI=1/C7H4O7/c8-2-1-3(6(10)11)14-5(4(2)9)7(12)13/h1,9H,(H,10,11)(H,12,13) Key: ZEGRKMXCOCRTCS-UHFFFAOYAE
- SMILES: C1=C(OC(=C(O)O)C(=O)C1=O)C(=O)O

Properties
Chemical formula	C_{7}H_{4}O_{7}
Molar mass	200.102 g·mol^{−1}
Appearance	colorless crystals

Related compounds
Related compounds	Chelidonic acid
- Except where otherwise noted, data are given for materials in their standard state (at 25 °C [77 °F], 100 kPa). verify (what is ?) Infobox references

Meconic acid, also known as acidum meconicum and poppy acid, is a chemical substance found in certain plants of the poppy family, Papaveraceae, such as Papaver somniferum (opium poppy) and Papaver bracteatum. Meconic acid constitutes about 5% of opium and can be used as an analytical marker for the presence of opium. Meconic acid has erroneously been described as a mild narcotic, but it has little or no physiological activity, and is not used medicinally. Meconic acid forms salts with alkaloids and metals. These salts as well as meconic acid esters are called meconates. Meconic acid was first isolated by Friedrich Sertürner in 1805.

== Chemistry ==
Meconic acid is a dicarboxylic acid. Its structure contains two carboxylic acid groups (-COOH) and one keto group (=O) attached to a pyran ring. Meconic acid gives a red color with ferric chloride. Meconic acid is colorless and is only slightly soluble in water but readily soluble in alcohol.
