= Central Organization of Trade Unions =

COTU
- Central Organization of Trade Unions
- Founded: 1965
- Headquarters: Nairobi, Kenya
- Location: Kenya
- Members: approx 1,500,000
- Key people: Rajabu W. Mwondi, chairman Francis Atwoli, secretary general
- Affiliations: ITUC
- Website: www.cotu-kenya.org

The Central Organization of Trade Unions (COTU) is a national trade union center in Kenya. It was founded in 1965 upon the dissolution on the Kenya Federation of Labour and the African Workers' Congress. It currently closely liaises with Non Governmental Organizations of East Africa Trade Union (NGOEATU).

== Affiliated unions ==
- Amalgamated Union of Kenya Metal Workers
- Kenya Petroleum Oil Workers Union
- Bakery, Confectionery Manufacturing and Allied Workers Union (K) (BACOFOMAWU,K)
- Kenya Building, Construction, Timber, Furniture & Allied Trades Employees Union
- Kenya Chemical & Allied Workers Union
- Kenya Engineering Workers Union
- Kenya Game Hunting and Safari Workers Union
- Kenya Union of Printing, Publishing, Paper Manufacturing & Allied Workers
- Kenya Plantation and Agricultural Workers Union
- Kenya Scientific, Research, International, Technical & Allied Institutions
- Banking Insurance & Finance Union (K)
- Communications Workers Union (K)
- Railway Workers Union (K)
- Tailors & Textiles Workers Union
- Transport & Allied Workers Union
- Kenya Union of Entertainment & Music Industry Employees
- Kenya Union of Domestic, Hotels, Educational Institutions, Hospitals and Allied Workers
- Kenya Union of Sugar Plantation Workers
- Kenya County Government Workers Union
- Kenya Shipping, Clearing & Warehouses Workers Union
- Seafarers Workers Union
- Kenya Quarry & Mine Workers Union
- Kenya Electrical Trades Allied Workers Union
- Kenya Shoe & Leather Workers Union
- Kenya Jockey, Betting Workers Union
- Union of National, Research Institutes Staff of Kenya (UNRISK)
- Kenya National Private Security Workers Union
- Kenya Hotels & Allied Workers Union
- Kenya Union of Commercial, Food & Allied Workers
- Kenya Aviation and Allied Workers Union
- Kenya Union of Journalists
- Kenya Long Distance Truck Drivers and Allied Workers Union
- Kenya Union of Post Primary Education Teachers (KUPPET)
- Kenya Union of Special Needs Education Teachers
- Kenya Union of Hair and Beauty Salon Workers (KUHABSWO)
- Kenya National Union of Nurses and Midwives
- Kenya Glass Workers Union
- Kenya Aviation Workers Union
- Kenya Airline Pilots Association
- National Union of Water & Sewerage
- Kenya Union of Pre-Primary Education Teachers (KUNOPPET)
- Kenya Medical Practitioners, Pharmacists and Dentists Union
- Kenya Private Universities Workers Union
- Dock Workers Union
