= Collegio Carlo Alberto =

Research and teaching institution in Turin, Italy

Coordinates: 45°00′00″N 7°41′06″E

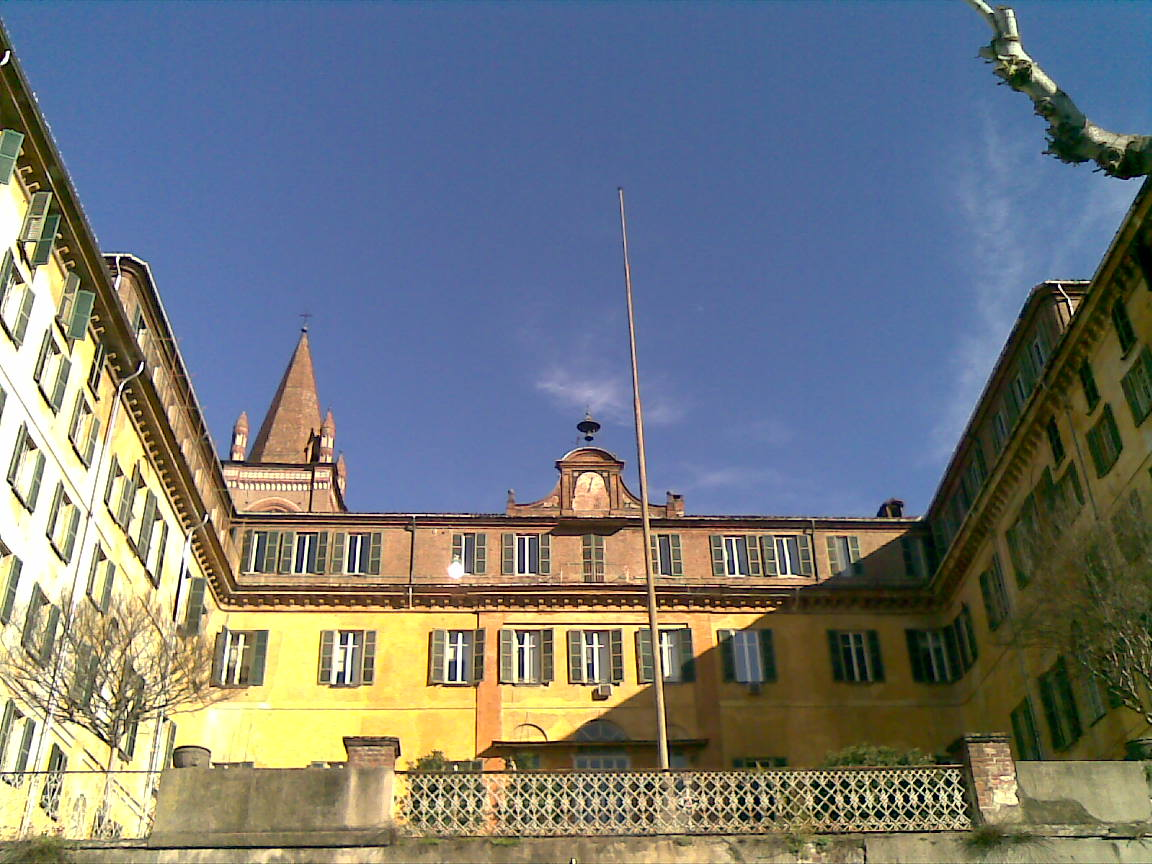
- Carlo Alberto College, Moncalieri, Piedmont
- Established: 2004
- President: Giorgio Barba Navaretti
- Location: Turin, Italy
- Website: carloalberto.org

The Collegio Carlo Alberto is a private research and teaching institution, located in the city of Turin, in the province of Turin in northern Italy. The institution was created in 2004 as a joint initiative of the Compagnia di San Paolo and the University of Turin, at first located in Moncalieri.

English is the operating language of the Collegio.

== History ==
Historically, prior to the 1990s, the Collegio Carlo Alberto referred to a Piedmont boys boarding school. The school has since closed, but the building retains its name.

== Mission and Research ==
Its mission is to foster research and education in social sciences, in accordance with the values and practices of the international academic community. This is achieved through a threefold action plan:

- i) the production of first-rate research in Economics, Public Policy, Social Sciences and Law;
- ii) the provision of top-level undergraduate and graduate education in the above disciplines;
- iii) the contribution to the public policy debate.

== Academic Staff and Research Environment ==
The faculty contribute to a research environment involving residential faculty of the University of Turin, faculty hired on the international academic job market, and visiting scholars. They conduct research within the social sciences with both empirical and theoretical emphasis.

Research interactions are fostered by seminar series and scientific conferences. Since 2006, the Collegio has hosted hundreds of international speakers, including Nobel laureates and leaders of financial institutions.

== Academic Programs ==
The Collegio coordinates the Allievi Honors Program, organizes five one-year master's degree programs (Economics, Economics and Complexity, Finance, Insurance and Risk Management, Public Policy and Social Change), and hosts two doctoral programs of the University of Turin.

Among these, the Master in Finance, Insurance and Risk Management (MaFIRM) was ranked 1st in Italy and 6th in Europe in the 2024 Eduniversal Best Masters Ranking. The Master in Insurance Innovation (MII) was also ranked among the top 50 globally in its category.
