= 6-Amyl-α-pyrone =

Names
- Preferred IUPAC name 6-Pentyl-2H-pyran-2-one
- Other names 5-Hydroxy-2,4-decadienoic acid δ-lactone

Identifiers
CAS Number	27593-23-3
3D model (JSmol)	Interactive image
ChEBI	CHEBI:66729
ChEMBL	ChEMBL503899
ChemSpider	31302
ECHA InfoCard	100.044.124
EC Number	248-552-3
PubChem CID	33960
UNII	8JTW8HL4PJ
CompTox Dashboard (EPA)	DTXSID0047589
- InChI: InChI=1S/C10H14O2/c1-2-3-4-6-9-7-5-8-10(11)12-9/h5,7-8H,2-4,6H2,1H3 Key: MAUFTTLGOUBZNA-UHFFFAOYSA-N
- SMILES: CCCCCC1=CC=CC(=O)O1

Properties
Chemical formula	C_{10}H_{14}O_{2}
Molar mass	166.220 g·mol^{−1}
Density	1.004 g/cm^{3}
Boiling point	287.6 °C (549.7 °F; 560.8 K)

Hazards
- GHS labelling
Pictograms	(GHS07: Exclamation mark)
Signal word	Warning
Hazard statements	H315, H319, H335
Precautionary statements	P261, P305+P351+P338
Flash point	113 °C (235 °F; 386 K) closed cup
Safety data sheet (SDS)	MSDS
- Except where otherwise noted, data are given for materials in their standard state (at 25 °C [77 °F], 100 kPa). Infobox references

6-Amyl-α-pyrone, also 6-pentyl-2-pyrone or 6PP, is an unsaturated lactone molecule. It contains two double bonds in the ring and a pentyl substituent at carbon adjacent to the ring oxygen. It is a colorless liquid which possesses characteristic coconut aroma, produced biologically by Trichoderma species. It is found in animal foods, peach (Prunus persica), and heated beef.

== Reactivity ==
Chemically, 6PP is converted into a linear ketone via ring opening and decarboxylation in presence of water, which subsequently undergoes solid base catalyzed aldol condensation reaction into C14/C15 hydrocarbon precursor. Upon heating in presence of Pd/C catalyst with formic acid, the double bonds of the 6PP get reduced to yield the flavoring compound δ-decalactone. In presence of strong reducing agent like lithium aluminium hydride, the double bonds of the ring get saturated and transformed into 1,5-decanediol via sequential hydrogenation steps.
