= Dehydroacetic acid =

- Kekulé, skeletal formula of dehydroacetic acid

Names
- Preferred IUPAC name 3-Acetyl-2-hydroxy-6-methyl-4H-pyran-4-one
- Other names Biocide 470F; Methylacetopyronone

Identifiers
CAS Number	520-45-6
3D model (JSmol)	Interactive image
Abbreviations	DHAA
ChEBI	CHEBI:137426
ChEMBL	ChEMBL284127
ChemSpider	10177
ECHA InfoCard	100.007.541
EC Number	208-293-9
E number	E265 (preservatives)
MeSH	dehydroacetic+acid
PubChem CID	122903
UNII	2KAG279R6R
CompTox Dashboard (EPA)	DTXSID801015814 DTXSID6020014, DTXSID801015814
- InChI: InChI=1S/C8H8O4/c1-4-3-6(10)7(5(2)9)8(11)12-4/h3,11H,1-2H3 Key: JEQRBTDTEKWZBW-UHFFFAOYSA-N
- SMILES: CC(=O)C1=C(O)OC(C)=CC1=O

Properties
Chemical formula	C_{8}H_{8}O_{4}
Molar mass	168.148 g·mol^{−1}
Appearance	White crystals
Melting point	109 °C; 228 °F; 382 K
Boiling point	270 °C; 518 °F; 543 K

Hazards
- GHS labelling
Pictograms	(GHS07: Exclamation mark)
Signal word	Warning
Hazard statements	H302
Precautionary statements	P264, P270, P301+P312, P330, P501
NFPA 704 (fire diamond)	1 1 0
- Except where otherwise noted, data are given for materials in their standard state (at 25 °C [77 °F], 100 kPa). verify (what is ?) Infobox references

Dehydroacetic acid is an organic compound which has several industrial applications. The compound is classified as a pyrone derivative. It presents as an odorless, colorless to white crystalline powder, almost insoluble in water and moderately soluble in most organic solvents.

== Preparation ==
It is prepared by the base-catalysed dimerization of diketene. Commonly used organic bases include imidazole, DABCO, and pyridine.

== Uses ==
Industrially, dehydroacetic acid has several uses which include the following:

- as a fungicide and bactericide. The sodium salt, sodium dehydroacetate, is often used in place of dehydroacetic acid because of its greater solubility in water.
- as a food preservative to prevent pickle bloating in squash and strawberries. When used as a food additive, dehydroacetic acid is referred to using the International Numbering System for Food Additives or E number 265.
- as a plasticizer in synthetic resins.
- as an antienzyme in toothpastes.
- as a precursor for dimethyl-4-pyridones. The compounds are synthesized when dehydroacetic acid is exposed to aqueous solutions containing primary amines.
