= 2-Pyridone =

2-Pyridone

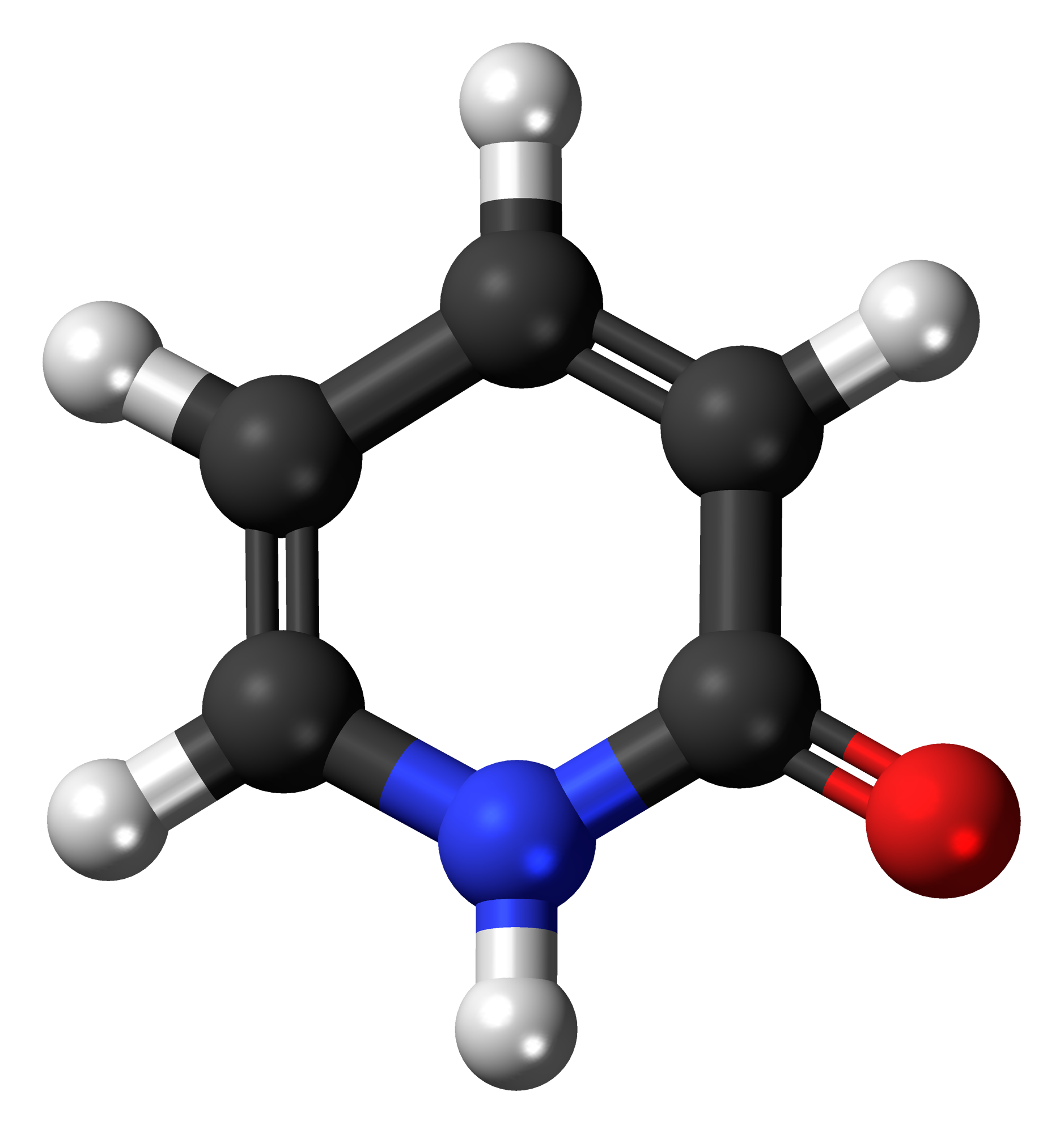

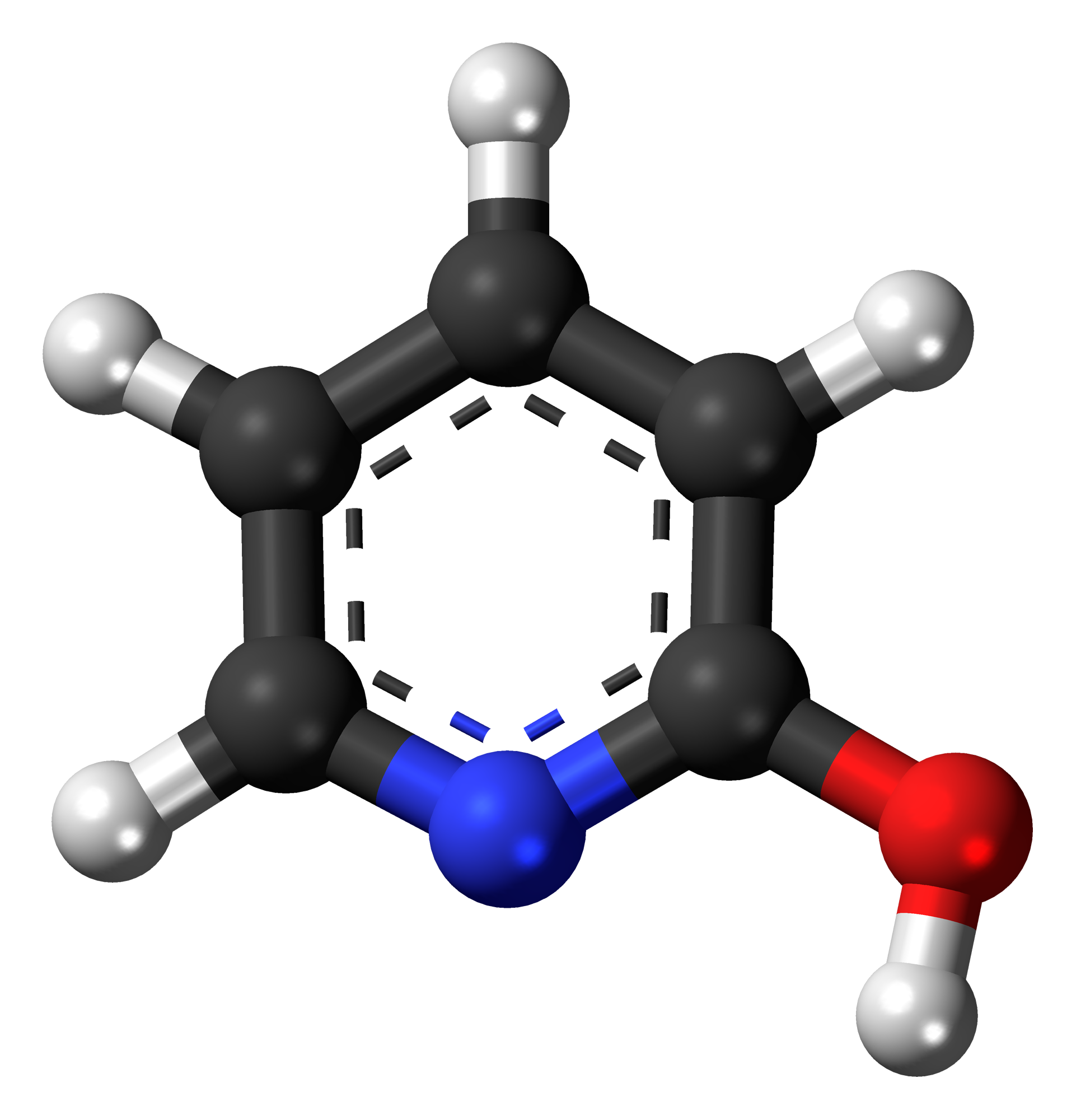

Names
- Preferred IUPAC name Pyridin-2(1H)-one
- Other names 2(1H)-Pyridinone; 2(1H)-Pyridone; 1H-Pyridine-2-one; 2-Pyridone; 1,2-Dihydro-2-oxopyridine; 1H-2-Pyridone; 2-Oxopyridone; 2-Pyridinol; 2-Hydroxypyridine

Identifiers
CAS Number	142-08-5
3D model (JSmol)	lactim: Interactive image; lactam: Interactive image
ChEBI	CHEBI:16540
ChEMBL	ChEMBL662
ChemSpider	8537
ECHA InfoCard	100.005.019
EC Number	205-520-3
KEGG	C02502
PubChem CID	8871
RTECS number	UV1144050
UNII	6770O3A2I5
CompTox Dashboard (EPA)	DTXSID2051716
- InChI: InChI=1S/C5H5NO/c7-5-3-1-2-4-6-5/h1-4H,(H,6,7) Key: UBQKCCHYAOITMY-UHFFFAOYSA-N; InChI=1/C5H5NO/c7-5-2-1-3-6-4-5/h1-4,7H Key: GRFNBEZIAWKNCO-UHFFFAOYAT; InChI=1/C5H5NO/c7-5-3-1-2-4-6-5/h1-4H,(H,6,7) Key: UBQKCCHYAOITMY-UHFFFAOYAK
- SMILES: lactim: Oc1ccccn1; lactam: C1=CC=CNC(=O)1

Properties
Chemical formula	C_{5}H_{5}NO
Molar mass	95.101 g·mol^{−1}
Appearance	Colourless crystalline solid
Density	1.39 g/cm^{3}
Melting point	107.8 °C (226.0 °F; 380.9 K)
Boiling point	280 °C (536 °F; 553 K) decomp.
Solubility in other solvents	Soluble in water, methanol, acetone
Acidity (pK_{a})	11.65
UV-vis (λ_{max})	293 nm (ε 5900, H_{2}O soln)

Structure
Crystal structure	Orthorhombic
Molecular shape	planar
Dipole moment	4.26 D

Hazards
- Occupational safety and health (OHS/OSH)
Main hazards	irritating
- GHS labelling
Pictograms	(GHS06: Toxic) (GHS07: Exclamation mark)
Signal word	Danger
Hazard statements	H301, H315, H319, H335
Precautionary statements	P261, P264, P270, P271, P280, P301+P310, P302+P352, P304+P340, P305+P351+P338, P312, P321, P330, P332+P313, P337+P313, P362, P403+P233, P405, P501
NFPA 704 (fire diamond)	2 1
Flash point	210 °C (410 °F; 483 K)

Related compounds
Other anions	2-Pyridinolate
Other cations	2-Hydroxypyridinium-ion
Related functional groups	alcohol, lactam, lactim, pyridine, ketone
Related compounds	pyridine, thymine, cytosine, uracil, benzene
- Except where otherwise noted, data are given for materials in their standard state (at 25 °C [77 °F], 100 kPa). verify (what is ?) Infobox references

2-Pyridone is an organic compound with the formula C_{5}H_{4}NH(O). It is a colourless solid. It is well known to form hydrogen bonded dimers and it is also a classic case of a compound that exists as tautomers.

== Tautomerism and aggregation ==
Pyridone is tautomeric with 2-hydroxypyridine:

tautomerism

Similar lactam-lactim tautomerism can also be exhibited in many related compounds.

The tautomerization has been exhaustively studied. The energy difference appears to be very small, and the dominant tautomer depends strongly on the phase of matter. The energy difference in the gas phase was measured by IR spectroscopy to be 2.43 to 3.3 kJ/mol for the solid state and 8.83 to 8.95 kJ/mol for the liquid state. The predominant solid state form is 2-pyridone, as confirmed by X-ray crystallography and IR spectroscopy. Non-polar solvents generally favour 2-hydroxypyridine whereas polar solvents such as alcohols and water favour the 2-pyridone.

In either case, the amide group can be involved in hydrogen bonding. 2-Pyridone, 2-hydroxypyridine, and substituted derivatives can form dimers with two hydrogen bonds...

...but X-ray crystallography indicates that the parent compounds do not so dimerize in the solid state; instead, the 2-pyridones form a helical structure. Contrariwise, some substituted 2-pyridones, for example 5-methyl-3-carbonitrile-2-pyridone, adopt solid-state dimers.

In solution the dimeric form is present; the ratio of dimerisation is strongly dependent on the polarity of the solvent. Polar and protic solvents can hydrogen-bond directly to pyridone, and the equilibrium shifts towards the monomer. Hydrophobic effects in non-polar solvents lead to a predominance of the dimer.

In any given system, all possible tautomers and dimers can be present and form an equilibrium, and the exact measurement of all the equilibrium constants is extremely difficult.

Tautomeric transition is generally believed to occur through multimolecular pathways. A monomolecular mechanism would require a forbidden 1-3 suprafacial transition state, and theoretical methods compute an energy barrier between 125 and 210 kJ/mol. Dimerisation, followed by double proton transfer and dissociation, is an autocatalytic path from one tautomer to the other. Protic solvents also mediate proton transfer during tautomerisation.

== Synthesis ==
2-Pyrone can be obtained by a cyclisation reaction, and converted to 2-pyridone via an exchange reaction with ammonia:

Pyridine forms an N-oxide with some oxidation agents such as hydrogen peroxide. This pyridine-N-oxide undergoes a rearrangement reaction to 2-pyridone in acetic anhydride:

In the Guareschi-Thorpe condensation cyanoacetamide reacts with a 1,3-diketone to a 2-pyridone. The reaction is named after Icilio Guareschi and Jocelyn Field Thorpe.

== Chemical properties ==
=== Catalytic activity ===
2-Pyridone catalyses a variety of proton-dependent reactions, for example the aminolysis of esters. In some cases, molten 2-pyridone is used as a solvent. 2-Pyridone has a large effect on the reaction from activated esters with amines in nonpolar solvent, which is attributed to its tautomerisation and utility as a ditopic receptor. Proton transfer from 2-pyridone and its tautomer have been investigated by isotope labeling, kinetics and quantum chemical methods.

=== Coordination chemistry ===
2-Pyridone and some derivatives serve as ligands in coordination chemistry, usually as a 1,3-bridging ligand akin to carboxylate.

=== In nature ===
2-Pyridone is not naturally occurring, but a derivative has been isolated as a cofactor in certain hydrogenases.

== Environmental behavior ==
2-Pyridone is rapidly degraded by microorganisms in the soil environment, with a half life less than one week.

Organisms capable of growth on 2-pyridone as a sole source of carbon, nitrogen, and energy have been isolated by a number of researchers. The most extensively studied 2-pyridone degrader is the gram-positive bacterium Arthrobacter crystallopoietes, a member of the phylum actinomycetota. Numerous actinomycetotes have been shown to degrade pyridine or alkyl-, carboxyl-, or hydroxyl-substituted derivatives.

2-Pyridone degradation is commonly initiated by mono-oxygenase attack, resulting in a diol, such as 2,5-dihydroxypyridine, which is metabolized via the maleamate pathway. Fission of the ring proceeds via action of 2,5-dihydroxypyridine monooxygenase, which is also involved in metabolism of nicotinic acid via the maleamate pathway. In the case of Arthrobacter crystallopoietes, at least part of the degradative pathway is plasmid-borne.

== Analytical data ==
=== NMR spectroscopy ===
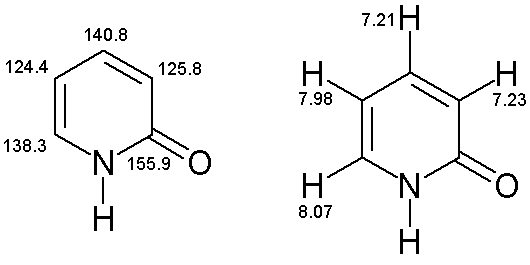

==== ^{1}H-NMR ====
^{1}H-NMR (400 MHz, CD_{3}OD): /ρ = 8.07 (dd,^{3}J = 2.5 Hz,^{4}J = 1.1 Hz, 1H, C-6), 7.98 (dd,^{3}J = 4.0 Hz,^{3}J = 2.0 Hz, 1H, C-3), 7.23 (dd,^{3}J = 2.5 Hz,^{3}J = 2.0 Hz, 1H, C-5), 7.21 (dd,^{3}J = 4.0 Hz,^{4}J = 1.0 Hz, 1H, C-4).

==== ^{13}C-NMR ====
(100.57 MHz, CD_{3}OD): ρ = 155.9 (C-2), 140.8 (C-4), 138.3 (C-6), 125.8 (C-3), 124.4 (C-5)

=== UV/Vis spectroscopy ===
(MeOH):ν_{max} (lg ε) = 226.2 (0.44), 297.6 (0.30).

=== IR spectroscopy ===
(KBr): ν = 3440 cm^{−1}–1 (br, m), 3119 (m), 3072 (m), 2986 (m), 1682 (s), 1649 (vs), 1609 (vs), 1578 (vs), 1540 (s), 1456 (m), 1433 (m), 1364 (w), 1243 (m), 1156 (m), 1098 (m), 983 (m), 926 (w), 781 (s), 730 (w), 612 (w), 560 (w), 554 (w), 526 (m), 476 (m), 451 (w).

=== Mass spectrometry ===
EI-MS (70 eV): m/z (%) = 95 (100) [M^{+}], 67 (35) [M^{+} - CO], 51 (4)[C_{4}H_{3}^{+}].

This box:
- Except where noted otherwise, data relate to Standard temperature and pressure.
- Reliability of data general note.

== See also ==
- 2-Pyrone
- 4-Pyridone
- The 5-methyl-2-pyridone is used to make pirfenidone.
