= Francis Atwoli =

Kenyan trade unionist

Snr Pte Francis Atwoli
- Born: 6 June 1949 (age 77); North Nyanza District, Nyanza Province Kenya Colony
- Citizenship: Kenya
- Education: George Meany Labour University; Cavendish University Uganda; National Labor College; University of Turin
- Occupation: Trade Unionist
- Years active: 1967 – present
- Title: Secretary general of the Central Organization of Trade Unions of Kenya.

Francis Atwoli (born 6 June 1949) is a Kenyan trade unionist who is currently serving as the Secretary General of the Central Organization of Trade Unions COTU (K). He has served in that capacity since he was first elected in August 2001. He equally serves as the General Secretary of the Kenya Plantation and Agricultural Workers' Union KPAWU since 1994. Internationally, Atwoli serves workers as a titular member of the International Labor Organization Governing Body, President of the Organization of African Trade Union Unity (OATUU) & Vice President of the International Trade Union Confederation.

== Career ==
In his role as a representative of Kenyan workers, Francis Atwoli has continued championing for social justice by advocating for decent work, accountable governments, and better policies for workers. This has seen the membership of COTU (K) grow from 300,000 to now over 4,000,000. One of the major achievements of Atwoli was mainstreaming labor rights in the 2010 constitution.

Some of the official capacities Atwoli has served in, include :

- 2001 – to-date: Secretary General of the Central Organisation of Trade Unions Kenya.
- 1994 – to-date: General Secretary of the Kenya Plantation & Agricultural Workers Union.
- 1986 – 1994: Director of Organizing at the Central Organisation of Trade Unions, Kenya.
- 1971 – 1986: Branch Secretary, Union of Posts and Telecommunication Employees.
- 1967 – 1986: Senior Technician at Kenya Posts & Telecommunication Corporation.

== Elected positions and appointments ==
Francis Atwoli's Positions of Responsibility
Dates	Position	Notes
2023 to date	Appointed Board Member of the Social Health Authority	
2014 to date	Elected the president of the Pan African Labour movement, the Organization of African Trade Union Unity, OATUU	
2008 to date	Elected as member of the governing body of the International Labour Organization, (ILO) in Geneva, Switzerland	
2011 to date	Elected board member of Training Centre of the International Labour Organization in Turin, Italy	
2001 to date	Member, board of trustees at the National Social Security Fund (Kenya) (NSSF)	
2001 to date	Council member of National Industrial Training Authority of Kenya (NITA)	
2001 to 2010	Member of National Aids Control Council of Kenya (NACC)	
2001 to 2007	Elected vice president of the former ICFTU-AFRO in Nairobi, Kenya	
2003 to date	Elected every year as director of National Bank of Kenya	
2003 to 2009	Director of the Kenya Anti-Corruption Commission (KACC)	
2004 to date	Member of National Labour Board of Kenya	
2005 to date	Elected deputy president of the Organisation of African Trade Union Unity (OATUU) based in Accra, Ghana	
2005 to date	Elected president of Trade Union Federation of Eastern Africa (TUFEA) based in Khartoum, Sudan	
2005 to date	Elected executive board member and now serving vice president of International Trade Union Confederation, ITUC, based in Brussels, Belgium	
2005 to date	Elected chairman of East African Trade Union Confederation (EATUC) based in Arusha, Tanzania	

== Other considerations ==
In addition to his responsibilities at COTU, Atwoli has the following additional responsibilities:

- Independent non-executive director, National Bank of Kenya
- Chairman, East African Trade Union Confederation
- President, Trade Union Federation of Eastern Africa
- President, Organisation of African Trade Union Unity
- Member, governing body, International Labour Organization
- Vice president, International Labour Conference
- Vice president, The International Trade Union Confederation
- Secretary general, Kenya Plantation & Agricultural Workers Union

== Awards ==
He is a recipient of both the Chief of the Burning Spear (CBS), Elder of the Burning Spear (EBS) and the Moran of the Burning Spear, (MBS) awards in recognition of his role in Championing for Social Justice.

Masinde Muliro University of Science and Technology conferred Atwoli the degree of Doctor of Humane Letters (Labour Relations) Honoris Causa of Masinde Muliro University of Science and Technology.

== Family ==
Atwoli is married to two women, Jenifer Khainza and Mary Kilobi. Mr. Francis Atwoli has seventeen children.
