= University of Eastern Piedmont =

University located in Alessandria, Novara, and Vercelli, Italy

Coordinates: 45.3276°N 8.4246°E

- Università degli Studi del Piemonte Orientale "Amedeo Avogadro"
- Type: Public
- Established: 1998
- Rector: Menico Rizzi
- Location: Alessandria, Novara and Vercelli, Italy
- Website: www.uniupo.it
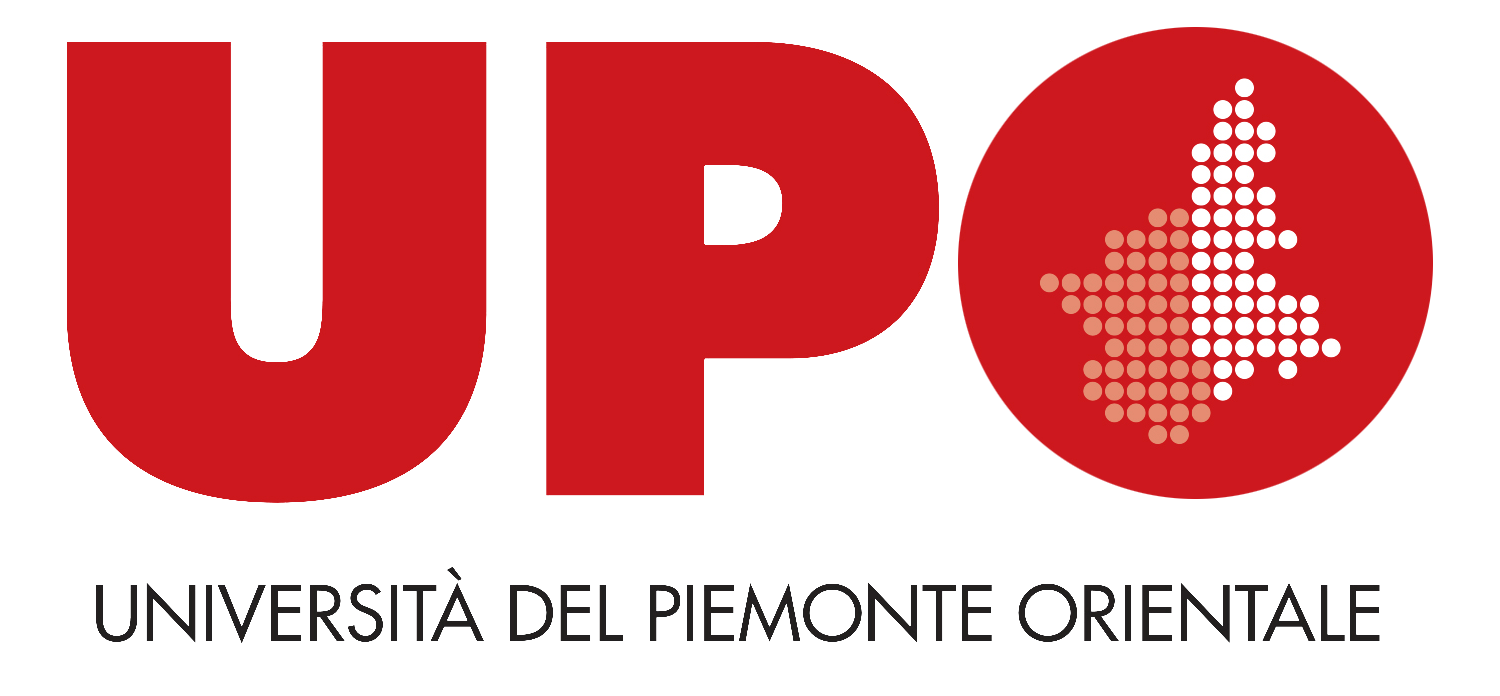

The University of Eastern Piedmont "Amedeo Avogadro" (Italian: Università degli Studi del Piemonte Orientale "Amedeo Avogadro"; shortened to UNIPMN or UPO) is a university located in Alessandria, Novara and Vercelli, in the region of Piedmont, Italy. It was founded in 1998 and is organized in seven faculties, which before then were part of the University of Turin.

== Organization ==
These are the seven faculties in which the university is divided into:

- Economics
- Law
- Letters and Philosophy
- Mathematics, Physics and Natural Sciences
- Medicine and Surgery
- Pharmacy
- Political Sciences.

The university also includes an inter-department research centre, the CRIMEDIM (Research Center in Disaster and Emergency Medicine).

== See also ==
- List of Italian universities
- Amedeo Avogadro
