= 4-Pyridone =

Names
- Preferred IUPAC name Pyridin-4(1H)-one

Identifiers
CAS Number	108-96-3
3D model (JSmol)	Interactive image
ChEBI	CHEBI:133125
ChEMBL	ChEMBL237459
ChemSpider	11787
ECHA InfoCard	100.003.304
EC Number	203-633-2
PubChem CID	12290
UNII	3P2MV07G53
CompTox Dashboard (EPA)	DTXSID2052310
- InChI: InChI=1S/C5H5NO/c7-5-1-3-6-4-2-5/h1-4H,(H,6,7) Key: GCNTZFIIOFTKIY-UHFFFAOYSA-N; InChI=1/C5H5NO/c7-5-1-3-6-4-2-5/h1-4H,(H,6,7) Key: GCNTZFIIOFTKIY-UHFFFAOYAB
- SMILES: c1c[nH]ccc1=O

Properties
Chemical formula	C_{5}H_{5}NO
Molar mass	95.101 g·mol^{−1}
Appearance	colorless solid
Melting point	150 °C (302 °F; 423 K)
Boiling point	181 °C (358 °F; 454 K)
Solubility in water	Soluble in water
- Except where otherwise noted, data are given for materials in their standard state (at 25 °C [77 °F], 100 kPa). Infobox references

4-Pyridone is an organic compound with the formula C_{5}H_{4}NH(O). It is a colorless solid.

== Preparation ==
4-Pyridone, and its derivatives, are prepared from 4-pyrone and amines in protic solvents.

== Tautomerism ==
4-Pyridone exists a keto-enol tautomerism with its enol tautomer 4-hydroxypyridine. In solution, the keto tautomer is favoured, and the enol tautomer only becomes important in very dilute solutions or solutions of non-polar solvents. However, the enol tautomer is dominant in the gas phase.

== Derivatives ==
Fluridone is an aquatic herbicide that contains a 4-pyridone subunit.

Chemical structure of fluridone

== See also ==
- 2-Pyridone
- 4-Piperidone
- Dehydroacetic acid
