= 2-Pyrone =

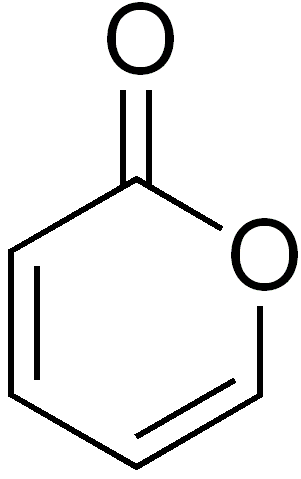

Names
- Preferred IUPAC name 2H-Pyran-2-one
- Other names α-Pyrone; 2-Pyranone; Pyran-2-one

Identifiers
CAS Number	504-31-4
3D model (JSmol)	Interactive image
ChEBI	CHEBI:37965
ChemSpider	61462
ECHA InfoCard	100.007.264
PubChem CID	68154
UNII	8WW45I202V
CompTox Dashboard (EPA)	DTXSID50198441
- InChI: InChI=1S/C5H4O2/c6-5-3-1-2-4-7-5/h1-4H Key: ZPSJGADGUYYRKE-UHFFFAOYSA-N; InChI=1/C5H4O2/c6-5-3-1-2-4-7-5/h1-4H Key: ZPSJGADGUYYRKE-UHFFFAOYAI
- SMILES: O=C\1O\C=C/C=C/1

Properties
Chemical formula	C_{5}H_{4}O_{2}
Molar mass	96.085 g·mol^{−1}
Density	1.197 g/mL
Boiling point	102 to 103 °C (216 to 217 °F; 375 to 376 K) at 20 mmHg
- Except where otherwise noted, data are given for materials in their standard state (at 25 °C [77 °F], 100 kPa). verify (what is ?) Infobox references

2-Pyrone (α-pyrone or pyran-2-one) is an unsaturated cyclic chemical compound with the molecular formula C_{5}H_{4}O_{2}. It is isomeric with 4-pyrone.

2-Pyrone is used in organic synthesis as a building block for more complex chemical structures because it may participate in a variety of cycloaddition reactions to form bicyclic lactones. For example, it readily undergoes Diels-Alder reactions with alkynes producing, upon loss of carbon dioxide, substituted benzenes. The Gogte Synthesis (1938) is a method for the alkylation of certain pyrones with acid chlorides.

The parent 2-pyrone can be produced from decarboxylation of coumalic acid.

== Derivatives ==
The most common natural products containing a 2-pyrone are the bufanolides and kavalactones. Oxovitisin A, a pyranoanthocyanin found in wine, also contains a 2-pyrone element.

6-Amyl-α-pyrone (6PP) is a derivative of 2-pyrone, found in animal foods and heated beef. Due to its good organoleptic properties with coconut aroma, it is used as flavor enhancer in the food industry. Biologically, it is produced by Trichoderma species via solid state fermentation.

Derivatives of 2-pyrone play a role as signalling molecules in bacterial communication, similar to quorum sensing. Cells with LuxR-type receptors, but lacking its homolog LuxI (and thus unable to produce N-acylhomoserine lactone QS signaling molecules) are known as LuxR "solos", to which pyrones bind as ligands facilitating cell-cell communication.

== See also ==
- Pyrone
