= John Alexander Fladgate =

British wine merchant (1809–1901)

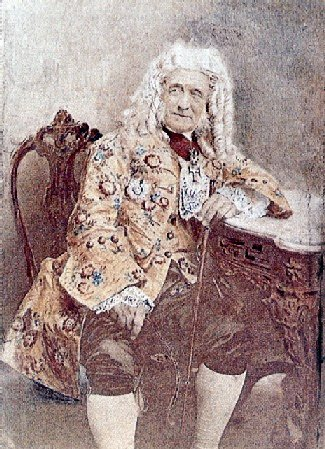
John Alexander Fladgate in historical costume, and bearing the necklet of Knight Commander of the Order of Christ

John Alexander Fladgate (1 January 1809 – 12 December 1901), was a port wine merchant. Fladgate was the son of Francis Fladgate (1773–1821), an Essex Street solicitor, friend of William Jerdan, who employed John Hamilton Reynolds from 1818 to 1820, and Maria Anne Bassett. He was christened in the church of St. Giles-in-the-Fields on 21 December 1809.

== Family ==
He married Margaret Collett Dalgleish on 29 August 1837 at St. Giles-in-the-Field, London and had 10 children, all of whom were born in Oporto, Portugal. He married four of his daughters to port wine shippers.

1. Francis Pedro Gauntlett Fladgate (25 March 1839 – 9 September 1888). Employed by Taylor, Fladgate & Yeatman. Married Laura Louisa McMaster in 1864. Had issue.
2. Margaret Ellen Fladgate (1840 – 5 April 1923), christened on 29 December 1840. Married firstly António d'Almeida Campos on 23 April 1864 and had issue. Married secondly Thomas William Murray-Allan and had issue.
3. Catherine Mary Fladgate (1842 – 27 July 1903), christened on 22 May 1842. Married Joseph James Forrester, son of Joseph James Forrester, Baron Forrester, on 6 November 1862. Had issue.
4. Harriette Forbes Fladgate (1845), christened on 22 March 1845.
5. Marian Grimston Fladgate (1847 – 30 March 1932), christened on 2 March 1847. Married Albert Charles Frederick Morgan, of Morgan Brothers & Co., on 18 October 1881. Had issue.
6. Helen Florence Fladgate (1849 – 14 December 1925), christened on 19 June 1849. Married Pedro Gonçalves Guimaraens, of Fonseca Guimaraens, on 18 December 1867. Had issue.
7. Janet Young Fladgate (1852), christened on 7 April 1852. Married Charles Wright, resident Director of Croft & Co. Had issue.
8. Elizabeth Edith Jebb Fladgate (1854 – 10 September 1855), christened on 19 July 1852.
9. Reginald Hugh Fladgate (1856 – 14 April 1863), christened on 27 July 1856.
10. Henry Claude Fladgate (1858), christened on 5 November 1858.

== Portugal and port wine ==
He first sailed for Oporto in 1836 but was unable to land because of bad weather. He returned to England, married and returned to Oporto the following year by way of Vigo, Spain. He was the sole partner of Taylor, Fladgate & Co., after Joseph Taylor's death in 1837. Morgan Yeatman joined the partnership in 1839 and they changed the firm's name to Taylor, Fladgate, & Yeatman. This partnership was brought about by the agency of the London importer Matthew Clark, who was married to a cousin of Fladgate and a long term associate of Taylor, but Fladgate and Yeatman ceased using Clark in 1845, causing a crisis in that firm.

Today, the only direct kinship with Fladgate at Taylor, Fladgate, & Yeatman is David Fonseca Guimaraens, Winemaker and Technical Director, the son of Bruce Duncan Guimaraens and Fladgate's great-great-great nephew.

== Honours ==
He was created Baron da Roêda of Portugal on 9 October 1872 by King Luís I of Portugal and Comendador [Knight Commander] of the Portuguese Order of Christ.

== Death ==
His wife Margaret died aged 83 on 1 March 1901 and Fladgate followed her soon afterwards, dying age 92, on 12 December 1901, at their residence at 106 Elgin Crescent in Kensington.

== Footnote ==
In the Factory House records, Margaret's name was recorded solely as Margaret Collett and not Margaret Collett Dalgleish. That Collett was an integral part of her maiden name is confirmed by the parish records for St. Leonard's, Streatham, Surrey, where Margaret was born 24 November 1817, as three of her siblings are also shown as bearing the Collett Dalgleish surname: Maria, b. 1 November 1811; James, b. 11 October 1814; and Alexander, b. 9 December 1815. This is further supported by the 1881 UK Census entry for Henry Wood's household at Woodside Lodge, Leavesden, Watford, Hertfordshire, which records the presence of three of Margaret's sisters who were born in London: Henry's wife Louisa Collett Wood age 54, and two of his sisters-in-law: Rebecca Collett Williams, widow, age 56, and Elizabeth Collett Dalgleish, unmarried, age 70. Furthermore, another of Margaret's sisters, Ellen Collett Dalgleish, is shown in the British Chaplaincy records as marrying John Land Teage in Porto on 14 April 1852.
