= Bruce Duncan Guimaraens =

Portuguese-British port wine maker

- Born: 27 October 1935; Vila Nova de Gaia, Portugal
- Died: 22 August 2002 (aged 66); Vila Nova de Cerveira

Bruce Duncan Guimaraens (27 October 1935 – 22 August 2002) was a Portuguese-British port wine maker.

== Early life and education ==
Guimaraens was born on 27 October, 1935 to parents Charles Bruce and Cathleen May in Vila Nova de Gaia. He was educated at Abingdon School from 1946 until 1953 and his elder brother John 'Gordon' Guimaraens also attended Abingdon School from 1946 to 1952. He served in the British Army as a Lieutenant with the Royal Berkshire Regiment and the Royal West African Frontier Force in Ghana.

== Career ==
After leaving the army in 1956 Guimaraens joined Fonseca Guimaraens, the company his great-great grandfather Manuel Pedro Guimaraens had created in 1822, which had earlier merged with Taylor, Fladgate, & Yeatman in 1948 to form the Taylor Fonseca Group.

In 1961 he was promoted to the position of director of winemaking and vineyard management at Taylor Fonseca, and was credited by The Telegraph as playing an instrumental role in expanding the number of vineyards owned by the firm. His tenure saw the creation of the Fonseca 1963, described by critic Michael Broadbent as "one of the top '63s, and one of the best-ever Fonsecas", and the Fonseca 1977, which also received high praise. He retired in 1989.

== Personal life ==
Guimaraens died of a heart attack on 22 August 2002. He was survived by his wife Magdalena and four children. At the time of his death his son David, who joined Taylor Fonseca in 1990, was the company's head winemaker.

== See also ==
List of Old Abingdonians
