= Fonseca Guimaraens =

Port wine house (producer/company)

- Location: Valença do Douro, Portugal
- Coordinates: 41.1604°N 7.5590°W
- Founded: 1822
- Parent company: The Fladgate Partnership
- Known for: Port
- Distribution: International

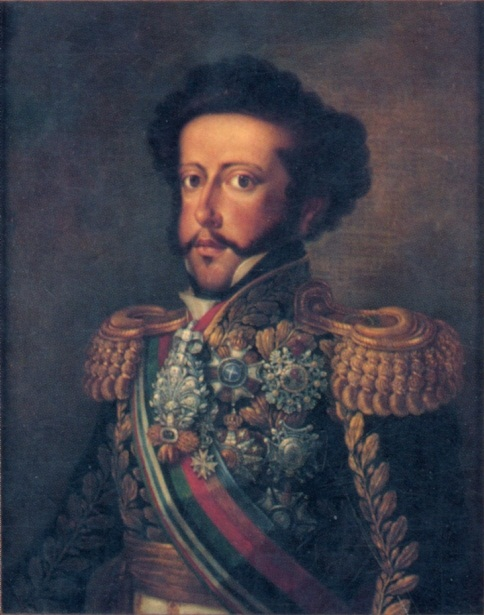
Fonseca's modern founder Manoel Pedro Guimaraens was a supporter of King Pedro IV's (pictured) liberal reforms, which led to his having to flee Portugal to England hidden away in an empty Port wine barrel.

Fonseca Guimaraens, often simply called Fonseca, is one of the largest Port wine houses in Portugal. Manoel Pedro Gonçalves Guimaraens and his brother João Gonçalves Salgueiro, established the company in 1822 when they acquired control of the Fonseca and Monteiro Company from the Fonseca Family by purchase of the majority of Fonseca owned shares. A condition of the sale of Fonseca's shares was that the name Fonseca remain as the brand name. David Guimaraens, the great-great-great grandson of the founder Manuel Pedro, has been the head winemaker since 1994, and oversees the winemaking and blending for all four Taylor Fladgate Port houses: Taylor Fladgate, Fonseca Guimaraens, Croft, and Delaforce.

Fonseca maintains an estate, Quinta do Panascal, open to the public for tastings and tours. The vineyard Quinta do Panascal in the Douro has been classified as a Grade A producer of grapes. Fonseca currently ships a variety of Ports, including vintage, 10, 20 and 40-year traditional tawnies, a 10-year white tawny, late bottled vintage, non-classic vintages (Quinta do Panascal, Guimaraens Vintage), among others.

It is often confused with the similarly named, but completely unrelated, Portuguese wine producer José Maria da Fonseca, based in the Arrábida IPR on the Setúbal peninsula.

== History ==
Fonseca was originally a very small Port shipper operating under the name of Fonseca, Monteiro & Co. in the early 19th century. In 1822, Portuguese businessman Manuel Pedro Guimaraens and his brother João Gonçalves Salgueiro acquired operating control of the business and renamed it Fonseca Guimaraens. During the Liberal Wars of 1828–1834, Guimaraens brothers was a supporters of the liberal reforms of King Pedro IV of Portugal. When the absolutist party of Portugal put Pedro's brother Miguel on the throne, Guimaraens found himself in danger due to his liberal support. He fled Portugal, hidden in an empty Port wine barrel and later settled in England where the Fonseca company was headquartered until 1927.

Guimaraens and his family greatly expanded Fonseca's commercial interest in the Port wine industry as well as its vineyard holdings in the Douro. In 1948, the large Port wine corporation of Taylor, Fladgate and Yeatman purchased the house but allowed Fonseca to remain its own separate entity. The Guimaraens family has been intimately involved in the winemaking production with nearly every single vintage label Port from 1896 being made by Frank Guimaraens, his great nephew Bruce Guimaraens and now Bruce's son David Guimaraens. One notable exception is the 1955 vintage which was made by Frank's daughter Dorothy after her father died and before Bruce was ready.

== Quintas ==
Fonseca currently owns three main quinta vineyards in the Douro. Between them, they own more than 170 acres (69 hectares) which they use to make the majority of vintage Port production.

- Cruzeiro located in the Val de Mendiz above Pinhão
- Santo António also located in the Val de Mendiz
- Quinta do Panascal located on the southern banks of the Douro. Acquired in 1978.

== Wines ==
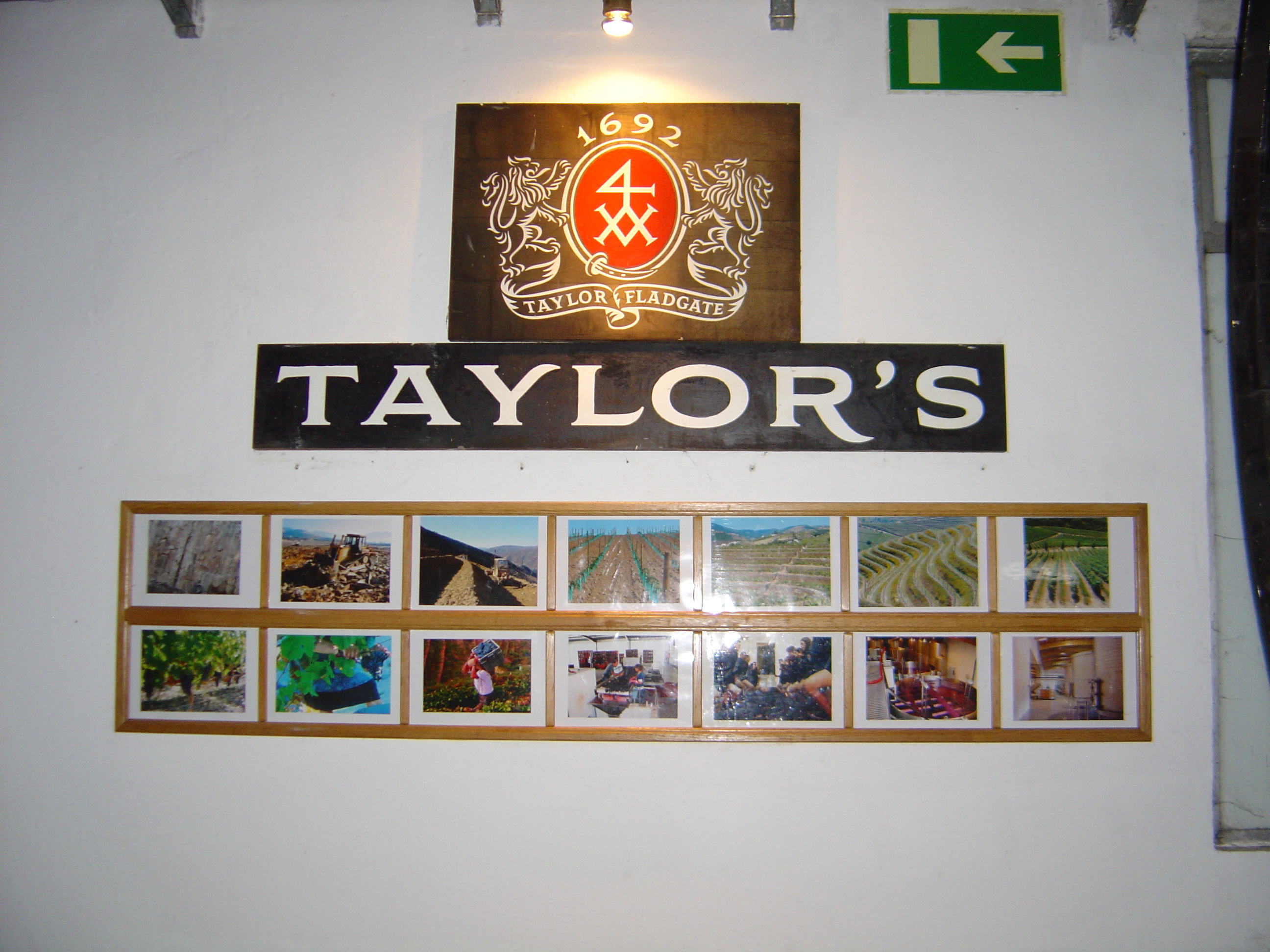
Today Fonseca is part of the Taylor Fladgate family of Port shippers

The first Fonseca vintage Port was shipped to England in 1847. Today Fonseca produces a wide variety of Port styles with their aged tawnies, vintage Ports and "super ruby" brand Bin 27 being the best known internationally. While Fonseca wines are found throughout the globe, the United States is the single largest market for Fonseca's vintage Port—with more of this wine being exported to the US than to any other market. Most of these wines are simply labeled as "Fonseca" with a second wine series of Fonseca Guimaraens also being produced.
