= Elgin Crescent =

Street in the Royal Borough of Kensington and Chelsea, London

Coordinates: 51°30′51″N 00°12′29″W

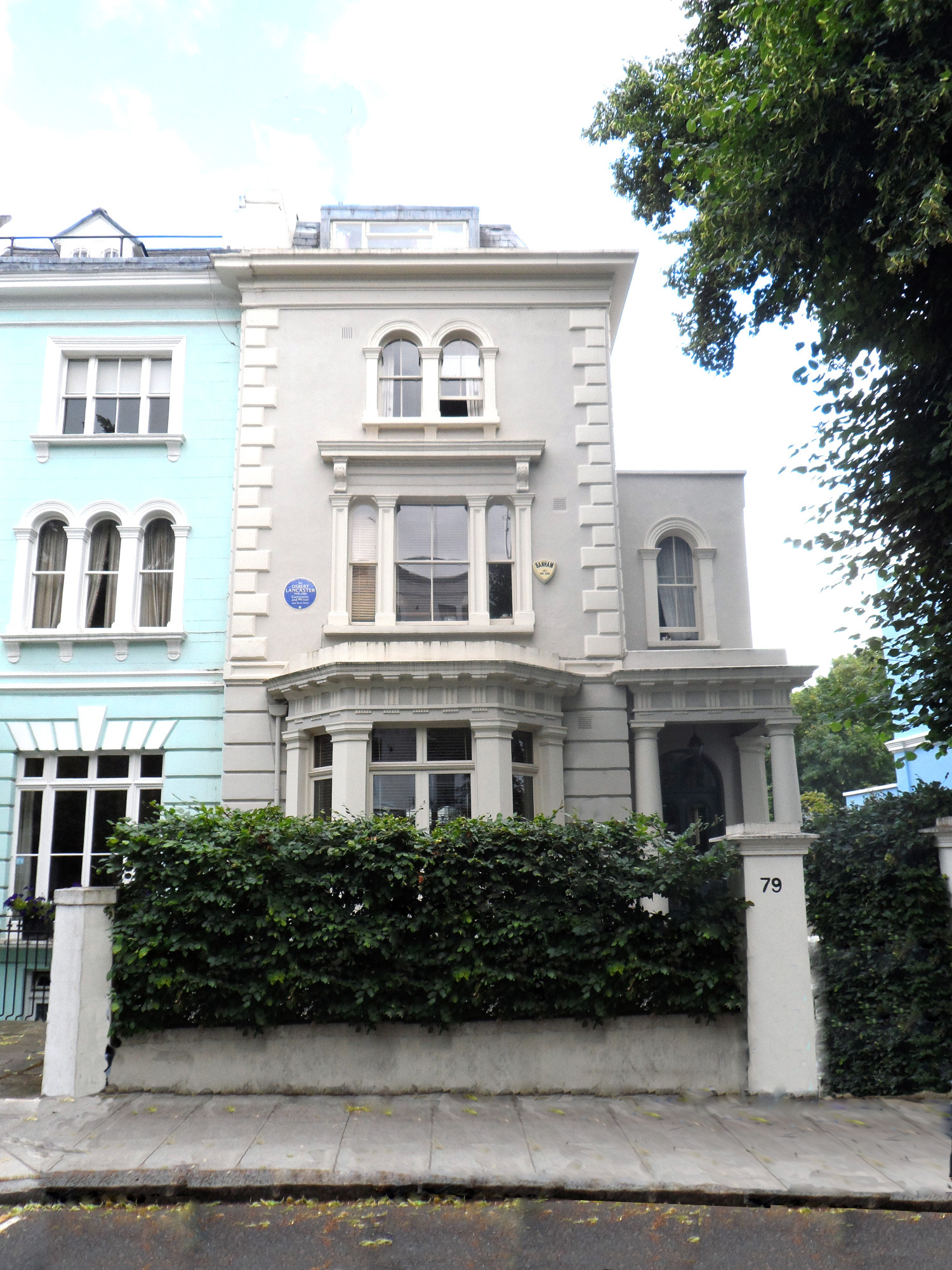
79 Elgin Crescent, home of Sir Osbert Lancaster

Elgin Crescent is a street in Notting Hill, London, England.

It runs west from Portobello Road, crosses Ladbroke Grove and at its south-western end joins Clarendon Road. The section between Portobello Road and Kensington Park Road is formed of shops, cafes and restaurants, whilst the remainder is residential.

The houses were built in the 1850s and 1860s, and most share communal gardens. Many are now listed buildings. East of Ladbroke Grove, it was originally called Elgin Road. It is named after the town of Elgin in Scotland.

== Notable residents ==
- 60 – Jawaharlal Nehru (1889–1964), First Prime Minister of India, lived there 1910–12
- 79 – Sir Osbert Lancaster (1908–1986), cartoonist, born there
- 86 – Sir Laurence Olivier (1907–1989), actor and director, lived there 1910–14
- 95 – Katherine Mansfield, New Zealand born short-story writer
- 98 - Margaret Fairchild (1911–1989), aka Miss Shepherd - The Lady in the Van - lived here in the 1950s with her mother
- 106 – John Alexander Fladgate (1809–1901), a port wine merchant, lived and died there
- 121 – Amy Clarke (1892–1980), mystical poet and writer, born there
- Boris Johnson, prime minister of the United Kingdom (former resident)
- Rachel Johnson, journalist and author
- Sax Rohmer, author, creator of Dr Fu Manchu
- General Sir Hugh Stockwell lived there
