= Oxovitisin A =

- Chemical structure of oxovitisin A

Names
- IUPAC name 7-hydroxy-3-(4-hydroxy-3,5-dimethoxyphenyl)-4-[(2S,3R,4S,5S,6R)-3,4,5-trihydroxy-6-(hydroxymethyl)oxan-2-yl]oxy-2,8-dioxatricyclo[7.3.1.0^{5,13}]trideca-1(12),3,5(13),6,9-pentaen-11-one
- Other names Pyranone-malvidin-3-glucoside

Identifiers
3D model (JSmol)	Interactive image
ChemSpider	129562368
PubChem CID	136740013
- InChI: InChI=1S/C25H24O13/c1-33-14-3-9(4-15(34-2)19(14)29)23-24(38-25-22(32)21(31)20(30)16(8-26)37-25)11-7-17(28)35-12-5-10(27)6-13(36-23)18(11)12/h3-7,16,20-22,25-26,28-32H,8H2,1-2H3/t16-,20-,21+,22-,25+/m1/s1 Key: ZHRWIFDUQBVARB-DCNRUEEBSA-N
- SMILES: COC1=CC(=CC(=C1O)OC)C2=C(C3=C4C(=CC(=O)C=C4O2)OC(=C3)O)O[C@H]5[C@@H]([C@H]([C@@H]([C@H](O5)CO)O)O)O

Properties
Chemical formula	C_{25}H_{24}O_{13}
Molar mass	532.454 g·mol^{−1}
- Except where otherwise noted, data are given for materials in their standard state (at 25 °C [77 °F], 100 kPa). Infobox references

Oxovitisin A is an oxovitisin, a type of pyranoanthocyanin with a 2-pyrone component. It is found in aged port wines. It does not contain an oxonium ion component (flavylium cation), as anthocyanins do. Therefore, it does not have an absorption maximum at 520 nm. Oxovitisins are stable yellowish pigments with similar unique spectral features, displaying only a pronounced broad band around 370 nm in the UV−vis spectrum. It is an oxidative derivative of vitisin A (carboxypyranomalvidin-3-glucoside).
