= Symington family =

The Symington family may refer to

- Symington family (United States), a family of American politicians
- Symington Family Estates, a family of British port wine makers
