= Port Cockburn =

Port Cockburn may refer to several places:

- Port Cockburn, Northern Territory, Australia
- Port Cockburn, Ontario, Canada

== See also ==
- Cockburn's Port House, a port wine producer in Portugal
