= Churchill's Port =

Portuguese port wine company

- Location: Porto, Portugal
- Founded: 1981
- Key people: John Graham
- Known for: Port wine
- Varietals: Vintage-dated ports, Late bottled vintage (LBV), White port, Tawny ports
- Website: Official website

Churchill's Port is a port wine company based in Porto, founded in 1981 by John Graham, who named the company after his wife, Caroline Churchill.

The company targets the British market with small quantities of distinctive wines including vintage-dated ports, late bottled vintage port (LBV), finest reserve and the wines known as "Churchill's Estates" which developed to include 10- and 20-year-old tawny ports.

== Origins ==
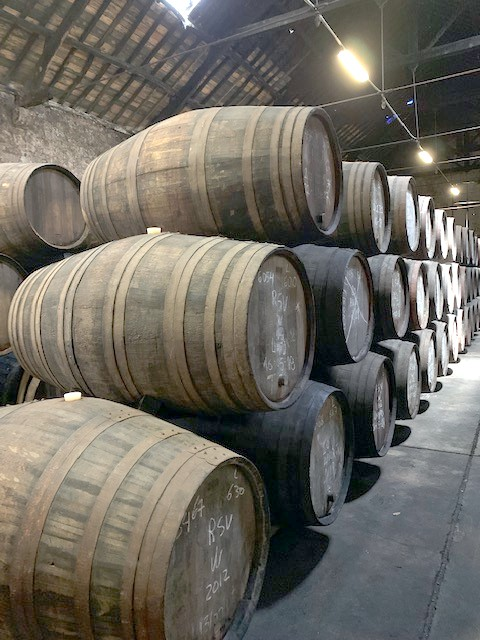
Churchill's port ageing in small oak casks

Churchill's Port was founded in 1981 by John (Johnny) Graham and his two brothers Anthony and William of the Graham's Port family who have produced wine from the Douro Valley for over 200 years. He arrived in Porto in 1973 and since his family had sold their family port business to the Symington Family Estates three years earlier, he began his career in the port business by working for Cockburn's Port House, eventually becoming a director by the age of 28. Unable to use the family name, he founded a new company named "Churchill Graham, Lda", after his wife Caroline Churchill. It was the first Port company established for 50 years. He also worked for Taylor's and rented their lodge in Vila Nova de Gaia, where their port is stored.

By 1999, sourcing the best grapes became a problem following the death of wine maker Borges de Sousa, who had given Churchill the first pick of grapes from their vineyards for almost 20 years. As a result, Churchill's looked to buy their own vineyard. Rather than look to the north bank of the Douro, where their previous grapes had been sourced, they purchased a 100-hectare property, Quinta da Gricha, on the south bank adjacent to Roriz in the Cima Corgo. They then bought the 12-hectare Quinto do Rio in the Torro valley.

== Range of wine ==
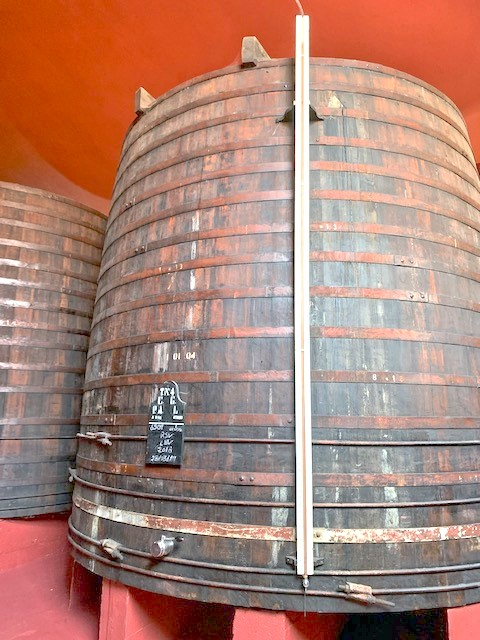
Port ageing in a large wooden vat

Eleven vintages have been declared since its first in 1982.

Churchill's range includes vintage-dated ports and vintage port from the Quinto do Rio in the Torro valley, finest reserve, and the wines known as "Churchill's Estates" which developed to include 10 and 20-year old tawny ports. They also offer a white port.

== Production ==
To avoid the bitterness of broken pips, they use traditional methods of production, such as grape treading with feet. Natural fermentation is employed and in addition, they use only small amounts of brandy.

Aimed at the British market, Churchill's have been noted for their small quantities of characteristic wines. Since its first year of production, Churchill's has declared 11 vintages.

== Other activities ==
Johnny Graham's son Max, later founded Churchill's Port House, at 26 Greek Street, London.
