= Graham's =

Portuguese producer of wine

W. & J. Graham's
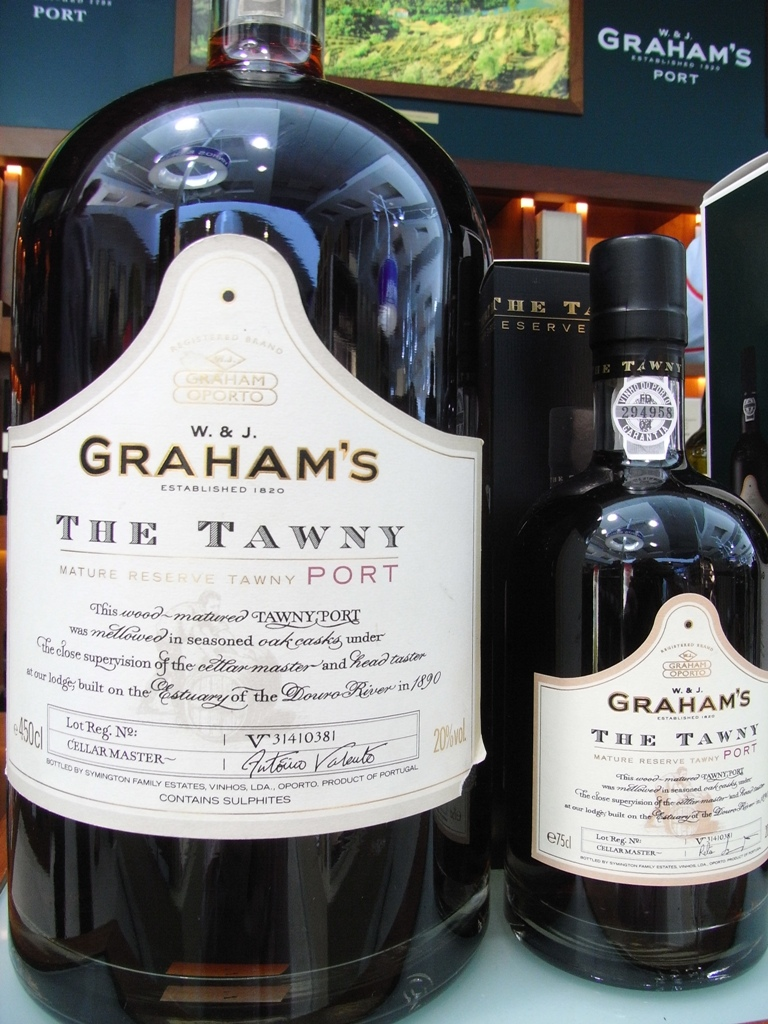
- Graham's tawny port
- Trade name: Graham's
- Industry: Food industry
- Founded: 1820 in Porto, Portugal
- Founders: William and John Graham
- Headquarters: Vila Nova de Gaia, Portugal
- Products: Port wine
- Parent: Symington Family Estates
- Website: www.grahams-port.com

W. & J. Graham's, or simply Graham's, is a producer of port wine. It is one of the most important of the port names and it is necessary for Graham's to declare a vintage for the year to be considered vintage by the port industry. Founded in 1820 as a consequence of the Graham family firm receiving a load of Portuguese wine as payment for a debt, the Graham's port business continues to operate today under the ownership of the Symington Family Estates who purchased the brand in 1970. As well as vintage port, Graham's produces a range of wines, including Six Grapes, a reserve port, Quinta dos Malvedos, named after the estate purchased by the company in 1890, and various single harvest ports, including the 1882 Ne Oublie Tawny, named after the Graham family motto and at the time one of the most expensive wines for sale. The company received a Royal Warrant in 2015.

== History ==
William Graham set up a trading company in Glasgow in 1784, and over the following decade developed as a textile and dry goods exporting enterprise. In 1820, his son John accepted twenty-seven pipes of Portuguese port wine in place of a debt. The shipment was sent back to Glasgow, the first time Port had arrived at the port. The new venture proved successful and, in the 1880s, trade was sufficient that William and John spun out W. & J. Graham to serve the new market. The company purchased the Quinta dos Malvedos vineyards in 1890, securing its own supply of grapes.

By the 1960s, like many old port names, Graham's was in financial difficulty. The Grahams sold the company to the Symington family in 1970. The Symingtons had a long association with the firm, Andrew James Symington joining the textile side of the business in 1882 before leaving to become a partner in the port factory Warre & Co in 1905. The Graham family has remained in the port business, as brothers Anthony, Jonny and William created Churchill Graham in 1981. Jonny continued the company, subsequently known as Churchill's Port. Quinta dos Malvedos was repurchased in 1982 in a poor state, but was revived and has become a key part of the Graham estate. In 2015, the company received a Royal Warrant to supply port to Queen Elizabeth. More recently, the company has released a range of ports designed for non-traditional drinkers under the Blend brand.

== Products ==
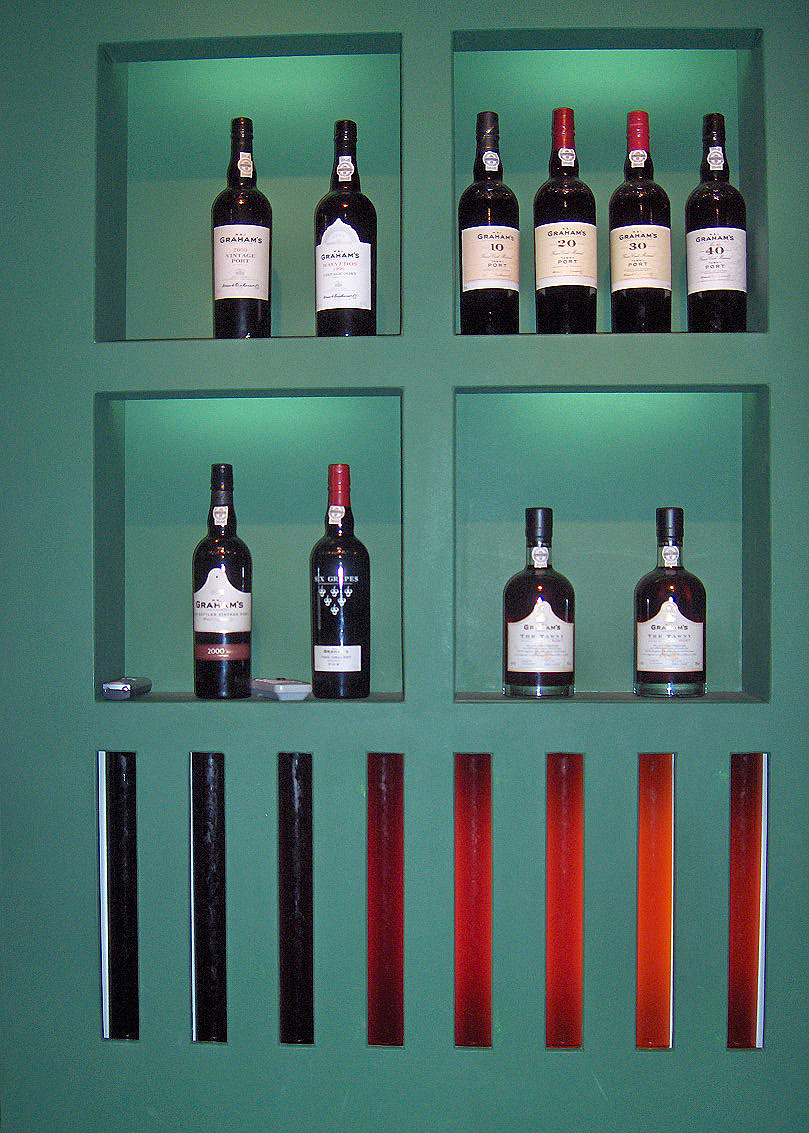
A selection of Graham's ports

- Blend N°5 - A white port released in 2019 restricted to 6,000 bottles and designed to accompany tonic water.
- Blend N°12 - A ruby port designed for bar drinkers released in 2021.
- LBV or Late Bottled Vintage - From grapes grown in the same vineyards as the Vintage port, laid in casks for four years and bottled to be drunk rather than stored. It is described by Richard Mayson as "consistently good".
- Quinta dos Malvedos - a single Quinta port, the vintage port for undeclared years.
- Six Grapes - The company's reserve port. It has been described by Robert Parker as the "sweetest and fruitiest" of the reserve ports.
- Tawny - Wood-aged port. The company also releases single harvest tawnys or colheita. In 2014, the company released 656 decanters of an 1882 Tawny Port named Ne Oublie, named after the Graham family motto, at a cost of €5,500, at the time, one of the most expensive wines sold.
- Vintage - Considered amongst the first tier of port wines. Particular vintages of note include 1948, 1963 and 1985. Graham's is one of the firms, along with Dow, Fonseca, Warre and others, that have to declare a vintage for a year to be declared "vintage" by the Portuguese port industry.

== Locations ==
Graham's is based around the Douro in Portugal, with a factory in Villa Nova de Gaia called Graham's Lodge which includes cellars that can be toured and a principle production location at Quinta dos Malvedos. The company also sources from Quinta da Vila Velha and also continues to use Quinta das Lagas, which was a source of grapes during the time that it did not have access to Quinta dos Malvedos. In 2017, the company purchased its first vineyard outside the Douro region, in Portalegre, in the Alto Alentejo region of Portugal.
