= Rabelo boat =

Portuguese wooden cargo boat

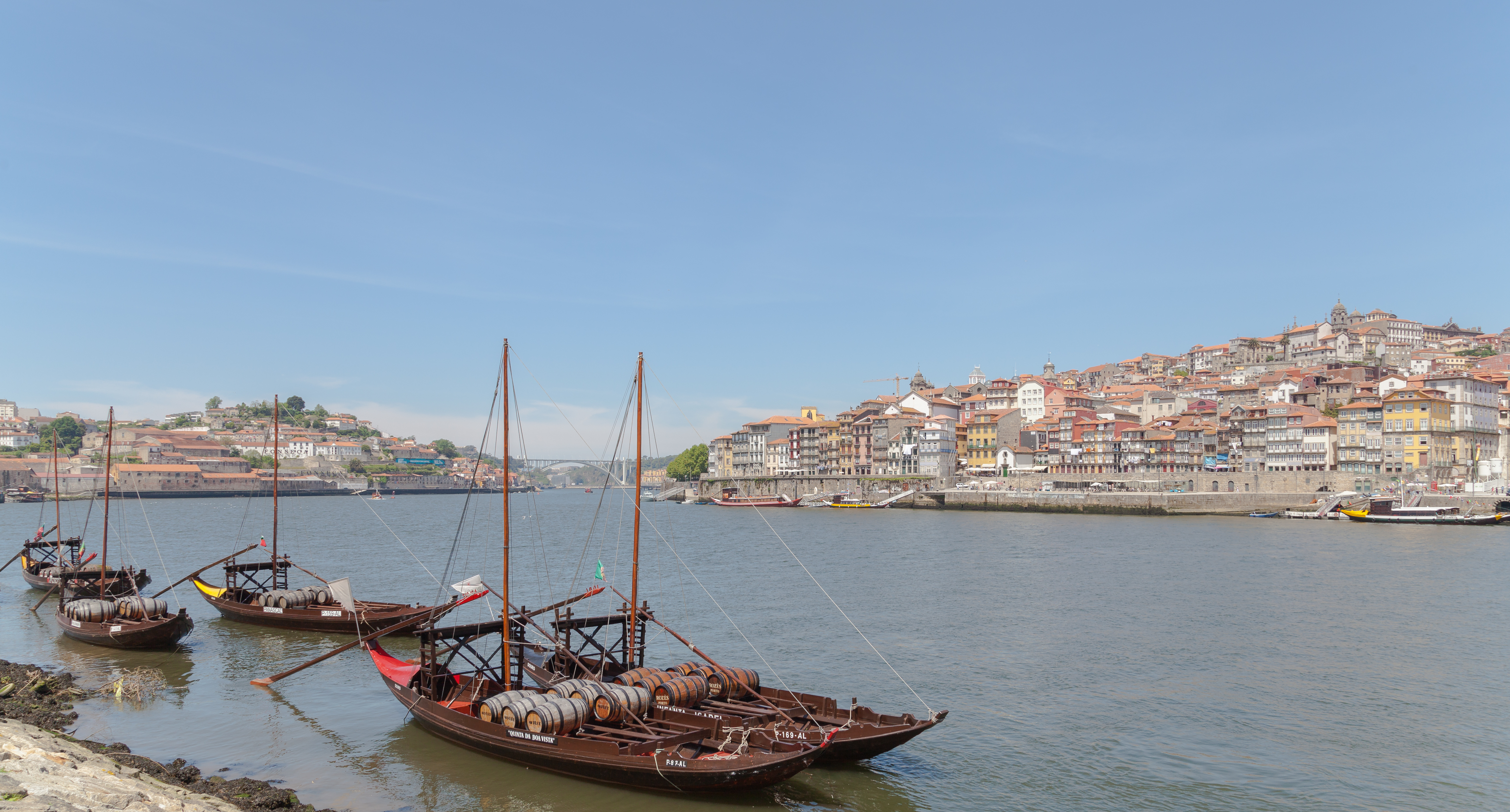
The Rabelo boat, used to transport port wine from the Douro Valley to the cellars near the city of Porto.

The rabelo boat (Portuguese: [ʁɐˈβe.lu]) is a traditional Portuguese wooden cargo boat that was used for centuries to transport people and goods along the Douro River. It is flat-bottomed, with a shallow draught, which was necessary to navigate the often shallow fast-flowing waters of the upper Douro prior to the construction of dams and locks from 1968 onwards.

Native to the Douro region, it does not exist in any other place in the world. Its history is closely linked to the production and trade of port wine. Before the arrival of the Linha do Douro railway, the rabelo was the fastest and the most efficient means of transport between the Douro Valley, where port wine is produced, and the city of Porto, where it was traded and exported worldwide.

The name rabelo means 'little tail', on account of the long timber projection from the rear of the boat which is used to steer the vessel. Although not in commercial use anymore, these vessels may still be seen, belonging to port wine companies, along the river in Porto and Gaia.

Every year on June 24, St John's Day, a race of rabelo boats is held, an important and popular part of the festivities of Porto, the Festa de São João do Porto.
