= Oxovitisin =

Chemical structure of oxovitisin A

Oxovitisins are a type of pyranoanthocyanin with a pyranone (2-pyrone) component found in aged port wines. They do not contain an oxonium ion component (flavylium cation), as anthocyanins do. Therefore, they do not have an absorption maximum at 520 nm. Oxovitisins are stable yellowish pigments with similar unique spectral features, displaying only a pronounced broad band around 370 nm in the UV−vis spectrum.

== Examples ==
- Oxovitisin A (pyranone-malvidin-3-glucoside)
- Pyranone-malvidin-3-coumaroylglucoside
