= Pinotin =

Pinotin A, pyranoanthocyanin

Pinotins are a type of pyranoanthocyanins, a class of phenolic compounds found in red wine. One such compound is pinotin A.

== See also ==
- Wine color
