= Pinotin A =

- Chemical structure of pinotin A

Identifiers
CAS Number	663910-41-6
3D model (JSmol)	Interactive image
ChemSpider	10286568
PubChem CID	21674154
- InChI: InChI=1S/C31H28O14/c1-40-21-6-13(7-22(41-2)25(21)36)29-30(45-31-28(39)27(38)26(37)23(11-32)44-31)15-10-18(12-3-4-16(34)17(35)5-12)42-19-8-14(33)9-20(43-29)24(15)19/h3-10,23,26-28,31-32,37-39H,11H2,1-2H3,(H3-,33,34,35,36)/p+1/t23-,26-,27+,28-,31+/m1/s1 Key: RFTHDRVOYDHSOC-BGXVWEPQSA-O
- SMILES: COc1cc(cc(c1O)OC)c2c(c3c4c([o+]2)cc(cc4OC(=C3)c5ccc(c(c5)O)O)O)O[C@H]6[C@@H]([C@H]([C@@H]([C@H](O6)CO)O)O)O

Properties
Chemical formula	C_{31}H_{29}O_{14}+
Molar mass	625.55 g/mol
- Except where otherwise noted, data are given for materials in their standard state (at 25 °C [77 °F], 100 kPa). verify (what is ?) Infobox references

Pinotin A is a pinotin, a type of pyranoanthocyanins and a class of phenolic compounds found in red wine.

== See also ==
- Pinotin A aglycone
- Phenolic content in wine
