= Portisin =

Class of chemical compounds

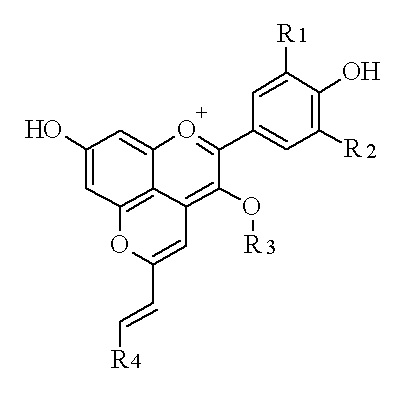
General structure of portisins, with R1 being O-CH3, R2 being O-CH3, OH or H, R3 being glucose, coumaroylglucose or acetylglucose and R4 being catechin, phenol or a procyanidin dimer.

Portisins are vinylpyranoanthocyanins, a type of blueish phenolic pigments, found in aged port wine.

== See also ==
- Wine color
