= Vitisin B (pyranoanthocyanin) =

- Chemical structure of vitisin B

Names
- IUPAC name 3-(β-D-Glucopyranosyloxy)-4′,7-dihydroxy-3′,5′-dimethoxypyrano[4′′,3′′,2′′:4,5]flavylium
- Systematic IUPAC name 8-Hydroxy-2-(4-hydroxy-3,5-dimethoxyphenyl)-3-{[(2S,3R,4S,5S,6R)-3,4,5-trihydroxy-6-(hydroxymethyl)oxan-2-yl]oxy}-1λ^{4}-pyrano[4,3,2-de][1]benzopyran-1-ylium
- Other names Pyranomalvidin-3-glucoside

Identifiers
CAS Number	184362-10-5
3D model (JSmol)	Interactive image
ChEBI	CHEBI:147426
ChemSpider	58191428
PubChem CID	44195285
UNII	C3JJ5TC7LJ
CompTox Dashboard (EPA)	DTXSID301311376
- InChI: InChI=1S/C25H24O12/c1-32-15-5-10(6-16(33-2)19(15)28)23-24(37-25-22(31)21(30)20(29)17(9-26)36-25)12-3-4-34-13-7-11(27)8-14(35-23)18(12)13/h3-8,17,20-22,25-26,29-31H,9H2,1-2H3,(H-,27,28)/p+1/t17-,20-,21+,22-,25+/m1/s1 Key: ZFFLAEFKTXRRFR-FHBCLOHASA-O; InChI=1/C25H24O12/c1-32-15-5-10(6-16(33-2)19(15)28)23-24(37-25-22(31)21(30)20(29)17(9-26)36-25)12-3-4-34-13-7-11(27)8-14(35-23)18(12)13/h3-8,17,20-22,25-26,29-31H,9H2,1-2H3,(H-,27,28)/p+1/t17-,20-,21+,22-,25+/m1/s1 Key: ZFFLAEFKTXRRFR-IPEXBSMVBT
- SMILES: COc1cc(cc(c1O)OC)c2c(c3c4c([o+]2)cc(cc4OC=C3)O)O[C@H]5[C@@H]([C@H]([C@@H]([C@H](O5)CO)O)O)O

Properties
Chemical formula	C_{25}H_{25}O_{12}^{+}
Molar mass	517.45 g/mol
- Except where otherwise noted, data are given for materials in their standard state (at 25 °C [77 °F], 100 kPa). verify (what is ?) Infobox references

Vitisin B is a natural phenol found in red wines. It is a pyranoanthocyanin.

== See also ==
- Phenolic compounds in wine
- Vitisin A (pyranoanthocyanin)
