= Vitisin A (pyranoanthocyanin) =

- Chemical structure of vitisin A

Names
- IUPAC name 5′′-Formyl-3-(β-D-glucopyranosyloxy)-4′,7-dihydroxy-3′,5′-dimethoxy-6′′-oxo-1,6′′-dihydropyrano[4′′,3′′,2′′:4,5]flavylium
- Systematic IUPAC name 3-Formyl-8-hydroxy-5-(4-hydroxy-3,5-dimethoxyphenyl)-2-oxo-4-{[(2S,3R,4S,5S,6R)-3,4,5-trihydroxy-6-(hydroxymethyl)oxan-2-yl]oxy}-2H-pyrano[4,3,2-de][1]benzopyran-6-ium
- Other names Malvidin 3-O-glucoside pyruvic acid Malvidin 3-O-glucoside pyruvic adduct 5-carboxypyranomalvidin-3-glucoside

Identifiers
CAS Number	184362-09-2
3D model (JSmol)	Interactive image
ChemSpider	8500967
PubChem CID	10325504
CompTox Dashboard (EPA)	DTXSID20438083
- InChI: InChI=1S/C26H24O14/c1-35-14-3-9(4-15(36-2)19(14)30)23-24(40-26-22(33)21(32)20(31)16(8-28)39-26)17-11(7-27)25(34)38-13-6-10(29)5-12(37-23)18(13)17/h3-7,16,20-22,26,28-33H,8H2,1-2H3/p+1/t16-,20-,21+,22-,26+/m1/s1 Key: DYYPRYJWENTOEN-DMRYIZGCSA-O
- SMILES: O=CC1=C2C3=C(OC1=O)C=C(O)C=C3[O+]([H])C(C4=CC(OC)=C(O)C(OC)=C4)=C2O[C@@H]5O[C@H](CO)[C@@H](O)[C@H](O)[C@H]5O

Properties
Chemical formula	C_{26}H_{25}O_{14}^{+}
Molar mass	561.46 g/mol
- Except where otherwise noted, data are given for materials in their standard state (at 25 °C [77 °F], 100 kPa). verify (what is ?) Infobox references

Vitisin A is a natural phenol found in red wines. It is a pyranoanthocyanin.

== See also ==
- Phenolic compounds in wine
- Vitisin B (pyranoanthocyanin)
