= Pyranoanthocyanin =

The pyranoanthocyanins are a type of pyranoflavonoids. They are chemical compounds formed in red wines by yeast during fermentation processes or during controlled oxygenation processes during the aging of wine. The different classes of pyranoanthocyanins are carboxypyranoanthocyanins, methylpyranoanthocyanins, pyranoanthocyanin-flavanols, pyranoanthocyanin-phenols, portisins, oxovitisins and pyranoanthocyanin dimers; their general structure includes an additional ring (formed between the OH group at C-5 and the C-4 of the anthocyanin pyranic ring) that may have different substituents linked directly at C-10.

== Examples ==
- Carboxypyranoanthocyanidins, can be considered markers of microoxygenation techniques
- Hydroxyphenyl-pyranoanthocyanins
- Vitisin A and B
- Pinotins
- Portosins (vinylpyranoanthocyanins)

=== Vitisin A type ===
- Cyanidin-3-O-glucoside-pyruvic acid (m/z of [M+H]+ ion:517, λmax 506 nm)
- Cyanidin-3-O-acetylglucoside-pyruvic acid (559 - 507)
- Cyanidin-coumaroylglucoside-pyruvic acid (661 - 507 nm)
- Delphinidin-3-O-glucoside-pyruvic acid (533 - 507 nm)
- Delphinidin-3-O-acetylglucoside-pyruvic acid (575 - 509 nm)
- Delphinidin-3-O-coumaroylglucoside-pyruvic acid (679 - 511 nm)
- Peonidin-3-O-glucoside-pyruvic acid (531 - 509 nm)
- Peonidin-3-O-acetylglucoside-pyruvic acid (573 - 510 nm)
- Peonidin-3-O-coumaroylglucoside-pyruvic acid (677 - 511 nm)
- Petunidin-3-O-glucoside-pyruvic acid (547 - 508 nm)
- Petunidin-3-O-acetylglucoside-pyruvic acid (589 - 509 nm)
- Petunidin-3-O-coumaroylglucoside-pyruvic acid (693 - 510 nm)
- Malvidin-3-O-glucoside-pyruvic acid (561 - 513 nm)
- Malvidin-3-O-acetylglucoside-pyruvic acid (603 - 516 nm)
- Malvidin-3-O-coumaroylglucoside-pyruvic acid (707 - 513 nm)

=== Vitisin B type ===
- Malvidin-3-O-glucoside-acetaldehyde (517 - 490 nm)
- Malvidin-3-O-acetylglucoside-acetaldehyde (559 - 494 nm)
- Malvidin-3-O-coumaroylglucoside-acetaldehyde (663 - 497 nm)

=== Oxovitisins ===
Oxovitisins are pyranone-anthocyanin derivatives

- Pyranone-malvidin-3-glucoside (Oxovitisin A)
- Pyranone-malvidin-3-coumaroylglucoside

=== Pinotin type ===
- Delphinidin-3-O-glucoside-4-vinylcatechol (597 - 510 nm)
- Delphinidin-3-O-acetylglucoside-4-vinylcatechol (639 - 512 nm)
- Delphinidin-3-O-coumaroylglucoside-4-vinylcatechol (743 - 514 nm)
- Peonidin-3-O-glucoside-4-vinylcatechol (595 - 504 nm)
- Peonidin-3-O-acetylglucoside-4-vinylcatechol (637 - 506 nm)
- Peonidin-3-O-coumaroylglucoside-4-vinylcatechol (741 - 508 nm)
- Petunidin-3-O-glucoside-4-vinylcatechol (611 - 510 nm)
- Petunidin-3-O-acetylglucoside-4-vinylcatechol (653 - 512 nm)
- Petunidin-3-O-coumaroylglucoside-4-vinylcatechol (757 - 516 nm)
- Malvidin-3-O-glucoside-4-vinylcatechol (625 - 512 nm)
- Malvidin-3-O-acetylglucoside-4-vinylcatechol (667 - 514 nm)
- Malvidin-3-O-coumaroylglucoside-4-vinylcatechol (771 - 514 nm)
- Delphinidin-3-O-glucoside-4-vinylphenol (581 - 504 nm)
- Delphinidin-3-O-acetylglucoside-4-vinylphenol (623 - 506 nm)
- Delphinidin-3-O-coumaroylglucoside-4-vinylphenol (727 - 506 nm)
- Peonidin-3-O-glucoside-4-vinylphenol (579 - 499 nm)
- Peonidin-3-O-acetylglucoside-4-vinylphenol (621 - 504 nm)
- Peonidin-3-O-coumaroylglucoside-4-vinylphenol (725 - 505 nm)
- Petunidin-3-O-glucoside-4-vinylphenol (595 - 504 nm)
- Petunidin-3-O-acetylglucoside-4-vinylphenol (636 - 506 nm)
- Petunidin-3-O-coumaroylglucoside-4-vinylphenol (741 - 507 nm)
- Malvidin-3-O-glucoside-4-vinylphenol (609 - 504 nm)
- Malvidin-3-O-acetylglucoside-4-vinylphenol (651 - 507 nm)
- Malvidin-3-O-coumaroylglucoside-4-vinylphenol (755 - 509 nm)
- Malvidin-3-O-caffeoylglucoside-4-vinylphenol (771 - 532 nm)
- Delphinidin-3-O-glucoside-4-vinylguaiacol (611 - 502 nm)
- Peonidin-3-O-glucoside-4-vinylguaiacol (609 - 499 nm)
- Petunidin-3-O-glucoside-4-vinylguaiacol (625 - 502 nm)
- Malvidin-3-O-glucoside-4-vinylguaiacol (639 - 504 nm)
- Malvidin-3-O-acetylglucoside-4-vinylguaiacol (681 - 506 nm)
- Malvidin-3-O-coumaroylglucoside-vinylguaiacol (755 477 508 nm)

=== Flavanyl-pyranoanthocyanin type ===
- Delphinidin-3-O-glucoside-4-vinyl(epi)catechin (777 - 501 nm)
- Delphinidin-3-O-acetylglucoside-4-vinyl(epi)catechin (819 - 503 nm)
- Peonidin-3-O-glucoside-4-vinyl(epi)catechin (775 - 199 nm)
- Peonidin-3-O-acetylglucoside-4-vinyl(epi)catechin (817 - 501 nm)
- Petunidin-3-O-glucoside-4-vinyl(epi)catechin (791 - 502 nm)
- Petunidin-3-O-acetylglucoside-4-vinyl(epi)catechin (833 - 504 nm)
- Malvidin-3-O-glucoside-4-vinyl(epi)catechin (805 - 503 nm)
- Malvidin-3-O-acetylglucoside-4-vinyl(epi)catechin (847 - 508 nm)
- Malvidin-3-O-coumaroylglucoside-4-vinyl(epi)catechin (951 - 503 nm)

== See also ==
- Phenolic compounds in wine
