= Symington Family Estates =

Wine company and port wine house in Portugal

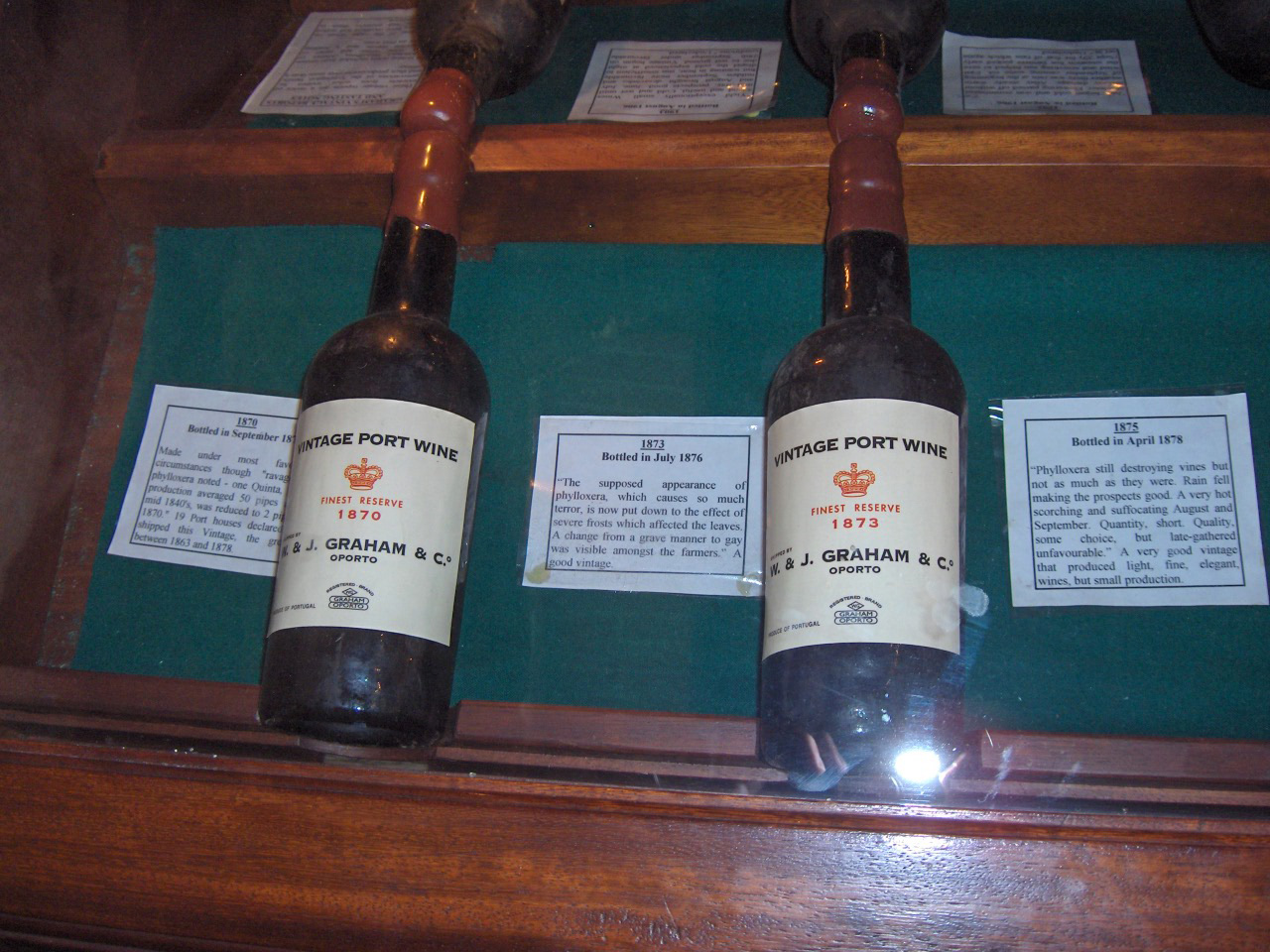
Vintage Graham's port produced by the Symingtons

Symington Family Estates is a wine company and port wine house in Portugal, which owns and operates several vineyards and wineries and owns several brands of Port, Madeira wine and Douro DOC wines, including some of the oldest and most well-known Port and Madeira brands. With their extensive vineyard holdings and many Port brands, the Symingtons are often described as being a "Port empire".

The companies owned by Symington Family Estates and individual family members together own 27 quintas (estates) in the Alto Douro region, and additionally lease one and operate one as a joint venture. These 25 quintas together have 940 hectares (2,300 acres) of vineyards. Over 70% of the Port wine sold by Symington-owned brands is produced from grapes from these vineyards. Together with these land holdings, the Symingtons are the largest vineyard ownership group in the Douro.

The Symington family are members of the association Primum Familiae Vini.

== History ==
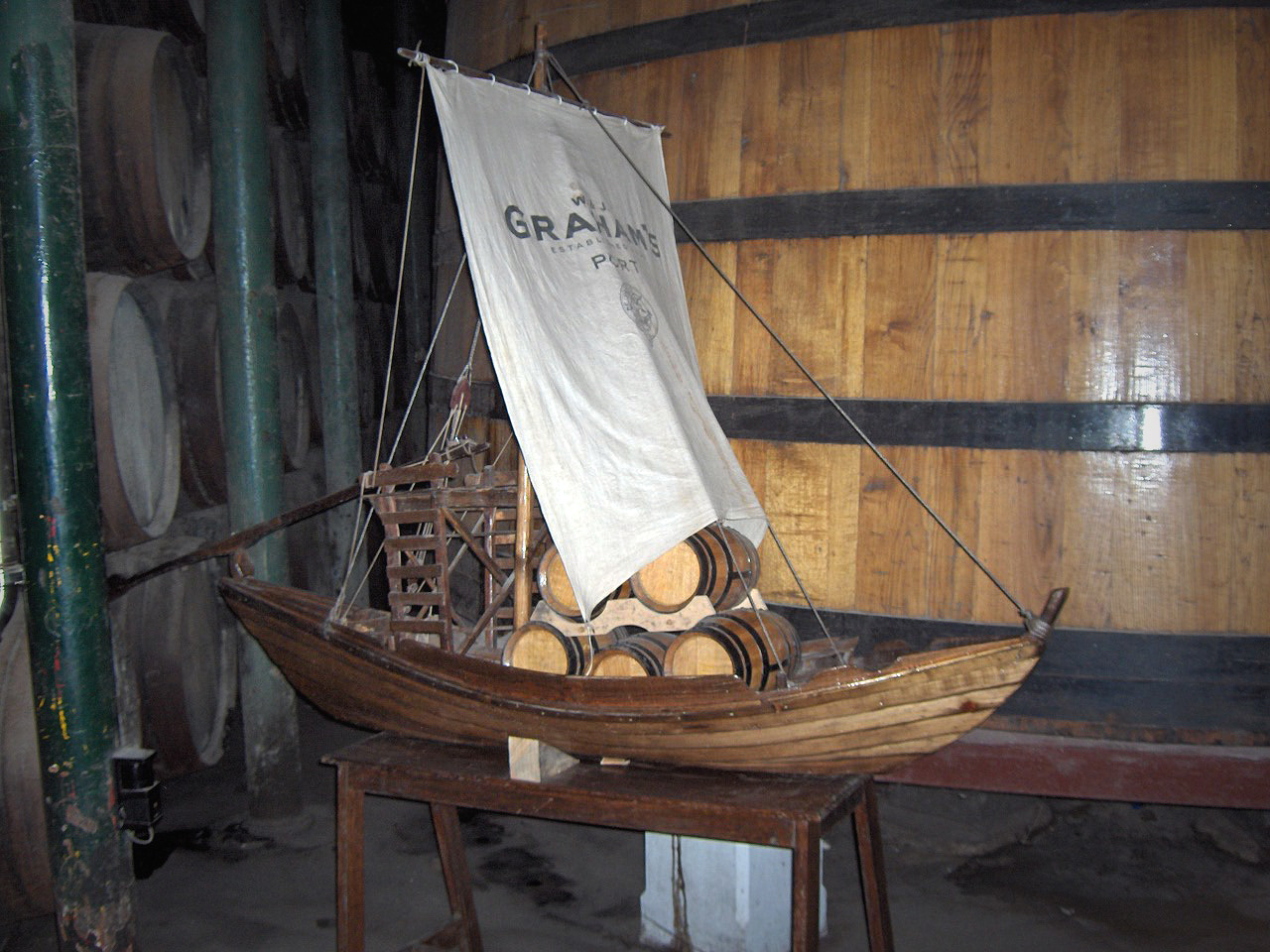
A model of a rabelo used to transport the wine along the Douro featured in the Symington Family Estate cellar of Graham's

The company was founded by Andrew James Symington who arrived in Porto from Scotland in 1882, and initially joined Graham's. In 1891 he married Beatrice Atkinson, who was descended from several generations of port wine shippers and producers, the oldest known of which was Walter Maynard, who is known to have shipped port wine already in 1652.

By 1905, Andrew James Symington was a partner of Warre & Co and in 1912 he became a partner in Dow's Port. In 1970, the Symington family bought both Graham's and Smith Woodhouse.

In 1989, the Symington family became a partner of the Madeira Wine Company (MWC), which at that time was controlled by the Blandy family behind Blandy's, one of the Madeira companies which had formed MWC. In 1989, the Symingtons also bought Quinta do Vesuvio, which they consider the finest Port quinta from the Ferreira family, which had run into economic troubles. This quinta was used to introduce a high end single-quinta port in the Symington range.

From 1999, dry Douro wines were added to the Symington range, and in 2001, the prestige brand Chryseia was added.

== Wineries and brands owned ==
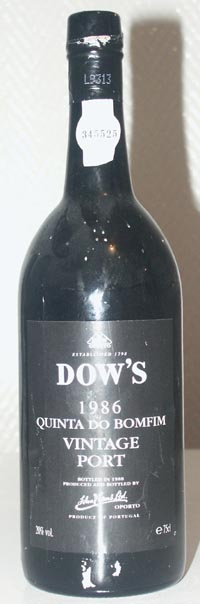
Dow's is another brand in the Symington Family portfolio.

The wineries and brands owned by Symington Family Estates are the following:

=== Port wine ===
- Graham's (established in 1820)
- Warre's
- Dow's
- Cockburn's
- Smith Woodhouse
- Quinta do Vesuvio
- Gould Campbell
- Quarles Harris
- Martinez

=== Douro wine ===
- Chryseia
- Altano
- Quinta de Roriz

Prazo de Roriz
