= Cockburn's Port House =

Wine producer in Portugal

Cockburn's Port (/ˈkoʊbɜːrnz/ KOH-burnz) is a port wine producer in Portugal.

Cockburn's was set up by Scotsman Robert Cockburn in 1815, who returned to Portugal after first visiting the country as a soldier fighting under Wellington in the Napoleonic Wars. It later became a major brand of port in the 19th and 20th centuries.

In 1962, the family sold the company to Harvey's of Bristol, which itself then became part of Allied Domecq until 2005, when Allied Domecq was taken over by Pernod Ricard, which sold Cockburn's and some other brands to the Fortune Brands holding company (the parent company of Beam Global). In 2010, Cockburn's was sold to Symington Family Estates, a family-owned business with over 1,006 hectares (2,400 acres) of vineyards in the Douro Valley.

== See also ==
- Churchill's Port
