= Taylor, Fladgate, & Yeatman =

Portuguese port wine company

Coordinates: 41°8′2″N 8°36′52″W

Taylor, Fladgate & Yeatman
- Location: Vila Nova de Gaia, Portugal
- Founded: 1692
- Known for: Port
- Distribution: International

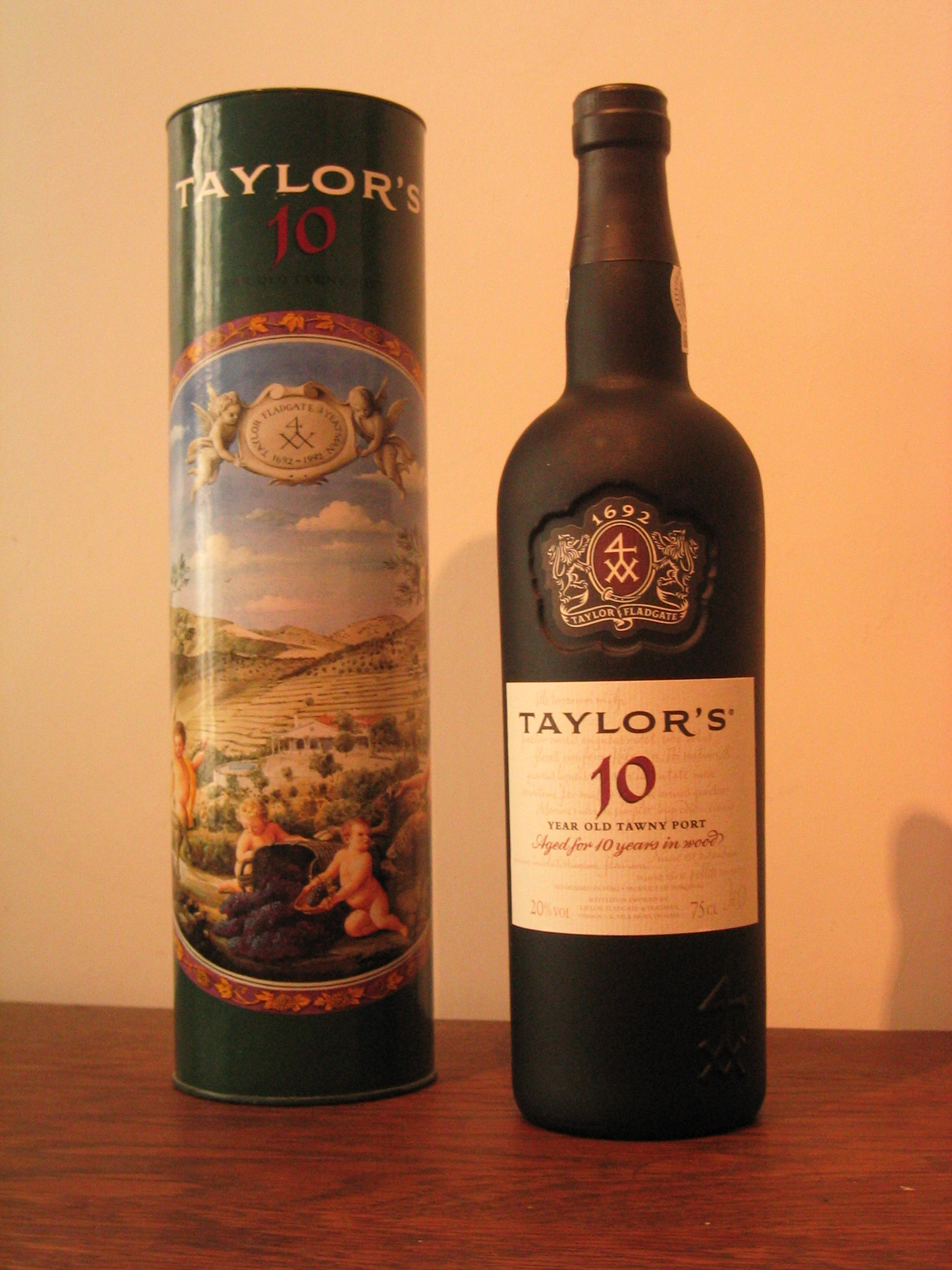
A 10-year-old Tawny port from Taylor's.

Taylor, Fladgate & Yeatman (often simply Taylor Fladgate and trading under the name Taylor's) is one of the largest port wine houses. Founded in 1692 in Vila Nova de Gaia, Portugal by Job Bearsley, becoming Taylor, Fladgate & Yeatman when Joseph Taylor, John Alexander Fladgate and Morgan Yeatman formed a partnership in 1838, it is also one of the oldest.

The Taylor Fonseca Group formed with the merger of the Taylor's and Fonseca Guimaraens port houses. After the purchase of C&D Vintners from Diageo the Fladgate Partnership was formed owning the brands of Taylor, Fonseca, Croft, Delaforce and Krohn. The Delaforce and Krohn brands were later sold. The house ships almost all types of port including vintage, tawny, ruby, white, dry white, late-bottled vintage, Aged Tawnies and Very Very old Ports. The house invented the style of late-bottled vintage port.

In August 2023, it was announced Taylor Fladgate had acquired the assets, stock and Minho, Dão and Bairrada estates of the Portuguese wine company, Ideal Drinks.
