= Port wine =

Portuguese fortified wine

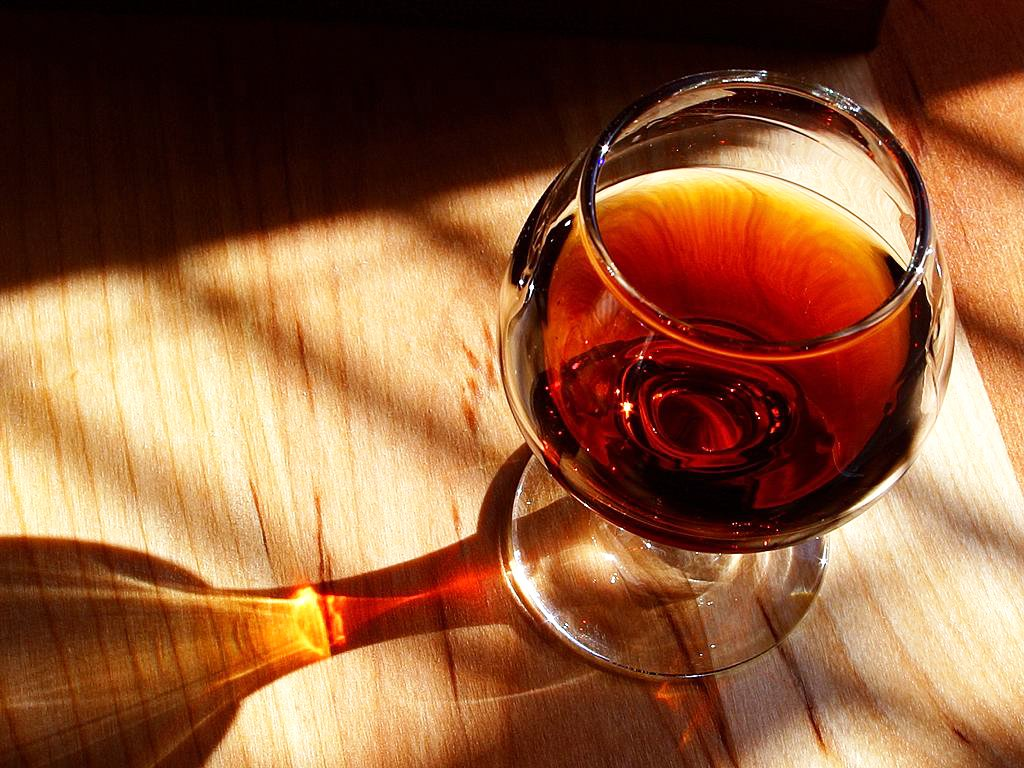
A glass of port

Port wine (Portuguese: vinho do Porto, Portuguese: [ˈviɲu ðu ˈpoɾtu]; lit. 'wine of Porto'), or simply port, is a Portuguese fortified wine produced in the Douro Valley of northern Portugal. It is typically a sweet red wine, often served with dessert, although it also comes in dry, semi-dry, and white varieties.

Port wine is different from other wines because of its distinctive winemaking method: the early interruption of the wine's fermentation process via the introduction of a neutral grape spirit. This process gives Port unique characteristics including an intense taste and aroma, rich fruit flavors, typically elevated sweetness and a relatively high alcohol content, usually between 19% and 22% by volume.

There are many types of Ports, the primary categories of red Ports are Ruby and Tawny. Ruby Ports are younger, being aged only a few years or less - they include regular Ruby Ports (often called "Fine Ruby"), Ruby Reserve Ports, Late Bottled Vintage Ports, Crusted Ports, and Vintage Ports. Tawny Ports are aged in barrel for typically much longer before release and, with the exception of the least-aged tawny Ports, have an indication of age in 10 year increments between 10 to 50 years. Colheitas are also a type of tawny Port, which are a barrel-aged Port made from grapes of a single year's harvest.

White Ports are made from a different set of grapes than red Ports. There are regular, young White Ports (often called "Fine White"), White Reserve Ports, barrel-aged White Ports with indication of age in the same manner as tawny Ports, and White Colheitas.

Red Ports come in various shades such as tawny, golden and light gold, while white Ports range from pale yellow, straw and golden white.

In the European Union as well as in the United States, only wines from Portugal are allowed to be labelled "port".

== History ==
In 1678, a Liverpool wine merchant sent two new representatives to Viana do Castelo, north of Oporto, to learn the wine trade. While on a vacation in the Douro, the two gentlemen visited the Abbot of Lamego, who treated them to a "very agreeable, sweetish and extremely smooth" wine, which had been fortified with a distilled spirit. The two Englishmen were so pleased with the product that they purchased the abbot's entire lot and shipped it home.

Port became very popular in England after the Methuen Treaty of 1703, when merchants were permitted to import it at a low duty, while war with France deprived English wine drinkers of French wine. British importers could be credited for recognising that a smooth, already fortified wine that would appeal to English palates would survive the trip to London.

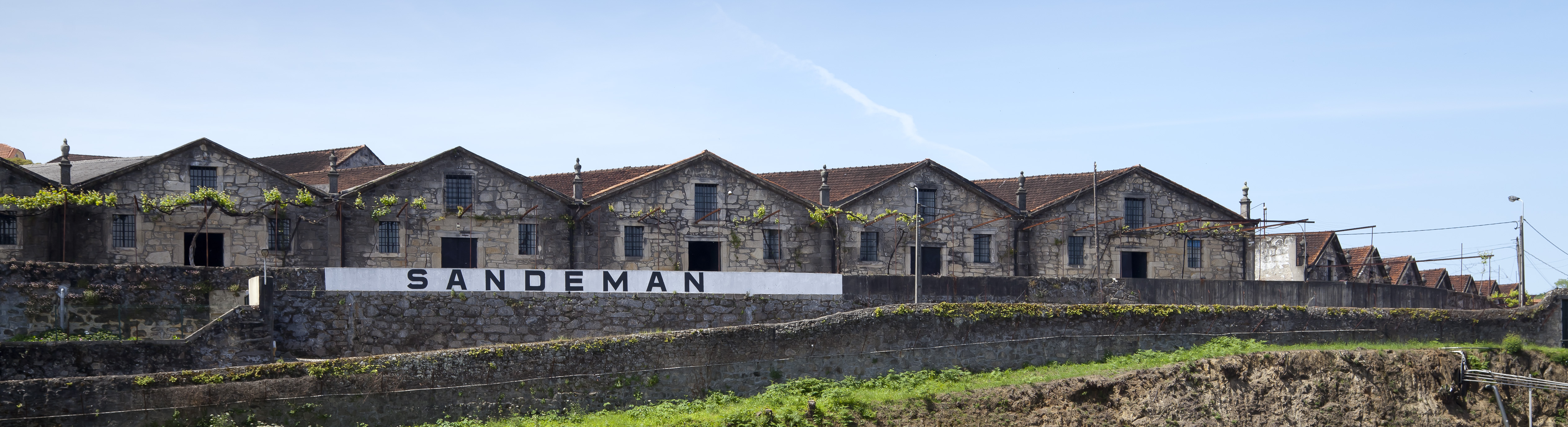
Sandeman cellar, Vila Nova de Gaia, Portugal

The continued British involvement in the port trade can be seen in the names of many port shippers and brands: Broadbent, Cockburn, Croft, Dow, Gould Campbell, Graham, Osborne, Offley, Sandeman, Taylor, and Warre being amongst the best known. Shippers of Dutch and German origin are also prominent, such as Niepoort and Burmester. The British involvement grew so strong that they formed a trade association that became a gentlemen's club. A few port shippers and producers were also established by native Portuguese families: Ferreira and Quinta do Crasto are among the best. Both Ferreira and Quinta do Crasto can be credited for pioneering the Douro as a table-wine-producing region, Ferreira making Barca Velha since 1952 and Quinta do Crasto becoming the second producer of note, starting in the early 1990s.

== Region and production ==
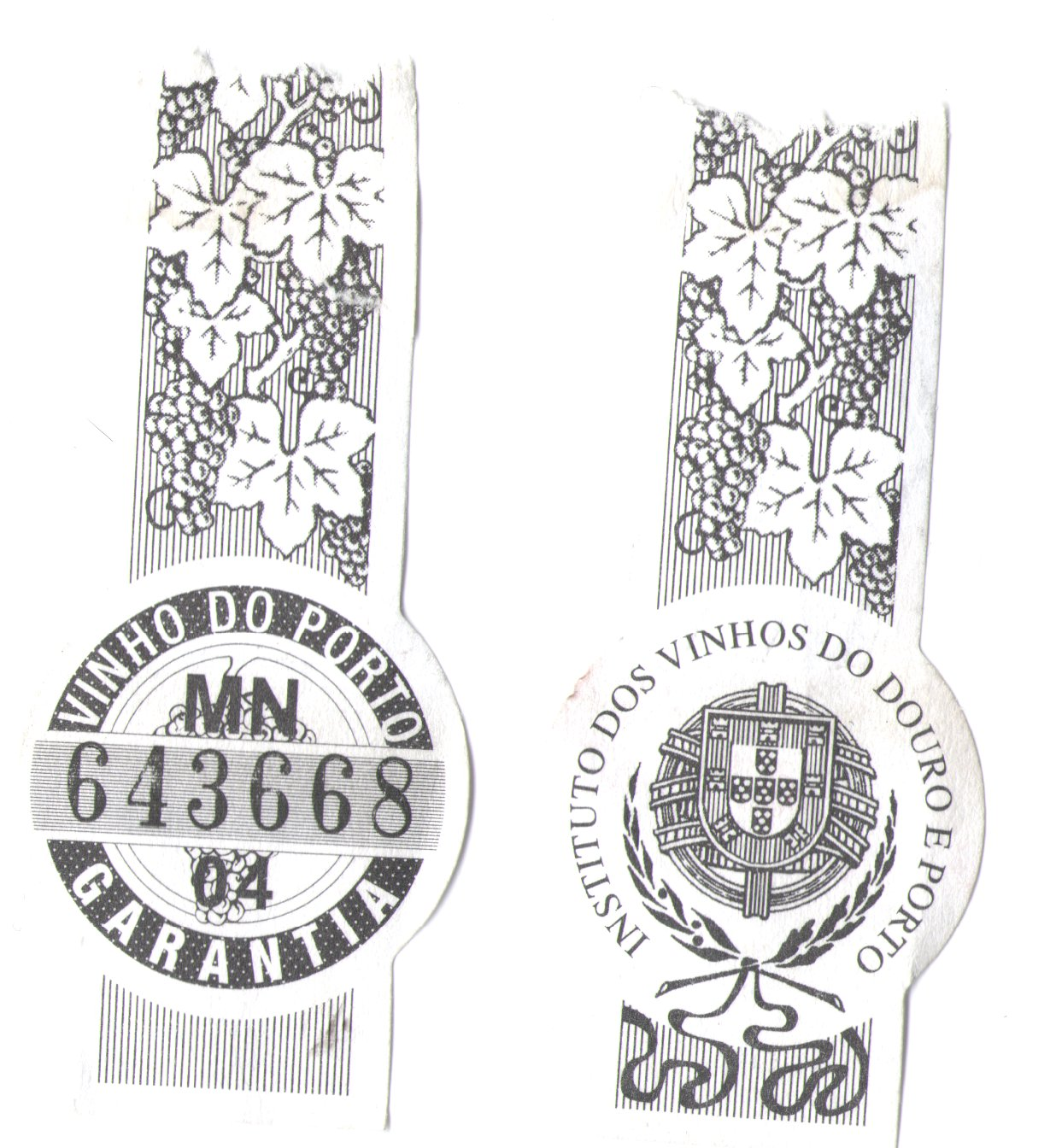
Official guarantee label from a bottle of port

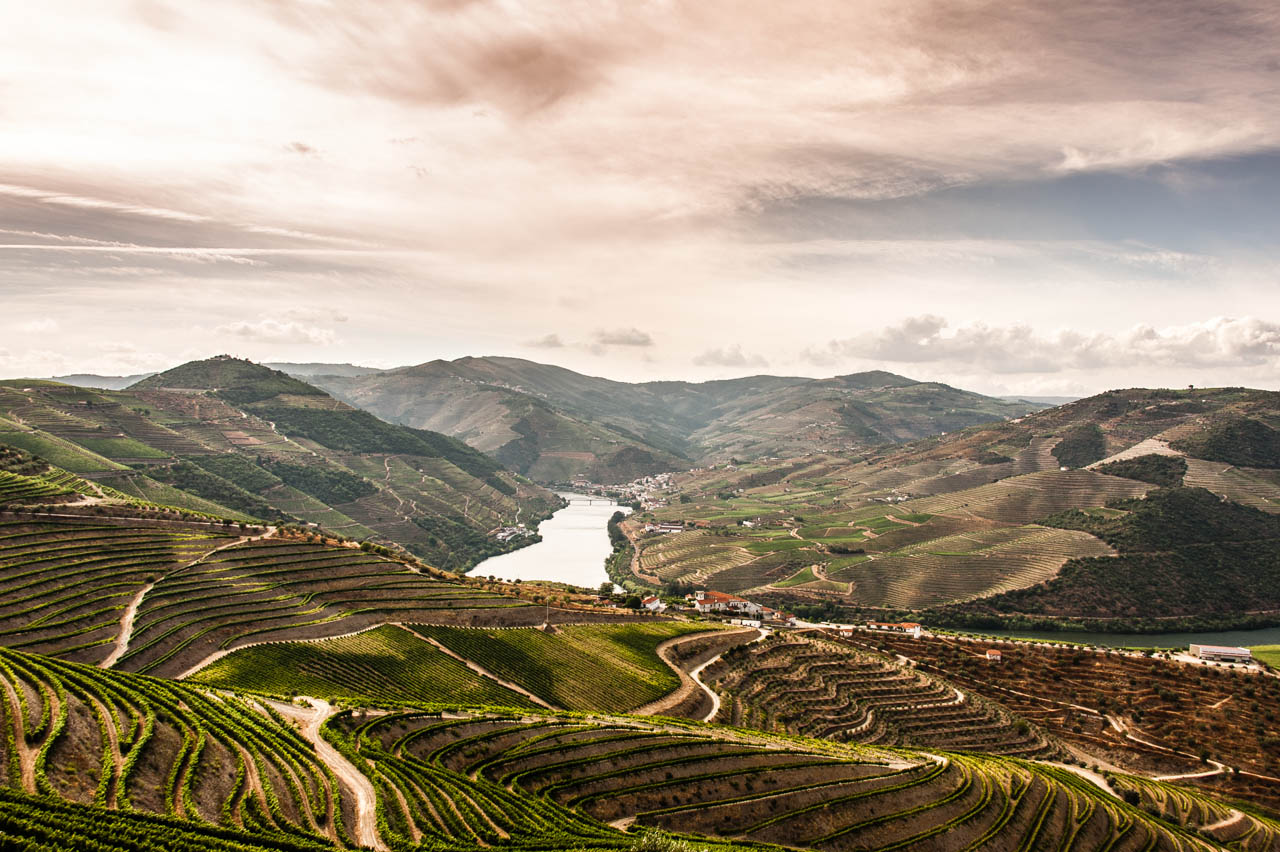
The vineyards that produce port wine are common along the hillsides that flank the valley of the River Douro in northern Portugal.

Port is produced from grapes grown and processed in the demarcated Douro region. The wine produced is then fortified by the addition of a neutral grape spirit known as aguardente to stop the fermentation, leaving residual sugar in the wine, and to boost the alcohol content. The fortification spirit is sometimes referred to as brandy, but it bears little resemblance to commercial brandies. The wine is then stored and aged, often in barrels stored in a lodge (meaning "cellar") as is the case in Vila Nova de Gaia, before being bottled. The wine received its name, "port", in the latter half of the 17th century from the seaport city of Porto at the mouth of the Douro River, where much of the product was brought to market or for export to other countries in Europe. The Douro valley where port wine is produced was defined and established as a protected region, and the name Douro thus an official appellation, in 1756, making it the third oldest wine after Chianti (1716) and Tokaj (1730).

The reaches of the valley of the Douro River in northern Portugal have a microclimate that is optimal for cultivation of olives, almonds, and especially grapes important for making port wine. The region around Pinhão and São João da Pesqueira is considered to be the centre of port production, and is known for its picturesque quintas – estates clinging on to almost vertical slopes dropping down to the river.

The wine-producing Douro region is the third oldest protected wine region in the world after Chianti, in 1716, and Tokaj, in 1730.

In 1756, during the rule of the Marquis of Pombal, the Companhia Geral da Agricultura das Vinhas do Alto Douro (C.G.A.V.A.D., also known as the General Company of Viticulture of the Upper Douro or Douro Wine Company), was founded to guarantee the quality of the product and fair pricing to the end consumer. The C.G.A.V.A.D. was also in charge of regulating which port wine would be for export or internal consumption and managing the protected geographic indication.

Other port-style fortified wines are produced outside Portugal – in Argentina, Australia, Canada, France, India, Italy, South Africa, Spain, and the United States – but under the European Union Protected Designation of Origin guidelines, only wines from Portugal are allowed to be labelled "port".

=== Wine regions ===
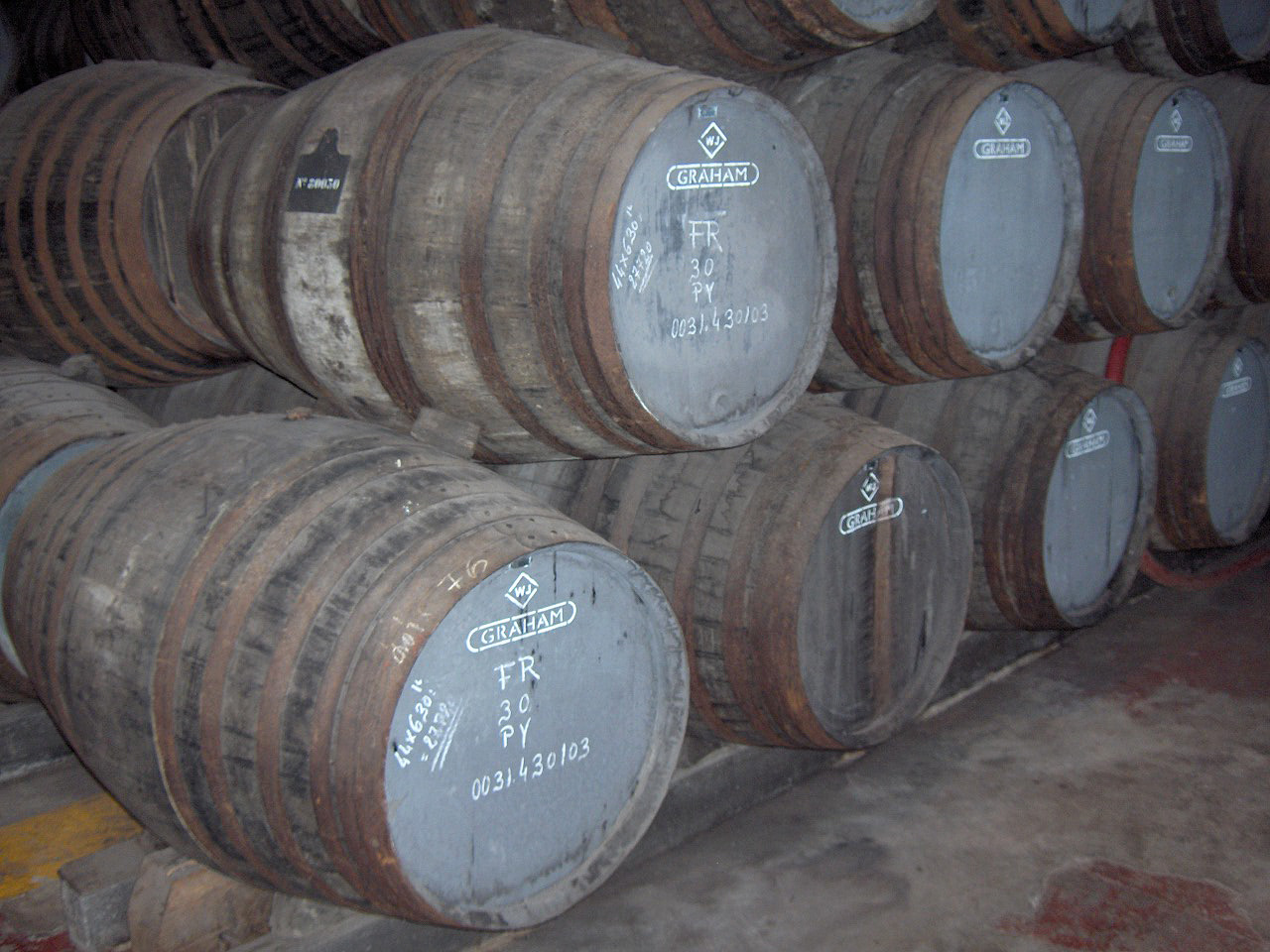
Aging in wooden barrels

The demarcation of the Douro River Valley includes a broad swath of land of pre-Cambrian schist and granite. Beginning around the village of Barqueiros (about 70 km (43 mi) upstream from Porto), the valley extends eastward almost to the Spanish border. The region is protected from the influences of the Atlantic Ocean by the Serra do Marão mountains. The area is subdivided into three official zones: the Baixo (lower) Corgo, the Cima (higher) Corgo, and the Douro Superior.

- Baixo Corgo – The westernmost zone located downstream from the river Corgo, centred on the municipality of Peso da Régua. This region is the wettest port production zone, receiving an annual average of 900 millimetres (35 in) of precipitation and it has the coolest average temperature of the three zones. The grapes grown here are used mainly for the production of inexpensive ruby and tawny ports.
- Cima Corgo – Located upstream from the Baixo Corgo, this region is centred on the town of Pinhão (municipality of Alijó). The summertime average temperature of the region is a few degrees higher, and annual rainfall is about 700 millimetres (28 in). The grapes grown in this zone are considered of higher quality, being used in bottlings of vintage, reserve, aged tawny, and late bottled vintage ports.
- Douro Superior – The easternmost zone, extending almost to the Spanish border. This is the least cultivated region of Douro, due in part to the difficulties of navigating the river past the rapids of Cachão da Valeira. This is the driest and warmest region of the Douro. The overall terrain is relatively flat, with the potential for mechanization.

=== Grapes ===
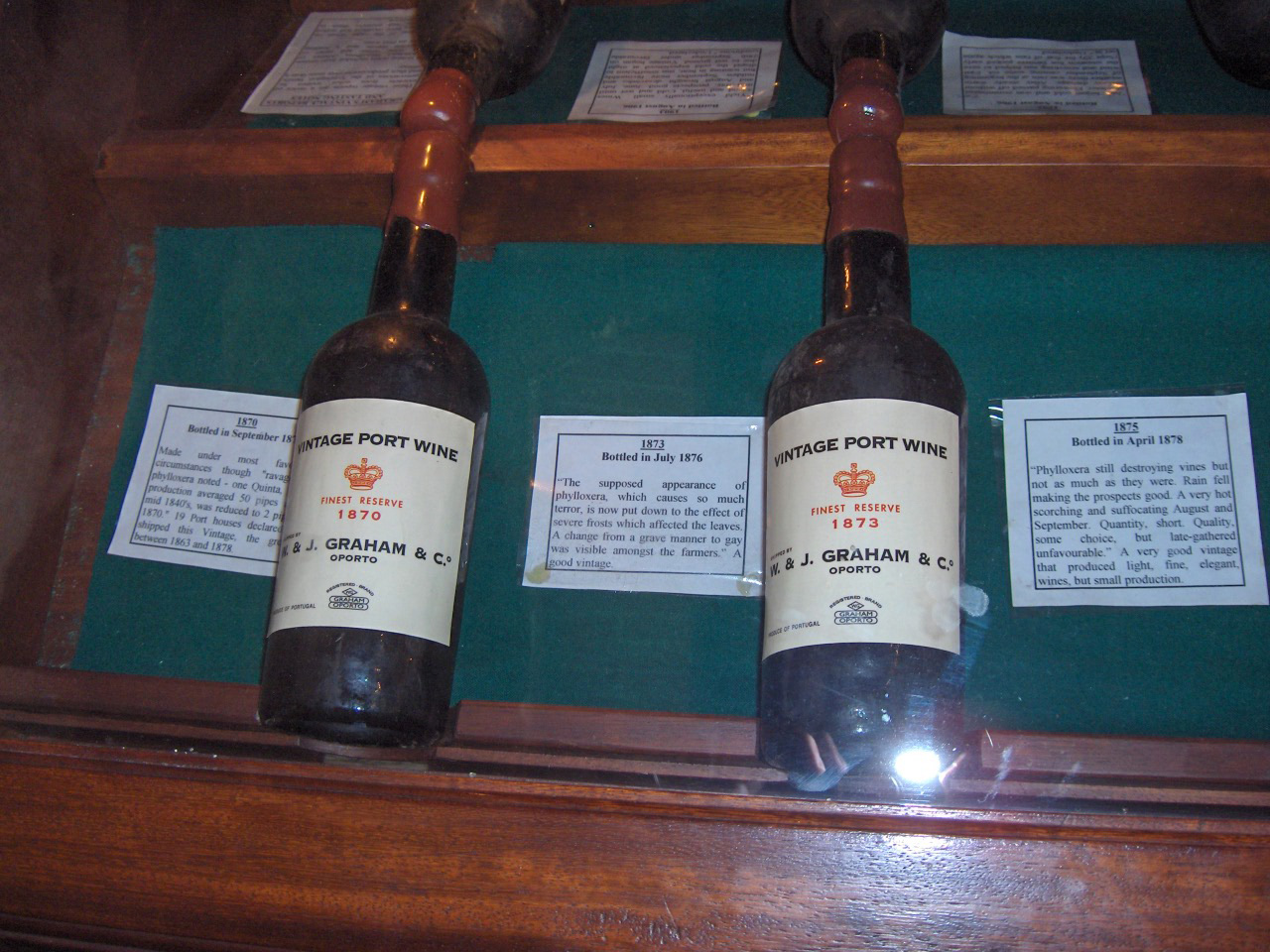
Vintage ports from 1870 and 1873

Over a hundred varieties of grapes (castas) are sanctioned for port production, although only five (Tinta Barroca, Tinto Cão, Tinta Roriz (Tempranillo), Touriga Francesa, and Touriga Nacional) are widely cultivated and used. Touriga Nacional is widely considered the most desirable port grape but the difficulty in growing it, and the small yields cause Touriga Francesa to be the most widely planted grape. White ports are produced the same way as red ports, except that they use white grapes – Donzelinho Branco, Esgana-Cão, Folgasão, Gouveio, Malvasia Fina, Rabigato and Viosinho. While a few shippers have experimented with ports produced from a single variety of grapes, all ports commercially available are from a blend of different grapes. Since the Phylloxera crisis, most vines are grown on grafted rootstock, with the notable exception of the Nacional area of Quinta do Noval, which, since being planted in 1925, has produced some of the most expensive vintage ports.

Grapes grown for port are generally characterized by their small, dense fruit which produces concentrated and long-lasting flavours, suitable for long aging. While the grapes used to produce port made in Portugal are strictly regulated by the Instituto do Vinho do Porto, wines from outside this region that describe themselves as port may be made from other varieties.

=== Sales ===
In 2013, there were 8.7 million cases of port sold, 3.6% less than the previous year, at a value of $499 million. Port sales have been declining since 2005 and in 2014 were down 16% from that year. In 2023 about 7.2 million cases were sold, with a value of €364 million. Declining sales are attributed by some to increasing prices, due to the increased cost of alcohol used in the production process. Declining sales have also been attributed to the global rise in alcohol levels of table wines. As of 2014, the leading brand in Portugal is Cálem, which sells 2.6 million bottles annually.

=== Transport ===
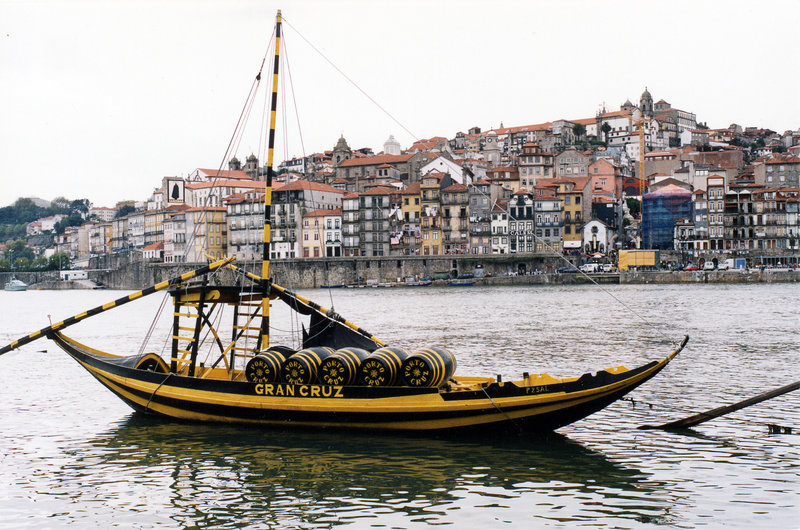
Rabelos, a type of boat traditionally used to transport barrels of port down the River Douro for storage and aging in caves at Vila Nova de Gaia near Porto

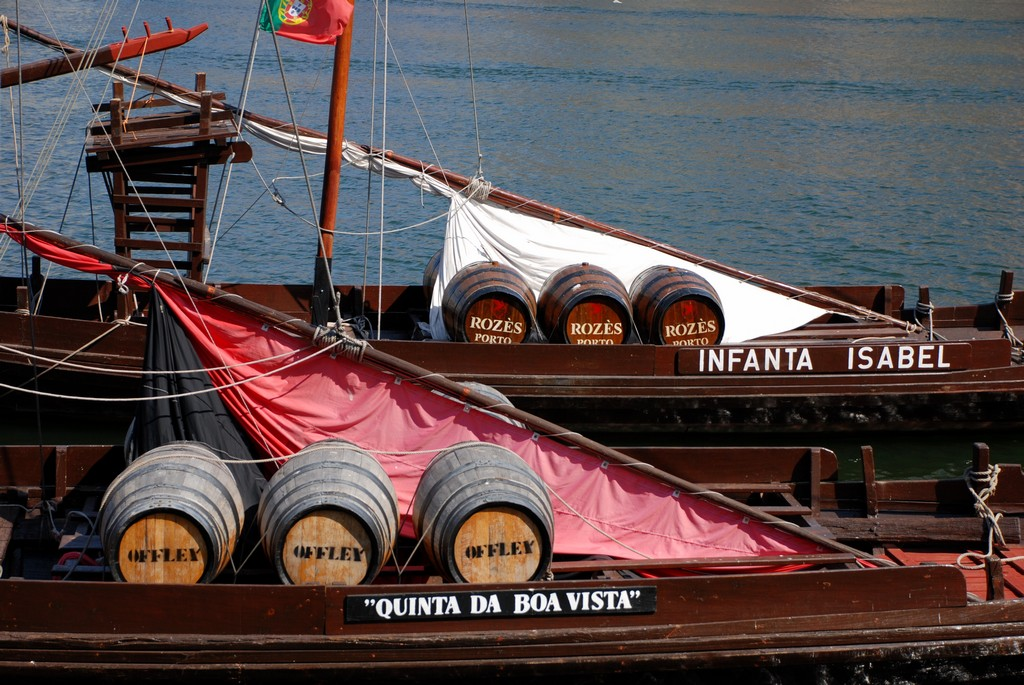
A barco rabelo carrying display port barrels

Port is produced from grapes grown in the Douro valley. Until 1986 it could only be exported from Portugal from Vila Nova de Gaia near Porto, Portugal's second-largest city. Traditionally, the wine was taken downriver in flat-bottom boats called 'barcos rabelos', to be processed and stored. In the 1950s and 1960s, several hydroelectric power dams were built along the river, ending this traditional conveyance. Currently, the wine is transported from the vineyards by tanker trucks and the barcos rabelos are only used for racing and other displays.

== Properties ==
Port wine is typically richer, sweeter, heavier, and higher in alcohol content than unfortified wines. This is caused by the addition of distilled grape spirits that fortify the wine, but also halt fermentation before all the sugar is converted to alcohol, and results in a wine that is usually 19% to 20% alcohol.

Port is commonly served after meals as a dessert wine in English-speaking countries, often with cheese, nuts, or chocolate; white and tawny ports are often served as an apéritif. In continental Europe, all types of ports are frequently consumed as apéritifs.

== Styles ==
Port from Portugal comes in several styles, which can be divided into two broad categories: wines matured in sealed glass bottles, and wines that have matured in wooden barrels.

The former, without exposure to air, experience what is known as "reductive" ageing. This process leads to the wine losing its color very slowly and produces a wine that is smoother on the palate and less tannic.

The latter, being matured in wooden barrels, whose permeability allows a small amount of exposure to oxygen, experience what is known as "oxidative" aging. They too lose color, but at a faster pace. They also lose volume to evaporation (angel's share), leaving behind a wine that is slightly more viscous.

The IVDP (Instituto dos Vinhos do Douro e Porto) further divides ports into two categories: normal ports (standard ruby, three-year-old tawny, and white) and Categorias Especiais, special categories, which include everything else.

The different types of Port Wine.

=== Ruby ===
The most common type, regular ruby port is stored in tanks of concrete or stainless steel after fermentation, to prevent oxidative aging and preserve its bright red color and full-bodied fruitiness. The wine is usually blended to match the style of the brand to which it is to be sold. The wine is fined and cold filtered before bottling and does not generally improve with age, although premium rubies such as LBVs are aged in wood from four to six years.

==== Reserve ====
Reserve ruby is a premium ruby port approved by the IVDP's tasting panel, the Câmara de Provadores. In 2002 the IVDP prohibited the use of the term "vintage character", as reserve ruby port had neither a single vintage (usually being a blend of several vintages of the ruby) nor the typical character of vintage port.

==== Late bottled vintage ====
Late bottled vintage (often referred to simply as LBV) was originally wine that had been destined for bottling as vintage port, but due to lack of demand was left in the barrel for longer than had been planned. Over time it has become two distinct styles of wine, both of them aged in barrel and bottled between four and six years after the vintage, but one style is fined and filtered before bottling, while the other is not. The Portuguese Port Houses tend more to produce LBVs unfiltered, while the British Port Houses tend to produce them filtered. If unspecified on the bottle, the LBV is likely fined and filtered to some degree.

The accidental origin of late bottled vintage has led to more than one company claiming its invention. The earliest known reference to a style of port with this name in a merchant's list is to be found in The Wine Society's catalogue from 1964, which includes Fonseca's Quinta Milieu 1958, bottled in the UK, also in 1964. By the 1962 vintage, LBV was being produced in Portugal and bottled as LBV.

LBV is intended to provide some of the experience of drinking a vintage port but without the need for lengthy bottle ageing. To a limited extent, it succeeds, as the extra years of oxidative ageing in the barrel does mature the wine more quickly.

===== Unfiltered =====
Unfiltered LBVs are mostly bottled with conventional driven corks and need to be decanted, and if even mildly aged in bottle they will produce a sediment. After decanting they should be consumed within a few days. Recent bottlings are identified by the label "unfiltered", "bottle matured", or both. Since the 2002 regulations, bottles that carry the words "bottle matured" must have enjoyed at least three years of bottle maturation before release. Before 2002 this style was often marketed as "traditional", a description that is no longer permitted. Unfiltered LBV will usually be improved by extra years in the bottle. Top LBVs can age nearly as long as vintage ports and is difficult to identify as LBVs when inserted into blind tastings of vintage ports.

===== Filtered =====
The filtered LBV has the advantage of being ready to drink without decanting and is usually bottled in a stoppered bottle that can be easily resealed. However, many wine experts feel that this convenience comes at a price and believe that the filtration process strips out some of the character of the wine.

Typically ready to drink when released, filtered LBV ports tend to be lighter-bodied than vintage ports. Filtered LBVs can also improve with age, but only to a limited degree.

==== Crusted ====
Crusted port is usually a blend of several vintages. Unlike vintage port, which has to be sourced from grapes from a single vintage, crusted port affords the port blender the opportunity to make best use of the varying characteristics of different vintages.

Crusted port is bottled unfiltered and sealed with a driven cork. Like vintage port, it needs to be decanted before drinking. Crusted ports are not produced regularly by most Port houses, and can be understood as infrequent limited releases that lie somewhere between LBVs and VPs in character, but without the single-vintage-year constraint.

==== Vintage port ====
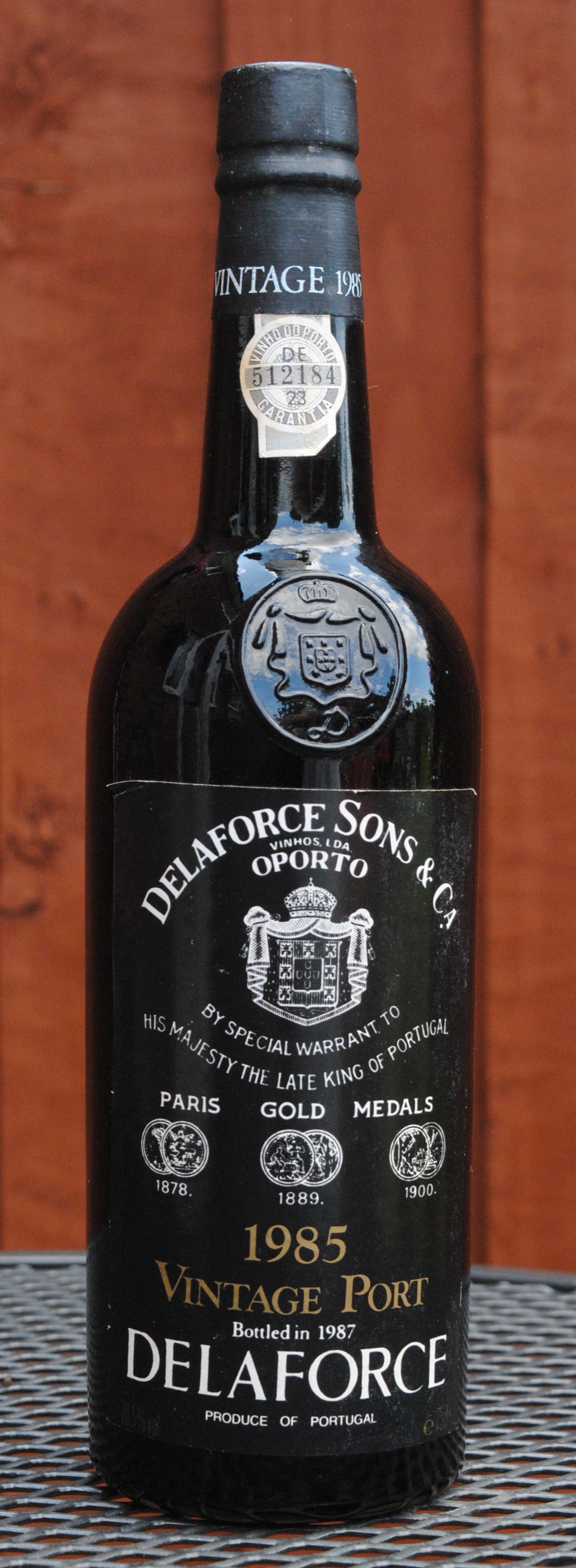
Delaforce 1985 vintage port

Vintage ports are high craftsmanship Ruby Ports, made from the finest selection of grapes. They may be aged in barrels or stainless steel for a maximum of two and a half years before bottling, and are designed to age another 10 to 40+ years in the bottle before reaching what may be considered a proper drinking age. Since they are potentially aged in a cask for only a short time, they retain their dark ruby color and fresh fruit flavours. Particularly fine vintage ports can continue to gain complexity for many decades after they were bottled. It is not uncommon for 19th-century bottles to still be in perfect condition for consumption. The oldest known vintage port still available as of 2018 from a shipper is the 1815 Ferreira. A tasting in 1990 described it as having an "intensely spicy aroma – cinnamon, pepper, and ginger – hints of exotic woods, iodine, and wax".

Vintage port is made entirely from the grapes of a declared vintage year. While it is the most renowned type of port, from a volume and revenue standpoint, vintage port accounts for only about two percent of overall port production. Not every year is declared a vintage in the Douro. The decision on whether to declare a vintage is made early in the second year following the harvest. The decision to declare a vintage is made by each individual port house often referred to as a "shipper".

Much of the complex character of aged vintage port comes from the continued slow decomposition of grape solids in each bottle. These solids are undesirable when the port is consumed, and thus vintage port typically requires a period of settling before decanting and pouring.

==== Single quinta vintage port ====
Single quinta vintage ports are wines that originate from a single estate, unlike standard vintage port bottlings of the port wine houses which can be sourced from a number of quintas. Most of the large port wine houses have a single quinta bottling which is only produced in years when the regular vintage port of the house is not declared. In those years, wine from their best quinta is still bottled under a vintage designation, rather than being used for simpler port qualities.

==== Rosé ====
Rosé port is a recent variant of Port, first released in 2008 by Poças and by Croft, part of the Taylor Fladgate Partnership. It is technically a ruby port, but fermented in a similar manner to a rosé wine, with limited exposure to the grape skins, thus creating the rose color.

=== Tawny ===
Tawny ports are wines usually made from red grapes that are aged in wooden barrels exposing them to gradual oxidation and evaporation. As a result of the oxidation, they mellow to a golden-brown color and develop "nutty" flavours, which is blended to match the house style. The slow evaporation gives tawny Ports a more concentrated and syrupy character, especially older ones that have experienced the most evaporation. They are sweet or medium dry and typically consumed as a dessert wine, but can also pair with a main course.

When a port is described as tawny, but without an indication of age, it is a basic blend of wood-aged port that has spent time in wooden barrels, typically three to seven years.

Reserve tawny port (produced by Borges, Calem, Croft, Cruz, Graham, Kopke, and other houses) has been aged about seven years.

Above this are tawny with an indication of age, which represent a blend of several vintages. The target age profile, in years in wood, is stated on the label, usually 10, 20, 30, 40, and even 50 years. These ports are produced by most houses.

In some places, such as Canada and Australia, 'tawny' may also be used to describe any port-style wine that is not produced in Portugal, in accordance with an agreement with the EU.

==== Colheita ====
Colheita port is a single-vintage tawny port aged for at least seven years, with the vintage year on the bottle instead of a category of age (10, 20, etc.). Colheita port should not be confused with a vintage port: a vintage port will spend only about 18 months in barrel after harvest and will continue to mature in bottle, but a Colheita may have spent 20 or more years in wooden barrels before being bottled and sold.

=== Garrafeira ===
Unusual and rare, vintage-dated Garrafeira combines the oxidative maturation of years in wood with further reductive maturation in large glass demijohns. It is required by the IVDP that wines spend some time in wood, usually between three and six years, followed by at least a further eight years in glass, before bottling. In practice, the times spent in glass are much longer. The style is associated with the company Niepoort, although others do exist. Their dark green demijohns, known as bon-bons, hold approximately 11 litres (2.4 imp gal; 2.9 US gal) each. Some connoisseurs describe Garrafeira as having a slight taste of bacon, the reason being that, during the second phase of maturation, certain oils may precipitate, causing a film to form across the surface of the glass.

Confusingly, the word Garrafeira may also be found on some very old tawny labels, where the contents of the bottle are of exceptional age.

=== White port ===
White port is made from white grapes, such as Malvasia Fina, Donzelinho, Gouveio, Codega and Rabigato, Young White ports are often labeled with varying levels of sweetness: dry, sweet, and lagrima, the last of which is extra sweet. Taylor introduced Chip Dry, a new style of white apéritif Port, in 1934. Made from traditional white grape varieties, brandy is added later during the fermentation process after a greater portion of the sugar has been converted to alcohol giving the Port its unusual dryness. White Colheitas have also been produced.

== Vintages ==
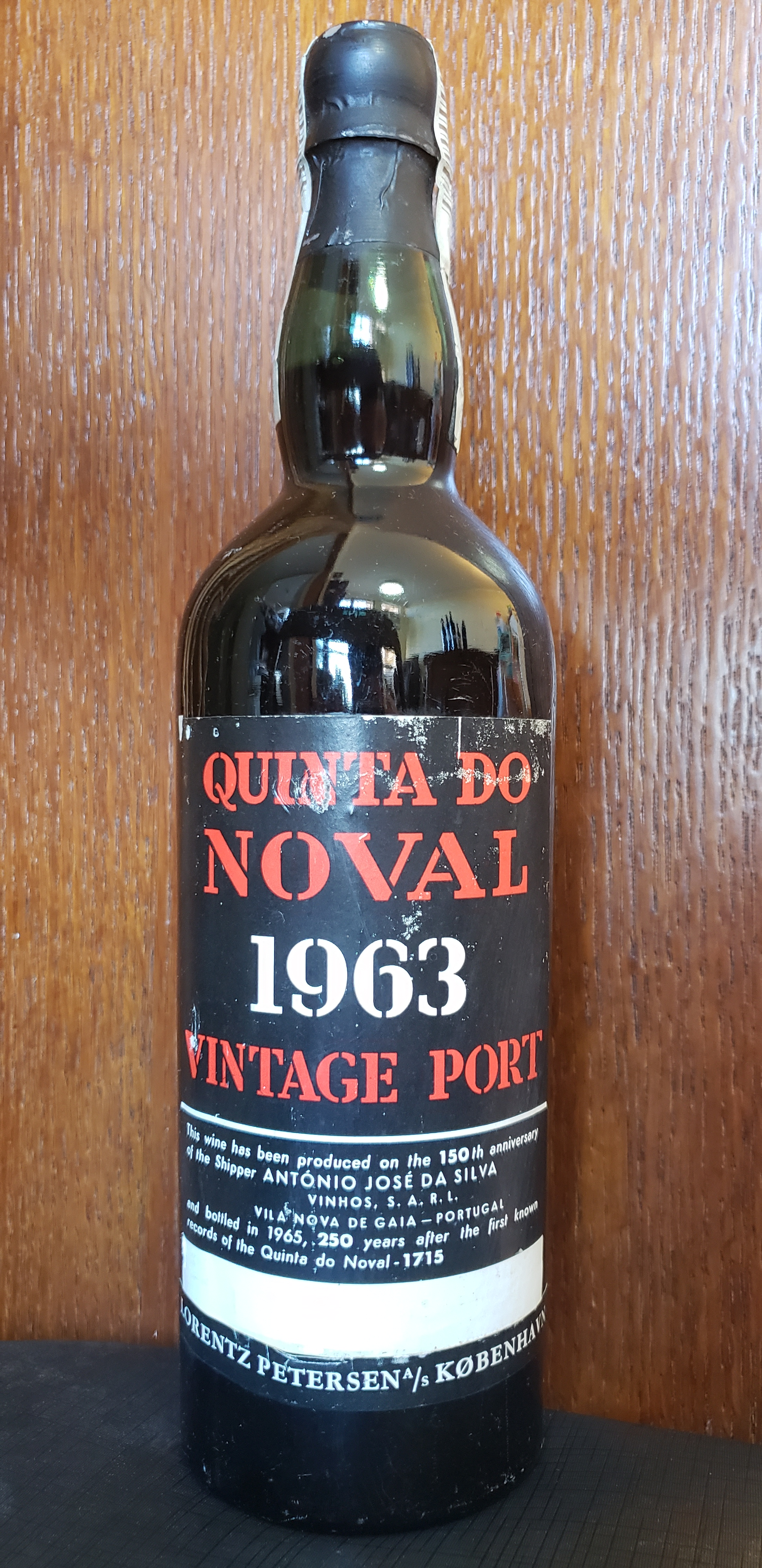
A bottle of Quinta do Noval vintage port 1963

The term vintage has a distinct meaning in the context of vintage port. While vintage is simply the year in which a wine is made, most producers of vintage port restrict their production of year-labelled bottlings to only the best years, a few per decade. Contrast with second wines, where (primarily) Bordeaux producers release a year-labelled top wine almost every year, but also lesser quality wines in some years.

If a port house decides that its wine is of a quality sufficient for a vintage, samples are sent to the IVDP for approval, and the house declares the vintage.

In intermediate years, the producers of blended vintage ports will not declare their flagship port but often declare the vintage of a single quinta, e.g., the 1996 Dow's Quinta do Bomfim and Taylor's Quinta de Vargellas. Some houses declare their wines in all but the worst years: Quinta do Vesuvio has declared a vintage every year with the exceptions of 1993, 2002, and 2014.

Improved wine-making technologies and better weather forecasts during the harvest have increased the number of years in which a vintage can be declared. Although there have been years when only one or two wines have been declared, it has been over thirty years since there was a year with no declarations at all.

2017 and 2016 were declared a vintage year by most producers, as was 2011. The quality of the grape harvest was attributed to ideal rainfall and temperature. Other recent widely declared vintage years were 2007, 2003, 2000, 1997 and 1994.

== Storing and serving ==
Port, like other wine, should be stored in a cool but not cold, dark location (as light can damage the port), at a steady temperature (such as a cellar), with the bottle laid on its side if it has a cork, or standing up if it is stoppered. With the exception of white port, which can be served chilled, the port should be served at between 15 and 20 °C (59–68 °F). Tawny port may also be served slightly cooler.

Port wines that are unfiltered (such as vintage ports, crusted ports, and some LBVs) form a sediment (or crust) in the bottle and require decanting. This process also allows the port to breathe (allowing the wine to mix with oxygen).

A traditional method of opening a vintage port is with port tongs. The tongs are heated over a flame and applied to the bottle's neck. The bottleneck is cooled with cold water, causing a clean break. This avoids the use of a corkscrew on an older cork, which would otherwise break apart and crumble into the wine.

Once opened, a port generally lasts longer than unfortified wine, but it is still best consumed within a short period of time. Tawny ports may keep for several months once opened; because they are aged longer in barrels, these ports have already been exposed to significant oxidation. Old vintage ports are best consumed within several days of opening, but young Ruby ports such as vintage ports and LBV Ports can be kept open for several weeks, if not months when very young.

Tradition in the United Kingdom calls for the port being served at a formal dinner to be passed to the left ("pass the port to port") and for the bottle or decanter not to touch the table on its way around, though some cultures reject this tradition. If a diner fails to pass the port, others at the table may ask "Do you know the Bishop of Norwich?" – the question acts as a reminder to pass the port, for those who know the story, and an opportunity to tell the story to those who have not heard it.

== Instituto dos Vinhos do Douro e do Porto ==
The Port and Douro Wines Institute is an official body belonging to the Ministry of Agriculture of Portugal and is a key institution in promoting the industry and knowledge of making port wine. It was previously known as the Instituto do Vinho do Porto.

== Port houses ==
Producers of port wine are often called "shippers". In the early history of the port wine trade, many of the most powerful shipping families were British (English and Scottish) and Irish; this history can still be seen in the names of many of the most famous port wines, such as Dow’s, Graham's, Sandeman, Churchill's, Cockburn's and Taylor’s. Over the years Portuguese, as well as Dutch and German-owned shippers have also become prevalent in the port industry.

Porto, a World Heritage Site, is home to many famous port houses located near the Douro River, making the shipping of port wine easy. Some of these port houses are private, while others are open to public tours and visits.

== As a historical remedy for illness ==
Port has been used in the past as a healing agent in earlier remedies. The British Prime Minister William Pitt the Younger was given port for gout as a boy. He began at the age of 14 (1773) with a bottle a day according to J. Ehrman (1969), The Younger Pitt. Heavy alcohol consumption is known to exacerbate gout.

A recurring motif in the novels of Anthony Trollope is the partiality of respectable elderly ladies for port, which they excuse on the grounds that it is "medicinal".

== Chemistry ==
Aged port wine contains a family of bluish phenolic pigments called portosins (vinylpyranoanthocyanins) and oxovitisin A, an oxovitisin, a type of pyranoanthocyanin with a 2-pyrone component.

== See also ==
- List of Portuguese wine regions
- Madeira wine
- Port wine cheese, a cheese made with wine.
- Portello, a non-alcoholic soft drink based on the flavour of the wine.
- Sherry
