= White people in Kenya =

Racial and multi-ethnic group

White Kenyans
Total population
- 42,868 (2019)

Regions with significant populations
- Nairobi Province, Rift Valley, Coast Province, Central Province

Languages
- English, Italian, Settler Swahili, Greek

Religion
- Predominantly Christianity and Judaism

White people in Kenya or White Kenyans are those born in or resident in Kenya who descend from Europeans and identify themselves as White. There is currently a minor but relatively prominent White community in Kenya. The community has mainly descended from Britain; there are also smaller populations of Italian and Greek migrants dating from the colonial period.

== History ==
The Age of Discovery first led to European interaction with the region of present-day Kenya. The coastal regions were seen as a valuable foothold in eastern trade routes, and Mombasa became a key port for ivory. The Portuguese established a presence in the region for two hundred years between 1498 and 1698, before losing control of the coast to the Sultanate of Oman when Fort Jesus was captured.

European exploration of the interior commenced in 1844 when two German missionaries, Johann Ludwig Krapf and Johannes Rebmann, ventured inland with the aim of spreading Christianity. The region soon sparked the imagination of other adventurers and gradually their stories began to awaken their governments to the potential of the area.

The rise of New Imperialism in the late nineteenth century, intensified European interest in the region. The initial driving force lay with pioneering businessmen, such as Carl Peters and William Mackinnon seeking to establish lucrative trade routes in the region. These businessmen would compel their respective governments to protect their trading interests, and in 1885 eastern Africa was carved-up between Britain, Germany and France. The British assumed control of the regions of Kenya and Uganda, and governed it through the Imperial British East Africa Company. In 1895, the British government proclaimed the territories of the Imperial British East Africa Company as a protectorate, and transferred responsibility of its administration to the Foreign Office. This coincided with a plan to open up the interior to trade with the construction of a railway from the coast in Mombasa to the shores of Lake Victoria.

=== East Africa Protectorate ===
Although the first Land Regulations Act was passed in 1897, few Europeans settled in the country before completion of the Uganda railway. In 1902, Sir Charles Eliot, then-British Commissioner of the Protectorate, initiated a policy of settling European colonists in what would become the White Highlands region. Eliot's vision for the Protectorate was to turn the Highlands into a settlers' frontier, perceiving the region to be admirably suited for a White-man's country. The Crown Lands Ordinance was thus passed, allowing for Crown land to be granted either freehold or leasehold for 99 years. Eliot believed the only way to improve the local economy and ensure the profitability of the Uganda railway, was to encourage European settlement and endeavour in hitherto large areas of uncultivated fertile lands.

By the end of 1903, the population of settlers had increased to 100. A further batch of 280 Boers later arrived from South Africa. Amongst the first settlers were affluent British gentry such as Lord Delamere, Lord Hindlip and Lord Cranworth who had the necessary capital to develop large areas of land and live a pseudo-aristocratic life. The land laws were so favourable to settlers that they were described as the most liberal in the world.

By 1914, there were approximately 1,300 European settlers in the country, and prior to 1912, South Africans formed the majority of Kenya's White settlers. During the First World War, many more South Africans arrived in East Africa as part of the campaign against German East Africa and stayed to work in Kenya's service economy. By 1915, the government was offering 999 year leases to encourage settlement as well as exemptions from land tax. The state also subsidised White farmers' produce to give them a competitive advantage over Black smallholders in the open markets.

Due to the high start-up costs involved in producing coffee and cattle, Kenya earned a reputation as a "big man's frontier". Such men were eager to make Kenya another "White man's country" along the lines of South Africa or Australia, and recognised the need for the "small man" with limited capital on small acreage to increase the White population and provide a more solid foundation for their vision.

In 1919, the UK Government launched the Ex-Soldier Settlement Scheme. It became the largest single allocation of land for European settlement in Kenyan history, involving over 800,000 hectares (2,000,000 acres) of land, and increasing the area of White settlement by a third. Applicants were required to be British subjects of pure European origin, who had served in any officially recognised imperial service unit in the war. The majority hailed from Britain, with sizeable amounts from Ireland, India and South Africa. There were also a small number of Canadian cattle ranchers, Australian graziers and New Zealand farmers. A large proportion of the soldier settlers hailed from the upper classes, with a third having attended British public schools. On the whole, the aristocratic soldier settlers were sons, brothers, brothers-in-law, or married to the nieces of the rich and powerful in Britain. Notable participants in the scheme included: Viscount Bury, Viscount Broome, Sir Delvis Broughton, Sir G.F Milne, and Sir Hubert Gough, Maurice Egerton and Phaedrig O'Brien. As a result of the scheme, the European population had risen to 9,651 by 1921.

=== Kenya Colony ===
Flag of British East Africa

In 1920, the protectorate became a Crown colony. Land confiscations, forced labour, and African participation in higher education, bureaucratic institutions, and the First World War helped spark a substantive African nationalist movement in Kenya during the 1920s. Leaders such as Jomo Kenyatta and Harry Thuku highlighted a view of an unjust political and social situation for the non-settler population of Kenya.

A last attempt to recruit settlers to Kenya occurred in 1945. Only about 500 Europeans migrated to Kenya, meaning the European population remained low, amounting to just 23,033 as against an African population of 5,200,000.

Following the Second World War, dissatisfaction against colonialism led to an anti-colonial rebellion led by the Kikuyu known as the Mau Mau Uprising. The rebellion was motivated in part by confiscation of Kenyan lands and discrimination from White settlers. During the rebellion, 32 White settlers were killed, mostly by the revolutionary Mau Mau organisation.

=== Republic of Kenya ===
By the early 1960s, the political willingness of the British government to maintain Kenya as a colony was in decline and in 1962 the Lancaster House agreement set a date for Kenyan independence. Realizing that a unilateral declaration of independence course like Rhodesia's was not possible after the Mau Mau Uprising, the majority of the 60,000 White settlers considered migrating elsewhere. Along with Kenya's Indian population, Europeans and their descendants were given the choice of retaining their British passports and suffering a diminution in rights, or acquiring new Kenyan passports. Relatively few chose to acquire citizenship, and many White Kenyans departed the country.

A number of schemes were developed for land reform, the colonial government established the Million Acre Settlement Scheme (administered by the Land Development and Settlement Board), under which European-owned farms were purchased on a willing-seller basis, subdivided and sold on credit to African settlers. Britain provided most of the scheme's finance through grants and loans, totalling in the region of £25m. The programme ultimately transferred about one million acres to some 34,000 African families. It formed part of a broader programme of land transfer schemes, including a scheme by International Bank and the Colonial Development Corporation.

In the 1979 general election, Philip Leakey became the first White member of the Kenyan Parliament since independence.

According to the Kenya National Bureau of Statistics (KNBS), In 2019 there were 69,621 Europeans in Kenya, of which 42,868 were Kenyan citizens. The proportion that are Kenyan citizens has likely increased due to the implementation of dual nationality in 2010. There are also British citizens living in Kenya who may be of any race; according to the BBC, they numbered at about 32,000 in 2006.

== Socioeconomics ==
=== Early twentieth century ===
Dating from 1902, the East Africa Protectorate government granted considerable concessions to European settlers in order to enable them to entrench themselves politically and economically. Aside from the land laws, they benefited from the coercion of African labour, forms of taxation such as the hut tax, the resettlement of Africans in native reserves, and the granting of monopoly rights to settlers for the production of certain export crops. In 1907, despite Kenya still being a Protectorate, the Colonial Office authorised the establishment of a Legislative Council on a franchise limited to Europeans. Despite these policies, in 1914, the settler agricultural production accounted for only 25 per cent of total exports.

The aftermath of the First World War saw a spectacular increase in European agricultural production, largely due to protective tariffs on imports and prohibiting African cultivation of certain crops such as coffee and pyrethrum. In the 1920s settler agricultural production accounted for approximately 80 per cent of all export earnings. On the whole however, settler economic performance was unreliable and unlike in Rhodesia or South Africa where Africans were forced by land scarcity to seek economic relief in wage labour on European farms, thus boosting productivity on such farms, Africans in Kenya were able to cultivate or graze livestock on their own land, producing for the domestic market.

Life for Europeans in Kenya during the 1920s would later be immortalised in Karen Blixen's memoir Out of Africa. The presence of herds of elephants and zebra, and other wild animals on these estates drew wealthy aristocracy from Europe and America, who came attracted by big game hunting.

=== Present day ===
Economically, virtually all Europeans in Kenya belong to the middle- and upper-middle-class. They formerly clustered in the country's highland region, the so-called 'White Highlands'. The White Highlands were depopulated of White settlers before independence with much of the land being sold to Africans under the Million Acre Settlement Scheme. Nowadays only a small minority landowners (livestock and game ranchers, horticulturists and farmers), whereas the majority work in the tertiary sector: in finance, import, air transport, conservation and hospitality.

== Societal integration ==
Apart from isolated individuals such as the late anthropologist and conservationist Richard Leakey, F.R.S., Kenyan White people have virtually completely retreated from Kenyan politics, and are no longer represented in public service and parastatals, from which the last remaining staff from colonial times retired in the 1970s.

The book and movie White Mischief included an earlier member of the Cholmondeley family, The 4th Baron Delamere (popularly known as Tom Delamere). He was married to Diana Broughton, a member of the Happy Valley set, whose lover was murdered in Nairobi in 1941. Her first husband, Jock Delves Broughton, was tried and acquitted. The 2005 homicide case of game ranger Samson ole Sisina by the White Kenyan dairy and livestock farmer and game rancher, the Hon. Thomas Cholmondeley, a descendant of British aristocrats, raised perceptions of class bias in the judicial system and the resentment of many Kenyans toward what they perceive as white privilege.

== Controversy associated with "the Happy Valley set" ==
The "Happy Valley set" was largely a group of hedonistic British and Anglo-Irish aristocrats and adventurers who settled in the Happy Valley region of the Wanjohi Valley near the Aberdare mountain range, in the colonies of Kenya and Uganda between the 1920s and the 1940s. From the 1930s the group became infamous for its decadent lifestyles and exploits following reports of drug use and sexual promiscuity.

The area around Naivasha was one of the first to be settled in Kenya by White people and was one of the main hunting grounds of the 'set'. The colonial town of Nyeri, Kenya, to the east of the Aberdare Range, was the centre of Happy Valley settlers.

The White community in Kenya in the years before the Second World War was divided into two distinct factions: settlers, on the one side, and colonial officials and tradesmen, on the other. Both were dominated by upper-middle-class and upper-class British and Irish (chiefly Anglo-Irish) people, but the two groups often disagreed on important matters ranging from land allocation to how to deal with the indigenous population. Typically, the officials and tradesmen looked on the Happy Valley set with embarrassment.

The height of the Happy Valley set's influence was in the late 1920s. The recession sparked by the 1929 Wall Street stock market crash greatly decreased the number of new arrivals to the Colony of Kenya and the influx of capital. Nevertheless, by 1939 Kenya had a White community of 21,000 people.

Some of the members of the Happy Valley set were: The 3rd Baron Delamere and his son and heir The 4th Baron Delamere; The Hon. Denys Finch Hatton; The Hon. Berkeley Cole (an Anglo-Irish nobleman from Ulster); Sir Jock Delves Broughton, 11th Bt.; The 22nd Earl of Erroll; Lady Idina Sackville; Alice de Janzé (cousin of J. Ogden Armour); Frédéric de Janzé; Lady Diana Delves Broughton; Gilbert Colville; Hugh Dickenson; Jack Soames; Nina Soames; Lady June Carberry (stepmother of Juanita Carberry); Dickie Pembroke; and Julian Lezzard. Author Baroness Karen Blixen (Isak Dinesen) had also been a friend of Lord Erroll.

Since 2015, descendants of the Happy Valley set have been appearing in the news, particularly deaths at the hands of The Hon. Tom Cholmondeley, the great-grandson of the famous Lord Delamere.

== See also ==
- Kenya Colony – British colony (1920–1963)
- List of Kenyan European people
- Demographics of Kenya
- History of the Jews in Kenya
