= Happy Valley set =

Group of British aristocrats settling in colonial Kenya

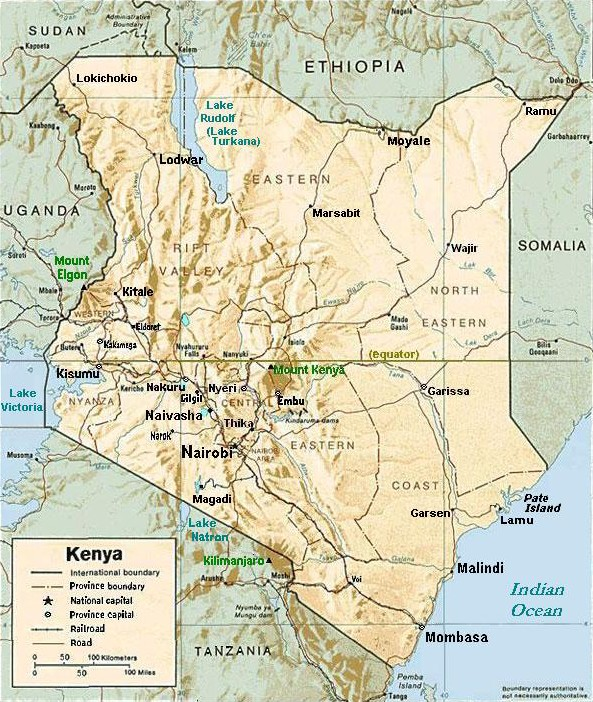
Nyeri in Central Province, Kenya, was the centre of the Happy Valley set

The Happy Valley set was a group of mostly British and Anglo-Irish aristocrats and adventurers who settled in the "Happy Valley" region of the Wanjohi Valley, near the Aberdare mountain range, in colonial Kenya between the 1920s and the 1940s. During the 1930s, the group became infamous for its hedonistic, decadent lifestyles and exploits amid reports of drug use and sexual promiscuity.

The area around the town Naivasha, on the shore of Lake Naivasha, 92.8 km (57.7 mi) north west of Nairobi, was one of the first to be settled in Kenya by Europeans and was one of the main hunting grounds of the 'set'. The colonial town of Nyeri, to the east of the Aberdare Range, was the main town of Happy Valley settlers.

Some of the notable members of the Happy Valley set were Hugh Cholmondeley, 3rd Baron Delamere and his son and heir Thomas Cholmondeley, 4th Baron Delamere; Karen Blixen, her husband Bror von Blixen-Finecke and lover Denys Finch Hatton; Sir Jock Delves Broughton and wife Diana Delves Broughton; Josslyn Hay, 22nd Earl of Erroll; Lady Idina Sackville; Alice de Janzé (cousin of J. Ogden Armour) and her husband Count Frederic de Janzé.

During the mid-2000s, descendants of the Happy Valley set faced publicity due to the legal troubles of Thomas Cholmondeley, grandson of the 4th Baron Delamere and heir to the title.

== History ==
According to Ulf Aschan, "Witty, attractive, well-bred, and well read, Happy Valleyites were relentless in their pursuit to be amused, more often attaining this through drink, drugs, and sex." The Happy Valley set's main period of fame was during the late 1920s. The recession caused by the 1929 stock market crisis greatly decreased the number of new arrivals to the Colony of Kenya and the influx of capital. Nevertheless, by 1939 Kenya had a European community of 21,000 people.

== Location ==
The area around the town Naivasha was one of the first to be settled by Europeans and one of the hunting grounds of the hedonistic Happy Valley set. The area also includes Thomson's Falls. Geoffrey Buxton, the first colonial farmer in the area, had relocated up from the arid Rift Valley with its meagre rivers and a relentless dusty wind that gave Gilgil its name. And so, after finding his ideal farming country, he named this new haven 'Happy Valley'. Some members of the Happy Valley set lived in Gilgil, Kenya, just north of Lake Elementaita.

The town Nyeri in Central Province, to the east of the Aberdare Range, was another town in the vicinity of Happy Valley. The town had cool air and morning mists. Outside Nyeri is the Outspan Hotel, which was the final home of Lord Baden-Powell and his wife, founders of Boy and Girl Scouting, and he is buried outside Nyeri. The cottage has a small museum dedicated to Baden-Powell's life and memory.

== In popular culture ==
The antics of the Happy Valley set were publicised by books and movies such as White Mischief, which dramatised the trial of Jock Delves Broughton for the murder of Josslyn Hay, 22nd Earl of Erroll; and The Happy Valley, Juanita Carberry's account of her adolescence and later involvement with the Delves Broughton case. A biography of Idina Sackville, The Bolter, by Frances Osborne, includes stories of the origins of the Happy Valley set and features many of its major characters. Sackville was married to Lord Erroll for several years, and they had a child together.

The 1999 UK television mini-series Heat of the Sun describes lives and crimes of some fictional Happy Valley dwellers.

In 2019, British-American author Rhys Bowen published a murder mystery titled Love and Death Among the Cheetahs set in the valley, which is the 13th installment of her series A Royal Spyness Mystery.

In 2019, Irish author Lucinda Riley fictionalised the lives of some well known members of the Happy Valley set in her novel The Sun Sister.

== Notables ==
Some notable members of the Happy Valley set in Kenya, 1926. From left to right: Raymond de Trafford, Frédéric de Janzé, Alice de Janzé and Lord Delamere.

Although there is no actual definition of what constitutes a member of the Happy Valley set, it is generally agreed by writers that it refers to European colonials located in or around the area of the Wanjohi Valley, who were infamous during the 1920s–1940s period for a number of scandals, usually concerning infidelity and abuse of drugs or alcohol.

Some of the most notable members of that clique are the following:

=== Hugh Cholmondeley, 3rd Baron Delamere ===
One of the first British settlers in East Africa, Hugh Cholmondeley, 3rd Baron Delamere (1870–1931), K.C.M.G., is credited with helping form the Happy Valley set. Lord Delamere first travelled to East Africa in 1891 for lion hunting and returned yearly to resume the hunt. In 1894, he was mauled by a lion. As a result, he limped for the rest of his life. He is also credited for inventing the term "white hunter". In 1896, he relocated to Africa and eventually settled in Kenya. In 1906, he acquired a large farm, the Soysambu Ranch, which would eventually rise to 200,000 acres (810 km^{2}). Lord Delamere is also considered to have contributed significantly to the development of Kenyan agriculture. He quickly became well known among the European community in Kenya. He was active in recruiting settlers to East Africa, and deeply admired the culture of the local Maasai. There is a story of Delamere's riding his horse into the dining room of Nairobi's Norfolk Hotel and jumping over the tables. He was also known to knock golf balls onto the roof of the Muthaiga Country Club, the pink stucco gathering-place for Nairobi's white élite, and then climb up to retrieve them. At the outbreak of World War I, Delamere was placed in charge of intelligence on the Maasai border, monitoring the movements of German units in present-day Tanzania. He married Lady Charles Markham (née Gwladys Helen Beckett) in 1928. He died in 1931.

=== Josslyn Hay, 22nd Earl of Erroll ===
A Scottish peer and notorious philanderer, Josslyn Victor Hay, 22nd Earl of Erroll (1901–1941) abandoned his diplomatic career in Britain and scandalised society when he eloped with a married woman, Lady Idina Sackville. The couple were married in 1923 and relocated to Kenya in 1924. They became the most celebrated of the 'Happy Valley' set and their home, Slains (named after the former Hay family home of Slains Castle), became a venue of social life, notorious for its orgies. Idina, Countess of Erroll, divorced him in 1929, because he was cheating her financially. Lord Erroll was already having an affair with married woman Molly Ramsay-Hill. The couple eloped. When Ramsay-Hill's husband found out, he traced them and horsewhipped Lord Erroll in public at Nairobi Railway Station. Erroll married Molly in 1930. In 1934, Lord Erroll joined Sir Oswald Mosley's British Union of Fascists (B.U.F.) and, on his return to Kenya a year later, became president of the Convention of Associations. Early in 1939, Erroll's wife Molly, Countess of Erroll, died from the effects of consuming a concoction of alcohol, morphine and heroin. On the beginning of World War II later that year, Lord Erroll became a captain in the Kenya Regiment and accepted the post of military secretary for East Africa in 1940.

During late 1940, Lord Erroll met Diana, Lady Delves Broughton, the new, glamorous and much younger wife of Sir Jock Delves Broughton, 11th Baronet. Lord Erroll and Lady Delves Broughton soon became lovers. Their romance was a very public one. Delves Broughton admitted to have discussed it openly with Lord Erroll. However, in January 1941, Lord Erroll was found shot dead in his car in an intersection outside Nairobi. Although Delves Broughton was charged and tried, he was acquitted of the murder. Numerous books, movies (including White Mischief) and articles have been written on the murder mystery and various theories have been argued; the murder may have been solved by material discovered in 2007 suggesting that Delves Broughton was guilty after all.

=== Lady Idina Sackville ===
A British aristocrat, daughter of the 8th Earl de la Warr and cousin of poet Vita Sackville-West, Myra Idina Sackville (1893–1955) scandalised society when she divorced her first husband Euan Wallace, losing the right to see her two sons, who were later killed while serving in World War II. Idina abandoned her second husband Captain Charles Gordon for her lover Joss Hay, the future Earl of Erroll, eight years her junior. Together, they relocated to Kenya in 1924 and essentially pioneered the decadent lifestyle of the Happy Valley set. Idina became notorious for hosting wild parties, which included spouse-swapping and drug use. Stories were also told of how she often welcomed her guests in a bathtub made of green onyx and then proceeded to dress before them. After she and Erroll divorced, she married twice more. She died in 1955.

=== Countess Alice de Janzé ===
Born Alice Silverthorne (1899–1941), she was a wealthy heiress from Chicago and Buffalo, New York, daughter of an alcoholic felt manufacturer and niece to magnate J. Ogden Armour. She lived in Paris since the early 1920s, together with her husband, Count Frédéric de Janzé. The couple first met Joss Hay, Earl of Erroll and his wife, Idina, when the latter two lived in Paris during the early 1920s. After the Hays relocated to the Wanjohi Valley in Kenya, they invited the de Janzés for lion hunting, in 1925 and 1926. The de Janzés lived in a house next to the Hays for several months. Alice had an affair with Lord Erroll and later with Raymond de Trafford. When the de Janzés returned to Paris, Alice abandoned her husband for Raymond.

Alice made international headlines in 1927, when she shot Raymond in a Paris railway station and then shot herself. It was later revealed she did this on account of her anguish, after Raymond told her he could not marry her. They were both hospitalised but survived; Alice was tried by a Paris court and got away with a four-dollar fine. When she returned to Kenya in 1928, she was forced by the government to leave the country as an undesirable alien. In 1932, she and Raymond married in France, but separated almost immediately and later divorced. Alice later returned to the Happy Valley in Kenya. Depressive, alcoholic and addicted to morphine, she remained in Kenya until she committed suicide by shooting herself in 1941. Prior to her death, Alice had been considered as a suspect for the murder of Lord Erroll.

=== Count Frédéric de Janzé ===
A French nobleman from an old aristocratic family of Brittany, Comte (Count) Frédéric de Janzé was also famous in France for his career as a racing driver. After an invitation from their friends, Joss and Idina Hay, he and his wife, Alice, first travelled to the Wanjohi Valley, Kenya, in 1925 and spent months there, hunting lions. Frédéric had an affair with Idina, while Alice was having an affair with Joss. Frédéric wrote a memoir, Vertical Land, in which he gives his impressions of several of the notable personalities of the Happy Valley set. He returned with Alice to Happy Valley in 1926, during which time Alice tried to elope with her new lover, Raymond de Trafford. The de Janzés divorced in 1927, in the aftermath of Alice's shooting scandal. Frédéric died in 1933, of sepsis, aged 37.

=== Kiki Preston ===
Born Alice Gwynne (1898–1946), she was an American socialite, relative of the powerful Whitney and Vanderbilt families. Kiki and her second husband, Jeromy "Gerry" Preston (1897–1934) first moved to Kenya in 1926, after being offered land on the shores of Lake Naivasha by a friend. Kiki and her husband excelled as big game hunters. Kiki was also notorious for her drug use, especially her addiction to cocaine and heroin, and was one of the best clients of Frank Greswolde Williams, the chief drug dealer of the colony. She was nicknamed "the girl with the silver syringe", due to her habit of always carrying her syringe in her bag and publicly shooting drugs without regard for onlookers. Whenever she was out of supplies, she would send an aeroplane to get new ones. Kiki also had numerous affairs with men, including Prince George, Duke of Kent, whom she introduced to drugs, much to the dismay of the British royal family, which forbade them from meeting with each other. Kiki is often alleged to have borne a child out of wedlock from her affair with Prince George, who later became publishing executive Michael Temple Canfield, adopted son of Cass Canfield.

Following her husband's death, Kiki gradually abandoned the farm and returned to United States. Her son, Ethan, was killed in the Normandy Landings. Kiki committed suicide in 1946, jumping out of the window of her apartment at the Stanhope Hotel in New York City.

=== Raymond de Trafford ===
Son of Sir Humphrey de Trafford, 3rd Baronet, Raymond Vincent de Trafford (1900–1971) was a British aristocrat. His career first started in the Grenadier Guards or the Coldstream Guards (1919–1924). In late 1924 or early 1925 in London for a £50 wager he had a five-round boxing contest with a fellow club member, the 22-year-old Sir John Charles Peniston Milbanke.

A gambler, womaniser and alcoholic, de Trafford was a notable presence in the Happy Valley set during the 1920s, and had numerous lovers, including Alice de Janzé and Kiki Preston. He was reported as having large estates in Kenya, of at least 20,000 acres (8,100 ha). He once attempted to seduce Princess Alice, Duchess of Gloucester, but was repelled. De Trafford was once reported to be so drunk, he set some houses of Kenyans afire one night.

De Trafford was threatened by his family with disinheritance if he were to marry Comtesse Alice de Janzé. On Saturday 26 March 1927, after discovering the truth where he had promised to marry her, de Janzé shot him and then shot herself, after he had boarded the Calais express at the Gare du Nord railway station in Paris. They both survived, she was charged by the police, and he later as a witness, tried to defend de Janzé in her trial. On Monday 22 February 1932 in Neuilly-sur-Seine, he married de Janzé, but almost immediately deserted her (allegedly, because he feared her) on the SS Orsova in November 1932, and relocated to Australia. He visited all Australian states, and moved within the sporting social circles including horse racing in Sydney and Kalgoorlie. De Trafford returned to England in April 1936, although it was hinted he would return to Australia in January 1937. De Janzé was granted a decree nisi for divorce in October 1937.

On Friday, 3 March 1939, at Cheltenham, England on a country road, de Trafford hit and killed a cyclist with his car while drunk. He was driving to a hunt with his sister. Pleading not guilty, he was sentenced on 6 June 1939 for three years in Maidstone Gaol for manslaughter. Aged 41 and recently released from prison, in November 1941 de Trafford indicated he had allegedly enlisted as a private with the King's Royal Rifle Corps. His former wife de Janzé had committed suicide just a month prior. In August 1946 he was before the London Bankruptcy Court, for liabilities of £1960.

De Trafford married Eve de Vere Drummond (daughter of Northamptonshire cricketer George Drummond) in May 1951. He died on 14 May 1971 in Northampton.

=== Sir John "Jock" Delves Broughton ===
A British aristocrat, Sir Henry John "Jock" Delves Broughton (1883–1942) moved to Kenya, together with his new wife, Diana Caldwell, thirty years his junior. Diana immediately began a very public affair with Joss Hay, Earl of Erroll. Broughton eventually conceded to the idea of Diana deserting him and marrying Erroll, due to a prenuptial agreement they had made, that she could abandon him if she became enamoured with another man.

However, Erroll was murdered in January 1941. Broughton was considered a major suspect. He was arrested by the police and tried for the murder of Erroll. Due to lack of evidence and to ballistic considerations, he was acquitted. Juanita Carberry, daughter of John Carberry (10th Baron Carbery), maintains that Broughton confessed the murder to her soon after his acquittal. Diana quickly divorced Broughton. He returned to England, where he committed suicide by barbiturate overdose in 1942.

=== Diana, Lady Delamere ===
Born Diana Caldwell (1913–1987), she relocated to the Happy Valley in late 1940, together with her new husband, Sir John "Jock" Delves Broughton, a Baronet with extensive landed estates in England. She almost immediately began a very public affair with the local celebrity Joss Hay, Earl of Erroll. She planned to divorce Broughton and marry Erroll. Broughton supposedly gave his blessings.

Erroll was discovered murdered in his car in January 1941. Broughton was charged with his murder but was acquitted by the trial. Diana assisted her husband, but after the trial accused him of being the murderer and abandoned him.

After her divorce from Broughton, she married Gilbert Colvile in 1943, one of the wealthiest and most powerful landowners in Kenya and inherited much of his fortune. They adopted a daughter. In 1955, Diana married Thomas Cholmondeley, 4th Baron Delamere, and increased her land fortune. For many years during the 1960s and 1970s and until the death of her lesbian lover, Diana lived in a three-way relationship with her husband and Lady Patricia Fairweather (daughter of the 2nd Earl of Inchcape).

=== Leone, Cavaliere Galton-Fenzi ===
Leone, Cavaliere Galton-Fenzi was the founder of the Royal East African Automobile Association, REAAA, in 1919 and honorary secretary until his death on 15 May 1937. He was the first man to drive from Nairobi to Mombasa in January 1926 in a car of the brand Riley. There is a monument to this effect on Kenyatta Avenue.

In 1923, Galton Fenzi started negotiating for loan cars so that they could be tested in East African conditions. He received several vehicles, notably among them a Riley 12/50 from the Riley Motor Car Co. Ltd. of Coventry, which was used by Fenzi and Captain Gethin to pioneer a route from Nairobi to Mombasa in January 1926, a distance of 480 kilometres (300 mi). He also pioneered the Nairobi – Dar es Salaam to Malawi route, and the Nairobi-Khartoum route.

The EA Standard of 1924 quotes: 'Galton Fenzi is always doing things, and he does them so quickly the public has no time to recover its breath!’.

=== Others ===
Others included Gilbert Colvile, Hugh Dickenson, Jack and Nina Soames, Lady June Carberry (stepmother of Juanita Carberry), Dickie Pembroke, and Julian Lezzard. Author Karen Blixen (Isak Dinesen) was a friend of members of the group, and writer and pilot Beryl Markham associated frequently with the Happy Valley set.

== See also ==
- Oserian
- Mount Kenya
- Errol Trzebinski
- Whites in Kenya
- Lake Naivasha Country Club – site from the period
- Nyeri – town from the period

== Sources ==
- Barnes, Juliet (2013). The Ghosts of Happy Valley. Aurum Press. ISBN 978-1781310854.
- Best, Nicholas (1979). Happy Valley: The Story of the English in Kenya. London: Secker & Warburg. ISBN 0-436-04255-X.
- Carberry, Juanita; Tyrer, Nicola (1999). Child of the Happy Valley: A Memoir. London: W. Heinemann. ISBN 0434007293.
- Fox, James (1982). White Mischief. Jonathan Cape. ISBN 978-0224017312.
- Huxley, Elspeth (2000) [1959]. The Flame Trees of Thika: Memories of an African Childhood. Penguin. ISBN 1101651393.
- Osborne, Frances (2 June 2009). The Bolter. Knopf Doubleday Publishing Group. ISBN 978-0307272324.
- Spicer, Paul (2010). The Temptress: The Scandalous Life of Alice, Countess of De Janze. Simon and Schuster. ISBN 978-1847377821.
