= Lady Idina Sackville =

English aristocrat

- Born: Myra Idina Sackville; 26 February 1893; Withyham, Sussex
- Died: 5 November 1955 (aged 62); Mombasa, Kenya
- Spouses: Euan Wallace (m. 1913; div. 1919) Charles Gordon (m. 1919; div. 1923) Josslyn Hay, 22nd Earl of Erroll (m. 1923; div. 1929) Donald Carmichael Haldeman (m. 1930; div. 1938) William Vincent Soltau (m. 1939; div. 1946)
- Children: David John Wallace; Gerard Euan Wallace; Diana Hay, 23rd Countess of Erroll
- Parents: Gilbert Sackville, 8th Earl De La Warr; Lady Muriel Agnes Brassey

Lady Myra Idina Sackville-West (26 February 1893 – 5 November 1955) was an English aristocrat and member of the Happy Valley set. Divorced five times, Lady Idina's behaviour and lifestyle scandalised upper-class British society.

== Early life ==
Lady Myra Idina Sackville-West (her family, descended of the House of De La Warr West, usually omitted the "West") was born in 1893 at Buckhurst Park, her family's seat in Sussex. She was known by her middle name, Idina. She was the daughter of Lady Muriel Agnes Brassey and Gilbert Sackville-West, Viscount Cantelupe (1869–1915), who in 1896 succeeded his father as the 8th Earl De La Warr. She had two younger siblings, sister Lady Avice (wife of Sir Stewart Menzies) and brother Herbrand. After her parents divorced in 1902, as a result of her father's adultery with an actress, he remarried to Hilda Mary Clavering Tredcroft, daughter of Colonel Charles Lennox Tredcroft. Her mother went on to support a range of causes including women's suffrage.

Her paternal grandparents were Reginald Sackville, 7th Earl De La Warr and the Hon. Constance Baillie-Cochrane (daughter of Alexander Baillie-Cochrane, 1st Baron Lamington). Her cousin was the writer Vita Sackville-West (only child of cousins Victoria Sackville-West and Lionel Sackville-West, 3rd Baron Sackville). Her maternal grandparents were Thomas Brassey, 1st Earl Brassey, and author Anna Allnutt. Her maternal great grandfather was merchant John Allnutt, her uncle was Thomas Brassey, 2nd Earl Brassey, and her aunt was Marie Freeman-Thomas, Marchioness of Willingdon.

== Personal life ==
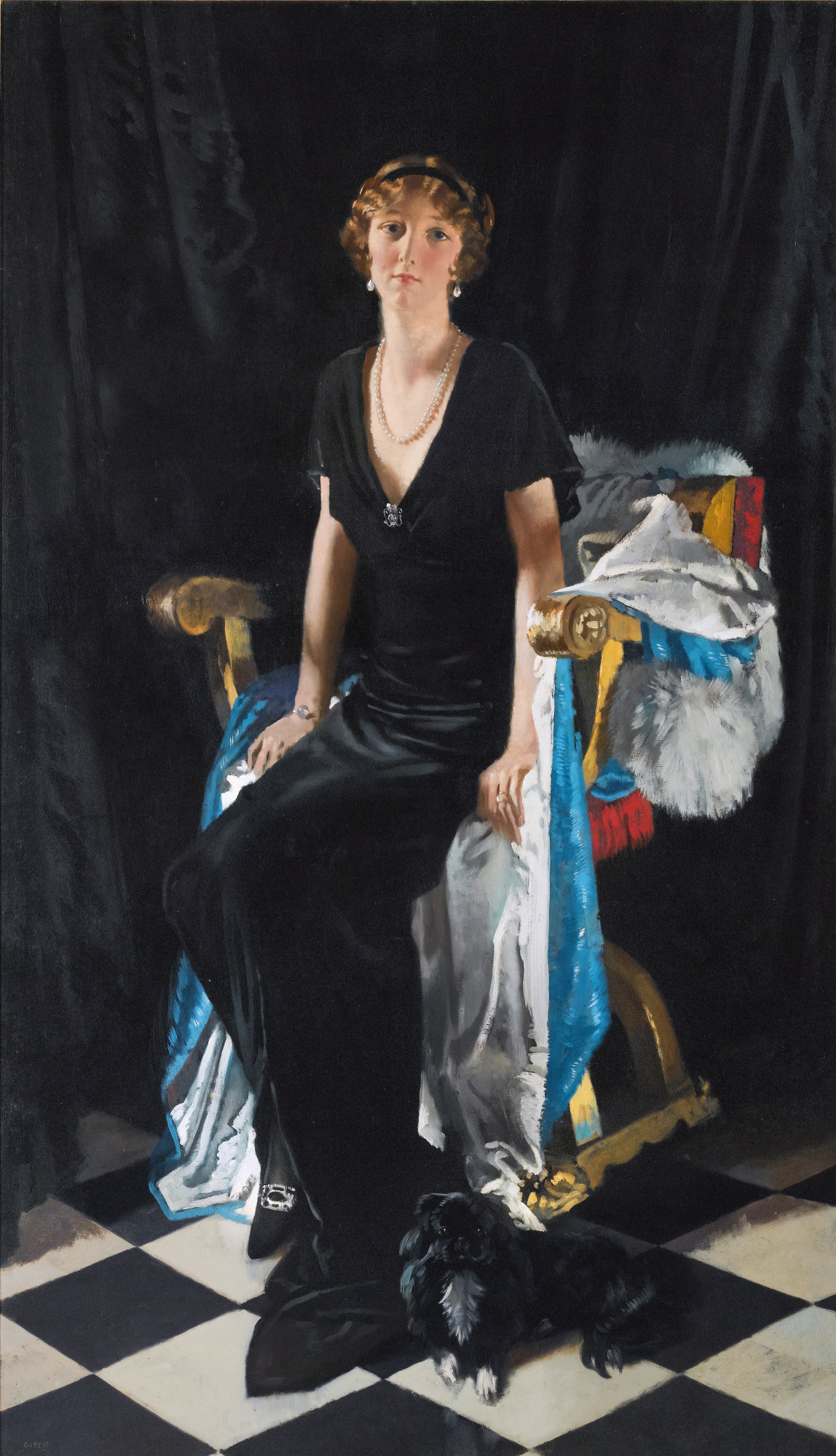
Portrait of Lady Idina Wallace, by William Orpen, 1915.

Lady Idina married and divorced five times. At the age of 20, she married Rt. Hon. Captain David Euan Wallace (d. 1941), the son of John Wallace of Glassingall, on 26 November 1913. In homage to her childhood home, Lady Idina designed Kildonan House, Barrhill, South Ayrshire with the architect James Miller. She never saw the building finished, however, having split from Wallace before its completion. Before their divorce in 1919, they were the parents of two sons who were both later killed in action during the Second World War:

- Maj. David John Wallace (1914–1944), who married Joan Prudence Magor in 1939. He studied for two years in Athens at the British School of Archaeology and was fluent in Greek. He was serving as a press attaché with the British Embassy before the war. He served in the British Legion repelling the Italians in 1940, but fled to Cairo when the country was overrun by Germany in April 1941; in 1943, he returned to Greece to fight alongside the Greek troops. He was killed by German machine gun fire while attempting to take the village of Menina in Thesprotia. His widow married Gerald Frederick Walter de Winton in 1948.
- Gerard Euan Wallace (1915–1943), who married Elizabeth Lawson, in 1940. He was also killed in action during World War II.

After their divorce, her first husband took custody of their sons and he remarried to Barbara Lutyens (the daughter of Sir Edwin Landseer Lutyens) in May 1920.

On 27 March 1919, she married Capt. Charles Gordon of Park Hill, Aberdeen, the second son of Alexander Gordon-Cuming-Skene (later Gordon) of Pitlurg and the former Ada Wilson. They divorced, without issue, in 1923.

On 22 September 1923, she married for the third time, to Josslyn Hay, Lord Kilmarnock and was thus styled Lady Kilmarnock. They moved to Kenya in 1924, financing the move with Idina's money. Their home was a bungalow on the slopes of the Aberdare Range which they called Slains, after the former Hay family seat of Slains Castle which had been sold by Hay's grandfather, the 20th Earl, in 1916. The bungalow was sited alongside the high altitude farms which other white Kenyans were establishing at the time. After his father's death in 1928, he became the 22nd Earl of Erroll and Idina became the Countess of Erroll. The Happy Valley set were a group of elite, colonial expatriates who became notorious for drug use, drinking, adultery and promiscuity. She and her husband soon became a part of this group and accumulated debts leading to their subsequent divorce, brought on by him cheating her financially. They had one child together:

- Diana Denyse Hay, 23rd Countess of Erroll (1926–1978), who married Sir Iain Moncreiffe of that Ilk in 1946. They divorced in 1964 and, later that year, she married Maj. Raymond Carnegie, a grandson of Charles Carnegie, 7th Earl of Southesk.

After the divorce, their daughter Diana was taken home to England to be raised firstly by her uncle Herbrand Sackville, 9th Earl De La Warr, and then by her aunt Lady Avice Spicer in Wiltshire. In 1930, Lord Erroll married Edith Maude ("Molly") Ramsay-Hill, who had been named in their divorce. She died in 1939 and the following year, Lord Erroll met, and subsequently had an affair with Diana, Lady Broughton, the wife of Sir Jock Delves Broughton, Bt. Sir Jock found out about the affair and in 1941, Lord Erroll was found shot dead in his Buick in Kenya. The murder was never solved but Sir Jock committed suicide not long thereafter.

On 22 November 1930, Lady Idina married Donald Carmichael Haldeman, at the Shoreham Register Office in Kent. Haldeman, an Eton graduate and former soldier with the 19th Royal Hussars, was a son of John Haldeman. They divorced in 1938, without issue. In 1939, she married F/Lt William Vincent Soltau of the Royal Air Force. They divorced, without issue, in 1946.

Lady Idina died in 1955 at the age of 62. Soltau died on 1 August 1964.

=== Descendants ===
Through her eldest son David, she was a grandmother of Cary Davina Wallace (wife of David Howell, Baron Howell of Guildford and mother of Frances (née Howell) Osborne, the author of The Bolter, a biography of Idina, and wife of former Chancellor of the Exchequer George Osborne), and Laura Jacqueline Wallace (b. 1941), who married Dominic Paul Morland in 1963, and, secondly, Keith Fitchett, in 2003.

== In popular culture ==
- The notorious Happy Valley set was depicted in White Mischief, a film dramatising the events surrounding the murder of Lady Idina's third husband Josslyn Hay, 22nd Earl of Erroll based on the book of the same name by James Fox.
- Nancy Mitford based her character "the Bolter" on Lady Idina in three of her books including The Pursuit of Love and Love in a Cold Climate.
- In the 1920s, the writer Michael Arlen published The Green Hat, a novel whose heroine, Iris Storm, is based on Lady Idina Sackville. This book was turned into a movie, A Woman of Affairs, starring Greta Garbo.
- Lady Idina's great-granddaughter through her eldest son David Wallace, Frances Osborne, wrote a biography, The Bolter, which was published in 2008 by Virago Press. The 2009 paperback edition has a revealing Afterword following a letter from Vincent Soltau's daughter, who with her brother was cared for by Lady Idina at her house 'Clouds' in Kenya for eight years.
- Taylor Swift's 2024 song "The Bolter" seems to be inspired by Lady Idina's serial monogamy.
