= White Mischief (novel) =

1982 novel by James Fox

- First edition
- Author: James Fox
- Language: English
- Publisher: Jonathan Cape (UK)
- Publication date: 1982
- Publication place: United Kingdom
- Media type: Print (hardback & paperback)
- Pages: 299

White Mischief is a non-fiction book by British journalist James Fox, first published in hardback by Jonathan Cape in 1982 and in paperback in 1984 by Penguin. The book is an account of the unsolved murder in 1941 of Josslyn Hay, 22nd Earl of Erroll, a British expatriate in Kenya. The title is a pun on the title of Evelyn Waugh's novel Black Mischief (1932). The book was adapted as a film of the same name in 1987.

== Synopsis ==
Part novel and part journalistic report, the book is divided into two distinct sections. Initially presented as a classic murder mystery, the first part of the story focuses on the dissolute lifestyles of the wealthy elite in colonial Kenya. Casual affairs, wife-swapping, habitual drunkenness and cocaine abuse were all common. The main protagonists are the victim, Josslyn Hay, a handsome womanising aristocrat; his beautiful married lover Lady Diana Broughton; and Diana’s much older husband Sir Jock Delves Broughton. Although the identity of the murderer has never been discovered, the author claims to have found new evidence pointing to Sir Jock Delves Broughton, and the second part of the book concentrates on the author’s investigations and his interviews with surviving participants in the drama, both in Kenya and in the United Kingdom.

== Film adaptation ==
White Mischief, released in 1987, was directed by Michael Radford, and stars Charles Dance, Greta Scacchi and Joss Ackland.
