= Walter Harragin =

British colonial officer (1890–1966)

Sir Walter Harragin CMG QC (1890 – 26 June 1966) was a British colonial barrister, judge and administrator.

== Early life ==
Harragin was born in British Guyana. He was educated at Berkhamsted School and was called to the bar at Gray's Inn in 1912.

== Career ==
He began his career as a clerk of the peace in San Fernando, Trinidad and Tobago, in 1914. During the First World War he was on active military service between 1916 and 1918, returning to Trinidad as a magistrate in 1919 and later being elevated to the Crown Court in 1924. He was later promoted to Attorney General first of Nyasaland between 1927 and 1933, and then Kenya until 1944. Whilst in Kenya he prosecuted for the Crown during the trial of Jock Delves Broughton for the murder of Lord Erroll. He briefly served as Chief Secretary of Kenya between 1938 and 1939 and Acting Governor between 1939 and 1940.

In January 1941 he was appointed to the Most Distinguished Order of Saint Michael and Saint George. In 1943 he was appointed Chief Justice of the Gold Coast Colony and remained in the role until 1947. On retiring from his position in the Gold Coast he was made a Judge of the High Courts of Basutoland, Bechuanaland Protectorate and Swaziland. He served as President of the Court of Appeal from 1964 until his death in 1966.
