= Juanita Carberry =

Kenyan writer (1925–2013)

- in 1987
- Born: May 7, 1925; Nyeri
- Died: July 27, 2013 (aged 88); London
- Occupation: writer
- Writing career
- Genre: autobiography

Juanita Virginia Sistare Carberry (May 7, 1925 – July 27, 2013) was a Kenyan writer who later said that she knew who carried out a high profile murder. A BBC drama about the murder was told from her point of view. She published a book about her family, the Happy Valley set and the murder of Josslyn Victor Hay, the 22nd Earl of Erroll. She donated her dead body for exhibition.

== Life ==
Carberry was born in Nyeri in 1925. Her mother and her de facto father, John Carberry, lived in Kenya and were part of the Happy Valley set, a group of White Kenyans who were known for their excesses and promiscuity. Her father was Lord Carbery, (Note: There is one R in the title and two in the family name.) the 10th baron and sixth baronet; he was known for his Nazi sympathies, his love of flying and his cruelty. He was known for showing off his aircraft and flying at agricultural shows. Her mother had died in an air crash when Juanita was three. Her mother's family blamed Lord Carbery as he had persuaded her to perform in an air show. Her father did not care for the young Juanita and the family employed a governess for her. Her father would instruct the governess to inflict beatings on his daughter.

in 1941, when she was fifteen the murder took place. Sir Henry “Jock” Delves Broughton was later tried for the murder of Josslyn Hay, 22nd Earl of Erroll. In the same year she left home and by 1942 she was employed on the First Aid Nursing Yeomanry. She later moved to the Royal Corps of Signals. She was an early woman recruit into the merchant navy. When she joined, there were only two ships that would employ women. She was later known for the rough use of language she had acquired while at sea.

In 1987 the BBC broadcast The Happy Valley, a drama about the murder of Josslyn Victor Hay, the 22nd Earl of Erroll. The main suspect was a friend of her father. The murder was also the basis for a 1982 book and the 1987 film White Mischief.

She co-authored a "Child of Happy Valley: A Memoir" in 1991.

Carberry was a supporter of animal charities and the euthanasia society Dignity in Dying. She died in a London hospice where she complained that although they looked after her well they would not "put her down". She donated her tattooed body for exhibition by Gunther von Hagens.

The murder and the Happy Valley Set continue to be the subject of news stories.
