= De Janzé =

de Janzé is a surname, and may refer to:

- Alice de Janzé (1899–1941), American heiress, first wife of Frédéric de Janzé
- Frédéric de Janzé (1896−1933), French sportsman and writer
- Léon de Janzé (1848–1911), French sports leader and politician, father of Frédéric de Janzé
