= Janzé (disambiguation) =

Janzé is a town in Brittany, France.

- de Janzé, surname
