= Beryl Markham: A Shadow on the Sun =

American-British TV series

- Based on: The Beryl Markham Mystery, Vanity Fair article by James Fox
- Written by: Allan Scott
- Directed by: Tony Richardson
- Starring: Stefanie Powers
- Original language: English

Production
- Producers: Tamara Asseyev; Stephanie Powers
- Cinematography: Steve Yaconelli
- Production company: New World Television

Original release
- Network: CBS
- Release: May 15 – May 17, 1988

Beryl Markham: A Shadow on the Sun is a 1988 American-British TV mini-series starring Stefanie Powers. It was directed by Tony Richardson and was written by journalist James Fox and screenwriter Allan Scott, based on interviews Fox conducted when researching White Mischief. It was filmed on location in Limuru, Kenya. It traces Beryl's life from a 18-year-old equestrian to a lonely 82-year-old and focuses more on her personal life than her achievements as an aviator.

== Cast ==
- Stefanie Powers as Beryl Markham
- Claire Bloom as Gwladys, Lady Delamere
- Peter Bowles as Lord John (Jack) Carberry
- Trevor Eve as Denys Finch Hatton
- James Fox as Mansfield Markham, Beryl Markham's second husband
- Frederic Forrest as Raoul Schumacher, Markham's third husband
- Jack Thompson as Tom Campbell Black

== Production ==
It was one of a number of productions where Jack Thompson played a romantic leading man to an American star.

== Reception ==
The Globe and Mail said "Although the film includes daring flying exploits and exciting racetrack scenes, it focuses on Markham's enigmatic personal life. The Los Angeles Times said the series included "frequent, evasive shallowness" and seemed to rely a lot on Markham's own recollections and point of view, but that "Powers gives the performance of her life". The New York Times agrees that "Ms. Powers is certainly an inspired choice for the lead role" but that "the film occasionally turns irritatingly sketchy." It concludes though that the series "is nearly always intriguing and, thanks to Steve Yaconelli's photography, decidedly handsome. People magazine likewise described the film as "a series of biographical vignettes, not as a cohesive drama".
