= Naivasha Airport =

- IATA: none; ICAO: HKNV

Summary
- Airport type: Public, Civilian
- Owner: Kenya Airports Authority
- Serves: Naivasha, Kenya
- Location: Naivasha, Kenya
- Elevation AMSL: 6,380 ft (1,940 m)
- Coordinates: 00°47′06″S 36°26′02″E

Map
- Location of Naivasha Airport in Kenya; Placement on map is approximate

Runways
Direction	Length		Surface
Direction	ft	m	Surface
01/19	3,616	1,102	Asphalt

Naivasha Airport is an airport in Naivasha, Kenya.

== Location ==
Naivasha Airport (ICAO: HKNV) is located in Nakuru County, in the town of Naivasha, at a location called Karagite, approximately 90 kilometres (56 mi), by road, northwest of Nairobi, the capital of the Republic of Kenya and the largest city in that country.

Its location lies approximately 87 kilometres (54 mi), by air, northwest of Nairobi International Airport, the country's largest civilian airport. The geographic coordinates of this airport are:0° 47' 6.00"S, 36° 26' 2.00"E (Latitude:-0.785000; Longitude:36.433890).

== Overview ==
Naivasha Airport is a small civilian airport, serving the town of Naivasha and surrounding communities. The airport is situated 1,940 metres (6,380 ft) above sea level. Naivasha has a single asphalt runway that is 1,102 metres (3,616 ft) long.

== Airlines and destinations ==
Airlines	Destinations
Safarlink	Maasai Mara, Nairobi–Wilson

== See also ==
- Kenya Airports Authority
- Kenya Civil Aviation Authority
- List of airports in Kenya
