= Oserian =

Flower farm on Lake Naivasha, Nakuru County, Kenya

- Town/City: Lake Naivasha, Nakuru County
- Country: Kenya
- Established: 1969
- Produces: Geothermal and solar energy

Oserian (Masai, "Place of Peace") is a large area of land on the south shores of Lake Naivasha, Nakuru County, Kenya. Oserian's wildlife corridor is more than 1.6 km (1 mi) in width and reaches the lake. It occupies more than 6 km (4 mi) of shoreline.

== History ==
One of the significant landmarks in the area is the Gin Palace (later, Djinn Palace) which was originally a country estate, the Moorish-style mansion was built in 1927 by Major Cyril Ramsay-Hill, a rancher, former officer in an Indian regiment, and sometime Hollywood actor. It was based on his grandmother's home in Seville, Spain. The crenellated and domed building features minarets, and contains an "inner courtyard, fountains, squash court, swimming pool, and polo grounds".

During the colonial era, the Djinn Palace was "where things usually were very lively" for the Happy Valley set, according to Ulf Aschan. It was built for Ramsay-Hill's wife, Molly (née Edith Mildred Maude; 1893–1939), who had an affair with and later married Josslyn Hay, 22nd Earl of Erroll.

In 1969, Oserian was established as a small vegetable growing farm. In 1982, it became the first flower farm on Lake Naivasha and was once one of the largest flower farms in the world. The flower farm and its business was divested in 2021 to Bohemian Flowers.

Oserian's first geothermal power plant was a binary plant commissioned in 2004 followed in 2007 by the construction and commissioning of a second geothermal power station. The reorganisation of Oserian resulted in its primary business now being energy production (geothermal and solar energy).
