= White Mischief (film) =

- Theatrical release poster
- Directed by: Michael Radford
- Screenplay by: Michael Radford; Jonathan Gems
- Based on: White Mischief (1982 book) by James Fox
- Produced by: Simon Perry
- Starring: Greta Scacchi; Charles Dance; Joss Ackland; Sarah Miles; Geraldine Chaplin; Ray McAnally; Murray Head; John Hurt; Trevor Howard
- Cinematography: Roger Deakins
- Edited by: Tom Priestley
- Music by: George Fenton
- Production companies: Columbia Pictures; Nelson Entertainment; Goldcrest; Umbrella Films; Power Tower Investments; BBC Film; Curzon Film Distributors; British Screen
- Distributed by: Columbia Pictures (through Columbia-Cannon-Warner Distributors)
- Release date: November 10, 1987 (UK)
- Running time: 107 minutes
- Country: United Kingdom
- Language: English
- Budget: £8 million or $8.5 million
- Box office: £1.5 million (UK) $3.1 million (US/Canada)

White Mischief is a 1987 British period crime drama film directed and co-written by Michael Radford. It dramatises the events of the Happy Valley murder case in Kenya in 1941, wherein Sir Henry “Jock” Delves Broughton was tried for the murder of Josslyn Hay, 22nd Earl of Erroll. The film stars Greta Scacchi, Charles Dance, Joss Ackland, Sarah Miles, Geraldine Chaplin, Ray McAnally, Murray Head, John Hurt, and Trevor Howard.

The screenplay is based on the non-fiction book White Mischief: The Murder of Lord Erroll (1982), by James Fox, which originated from a newspaper article published in 1969. Shooting took place on-location in Kenya and at Shepperton Studios.

At the 42nd British Academy Film Awards, the film was nominated for Best Actor in a Supporting Role (for Joss Ackland) and Best Costume Design.

The film came out around the same time as a BBC series set against the background of the same crime, The Happy Valley (1987).

== Plot ==
Throughout the Second World War, aristocrats in the Kenya Colony's Happy Valley region often led hedonistic lifestyles of indulgence in alcohol, drugs, and extramarital relationships. On 24 January 1941, Josslyn Hay, the philandering Earl of Erroll, was found dead in his car in a secluded area, with his reputation for adulterous relationships preceding him.

One such married woman is Diana Delves Broughton, the beautiful wife of Sir John Henry Delves Broughton, known as "Jock", who is thirty years her senior, with whom she has a pre-nuptial understanding that, should either of them fall in love with someone else, the other party would not impede that romance.

Diana has indeed succumbed to the charms of the Earl of Erroll, whose other lovers include the drug-addicted American heiress Alice de Janzé and the more reserved Nina Soames. The Earl is more serious about this affair than any of his earlier dalliances, and wants Diana to marry him. She is reluctant to leave what she thinks is the financial security of her marriage to formalise her relationship with Erroll (who has no funds or prospects), unaware that her husband is deep in debt. Privately humiliated but appearing to honour their agreement, Delves Broughton publicly toasts the couple's affair at the club in Nairobi, asking Erroll to bring Diana home at a specified time. Delves Broughton appears to be extremely intoxicated for the rest of the evening; once he is alone it is clear he was feigning drunkenness. After dropping off Diana, Erroll is shot dead in his car near the home of Delves Broughton, who is soon charged with the murder.

Diana is distraught over losing her lover, as is Alice, who openly masturbates next to his corpse at the mortuary. A local plantation owner, Gilbert Colvile, whose only friend is Delves Broughton, quietly offers Diana advice and solace and ultimately shocks her by proposing marriage.

Delves Broughton stands trial. There are no witnesses to the crime and the physical evidence that appears incriminating is also circumstantial. He obviously had the motive and means, but is found innocent, and the scandal comes to an end. De Janzé ultimately kills herself, and Diana discovers further evidence that implicates her husband in her lover's death. After killing their dog and then menacing her with a shotgun, Broughton shoots himself in front of her. The film ends with a fleeing, bloodstained Diana discovering the remaining Happy Valley set partying around de Janzé's grave.

== Cast ==
- Greta Scacchi as Diana Broughton
- Joss Ackland as Sir Henry "Jock" Delves Broughton, 11th Baronet
- Charles Dance as Josslyn Hay, Earl of Erroll
- Sarah Miles as Alice de Janzé
- Geraldine Chaplin as Nina Soames
- Ray McAnally as Morris
- Murray Head as Lizzie
- John Hurt as Gilbert Colvile
- Trevor Howard as Jack Soames
- Susan Fleetwood as Gwladys Delamere
- Catherine Neilson as June Carbery
- Hugh Grant as Hugh Dickinson
- Alan Dobie as Sir Walter Harragin
- Jacqueline Pearce as Idina Soltau

== Original book ==
In 1969, James Fox and Cyril Connolly began investigating the case for an article in The Sunday Times called "Christmas at Karen." After Connolly died in 1974, Fox inherited his notes and theories, and returned to Kenya to undertake further research. The result was the book White Mischief, published in 1982. The title came from Black Mischief, Evelyn Waugh's satirical novel set in the mythical African kingdom of Azania. The New York Times called it "a fascinating book." The Boston Globe said "had ‘White Mischief’ been a work of fiction it would have required the collaboration of Agatha Christie and P. G. Wodehouse." While researching the book Fox also collected information about Beryl Markham, which was turned into the film A Shadow on the Sun.

== Development ==
The film rights to the book were optioned by Michael White, a friend of Fox's, while the book was being written.

Director Michael Radford collaborated with British playwright Jonathan Gems on the script. Radford emphasized that "films of Africa should be made by Africans" and described the project as "a film of melancholy about people who have everything and yet have nothing. It's about people who want to possess what they can't possess."

Securing funding for the film posed a challenge. The financing was sourced from a chain of Canadian cinemas, Cineplex Odeon, plus Goldcrest Films, BBC Television, Nelson Entertainment (headed by Barry Spikings, which provided $2.5 million in exchange for North American video rights), with the remaining amount coming from Columbia Pictures, then under David Puttnam as head of production.

Richard Attenborough was offered and turned down the lead role, because he wanted to focus on directing films.

== Shooting ==
Filming took place from February to May 1987 at Shepperton Studios and on location in Kenya. Wrotham Park was used as Doddington Hall, the home of Delves Broughton.

== Historical accuracy ==
The real Alice De Janzé shot herself on 30 September 1941, while Jock Delves Broughton eventually returned to England and committed suicide by morphine overdose in the Adelphi Hotel in Liverpool in December 1942, over a year later.

"There is a difference between fact and truth," said producer Simon Perry. "You can be truthful without being factual. It's inevitable there will be people who think Kenya was and still is a paradise of remittance men and black sheep of aristocratic families. Kenya was an exaggerated microcosm of society in Britain at that time, painted in primary colours with characters larger than life."

Sir Jock Broughton's son, Sir Evelyn, complained that the film depicted his father as a murderer. He said his father was too drunk that night to have committed the crime and that Diana was more likely to have done it.

Diana Broughton died in 1987.

== Reception ==
=== Box office ===
The film grossed £1,532,903 in the United Kingdom and $3.1 million in the United States and Canada. It lost money during its theatrical release, however, Jake Eberts reported that Goldcrest Films invested £1,300,000 in the film, and received £1,633,000, earning them a profit of £333,000.

=== Critical ===
Variety wrote the film "displays high production values, impressive acting talent, and a strong — virtually factual — storyline. The money invested can be seen on the screen, and with an excellent lead performance (following his major role in ‘‘The Sicilian’’) Joss Ackland should finally receive the acting kudos he deserves. Pic should make a healthy b.o. impact worldwide."

Book author James Fox said he was "ambivalent" about the movie.

Radford said the reviews of the film " almost ruined my career. It stopped it in its tracks... I think it was difficult for critics because Britain is obsessed by class. It wasn’t done to make a film about upper-class people. I think people were expecting one of those James Ivory films or A Passage to India... It wasn’t meant to be like Out of Africa, the cinema of waxed furniture. I was trying to make something much more decadent."

== Legacy ==
In 1996, Mariette Bosch murdered Ria Wolmerans in Botswana. Both women were white South Africans. The case was referred to as "Botswana's white mischief".

== See also ==
- The Happy Valley, a BBC television drama also dealing with the murder, was first aired on 6 September 1987, two months before White Mischief was released.

== Notes ==
- Falsetto, Mario (1999). Personal visions : conversations with independent film-makers. Constable.
