= William John Hennessy =

Irish-American artist (1839–1917)

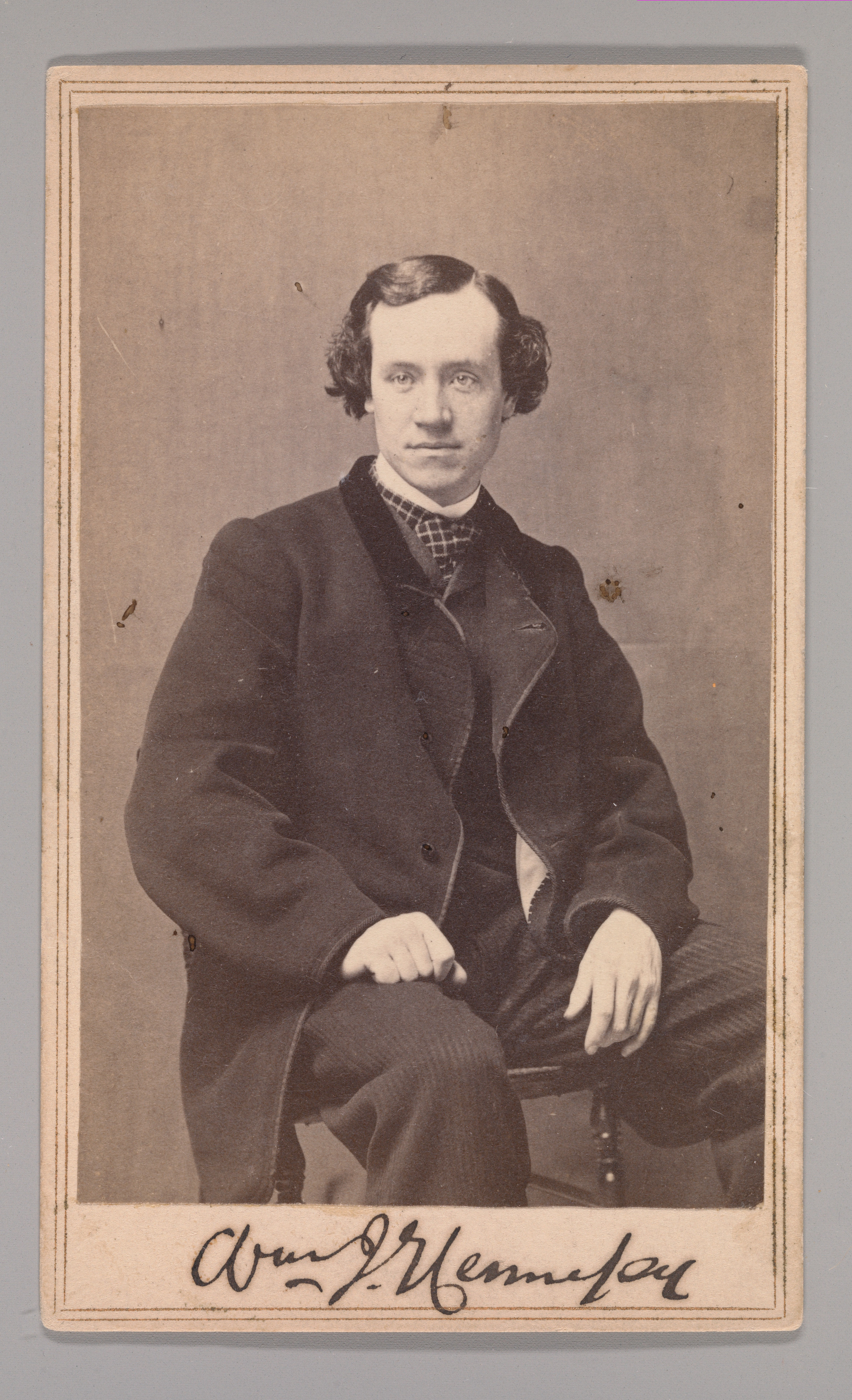
- Hennessy's carte-de-visite
- Born: 11 July 1839; Thomastown, County Kilkenny, Ireland
- Died: 27 December 1917 (aged 78); Rudgwick, Sussex, England

William John Hennessy (11 July 1839 – 27 December 1917) was an Irish-American artist.

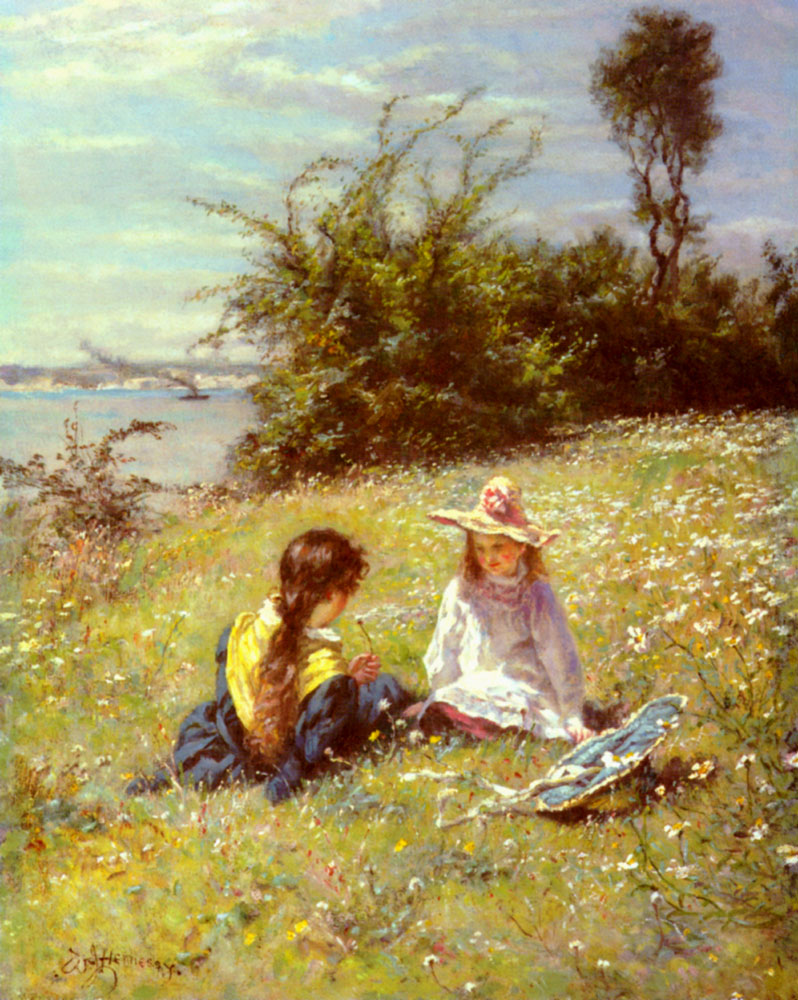
The Dandelion Clock by William John Hennessy

== Life ==
William John Hennessy (originally Ó hAonghusa) was born in Thomastown, County Kilkenny on 11 July 1839. His father, John Hennessy, was forced to leave Ireland in 1848 as a result of his involvement in the Young Ireland movement. He landed in Canada and settled in New York City. Hennessy, his mother Catherine (née Laffin), and brother joined their father there in July 1849. He gained admittance to the National Academy of Design in 1854 and exhibited his first works there.

Hennessy was very skilled in wood engraving and was hired to illustrate the works of renowned poets, including that of Tennyson, Longfellow and Whittier. As an American he became the co-founder of the Artists' Fund Society, and an honorary member of the American Society of Painters in Watercolours. In 1870 he moved to London where he became a member of the Royal Institute of Oil Painters in 1902. Between 1879 and 1907 the Royal Hibernian Academy displayed eight of his paintings. He moved to Normandy in 1875, and continued to visit London frequently. He returned to England in 1893 to live in Brighton, and later Rudgwick, Sussex but visited France often. He died in Rudgwick on 27 December 1917.

== Family ==
He was married around 1868 to Charlotte Mather (1842-1940), from New Haven, Connecticut, a descendant of the old New England Mather family, and had by her four children:

- Marguerite "Moya" (1868-1941) married Léon de Janzé (1848-1910) at the Château de Parfondeval, France. They were the parents of sportsman and writer Frédéric de Janzé.
- Eleanor "Norah" (1872-1958) married in 1915 Paul Ayshford Methuen, 4th Baron Methuen (1886-1974), at Corsham Court.
- Philip (1873-1954).
- Kathleen.
