= The Happy Valley =

1987 television film directed by Ross Devenish

The Happy Valley is a British television drama, first shown on BBC1 on 6 September 1987 in the Sunday Premiere strand. It was written by David Reid, directed by Ross Devenish, and produced by Cedric Messina. It stars Holly Aird as Juanita Carberry, Michael Byrne as her violent father, and Denholm Elliott as Jock Delves Broughton.

== Plot ==
It is set in the British colony of Kenya in the 1940s, and tells the true story of the murder of Josslyn Victor Hay, the 22nd Earl of Erroll, as seen through the eyes of 15-year-old Juanita Carberry, the daughter of John Carberry, a friend of Broughton's.

== Cast ==
- Denholm Elliott as Sir Henry 'Jock' Delves Broughton
- Holly Aird as Juanita Carberry
- Kathryn Pogson as June Carberry
- Michael Byrne as John Carberry
- Cathryn Harrison as Helen Tapsell
- Amanda Hillwood as Lady Diana Delves Broughton
- Peter Sands as Lord Erroll
- Richard Heffer as Asst. Supt. Poppy
- Mawa Makondo as Warganjo
- Kavundla as Gatimu
- Roshan Seth as Defence Solicitor
- Frank Lazarus as Doctor
- John Cartwright as Constable
- Abdulla Sunado as Witchdoctor
- Oliver Rowe as Ian Eatwell

== Storyline remake ==
Lord Erroll's murder was also dramatised in the feature film White Mischief, which was released seven months after the first transmission of The Happy Valley.

== See also ==
- Happy Valley set
