= Lake Naivasha Country Club =

The Lake Naivasha Country Club is across the lake from Naivasha township, northwest of Nairobi (click map to enlarge)

The Lake Naivasha Country Club is located on the opposite shore of Lake Naivasha from the town of Naivasha, Kenya.

Built using old colonial architecture and opened in 1937, Lake Naivasha Country Club provides accommodation in rooms and cottages across 12 ha (30 acres) of green lawns shaded by mature acacias and fever trees. The public rooms also display the British colonial style. The residents' lounge has a massive fireplace and large bay windows. The bar adjoins a billiards room, for playing billiards and snooker in the British tradition.

Views across Lake Naivasha are dominated by the shadow of Mount Longonot, 2,777 m (9,111 ft) high, a dormant volcano which, in 1983, was declared a Kenyan national park (52 km^{2}). Mount Longonot also can be seen from the eastern escarpment on the scenic highway to the region.

== History ==
The Lake Naivasha Country Club opened in 1937 as an intermediate staging post for Imperial Airways' flying boat (seaplane) service travelling from Durban to London. Previously known as the "Lake Hotel" in the 1930s, there were papyrus-thatched chalets.

The area was popular with members of the Happy Valley set during the years between the World Wars. Also on the shores of Lake Naivasha is the Djinn Palace, which gained notoriety in the Happy Valley days.

In 2008 the hotel was transferred from Block Hotels Group to Kenya Hotels Ltd who also run the Lake Baringo Club.

== Activities ==
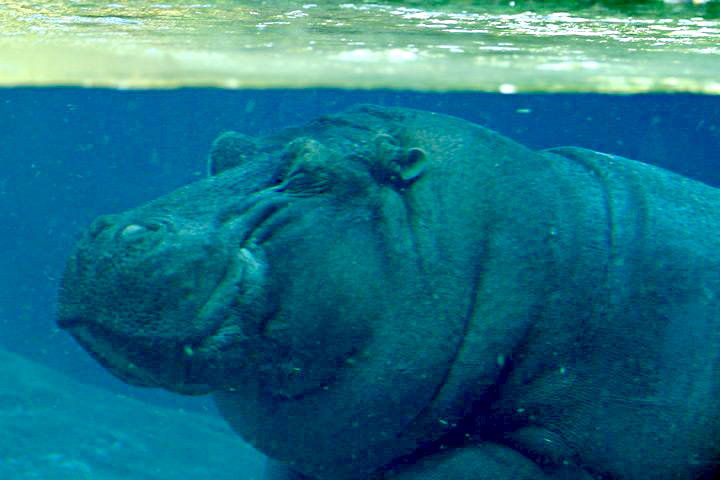
A submerged Hippopotamus

There is fishing for black bass and tilapia, and a boat trip during the day provides a close view of Naivasha's wide variety of birdlife and its hippo colonies.

Crescent Island, 15 minutes away by boat, is a private game sanctuary, with zebra, wildebeest, gazelle, vervet monkeys, hares, genet cats, waterbuck and giraffe. Crescent Island is one of the few places in Africa where people can wander on foot among herds of antelope since there are no predators on the island. LNCC will arrange boat trips for a reasonable charge.

Naivasha is also a site for birdwatching, with over 300 species of birds on display: three bird walks a day have been offered along the grounds of the country club, including early morning bird walks which are particularly good for rare sightings of birds. They have a bird-sighting book available publicly to record birds one sees.
