= International Bank =

International Bank may refer to:

- International Bank for Reconstruction and Development, an international financial institution belonging to the World Bank, formed in 1944
- International Bank of Commerce, a bank in Texas, founded in 1966
- International Bank (Liberia), a Liberian bank created in 1960
- International Bank of Azerbaijan, a global financial institution, founded in 1992
- International Bank of Qatar, a private sector bank in Qatar, founded in 1956
- International Bank of Asia, a bank headquartered in Hong Kong
- International Bank of Somalia, Mogadishu-based bank which began operations in 2014

== See also ==
- Awash International Bank, Ethiopian bank, founded in 1994
- Basrah International Bank for Investment, Iraqi commercial bank, founded in 1993
- Cairo International Bank, Ugandan bank, founded in 1995
- Gulf International Bank, Bahraini bank, founded in 1975
- International Westminster Bank, a subsidiary of National Westminster Bank which existed from 1913 to 1989
- Persia International Bank, London-based bank which commenced trading in 2002
- Xiamen International Bank, Chinese joint venture bank, established in 1985
