= Nicholas Best =

British author of Anglo-Irish origin

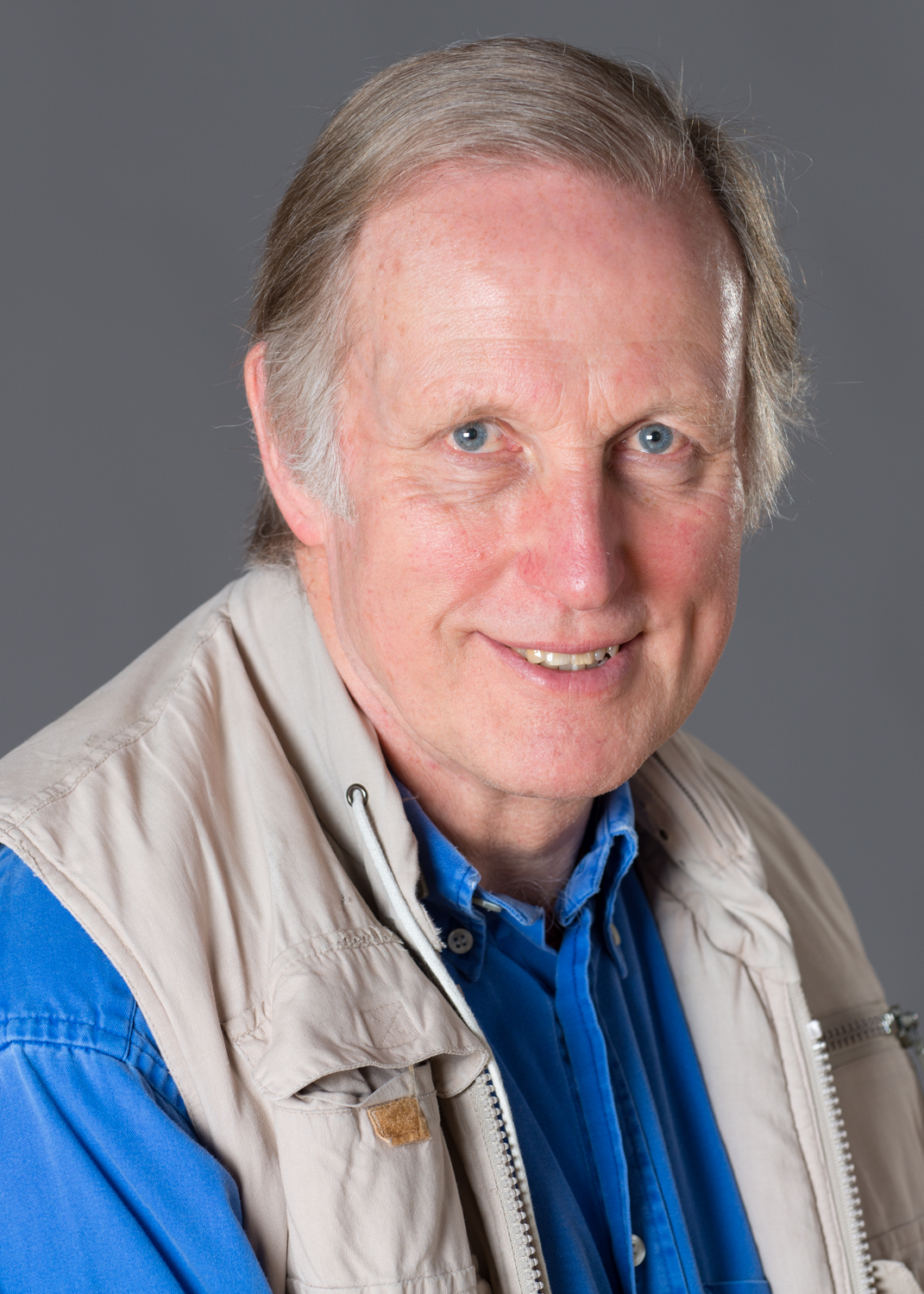

Nicholas Best is a British author of Anglo-Irish origin. He grew up in Kenya and was educated there and in England and at Trinity College, Dublin. He served with the Grenadier Guards in Windsor and Belize and worked in London as a journalist before becoming a full-time author.

His early books include Happy Valley: The Story of the English in Kenya, and Where Were You at Waterloo?, a satirical novel of army life. His second novel, Tennis and the Masai, was later serialised on BBC Radio 4. It told the story of a Kenya prep school similar to Best's own, where the cricket score arrived by carrier pigeon and runaway boys were hunted down with spearmen and tracker dogs.

== Published works ==
- Happy Valley: The Story of the English in Kenya (Secker and Warburg, 1979)
- Where Were You at Waterloo? (R. Hale, 1981)
- Tennis and the Masai (Hutchinson, 1986)
- Medieval Britain (with Andy Williams; Weidenfeld & Nicolson, 1995)
- Celtic Britain (with Andy Williams; Weidenfeld & Nicolson, 1995)
- Historic Britain From the Air (with Jason Hawkes; Vendome Press, 1995)
- The Presidents of the United States of America (Little, Brown and Co., 1995)
- The Kings and Queens of England (Little, Brown and Co., 1995)
- The Knights Templar (Weidenfeld & Nicolson, 1997)
- The Kings and Queens of Scotland (Weidenfeld & Nicolson, 1999)
- London in the Footsteps of the Famous (Bradt Travel Guides, 2002)
- Trafalgar: The Untold Story of the Greatest Sea Battle in History (Weidenfeld & Nicolson, 2005)
- The Greatest Day in History: How the Great War Really Ended (Weidenfeld & Nicolson, 2008)
- Five Days That Shocked the World (St Martin's Press, 2011)
- Point Lenana (Kindle Single, 2014)
- The Hangman's Story (Kindle Single, 2016)
- Seven Days of Infamy (St Martin's Press, 2016)
- Bell Harry (Endeavour, 2019)
