= Frances Osborne =

British writer

The Honourable Frances Osborne
- Born: Frances Victoria Howell
- Education: Windlesham House School; Marlborough College
- Alma mater: University of Oxford
- Spouse: George Osborne (m. 1998; div. 2019)
- Children: 2
- Parents: David Howell, Baron Howell of Guildford (father); Cary Davina Wallace (mother)
- Website: francesosborne.com

Frances Victoria Osborne (née Howell) (born 1969) is an English author. She has written two biographies and one novel.

Osborne's first biography, Lilla's Feast, tells the story of her great-grandmother's life and was published by Doubleday in September 2004. Her second biography, The Bolter, told the story of another of her great-grandmothers Idina Sackville, and became an international best-seller. Park Lane, her third book and first novel, published in June 2012, was named Bookseller's Choice by The Bookseller magazine.

She was the first wife of George Osborne, the former Chancellor of the Exchequer.

== Early life and education ==
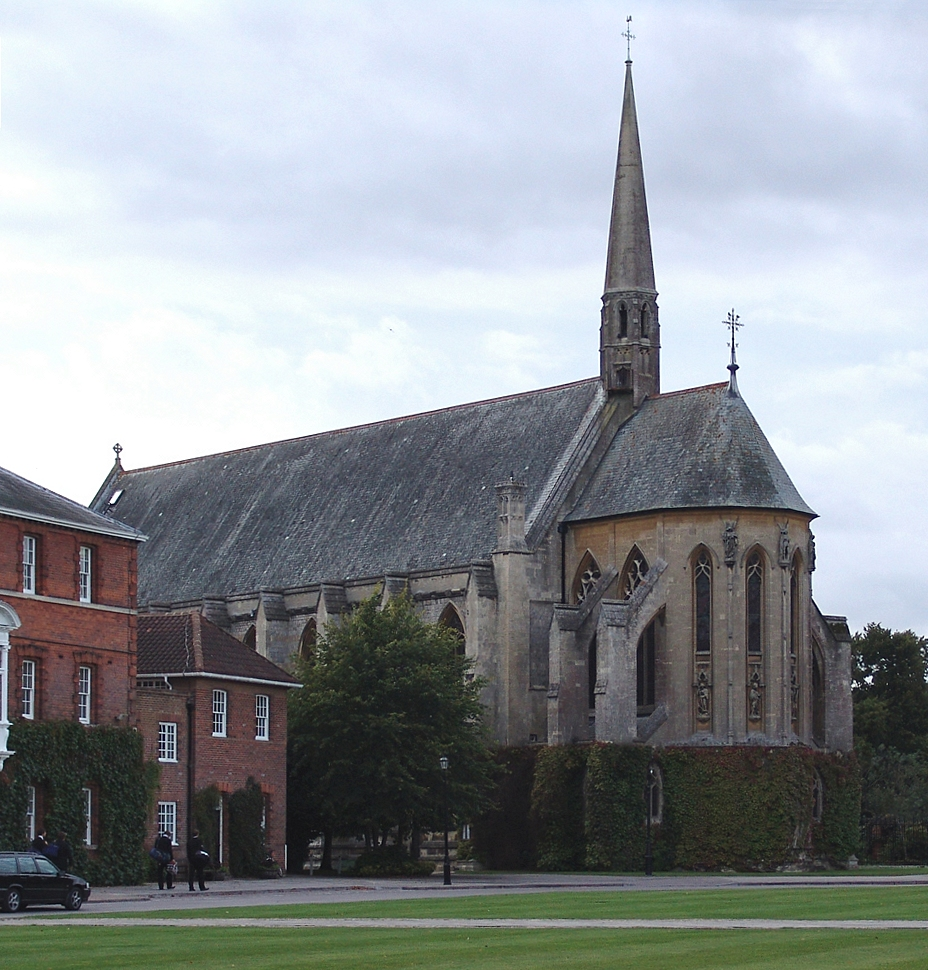
Marlborough College

Osborne was educated at Windlesham House School, Marlborough College and the University of Oxford and then trained as a barrister, during which period she became friends with the future wife of Ed Miliband, Justine Thornton, with whom she later embarked on a backpacking trip across South America.

Osborne worked in law, finance and journalism before becoming a full-time writer.

== Works ==
=== Lilla's Feast ===
Osborne's first biography follows the life of the author's paternal great-grandmother, Lilla Eckford. Lilla Eckford wrote a cookery and housekeeping book when in a Japanese internment camp in World War II. Osborne was fourteen when Lilla died at the age of 100. After the death, Osborne discovered a box full of faded letters that had flown between Lilla, her first husband (Osborne's great-grandfather), his parents and his siblings. Osborne read through the letters, which revealed the story of why Lilla never gave up hope.

Lilla's Feast, published by Doubleday in 2004, has been translated into six different languages, is a Kiriyama Prize Notable Book and a New York Times Editor's Choice.

=== The Bolter ===
The Bolter: Idina Sackville – the woman who scandalised 1920s society and became White Mischief's infamous seductress is a biography of another of Osborne's great-grandmothers, this time a maternal one. Idina Sackville was called a "bolter" as she fled her marriage. There were many bolters in the 1920s but Sackville was the most celebrated of them all in result of her relentless affairs and wild sex parties. She inspired many writers and artists, from Nancy Mitford to Greta Garbo but Idina's compelling charm masked the pain of betrayal and heartbreak.

At the age of 13, Osborne opened a newspaper to discover that Idina Sackville was her mother's grandmother. Osborne used family letters and diaries including those of Idina's first husband (Osborne's great-grandfather) and the shared son of him and Idina (Osborne's grandfather). She abandoned him for the first 19 years of his life.

The Bolter was published in the U.K. by Virago Press dated 2008 and in the U.S. by Knopf in June 2009 and in trade paperback by Vintage Books in May 2010. It was San Francisco Chronicle's Best Book of the Year and an O: The Oprah Magazine No. 1 Terrific Read.

=== Park Lane ===
Park Lane is Osborne's first novel, though she used her own ancestry as inspiration. It is set in a mansion on London's Park Lane in 1914. Downstairs is housemaid Grace Campbell pretending to her family she is working in a well-paid office job. Upstairs is disillusioned debutante Beatrice Masters. Beatrice secretly joins a group of radical militant suffragettes and begins a relationship with a man who would be forbidden from even entering Beatrice's house. Grace and Beatrice both will discover how their life decisions will affect their futures amid the rapidly changing world of World War I, which brings down the barriers that separate the two women.

Park Lane was published by Vintage Books in June 2012, and was rated a top ten read of 2012 by Easy Living along with being Red Magazine's Book of the Month and a Bookseller's Choice in the UK.

== Personal life ==
Frances married the future Chancellor of the Exchequer, George Osborne on 4 April 1998. The Osbornes have two children. In February 2019, they purchased a £3 million chalet in the Swiss Alps resort of Verbier. Shortly afterwards, on 1 July 2019, they announced that they were to divorce.
