= Frédéric de Janzé =

French sportsman and writer (1896–1933)

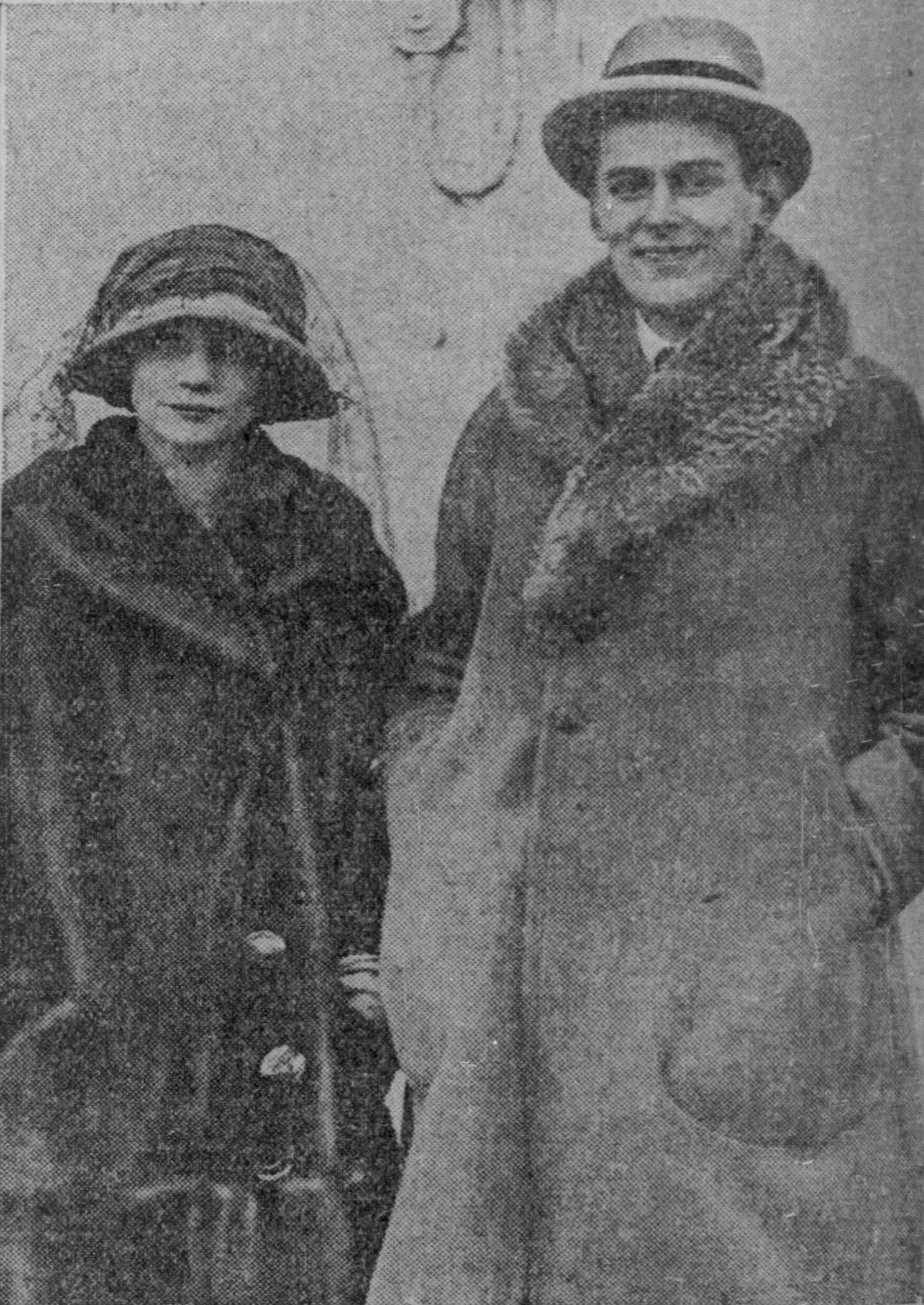
Count de Janzé (right) and Countess Alice de Janzé circa 1927

Frédéric de Janzé, Comte de Janzé (February 28, 1896 − December 24, 1933) was a French sportsman and writer. His father was Vicomte Léon Frédéric de Janzé and his mother was Moya Hennessy, daughter of the landscape painter William John Hennessy. He attended Cambridge University, and during World War I served in the French Air Force. His first wife was Alice Silverthorne, great-niece of Philip Danforth Armour, whom he met in Paris in May 1921 and married in Chicago in September of that year. They were divorced in June 1927, and in January 1930 he married Genevieve Ryan (née Willinger), widow of Washington financier Thomas Jefferson Ryan. His two children were from the first marriage. He was well known as a big game hunter in Kenya and wrote books on French Morocco. His first wife, Alice, was part of the Happy Valley set in Kenya, and had an affair with Raymond de Trafford in 1926 that led to her shooting and wounding de Trafford and herself in early 1927, not long before she and Frédéric divorced.

== Notes ==
- Spicer, Paul (2010). The Temptress: The scandalous life of Alice, Countess de Janzé. London: Simon & Schuster. ISBN 978-1-84737-782-1.
