= Josslyn Hay, 22nd Earl of Erroll =

British peer

Josslyn Hay
- 22nd Earl of Erroll
- Lord Erroll in 1941
- Tenure: 1928 – 1941
- Predecessor: Victor Hay, 21st Earl of Erroll
- Successor: Diana Hay, 23rd Countess of Erroll
- Other titles: Baron Kilmarnock
- Known for: Fascist sympathizer; murder victim
- Born: 11 May 1901; Mayfair, London, England
- Died: 24 January 1941 (aged 39); Ngong, British Kenya
- Cause of death: Gunshot wound
- Residence: Nairobi, Kenya
- Spouses: Lady Idina Sackville (m. 1923; div. 1930) Edith Maude Ramsay-Hill (m. 1930; died 1939)
- Issue: Diana Hay, 23rd Countess of Erroll
- Father: Victor Hay, 21st Earl of Erroll
- Mother: Lucy Mackenzie
- Occupation: Landowner

Josslyn Victor Hay, 22nd Earl of Erroll (11 May 1901 – 24 January 1941) was a British peer and a member of the British Union of Fascists, known for the unsolved case surrounding his murder and the sensation it caused during wartime in Britain.

== Early life ==
Hay was the eldest son of the diplomat Victor Hay, Lord Kilmarnock (later Earl of Erroll) and his wife Lucy, the only daughter of Sir Allan Mackenzie, 2nd Baronet. In 1911, he attended the coronation of George V and carried his grandfather's coronet. He began at Eton College in 1914 but was dismissed two years later.

Although possessing one of Scotland's most distinguished titles, the earls, by this time, had no wealth, and had to develop careers to earn their living. In 1920, Hay was appointed honorary attaché at Berlin under his father, who was earlier appointed chargé d'affaires there before the arrival of Edgar Vincent, 1st Viscount D'Abernon. His father was soon appointed High Commissioner to the Rhineland, but Hay stayed in Berlin and served under Lord D'Abernon until 1922.

After passing the Foreign Office examinations, Hay was expected to follow his father into diplomacy but instead became infatuated with Lady Idina Sackville, a daughter of Gilbert Sackville, 8th Earl De La Warr, the divorced wife of the politician Euan Wallace and the wife of Charles Gordon. Lady Idina soon divorced her second husband in 1923 and she and Hay were married on 22 September 1923.

== Kenya ==
After causing a society scandal due to their marriage – she was twice-divorced, notoriously unconventional in many ways, and eight years his senior – Hay and his wife moved to Kenya in 1924, financing the move with Idina's money. Their home was a bungalow on the slopes of the Aberdare Range which they called Slains, after the former Hay family seat of Slains Castle which was sold by Hay's grandfather, the 20th Earl, in 1916. The bungalow was sited alongside the high-altitude farms which other white Kenyans were establishing at the time.

The Happy Valley set were a group of elite, colonial expatriates who became notorious for drug use, drinking, adultery and promiscuity, among other things. Hay soon became a part of this group and accumulated debts. Hay had inherited his father's titles in 1928 and his wife divorced him in 1930 because he was cheating her financially. Hay then married the divorced Edith Maude ("Molly") Ramsay-Hill on 8 February 1930. They lived in Oserian, a Moroccan-style house on the shores of Lake Naivasha, and his new wife became involved with the hedonistic lifestyle of Happy Valley.

On a visit to England in 1934, Lord Erroll joined Oswald Mosley's British Union of Fascists and on his return to Kenya a year later, became president of the Convention of Associations. He attended the coronation of George VI and Elizabeth in 1937 and was elected to the legislative council as the member for Kiambu in 1939. On the outbreak of World War II that year, Lord Erroll became a captain in the Kenya Regiment and accepted the post of Military Secretary for East Africa in 1940.

On 13 October 1939, Lady Erroll died. In 1940, Lord Erroll met at the Muthaiga Country Club, and subsequently had an affair with, Diana, Lady Broughton, the wife of Sir Jock Delves Broughton, Bt. (and, ultimately, who married after Delves Broughton's death, the 4th Baron Delamere).

== Murder ==
Delves Broughton learned of the affair and after spending a night with Lady Broughton, Lord Erroll was found shot dead in his Buick at a crossroads on the Nairobi-Ngong road on 24 January 1941. Sir Jock was accused of the murder, arrested on 10 March and stood trial from 26 May. There were no eyewitnesses to the killing; the evidence against him proffered in court was weak; and his barber was also foreman of the jury. Sir Jock was acquitted on 1 July. He died by suicide in England a year later.

Numerous books, dramatisations (see below), and articles have been written on the murder mystery and various theories have been argued; the murder may have been solved by material discovered in 2007 suggesting that Delves Broughton was guilty after all.

Lord Erroll is buried in the graveyard of St Paul's Anglican Church in Kiambu, Kenya, next to his second wife, Molly. His earldom and lordship of Hay passed to his only child, Diana, by his first wife, while his barony of Kilmarnock passed to his brother, Gilbert, who changed his surname to Boyd in 1941.

== In popular culture ==
- The BBC television drama The Happy Valley, first transmitted on 6 September 1987, told the story of Erroll's murder, as seen through the eyes of the 15-year-old Juanita Carberry, daughter of John Carberry (10th Baron Carbery) to whom Broughton confesses his guilt even before he is arrested.
- The incident inspired James Fox's 1982 investigative book, White Mischief, which was adapted into the 1988 film of the same title by Michael Radford. Erroll was portrayed by the actor Charles Dance.
- The case featured in the documentary Altitude, Alcohol and Adultery, directed by Vanni Ocleppo and first broadcast on BBC1 on 4 June 1993.
- The incident was also adapted into an episode of the series Julian Fellowes Investigates: A Most Mysterious Murder – The Case of the Earl of Erroll in 2005.
- Hay’s murder and the subsequent trial of Sir Jock Delves Broughton, Bt., are referenced in Lucinda Riley’s novel The Sun Sister.
- British author Rhys Bowen used the murder of Erroll as inspiration for the murder committed in her 2019 novel Love and Death Among the Cheetahs.

== Ancestry ==
Ancestors of Josslyn Hay, 22nd Earl of Erroll

16. William Hay, 18th Earl of Erroll (1801 - 1846)
8. William Harry Hay, 19th Earl of Erroll (1823 - 1891)
17. Lady Elizabeth FitzClarence (1801 - 1856)
4. Charles Hay, 20th Earl of Erroll (1852 - 1927)
18. Gen. the Hon. Sir Charles Gore, KH, GCB (1793 – 1869)
9. Eliza Amelia Gore (1829 - 1916)
19. Sarah Rachel Fraser (1824 - 1880)
2. Victor Hay, 21st Earl of Erroll (1876 - 1928)
20. Col. Henry Peisley L'Estrange, of Moystown (1776 - 1824)
10. Edmund L'Estrange (1813 - 1866)
21. Grace Burdett
5. Mary Caroline L'Estrange (1849 - 1934)
22. Frederick Lumley-Savile (1788 - 1837)
11. Harriet Susan Beresford Lumley-Savile (1823 - 1904)
23. Charlotte De la Poer-Beresford ( - 1851)
1. Josslyn Hay, 22nd Earl of Erroll
24. George Mackenzie (1773 - 1852)
12. Sir James Thompson Mackenzie, 1st Baronet, of Glen Muick (1818 – 1890)
25. Margaret Allan ( - 1851)
6. Sir Allan Russell Mackenzie, 2nd Baronet, of Glen Muick (1850 – 1906)
26. Charles Du Pré Russell (1795 - 1878)
13. Mary Russell (1824 - 1912)
27. Mary Anne Raynsford (1793 - 1831)
3. Lucy Mackenzie (1875 - 1957)
28. Henry Davidson, of Tulloch Castle (1771 - 1827)
14. Duncan Davidson, of Tulloch Castle (1800 – 1881), MP
29. Caroline Elizabeth Diffell
7. Lucy Eleanora Davidson (1859 – 1926)
30. John Mackenzie (1803 - 1886) (son of Sir Hector, 4th Bt, of Gairloch)
15. Mary Mackenzie (1827 - 1867)
31. Mary Jane Inglis (1804 - 1897)

== See also ==
- List of unsolved murders (1900–1979)

== Sources ==
- Davenport-Hines, Richard – Hay, Josslyn Victor, twenty-second earl of Erroll (1901–1941), colonist in Kenya and philanderer – Oxford Dictionary of National Biography
- Trzebinski, Errol. The Life and Death of Lord Erroll: The Truth Behind the Happy Valley Murder (Fourth Estate, 2000) ISBN 978-1-8570-2437-1
- Genealogy website

Peerage of Scotland
Preceded by Victor Alexander Sereld Hay	Earl of Erroll; 1928–1941	Succeeded by Diana Denyse Hay
Peerage of the United Kingdom
Preceded by Victor Alexander Sereld Hay	Baron Kilmarnock; 1928–1941	Succeeded by Gilbert Boyd
