= Naivasha =

- Town
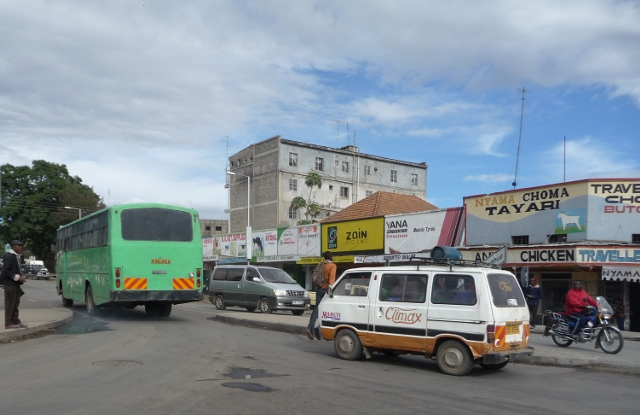

- Location in Kenya
- Coordinates: 0°43′S 36°26′E
- Country: Kenya
- County: Nakuru County
- Elevation: 2,086 m (6,844 ft)

Population (2019)
  - Total: 355,383
- Time zone: UTC+3 (EAT)

Naivasha is a town in Nakuru County, Kenya, 92.8 km (57.7 mi) north west of Nairobi. From 1969, the population expanded by a factor of 17 times to over 355,383 at the 2019 census. It is situated on the shores of Lake Naivasha, from which it takes its name. The name Naivasha derives from the local Maasai word ɛnaɨpɔ́sha, meaning "that which heaves", a common Maasai word for bodies of water larger enough to have wave action when it is windy or stormy. Naivasha arose as the British attempted to pronounce the Maasai name. Literally, Lake Naivasha means "Lake Lake" and Naivasha Town means "Lake Town".

== Location ==
Naivasha lies in a rift valley basin 92.8 km (57.7 mi) by road north west of Nairobi.

== History ==
The Maasai people were the first group to settle on the basin due to their quest for pasture and water for their livestock. This is rumored to have been around the 15th century when they moved down from the present day Sudan. Later in the 16th century, the Bantu people including various tribes started their migration into the basin from the Central African forests. The most populous tribe in Naivasha is the Kikuyu. European settlers are also major settlers in Naivasha. They arrived in the 19th century.

The town is home to the Isahakia community, descendants of Isaaq soldiers and traders that settled in Kenya in the 1900s. In the late 1970s–1980s Lake Naivasha was overrun with poachers and foreign creatures were introduced into the lake to provide fishing. The migratory paths along Lake Naivasha were being destroyed by the local rose industry. The naturalist Joan Root (1936–2006), spent the last decade of her life trying to save the lake and its wildlife.

A resort in Naivasha was the location for much of the negotiations of the Comprehensive Peace Agreement ending the Second Sudanese Civil War, commonly known as the "Naivasha Agreement".

== Demographics ==
The town is home to the Isahakia Community, descendants of Isaaq soldiers and traders that settled in Kenya in the 1900s.

== Population ==
The town has a total population of 355,383 (2019 census).

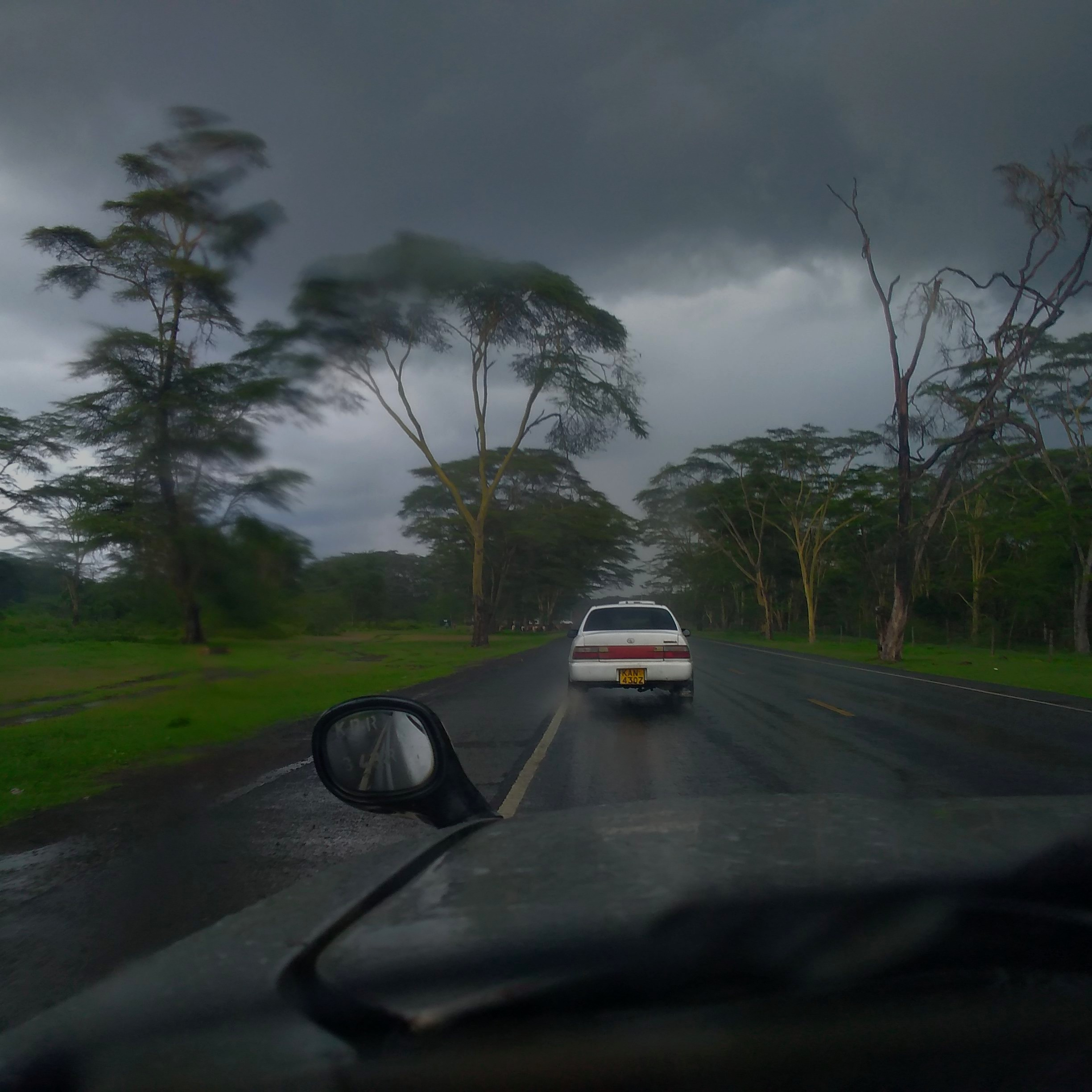
Naivasha-Nakuru road (A104) in the rain

Historical population
Year	Pop.	±%
1969	6,920	—
1979	11,491	+66.1%
1999	32,222	+180.4%
2009	91,898	+185.2%
2019	355,383	+286.7%

== Transport ==
Naivasha is located on the shore of Lake Naivasha along the Nairobi–Nakuru highway (A104 road) and the Uganda Railway. In 2015, an extension of the new standard gauge railway to this town was approved.

The Inland Container Depot was officially opened in 2022 in Naivasha, to handle transport of cargo to the Great Lakes Region, including Rwanda, Uganda, Tanzania and Democratic Republic of Congo.

== Industry ==
The main industry is agriculture, especially floriculture.

Naivasha is also a popular tourist destination. Hell's Gate National Park (the main locations for The Lion King, including Pride Rock and the Gorge, are modelled after the park), Olkaria Geothermal Spa, Mount Longonot National Park and Mount Longonot are nearby attractions. Tours also have included Lake Naivasha, to observe birdlife and hippopotamus behaviour, as well as other wild animals.

It is also home to Sunderland AFC Navaisha - the Kenyan offshoot of the renowned English Championship football team, Sunderland AFC. Their nickname is The Mighty Black Panthers and they rely solely on sponsorship.

== See also ==
- Lake Naivasha Country Club – historic site in the area.
- Chisholm, Hugh, ed. (1911). "Naivasha" . Encyclopædia Britannica. Vol. 19 (11th ed.). Cambridge University Press. p. 156. Describes the region from a white ethnocentric point of view.
