= James Fox (journalist) =

British journalist (born 1945)

- Born: 1945 (age 80–81); Washington D.C., US
- Occupation: Journalist
- Spouse: Bella Freud (m. 2001; sep. 2017)
- Children: 2

James Fox (born 19 November 1945) is a British journalist best known for his book, White Mischief, and for co-authoring Life, the best-selling memoir of Rolling Stones' guitarist Keith Richards.

== Life and career ==
Fox was born in Washington, D.C., U.S. and worked as a journalist in Africa as well as reporting for London's Sunday Times. His first book, White Mischief, is an account of the Happy Valley murder case in Kenya in 1941. He researched the book with Cyril Connolly in 1969 and it was later adapted into a film by Michael Radford in the 1980s. Fox also wrote The Langhorne Sisters, also known as Five Sisters: The Langhornes of Virginia.

He married the fashion designer Bella Freud in 2001. They have a son, James "Jimmy" Lux Fox. The couple separated in 2017.

He has a son, Thomas, from a previous marriage with Valérie Mariane Lalonde (née Lévy)

== Bibliography ==
=== Books ===
- Fox, James (1982). White Mischief. London: Jonathan Cape. ISBN 978-0-224-01731-2.
- Fox, James (1999). The Langhorne Sisters. Granta Books. ISBN 978-1-862-07281-7.; US edition: Five Sisters: The Langhornes of Virginia, Simon & Schuster, 2000. ISBN 978-0-684-80812-3

=== Essays and reporting ===
- Fox, James (December 2012). "The riddle of Kate Moss". Cover story. Vanity Fair. 628.
