= Slains Castle =

Slains Castle may refer to one of two ruined castles in Aberdeenshire, Scotland:

- Old Slains Castle, a 13th-century castle was originally the property of the Comyn Earls of Buchan, near Collieston
- New Slains Castle, a 16th-century tower house, built by the 9th Earl of Erroll, overlooking the North Sea from its cliff-top site 1 kilometre (0.62 mi) east of Cruden Bay

== Ships ==
- Slains Castle, a ship chartered by the New Zealand Company in the 1840s
