= Diana Caldwell =

Leading figure in the murder mystery of Lord Errol in 1941

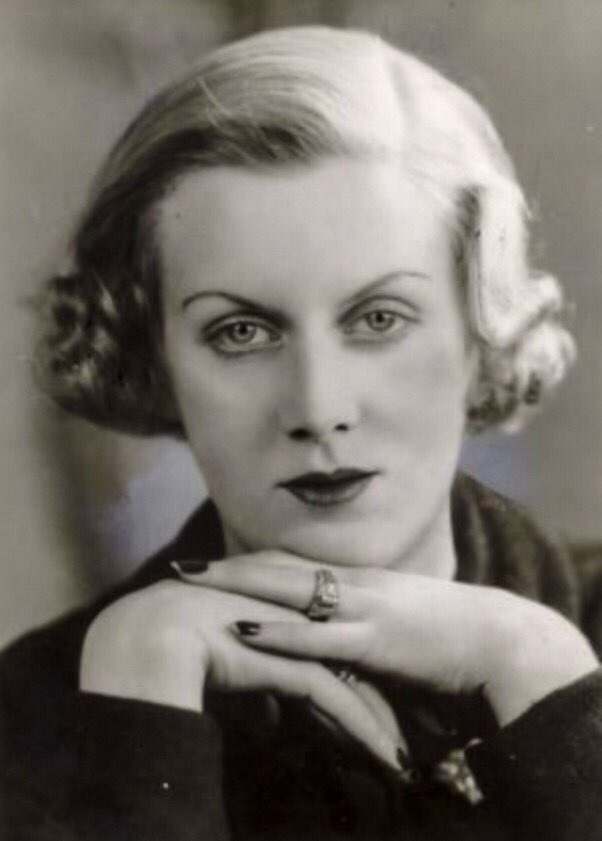
- Photo portrait, circa 1936
- Born: Diana Caldwell; 22 December 1913; Hove, Sussex, England
- Died: 3 September 1987 (aged 73); London, England
- Spouse: Vernon Motion (m. 1937; div. 1937) Sir Jock Delves Broughton (m. 1940; died 1942) Gilbert Colville (m. 1943; div. 1954) Thomas Cholmondeley, 4th Baron Delamere (m. 1959; died 1964)

Diana Caldwell (22 December 1913 – 3 September 1987) was an English society femme fatale figure who first appeared on the London scene between the wars. She is best known for her part in the murder of Lord Erroll in 1941, dramatised in the 1987 film White Mischief played by Greta Scacchi.

== Early life ==
Diana Caldwell was born in Hove in December 1913, the daughter of Major Josiah Seymour Caldwell and Marjorie, née Howell. Caldwell lived with her family in a spacious Victorian townhouse in Hove, attending a private girls' school in the same road until aged eleven, when she moved to a nearby boarding school. Caldwell's mother had been a society beauty in London in her earlier years, prompting her father to move the family to the relative social isolation of Hove. (Note: Caldwell planned to escape her father's controlling influence at the earliest opportunity, potentially inspired by her mother's glamorous reports of London life)

Caldwell arrived on the London scene around 1931 aged eighteen, working as a model for a fashion house in the day time and managing a jazz cocktail bar at night. (Note: The cocktail bar, the Blue Goose located in the heart of affluent Mayfair, was specifically intended for young women (gold diggers) to meet eligible men of wealth and position) According to writer Cyril Connolly:

"[Diana was] one of those creamy ash blondes of the period with a passion for clothes and jewels, both worn to perfection, and for enjoying herself and bringing out enjoyment in others."

The jazz scene and the bar brought Caldwell into contact with the upper classes, whom she entertained in London during the week, and with whom she mixed in large country houses at weekends. Her activities were covered regularly in Tatler magazine, and she had a growing reputation as a fine horsewoman with a passion for piloting aircraft to social hotspots throughout Europe.

== Marriages ==
What Caldwell may have lacked in classic beauty, she more than compensated for in style and boldness, attracting many proposals of marriage. By the time she was twenty-two, Caldwell was to be seen gracing society balls, fashionable weddings and charity events, attending race meetings, participating in hunts or piloting around the capitals of Europe, photographed on the arms of a string of wealthy men. When the world was worrying about German rearmament, Caldwell was coming out. In 1935, she had been photographed frequently in the company of the Austrian Vice Chancellor in Budapest. It has been suggested that Caldwell had been recruited by military intelligence through Hugh Dickinson around this time, although this has yet to be independently verified. It was in 1935 that she first met Sir Jock Delves Broughton, which was to set in motion a fateful sequence of events.

By the end of 1936, Caldwell's father arranged for her to marry John Sidney Tabor. A few months later, the engagement was broken and Caldwell had returned to her glamorous life-style in Budapest.

=== Mrs Vernon Motion ===
One of the country houses frequented by Caldwell was Tingewick Hall in Buckinghamshire, the venue for many jazz parties in the 1930s exclusively for the rich, and is allegedly where Caldwell met Vernon Motion. Motion was a dashing young pianist who shared a passion for flying and lavish living; both believed the other to be substantially wealthy. Caldwell, who was pregnant but not by Motion, married Motion a few days after meeting him at the end of 1937, and divorced him two weeks later when they discovered the truth about each other's circumstances. (Note: Caldwell's marriage to Motion was probably an act of defiance aimed at her father; she divorced Motion on grounds of adultery and aborted her pregnancy)

=== Lady Delves Broughton ===
Caldwell became a house guest at Tingewick Hall under the care of her friend and confidante Betty Loftus (née Winterbottom). A few weeks later, Loftus arranged a series of “chance meetings” with Broughton at her brother's house in Cheshire, and at Cosgrove Hall, Northamptonshire. Broughton was thirty years older than Caldwell but on 24 March 1938 her father, who had taken to drinking excessively, died.

The following year, Broughton began divorce proceedings with his first wife and in 1940, following the marriage dissolution, he left England to marry Caldwell and move to a property he had purchased in Kenya. On a romantic ship-board passage to Africa, Caldwell had managed to secure a pre-nuptial agreement that guaranteed her an estimated annual income of £5000. They were married as soon as the couple docked at Durban on November 5, 1940.

The newlyweds travelled to Nairobi, where Caldwell almost immediately started a public affair with the Earl of Erroll who was at the centre of the Happy Valley set. Broughton appeared to consent to the affair but privately admitted to misgivings about their frequent outings together. Erroll was murdered three months later, which created one of the greatest murder mysteries of the 20th century. Broughton was arrested for his murder but was acquitted shortly after for lack of evidence. Caldwell supported her husband's story but he returned to England in December 1942 and was found dying from a morphine overdose in a Liverpool hotel a few days after his arrival.

=== Mrs Gilbert Colville ===
A month after Broughton died, Caldwell married Gilbert Colville, who was both friendless and the richest landowner in Kenya. They had 12 years of relative happiness together, adopting a daughter when their own son died after a few days. During their marriage, Caldwell, as Colville's wife, became a very powerful figure in Kenya.

Caldwell fell in love with Tom Delamere, however, and the Colvilles were divorced in 1954. Colville remained on good terms with Caldwell thereafter and left her his considerable properties in Kenya when he died in 1966, some of which were sold for an estimated £2.5 million to help cover death duties.

=== Lady Delamere ===
Having been granted a divorce from Colville, Caldwell married Delamere in 1955, living in a ménage à trois through the 1960s and 1970s with her husband and Lady Patricia Fairweather (daughter of the 2nd Earl of Inchcape). By the time of Delamere's death in 1979, Caldwell was arguably the most powerful European woman in Africa, known as the "White Queen of Africa."

== Legacy ==
Caldwell returned to England a few years later to a house in Berkshire and died in London aged 73 in 1987, probably from heart failure. She remains at the centre of the mystery over the murder of Lord Erroll, even as recent testimonials appear to implicate Broughton. Caldwell will probably be remembered as she is portrayed by Greta Scacchi in the film "White Mischief", which was released in the year of her death.
