= Jock Delves Broughton =

British baronet (1883–1942)

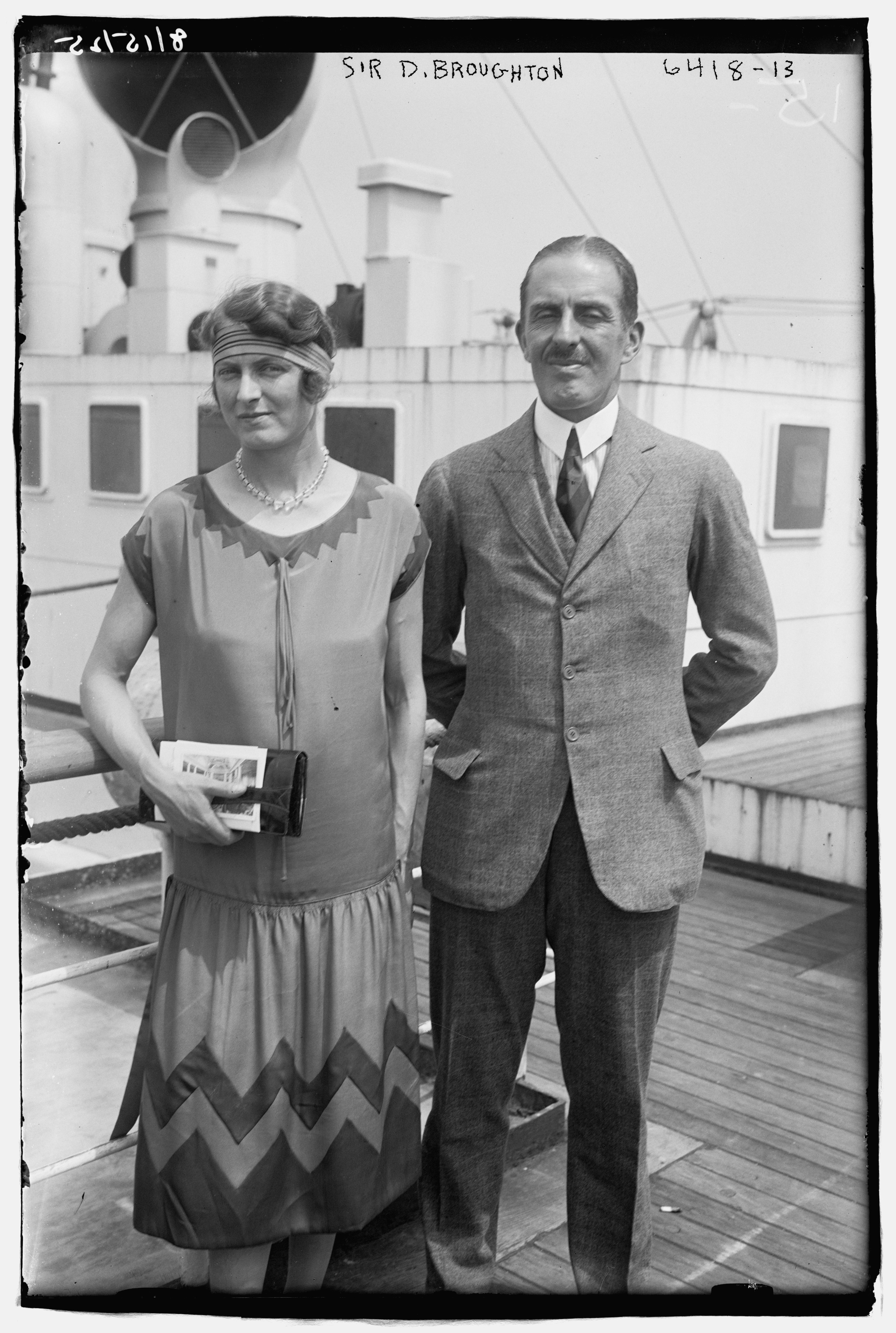
- Sir Jock Delves Broughton and his first wife, 1925
- Born: 10 September 1883; Doddington Hall, Cheshire, England
- Died: 5 December 1942 (aged 59); Adelphi Hotel, Liverpool, England
- Cause of death: Suicide by drug overdose
- Education: Eton College, Royal Military College, Sandhurst
- Known for: Murder trial of Lord Erroll
- Spouses: Vera Edyth Griffith-Boscawen (m. 1913; div. 1939) Diana Caldwell (m. 1940)
- Children: At least two, including Evelyn
- Relatives: Isabella Blow (granddaughter)
- Family: Delves Broughtons
- Military career
- Allegiance: United Kingdom
- Branch: British Army
- Rank: Deputy Lieutenant
- Unit: Irish Guards
- Conflicts: World War I

Sir Henry John Delves Broughton, 11th Baronet, DL (10 September 1883 – 5 December 1942), was a British baronet who is chiefly known for standing trial for the murder of the 22nd Earl of Erroll. The event was the basis of the film White Mischief and of the British television drama The Happy Valley, both from 1987.

== Early life ==
Born at Doddington Hall in Doddington, Cheshire, 'Jock' Delves Broughton attended the Royal Military College, Sandhurst, and was commissioned a second lieutenant in the Irish Guards on 10 December 1902. He came into the baronetcy upon the death of his father in April 1914. He had married Vera Edyth Griffith-Boscawen on 8 July 1913; their daughter, Rosamond, married The 15th Lord Lovat in 1938.

On the outbreak of the First World War, as a captain in the 1st Battalion Irish Guards, he was due to sail with his men, but was taken ill and had to be replaced. He was forced to sell off most of the 34,000 acres (140 km^{2}) of the family estate in the 1930s to pay gambling debts. In the late 1920s and early 1930s, he was part of a consortium which owned the Ensbury Park Race Course in Kinson, Dorset, now a part of Bournemouth. In 1939, he was suspected of insurance fraud after the theft of his wife's pearls and some paintings, on which he claimed the insurance. Months after he and Vera divorced, Delves Broughton married Diana Caldwell in Durban, Natal, Union of South Africa, on 5 November 1940, and the couple moved to the Colony and Protectorate of Kenya.

== Murder trial ==
Lord Erroll was found shot in the head in his car at a crossroads outside Nairobi on 24 January 1941. He and the Delves Broughtons were part of the so-called Happy Valley set living in Happy Valley, Kenya.

Erroll's former lover, Alice de Janzé, was initially viewed by the Happy Valley set as a suspect, but Sir Jock Delves Broughton – whose wife was very publicly carrying-on with Erroll – was arrested. He was acquitted at trial for lack of evidence, a conclusion that hinged on the identification of the murder weapon. Delves Broughton's pistol was a Colt with 6 grooves, and Erroll was killed by a bullet with 5 grooves. No pistol was produced by the Crown or by the defence. Delves Broughton claimed that two of his pistols, a silver cigarette case and 10 or 20 shillings were stolen days before Erroll's death (Superintendent Arthur Poppy, a senior officer in the Kenya Police, claimed that Delves Broughton had stolen the guns from himself to give the impression that he had no .32 pistol at the time).

Additionally, the bullet that killed Erroll was fired by a pistol with clockwise rifling; Colts use anti-clockwise rifling. Another bullet fired at Erroll also had 5 grooves and clockwise turning. On 11 May 2007, The Daily Telegraph writer Christine Nicholls described taped evidence she claimed was definitive proof that Delves Broughton killed Erroll and the writer Juanita Carberry said she had heard his confession to the crime.

== Aftermath ==
Delves Broughton was never accepted back into the Happy Valley set and returned to England alone, his wife having already taken another lover. In December 1942, a few days after his arrival, 59-year-old Delves Broughton was found dying from a morphine overdose at the Adelphi Hotel, Liverpool. The inquest recorded a verdict of suicide while the balance of his mind was disturbed, in relation to illness following a back injury from a fall, the official reason for his return to England. The baronetcy passed to his son, Sir Evelyn Delves Broughton. After his death, his widow Diana remarried twice, the first time to the Happy Valley's wealthiest settler, Gilbert Colvile, and the second time to the 4th Baron Delamere.

== See also ==
- Alice de Janzé

Baronetage of England
Preceded by Delves Louis Broughton	Baronet (of Broughton); 1914–1942	Succeeded by Evelyn Delves Broughton
