= List of Kenyan Asian people =

The following is a list of notable Kenyan Asians, either persons born in or resident in Kenya with ancestry in South Asia or those descended from Kenyan Asians.

== Academia, medicine and science ==
- Ali S. Asani, professor
- Quassim Cassam, professor
- Sut Jhally, professor
- Azim Nanji, professor
- Urjit Patel, economist
- Sir Nilesh Samani, physician
- Malkiat Singh, author and publisher
- Sir Tejinder Virdee, scientist

== Business ==
- Allidina Visram, pioneer and businessman
- Manu Chandaria, businessman
- Francisco D'Souza, CEO
- Navin Engineer, businessman
- Trushar Khetia, CEO of the Tria Group
- Alibhai Mulla Jeevanjee, settler and businessman
- Naushad Merali, businessman
- Pradeep Paunrana, businessman
- Baloobhai Patel, businessman
- Atul Shah, businessman
- Bhimji Depar Shah, businessman
- Vimal Shah, businessman

== Law and politics ==
- Sonia Birdi, politician
- Suella Braverman, British politician
- Abdul Majid Cockar, Chief Justice of Kenya
- Isher Dass, politician
- Shams-ud-Deen, politician
- Manilal Ambalal Desai, politician
- Fitz Remedios Santana de Souza, lawyer
- Mahmud Jamal, Puisne Justice of Canada
- Achhroo Ram Kapila, lawyer
- Chunilal Madan, Chief Justice of Kenya
- Joseph Murumbi, politician
- Pio Gama Pinto, journalist and politician
- Usha Prashar, Baroness Prashar, politician
- Kalpana Rawal, lawyer and judge
- Shakeel Shabbir, politician
- Mohamed Sheikh, Baron Sheikh, businessman
- Makhan Singh, trade unionist
- Sir Mota Singh, barrister and judge
- Rishi Sunak, Prime Minister of the United Kingdom
- Amin Walji, politician

== Music and the Arts ==
- Ruhila Adatia-Sood, journalist
- Liaquat Ahamed, author
- Adeel Akhtar, actor
- Mohamed Amin, photographer
- Kuljit Bhamra, composer
- Samir Bhamra, playwright
- Bali Brahmbhatt, playback singer
- Gurinder Chadha, film director
- Ghalib Shiraz Dhalla, author
- Ravida Din, film producer
- Nitin Ganatra, actor
- Kulvinder Ghir, actor
- Viram Jasani, composer and musician
- Ajaib Kamal, poet
- Shenaaz Nanji, author
- Nadira Naipaul, journalist
- Dev Patel, actor
- Shailja Patel, poet
- Priya Ramrakha, photojournalist
- Deep Roy, actor
- Kiran Shah, actor and stuntman
- Pooja Shah, actress
- Sukhbir Singh, bhangra artist
- Manoj Sood, actor
- Bahadur Tejani, poet
- Moyez G. Vassanji, author
- Ali Velshi, journalist
- Zain Verjee, journalist
- Smriti Vidyarthi, journalist
- Imran Yusuf, comedian
- Amber Rose Revah, actress

== Sport ==
- Rajab Ali, cricketer
- Sabir Butt, squash player
- Dipak Chudasama, cricketer
- Basher Hassan, cricketer
- Aasif Karim, cricketer
- Frasat Ali Mughal, cricketer
- Shekhar Mehta, rally driver
- Tanmay Mishra, cricketer
- Hitesh Modi, cricketer
- Khaaliqa Nimji, squash player
- Dipak Patel, cricketer
- Rakep Patel, cricketer
- Mehmood Quraishy, cricketer
- Zahid Sadiq, cricketer
- Jawahir Shah, cricketer
- Ravindu Shah, cricketer
- Reg Sharma, cricketer
- Mohammad Sheikh, cricketer
- Gurdeep Singh, cricketer
- Joginder Singh, rally driver
- Narendra Thakker, cricketer
- Qasim Umar, cricketer
- Hiren Varaiya, cricketer
- Roger Verdi, footballer
- Shehzana Anwar, archer
- Pushkar Sharma, cricketer.

== Other ==
- Ameer Faisal Alavi, army officer
- Bali Mauladad, Big-game hunter
- Niira Radia, corporate lobbyist
- Girdhari Lal Vidyarthi, journalist
- Sanjay Shah, man who lived in Nairobi Airport for 437 days after being refused an English passport
- Aly Kassam-Remtulla, academic and writer

== See also ==
- Non-resident Indian and person of Indian origin
- Overseas Pakistani
- Indians in Uganda
- Indians in Tanzania
- Indian diaspora in Southeast Africa
