= Manilal Ambalal Desai =

Indian-born activist and journalist in Kenyan politics during the 1920s

Manilal Ambalal Desai (1878 – 26 July 1926) was an Indian born activist and journalist who played a prominent role in Kenyan politics during the 1920s.

== Early life ==
Desai was born to a family of landowners in Surat, part of the Bombay Presidency of British India. He was educated at the Mission High School and began his career as clerk at a law firm in Bombay.

== Kenya ==
In 1915, he emigrated to Kenya, then known as the East Africa Protectorate, to work as a law clerk with Harrison, Salmon and Cresswell. A keen cigar smoker, upon being told that only Europeans could smoke cigars at his workplace, he resigned from his job and committed to enter politics. He began to work with Indian associations, and was chosen by Alibhai Mulla Jeevanjee to help reinvigorate the East African Indian National Congress. In 1919, he started the East African Chronicle, a popular critique of the colonial government.

Desai became close friends with Harry Thuku, founder of the Young Kikuyu Association, allowing him to share his office and print his broadsheet Tangazo on the Chronicle's printing press. When Thuku was arrested, Desai took care of Thuku's elderly mother. Desai's friendship with Thuku resulted in him increasingly voicing his support of African grievances in the Chronicle.

He became a member of the Nairobi Town Council and rose to become president of the Nairobi Indian Association. In 1922, he was elected president of the East African Indian National Congress. The following year, together with Jeevanjee, he represented the Indian community in a delegation to London for an audience with the Duke of Devonshire. The meeting resulted in the Devonshire White Paper, which whilst failed to meet Indian demands, also rejected the European settlers demands for dominion status in favour of African Paramountcy. In 1924, Desai spent six weeks in prison for participating in a campaign to boycott participation in a poll tax. The following year, he was nominated to the Legislative Council.

== Death ==
Whilst on an official tour to Tanganyika to raise funds, he suffered a heart attack and died on 26 July 1926.

== Legacy ==
The Desai Memorial Hall in Nairobi was constructed in his memory, however has since been demolished
