= Jeevanjee Gardens =

Park in Kenya

Coordinates: 1.281014°S 36.819476°E

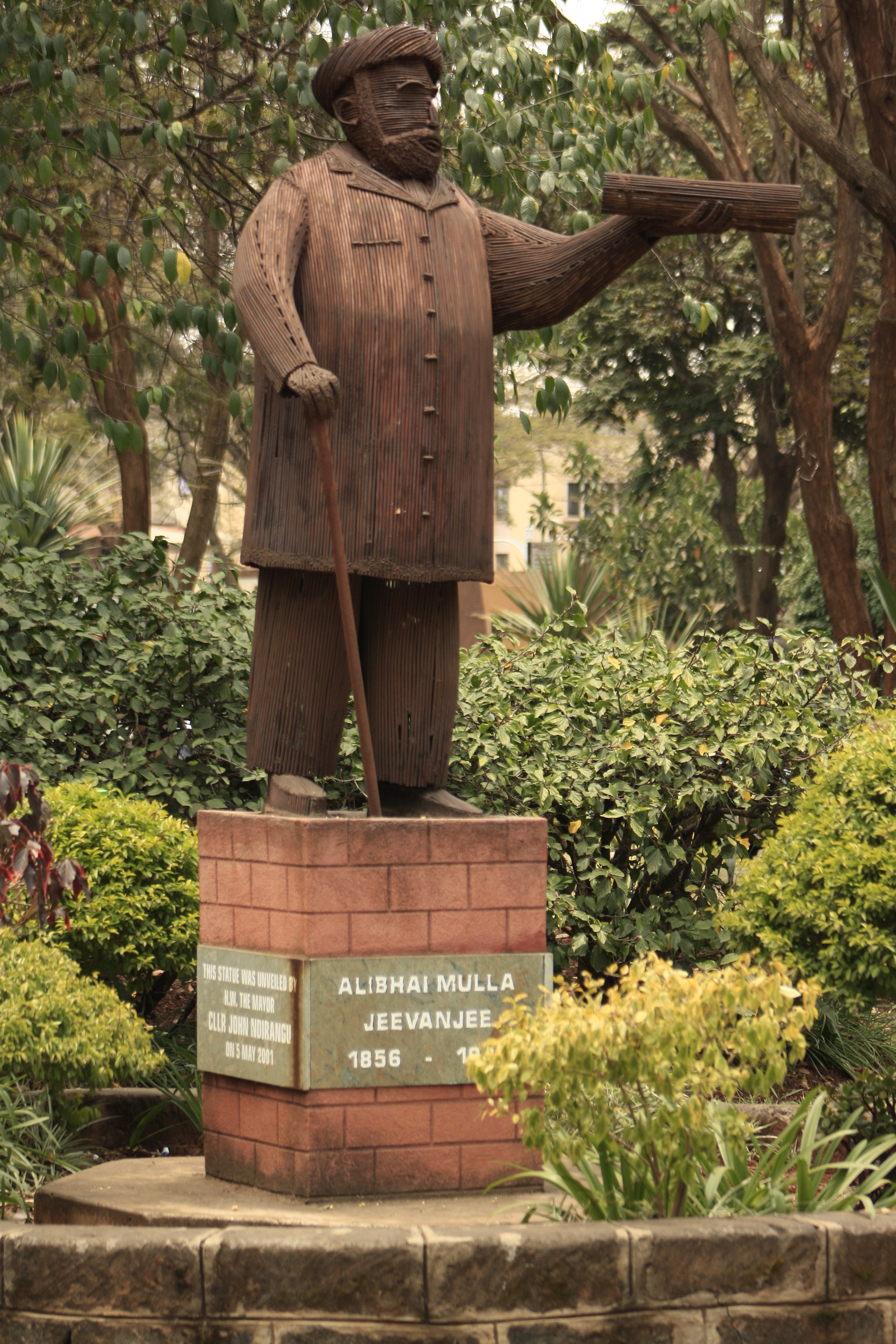
Jeevanjee Monument

Jeevanjee Gardens is an open garden in the Central Business District of Nairobi, Kenya.

Jeevanjee Gardens was founded by A.M. Jeevanjee, an Asian-born entrepreneur in Kenya. It is the only park in the city that is directly owned by the people, having been donated to the magnificent people of Nairobi as a resting area (the park was private property and it is held in trust for the people of Nairobi).

== See also ==
- Alibhai Mulla Jeevanjee
