= Priya Ramrakha =

Priya Vrat Ramrakha Shandas

Personal details
- Born: January 31, 1935 Nairobi, Kenya
- Died: October 2, 1968 (aged 33) Owerri, Biafra, Nigeria
- Cause of death: Firearm (armed conflict)

Priya Ramrakha (january 31, 1935 – october 2, 1968) was an Indo-Kenyan photojournalist.

== Career ==
Ramrakha was one of the first Africans to have been given a contract by Life and Time magazines. After his education at the Art Center College of Los Angeles (arranged by Eliot Elisofon), Ramrakha began work at Life. In 1963, Ramrakha returned to Africa to cover the independence movement in his native Kenya, as one of East Africa's first Indigenous photojournalists. Ramrakha then went on to cover political and military movements across Africa.

== Death and Tributes ==
In 1968, while covering the Nigerian Civil War with CBS correspondent Morley Safer, Ramrakha was fatally wounded in an ambush near Owerri in Imo state by Biafran soldiers. A week later, Life magazine dedicated an article to Ramrakha (Vol. 65, n°15, october 11th, page 46).

The documentary film African Lens: The Story of Priya Ramrakha was released in 2007.

In 2019, a Kickstarter project funded the production and printing of a photobook dedicated to Ramrakha's life and work.
