= Sonia Birdi =

Kenyan politician

Member of the Kenyan Parliament
- Incumbent
- Assumed office 15 March 2013
- Constituency: Nominated MP

Personal details
- Born: Nairobi, Kenya
- Party: URP
- Profession: Politician, journalist
- Committees: Parliamentary committee on Environment and Natural Resources
- Website: www.soniabirdi.com

Sunjeev 'Sonia' Kaur Birdi is a nominated member of the Kenyan Parliament. She was the first Kenyan Asian woman to serve in the national legislature.

== Early life and education ==
Sonia Birdi was born in Nairobi to a Sikh family of Punjabi heritage, the daughter of Surinder and Kuljiridei Birdi. She attended a convent school, and a college in India for her undergraduate degree. She earned a master's degree in business administration from Sheffield University in the United Kingdom.

From 1998 to 2005 she worked as a journalist reporting for Radio Africa's East FM.

== Political career ==
Birdi entered politics as a response to the suffering she saw while doing relief work in the aftermath of the Sinai oil fire at Mukuru kwa Njenga in 2011.

Birdi has taken part in various activities in her capacity as a member of parliament. She was at the Women In Parliament Global Forum in Brussels, taking part in the African Women's Communication and Development Network (FEMNET) walk for the Bring Back Our Girls campaign following the Nigerian schoolgirls' kidnapping by Boko Haram.

She also attended the inauguration of Indian Prime Minister Narendra Modi, and had the opportunity to discuss Kenya–India relations with the BJP.

Birdi sponsored a motion in Parliament, for the government to build dams countrywide for conservation of the environment and ecosystem management in order to reduce environmental degradation. She has also spoken on road safety measures, urging the Transport Safety Authority to take stricter measures on public transport safety. In 2016 she advocated for clearing Kenya's backlog of immigration applications, saying "Failure to issue applicants with citizenship has violated their rights, equality and freedom from discrimination."

In 2015, she and fellow MP Alfred Keter were charged with creating a public disturbance and abusing their power, after an incident at the Gilgil weighbridge, involving a truck belonging to her father's company. The two said that they were confronting corrupt officials at the weighbridge.
