= Allidina Visram =

Allidina Visram (1851 – 30 June 1916) was an Indian settler, merchant, and philanthropist who played a prominent role in the development of British East Africa.

== Biography ==
Visram was born in Kera, Kutch, in the Bombay Presidency of British India in 1851. He migrated penniless to Zanzibar at the age of 12, and found work with a prominent local trader, Sewa Haji Paroo, one of the caravan trade's most active financiers. He soon branched out and began organising his own caravans into the interior. He achieved significant commercial success after entering the ivory trade and coming up with an idea to provide packaged foods to hunters on expedition. During the construction of the Uganda railway, he opened many stores along the track and became the sole supplier of food to the Indian workers along the line. He won the trust of their British engineers, and was awarded a contract to pay the Indian workers and at the same time provide funds to the British constructors. On the death Sewa Hajji Paroo in 1897 he extended the caravan trade to Uganda and became known as the King of Ivory.

By 1904 he branched into agriculture and soon became the owner of seven large plantations. A report by the chief secretary in Entebbe, noted that through his businesses he helped local industries by buying native crops, which no one else would touch, at prices which meant a loss for himself. His actions are regarded as having helped stimulate greater local production across parts of East Africa and contributed to the transition from a barter to money-based economy. By 1909 he was estimated to have 17 agents operating in the Belgian Congo and had diversified into soda making factories and furniture making shops in Kampala and Entebbe, oil mills at Kisumu and the coast, a soap making factory in Mombasa, two cotton ginning establishments in Mombasa and Entebbe and saw mills near Nyeri. In addition he was engaged in the transportation business, operating carts overland, and boats and a steamer at Lake Victoria.

In 1900 he supported the creation of the Mombasa Indian Association and in 1914 was a founding member of the East African Indian National Congress. He died in Mombasa in June 1916 from a fever contracted whilst on a business trip in the Congo. At the time of his death he had over 240 shops in East Africa and Congo. He was also widely known for his philanthropy and contributed large sums to schools and hospitals across East Africa, including a mosque in Kampala and an Anglican cathedral. His success was seen as an inspiration for many of his fellow countrymen from Kutch to emigrate to East Africa in search of a better life.

== See also ==
- Kenyan Asians
