= Bagamoyo Arts and Cultural Institute =

Tanzanian cultural institute

- Abbreviation: TaSUBa
- Predecessor: Bagamoyo College of Arts
- Formation: 2007
- Type: Governmental organisation
- Headquarters: Bagamoyo
- Region served: Tanzania
- Official languages: English and Kiswahili
- Principal: Dr. Herbert Francis Makoye
- Parent organization: Ministry of Information, Youth, Culture and Sports
- Website: Institute website

The Bagamoyo Arts and Cultural Institute (Taasisi ya Sanaa na Utamaduni Bagamoyo, TaSUBa) is a semi-autonomous governmental organisation in Bagamoyo, Tanzania, for training, research and consultancy services in visual and performing arts and culture. The institute organizes the yearly International Festival of Arts and Culture in Bagamoyo and has been known internationally for its performing arts ensemble The Bagamoyo Players since 1990.

== History and current activities ==
TaSUBa was established by The United Republic of Tanzania in accordance with the Executive Agencies Act No. 30 of 1997 and Government Notice No. 220 of November 2007. The institute replaced the former Bagamoyo College of Arts, established in 1981, in order to better correspond to the changing role of performing arts of Tanzania. Its aims and mission are to "encourage the development of Tanzanian arts and culture, to promote their use as a record of contemporary life and manners, to promote education about film, television and the moving image generally, and their impact on society."

According to the book Art in Eastern Africa, "students from different parts of Tanzania and abroad meet and receive training in various fields and genres of arts. Here the youth study fine arts, modeling, sculpture, braiding, traditional and modern music, modern dances and traditional dances from the tribes of Tanzania. They also learn stage arts and techniques, costumes and fashion design." The institute offers both certificate and diploma courses in various specialisations.

The Bagamoyo Players, composed of experienced members of the institute, are a performing arts ensemble, created in 1990. This group consists of artists who present traditional and modern dance, music, drama, acrobatics and comedy performances at festivals and other events both in Tanzania and abroad. In 1992, the Bagamoyo Players were one of three African groups to accompany the Brazilian songwriter Milton Nascimento on the world music project One World One Voice, where Peter Gabriel and Sting were also involved. Prominent former artists and teachers of the institute were musician Hukwe Zawose, as well as actors and dancers John Mponda and Nkwabi Ng'hangasamala, the father of popular Tanzanian singer Nshoma.

Furthermore, the institute organizes the yearly International Festival of Arts and Culture, which gives opportunity for performances for diverse audiences, for example schoolchildren, and promotes live interactions with other African or international artists.
