= Nunge =

Beach in Tanzania

Coordinates: 06°24′33″S 38°53′51″E

Nunge is the name of a beach strip 2 kilometres north of the East African town Bagamoyo in Tanzania. Nunge's southernmost point is the village Mlingotini.

The Swahili word "nungu" means "globefish" in English and "nunge" means "leper colony".

For centuries the Nunge coast has been a place where salt was extracted from the seawater and traded to African inland areas. It is characterized by coastal mangroves and forests of coconut palms.

In recent years, a couple of seaside resort hotels have been constructed along the Nunge beach.
