= Malkiat Singh =

Indo-Kenyan author

Malkiat Singh (born 1938) is an Indo-Kenyan author and publisher of textbooks for schools in Kenya.

== Biography ==
Singh was born in Burj village, Punjab, British India. He read English and Political Science at the Panjab University and graduated in 1958. That same year he married and migrated to Kenya with his Kenyan wife, Mohinder Kaur. He began his career as a teacher at Eastleigh High School and later Nairobi Technical High School. He began writing textbooks in the late sixties, and in 1975 he quit teaching to focus on writing full-time.

Since the introduction of the 8-4-4 Curriculum in Kenya he has become the most recognised publisher of textbooks in the country and has published over 100 books. He has over 20 titles approved by the education ministry for use in schools. In 2013 Longhorn Publishers bought the right to publish his books awarding him KSh. 83,000,000/= and royalties.

== See also ==
- Kenyan Asians
