= Alibhai Mulla Jeevanjee =

Kenyan politician and business

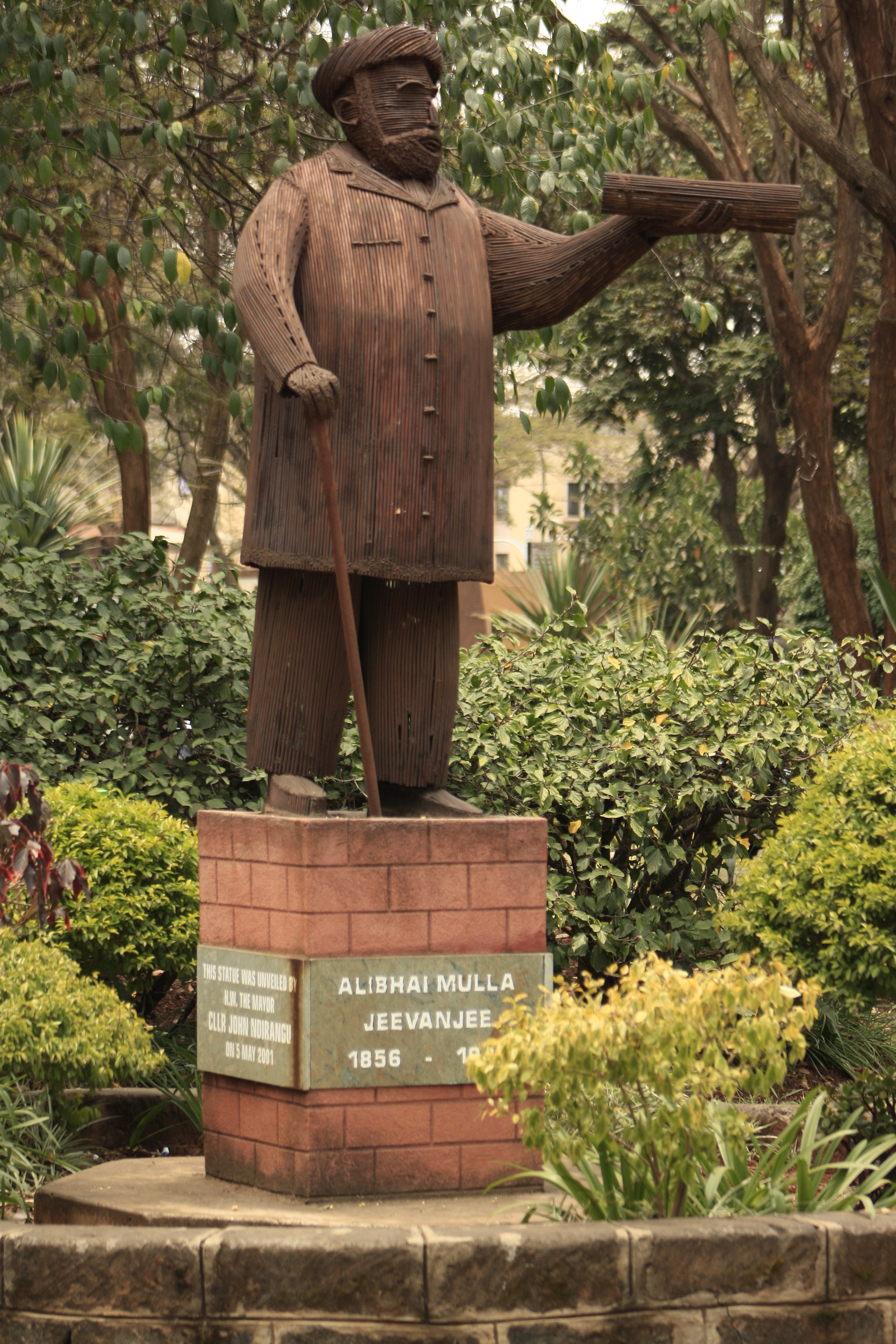
- Alibhai Mulla Jeevanjee monument at the Jeevanjee gardens in Nairobi
- Born: 1856; Karachi, Bombay Presidency, British India
- Died: 2 May 1936 (aged 79–80); Nairobi, Kenya Colony
- Other name: A.M. Jeevanjee
- Occupations: Merchant, politician

Alibhai Mulla Jeevanjee (1856– 2 May 1936) was an Indian-born Kenyan merchant, politician and philanthropist. He was amongst the first and most influential Indian settlers in Kenya, amassing significant wealth and becoming a leader of Kenya's Indian community.

== Early life ==
Jeevanjee was born in Karachi, then part of the Bombay Presidency in British India present day Pakistan, to Shia Dawoodi Bohra parents. He has also been incorrectly referred to as a Parsi in several contemporary sources.

His father Moosajee Mulla Jeevanjee was a horse and cart driver and he received minimal education. At the age of thirty and upon the death of his father he left home to wander India, embarking on a career as an itinerant peddler. He then moved to eastern Australia where he became fluent in English, set up a company selling Eastern produce, participated in the 1887 Jubilee Exhibition, and met British officials familiar with trade opportunities in East Africa.

Returning to Karachi, he established a company providing stevedoring and translation services to visiting ships. In 1890 he sailed to Mombasa on a dhow to open a branch of his company there, branching out into road building, construction and transport.

== Business ==
In 1895, A.M. Jeevanjee of Karachi — as he was called at the time, was awarded the contract to supply the Imperial British East Africa Company with labour as they built the Uganda Railway. He imported his workforce from the Punjab region of British India. The first group to arrive had a total of 350 men and the number grew for the next six years to reach a total of 31,895. Most of the workforce were Sikhs, Hindus and Muslims who worked as skilled labourers, artisans, bricklayers, carpenters, plumbers, tailors, motor mechanics and electrical fitters.

The construction of the railway proved hugely profitable for Jevanjee and his company in Mombasa. He now established a commercial empire across the Indian Ocean, including two steamships between Mauritius and Bombay and between Bombay and Jeddah. He was lauded in the European press as a "real asset to a young country", who spoke English with "quite a good accent" and whose methods were "approximating more to the European, than the Asiatic type. He soon ventured into other business interests in the region. By 1900 it was estimated he was worth approximately four million pounds sterling. His firm undertook contracts to build various government offices, railway stations and post offices all along the railway. He further played a large role in the growth of Nairobi, supplying much capital to develop the town's infrastructure. It was estimated that at the turn of the century, he was the leading property owner in both Nairobi and Mombasa, owning the greater part of the former and half of the latter.

In 1901 he bought the Indian bazaar in Nairobi, and in 1904 built a permanent market named Jeevanjee market with the aim of developing trade in European produce on a global scale. His plans were thwarted following the outbreak of a plague in 1908, which authorities blamed on unhygienic conditions in his market and resulted in the colonial government restricting lower class Indians and Africans to specific quarters for residence and small time trading. In 1910, European settlers opened a market in Nairobi for the exclusive use of Europeans in order to circumvent and circumscribe Jeevanjee and other Indians within the economic sphere. At the time Indians controlled nearly 85 percent of the colony's trade.

He was also a notable philanthropist, supporting religious institutions, the Bohra mosque and cemetery in Nairobi and several schools in Karachi. In 1906 he gifted Nairobi City Council a marble statue of Queen Victoria which he had commissioned. During the First World War, he offered his services to the government to help alleviate food shortages suffered by Indians in German East Africa and Zanzibar.

== Politics ==
When construction of the Uganda Railway reached Lake Victoria, Jeevanjee began taking an active role in political life, and launched the African Standard which was a weekly newspaper. He had hired an editor-reporter, W.H. Tiller whose work was to oversee the operations of the newspaper. In 1905, he sold the newspaper to two British businessmen, Anderson and Mayer, who renamed it the East African Standard. Later in 1910 the paper became a daily newspaper and it moved its headquarters to Nairobi which was a fast developing commercial center.

Jeevanjee co-founded the Mombasa Indian Association in response to the European settlers' Convention on Associations and began to mobilise the Indian community in the struggle for equal rights. Disappointed by the lack of progress he returned to India but in 1910 returned to take up a seat as a member of the Legislative Council. He was the first non-European appointed to represent the interests of Indians in the Legislative Council. In September 1910 he visited London and gave an interview to the Daily Chronicle criticising attempts by European settlers to exclude Indians from a share in the country's commerce. Stating his pride in being a citizen of the British Empire, he proclaimed that if Indian enterprise was allowed to operate freely, Kenya would become a second India, and a source of great strength to the Empire. By positioning himself as pro-imperialist, fighting for Indian equality within the framework of the Empire and reserving his ire for the policies of the white settlers, the majority of whom happened to be Boer rather than British, he was able to attract sympathy amongst the British press.

In 1912, he published an Appeal on behalf of the Indians of East Africa in which he cited the role played by Indians in developing East Africa and issued a call for British East Africa to be annexed by the British Indian Empire and its administration to follow Indian principles. His appeal failed to attract the attention of the Indian National Congress but he did receive support from the Aga Khan, then head of the All India Muslim League and Gopal Krishna Gokhale.

Jeevanjee's increasing political activism began to be detrimental to his business interests and during this period he began losing grip on the empire he had built up.

In 1914 he helped establish the East African Indian National Congress. The aim of the association was to defend Indian interests against European infringements, and demand the right to franchise, removal of restrictions on land sales, and greater Indian representation on legislative and municipal councils.

In 1920, he gave a fiery speech attacking racist settler policies restricting Indian access to the franchise and White Highlands and citing discrimination in taxation, education, municipal services and residential areas. The following year, he mobilised the Indian community of Nairobi to withhold payment of rates for the Municipal Council of Nairobi. He was indicted for non-payment of rates but won the case in the courts on a technicality forcing the legislature to pass a new bill on the collection of municipal rates. In 1923 he took part in the delegation to meet the Duke of Devonshire at the Colonial Office which in turn led to the Devonshire White Paper emphasising African Paramountcy.

By the mid 1920s he had moved away from leadership roles, becoming more a mentor and guide to younger Indian political leaders. In 1926 his protege Manilal Desai died and he returned to the forefront when asked to preside over the sixth session of the East African Indian National Congress to help a rift between radicals and moderates.

In 1933, when Jan Smuts visited Kenya, he visited Jeevanjee to renew an old friendship.

== Death ==
Jeevanjee died of a heart attack on 2 May 1936, in Nairobi, at the age of eighty. He was survived by his wife and two sons. At the time of his death he was a bankrupt, having lost his vast fortune by gambling in produce. One newspaper described him as the "Grand Old Man of Kenya", whilst another stated he was the "first man to demand equality and that "he laid the foundations of an organised political movement in Kenya". He was buried according to Islamic ritual on the day he died at the Bohra Cemetery in Nairobi.

== Jeevanjee Gardens ==
In 1906, whilst at the height of his wealth, Jeevanjee began construction of gardens which were to be known as Jeevanjee Gardens. In 1906 he gifted the gardens to the people of Nairobi to use as a place to relax. These gardens became the subject in the news headlines in 1991 where some leaders in authority were purporting to turn it into a commercial plot. There had been a proposed construction of a Multi-storey car park which was against the wish of Jeevanjee. The youngest remaining daughter of Jeevanjee, the late Shirin Najmudean moved to Nairobi to stop the planned development on the piece of land.

== See also ==
- Jeevanjee Gardens

== Literature ==
- Patel, Zarina Alibhai Mulla Jeevanjee East Africa Publishers Education LTD (2002) ISBN 978-9966-25-111-4
