= Bagamoyo =

Capital of Bagamoyo, Pwani, Tanzania

Bagamoyo Mji wa Bagamoyo (Swahili)
- Capital of Bagamoyo District
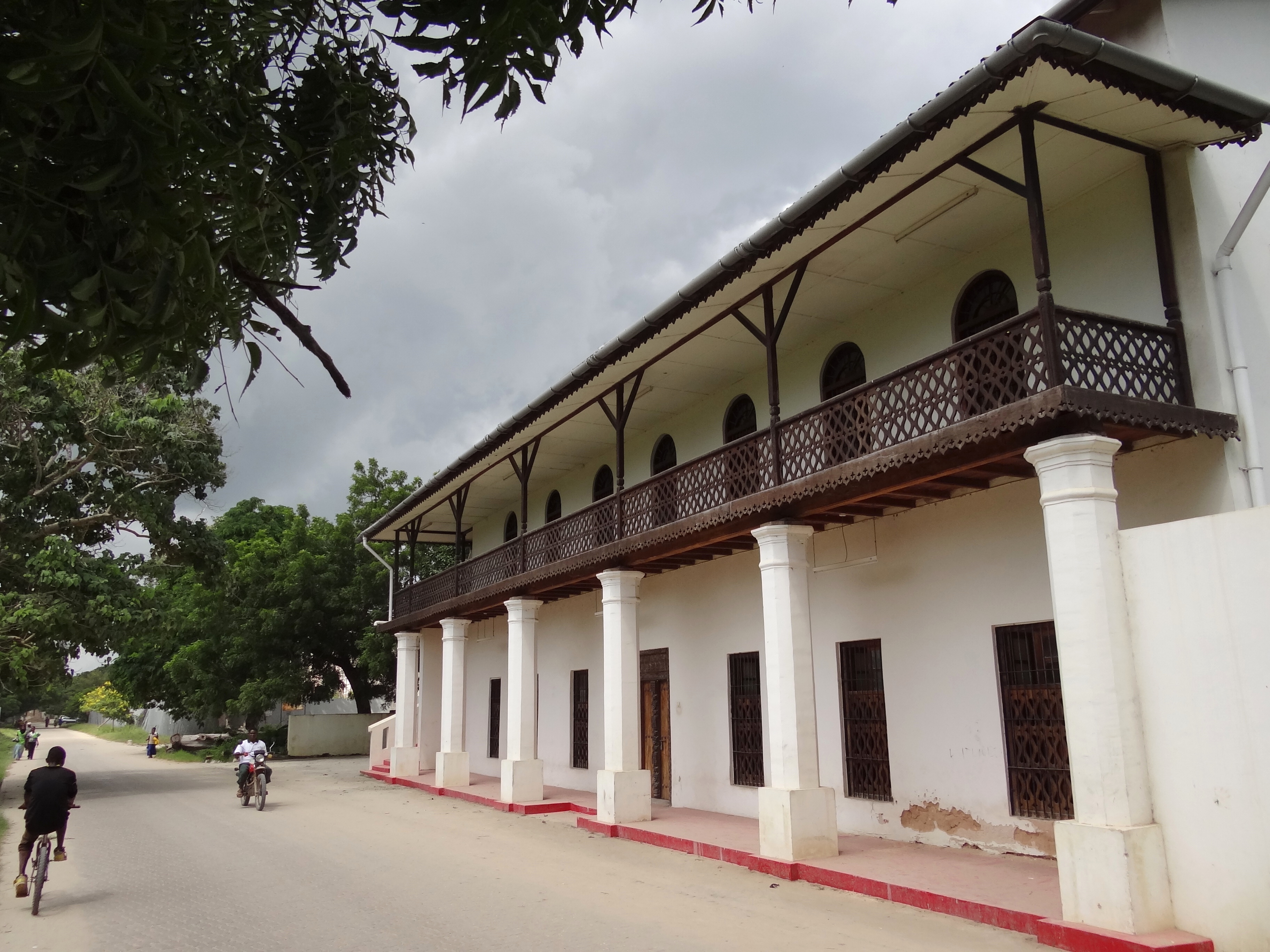
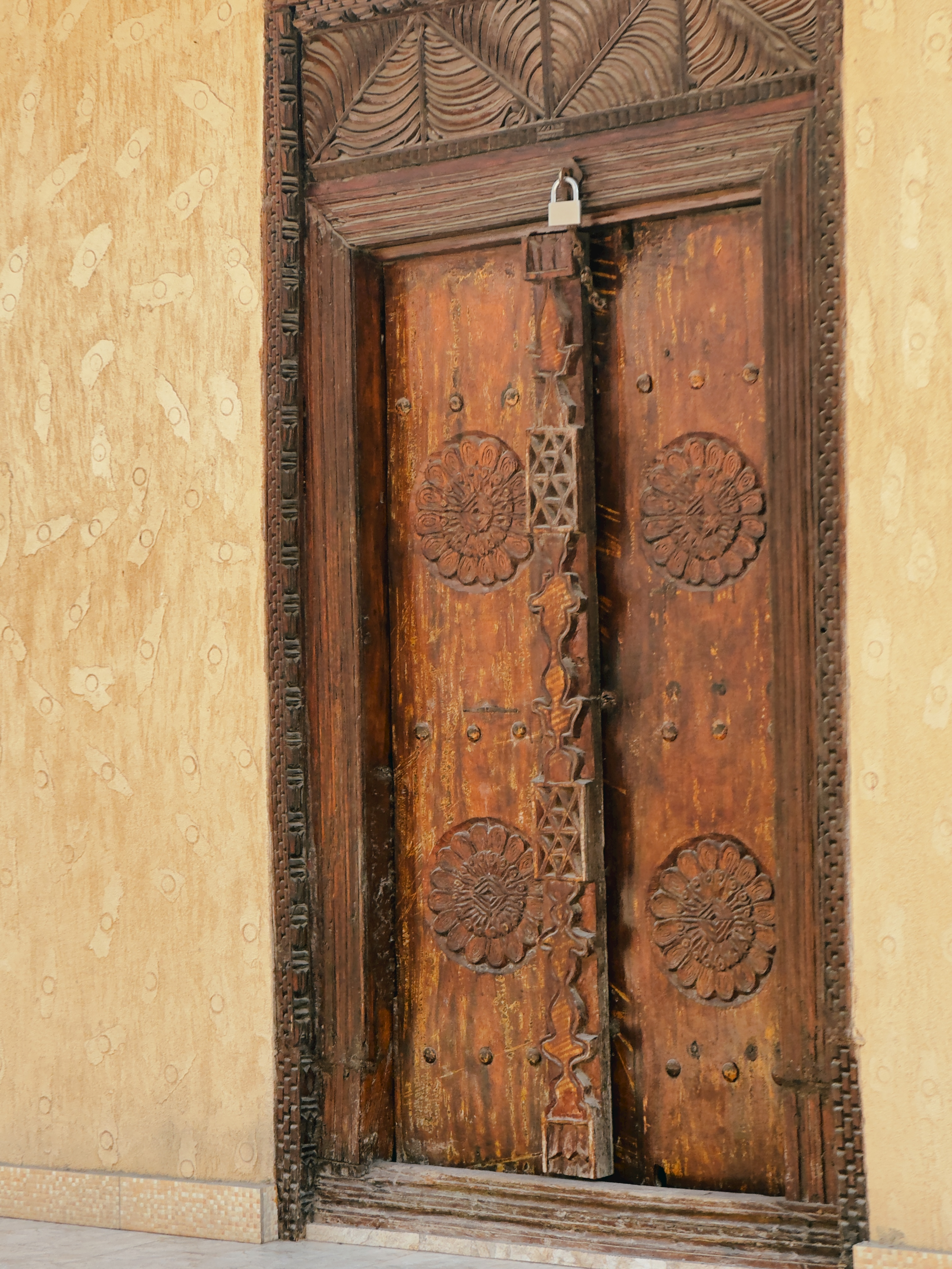
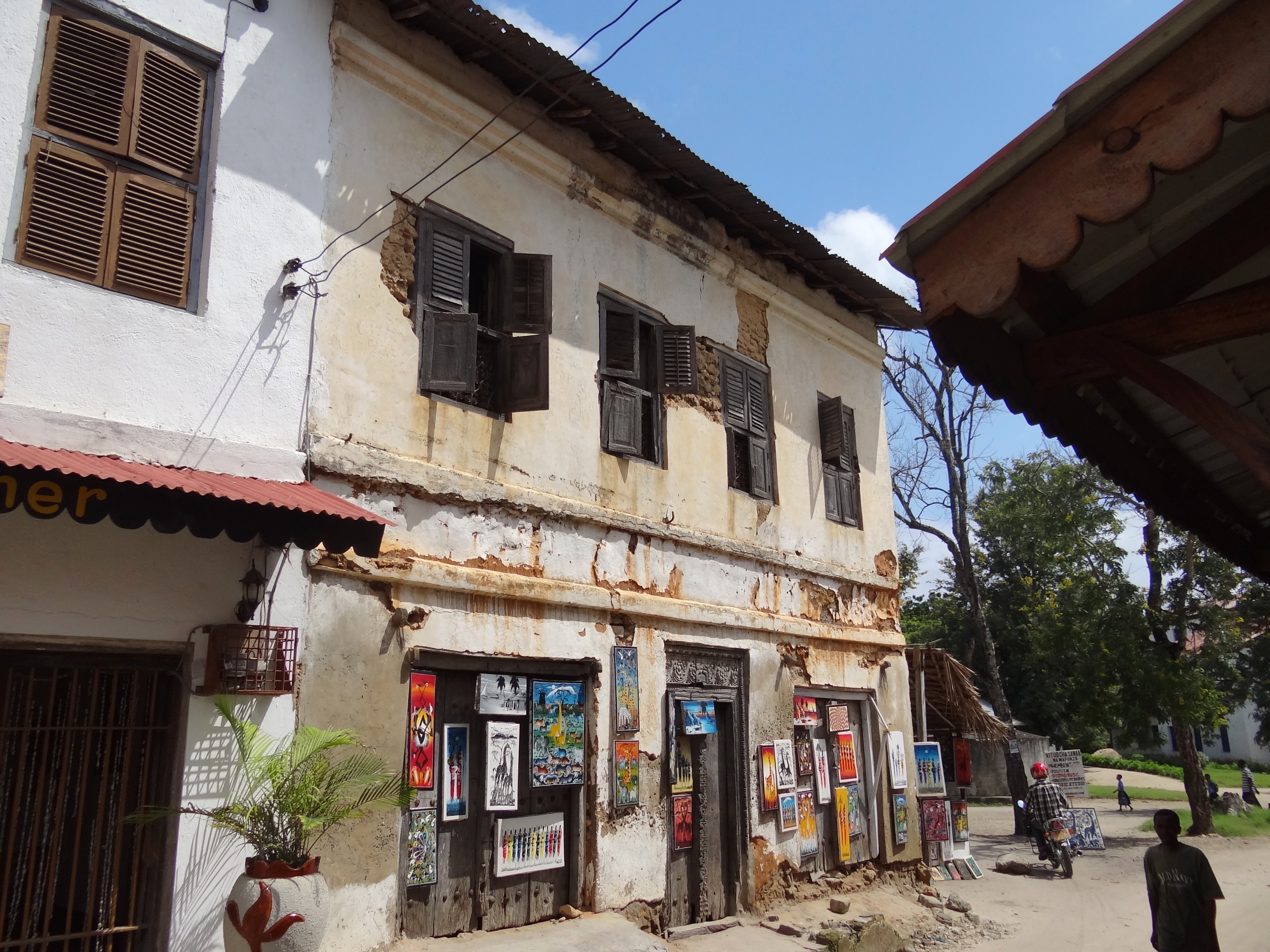
- From top to bottom: Old Arab tea house in Bagamoyo, Swahili door in Bagamoyo and street scene in Bagamoyo
- Nickname: Take a load off your heart
- Location within Tanzania
- Coordinates: 6°26′40″S 38°54′10″E
- Country: Tanzania
- Region: Pwani Region
- District: Bagamoyo District

Population (2011)
  - Total: 82,578

Ethnic groups
  - Settler: Swahili
  - Ancestral: Zaramo

Bagamoyo (Mji wa Bagamoyo, in Swahili) is a historic coastal town and capital of Bagamoyo District in the Pwani Region of Tanzania. Much of the settlement was founded at the end of the 18th century, though it is an extension of a much older (8th century) Swahili settlement, Kaole. It was chosen as the capital of German East Africa by the German colonial administration led by Carl Pteers and it became one of the most important trading ports for the Germans along the East African coast along the west of the Indian Ocean in the late 19th and early 20th century. Bagamoyo lies 75 kilometres (47 miles) north of Dar-es-Salaam on the coast of the Zanzibar Channel, across from the island of Zanzibar. The town hosts Bagamoyo Historic Town, that is a National Historic Site of Tanzania. In 2011, the town had 82,578 inhabitants.

== Etymology ==
In Kiswahili, Bagamoyo's name translates to "take a load off your heart." Your load is supposed to be lifted by the words in order to help you feel at peace. This is a reference to Bagamoyo's renown as a town of porters in the nineteenth century. The mediaeval settlement served as the destination for thousands of porters who travelled with the caravan and carried, on average, 70-pound loads across their shoulders, principally ivory tusks. After a taxing journey and months of hiking over dangerous terrain, Bagamoyo appealed as a destination for recreation and rest.

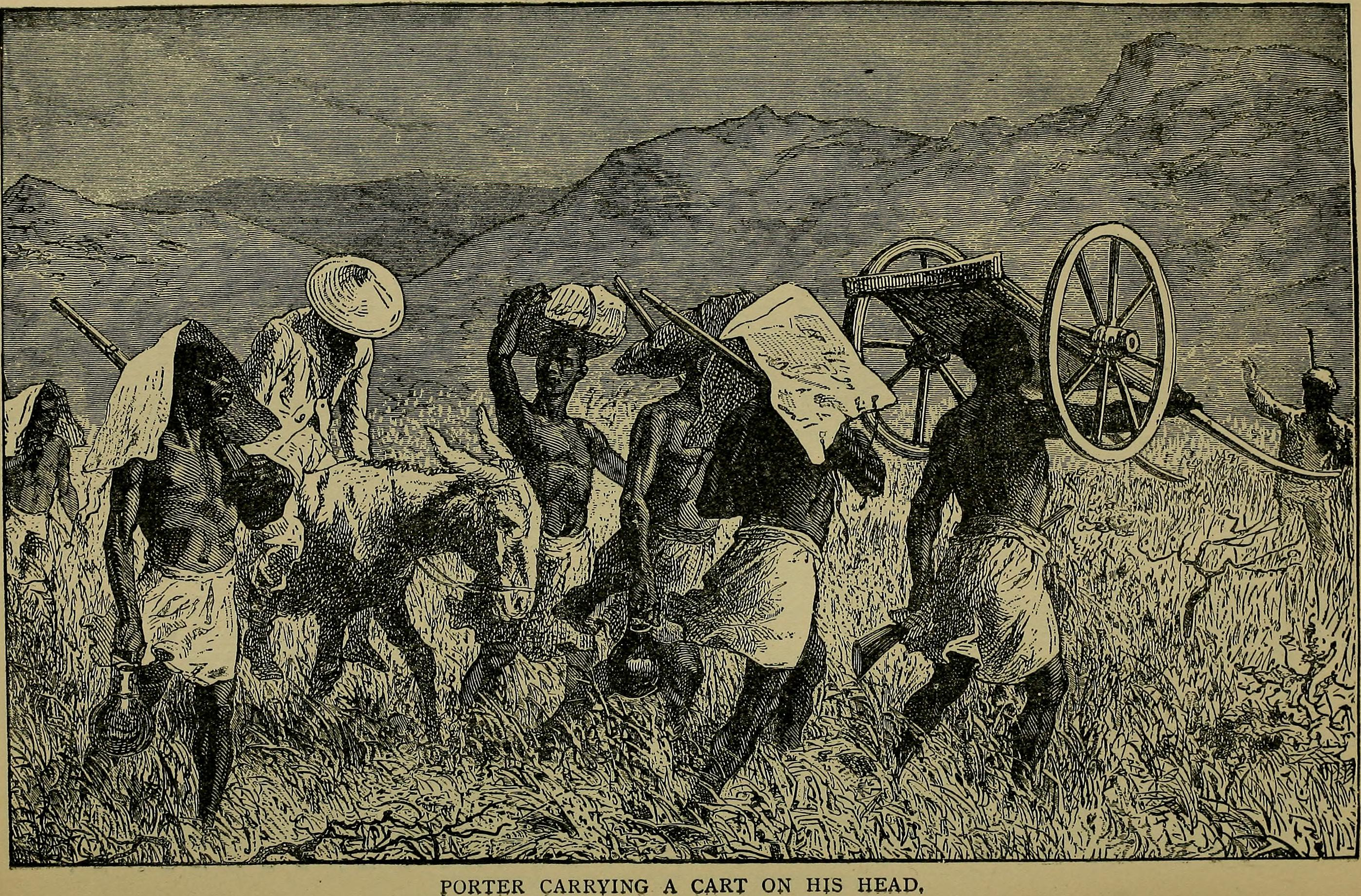
Drawing of Nyamwezi porters c.1889

== History ==
The original settlement, Kaole, was founded c. 800 CE, and grew into an important trading town by the 13th century. The Kaole Ruins contain the remnants of two mosques and 30 tombs, dated back to the 13th century. Until the 18th century, Bagamoyo, the settlement 5 kilometres (3 mi) north of Kaole, was a small trading center where most of the population were fishermen and farmers. Their main trading goods were fish, salt and gum, among others. Around the 17th century this area began growing in prosperity and by the 18th century it was an important stop in the caravan and slave trade, acquiring the name Bagamoyo. It became the most important trading entrepot of the east central coast of Africa in the late 19th century.

In the late 18th century, Muslim families settled in Bagamoyo, all of which were relatives of Shamvi la Magimba in Oman. They made their living by enforcing taxes on the native population and by trading in salt, gathered from the Nunge coast north of Bagamoyo. In the first half of the 19th century, Bagamoyo became a trading port for ivory and slave, with traders coming from the African interior – places as far as Morogoro, Lake Tanganyika and Usambara- on their way to Zanzibar. This explains the meaning of the word Bagamoyo ("Bwaga-Moyo") which means "Lay down your Heart" in Swahili. It is disputed whether this refers to the slave trade which passed through the town (i.e. "give up all hope") or to the porters who rested in Bagamoyo after carrying 16-kilogram (35 lb) cargoes on their shoulders from the Great Lakes region (i.e. "take the load off and rest"). There is considerable debate regarding the extent of the slave trade as a major export in Bagamoyo, with archival analysis suggesting that ivory was the primary export over slaves, and that many of the caravan porters on the ivory route were free wage laborers as opposed to slaves. However, the history of the slave trade features prominently in the shared culture of its residents and organizations such as UNESCO emphasize its importance as a cultural heritage site memorializing the slave trade in East Africa.

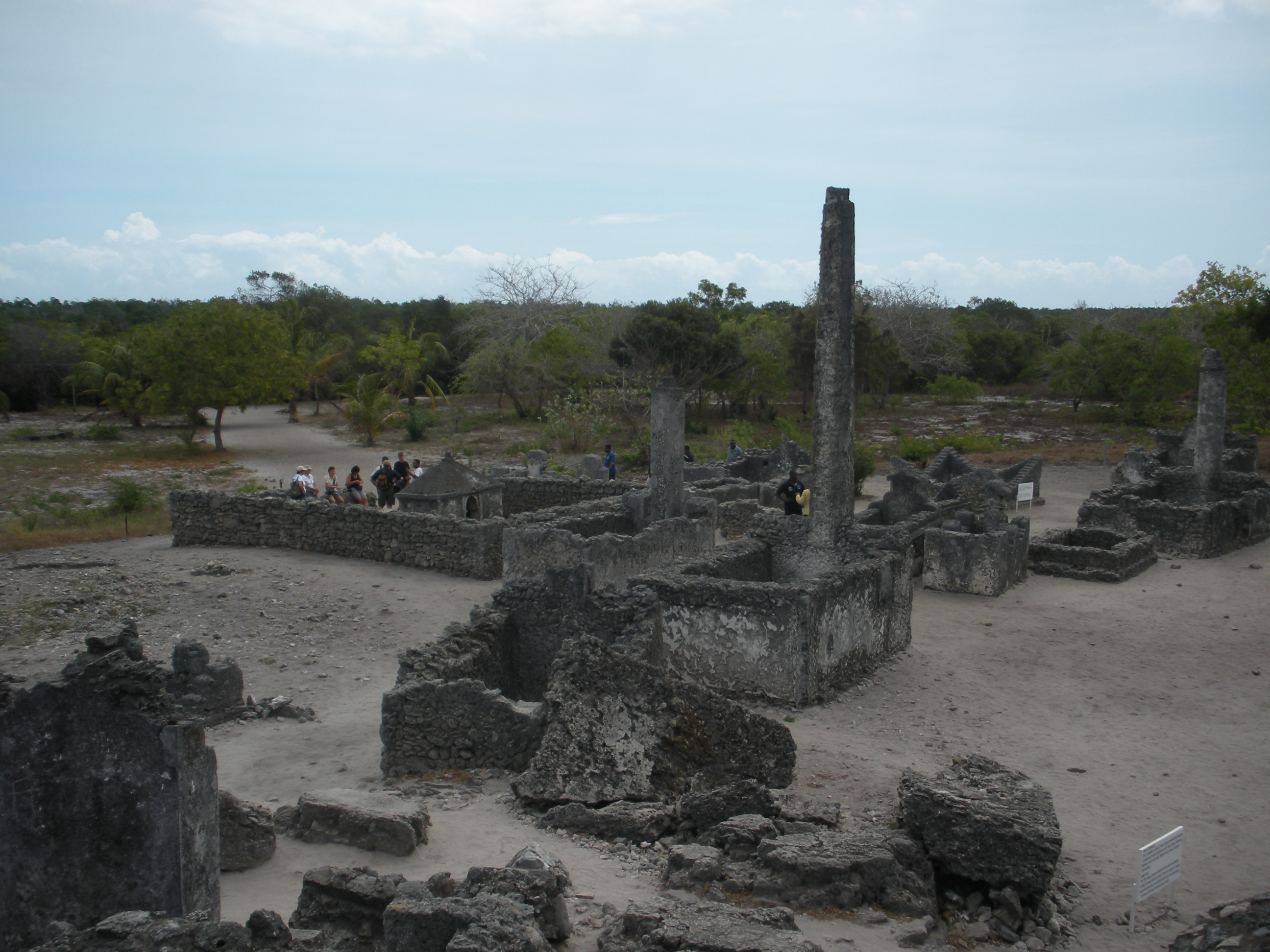
The Kaole Ruins

The slave trade in East Africa was officially prohibited in the year 1873, but continued surreptitiously to the end of the 19th century.

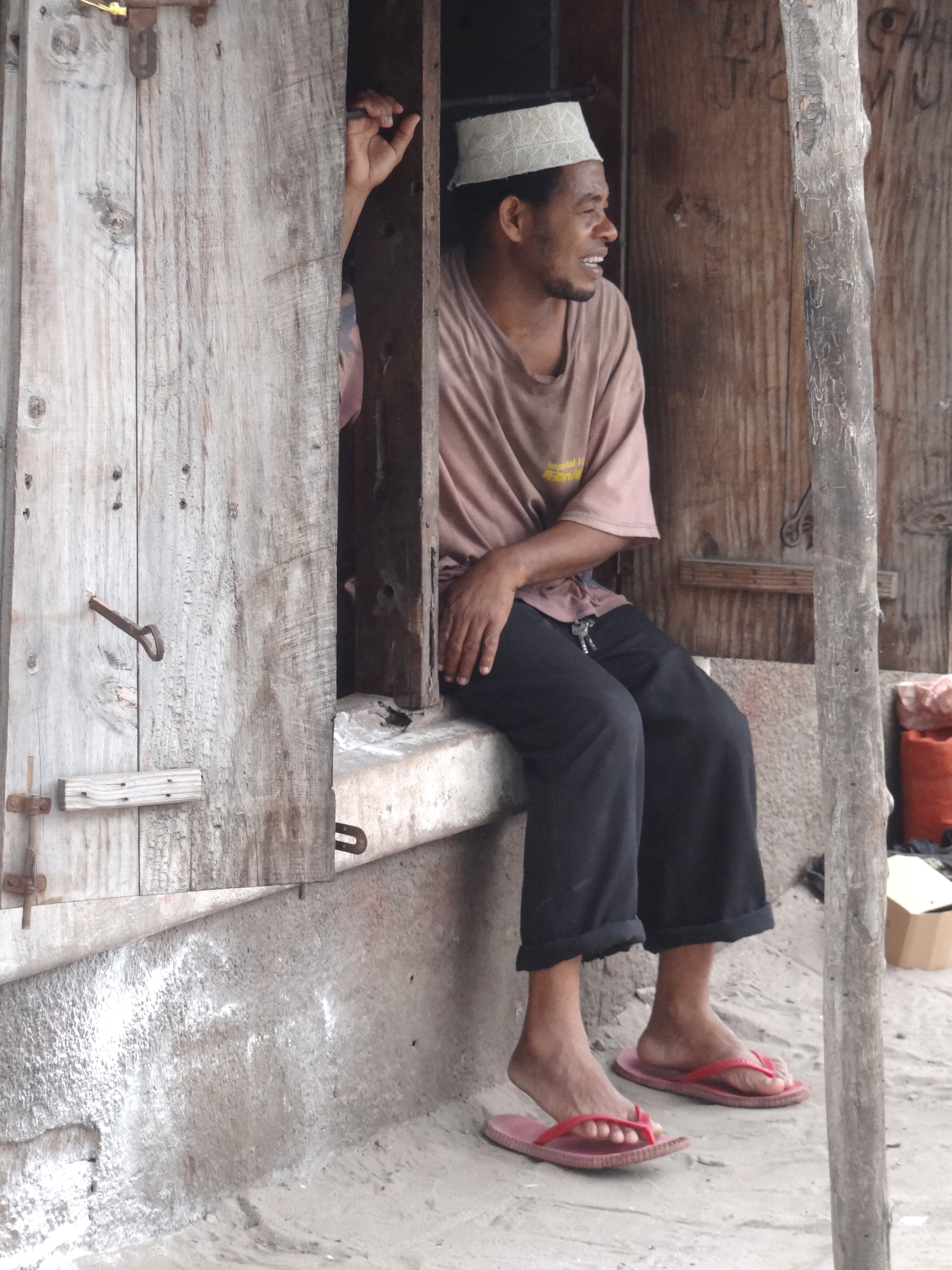
A Muslim man in Bagamoyo

In 1868, Bagamoyo local rulers, known as majumbe, presented the Catholic "Fathers of the Holy Ghost" with land for a mission north of the town, the first mission in East Africa. This caused resistance by the native Zaramo people which was mediated by representatives of Sultan Majid and, after 1870, by Sultan Barghash. Originally the mission was intended to house children who were rescued from slavery, but it soon expanded to a church, a school, and some workshops and farming projects.

But Bagamoyo was not only a trade centre for ivory and copra; it was also a starting point for renowned European explorers. From Bagamoyo they moved out to find the source of the River Nile and explored the African inner lakes. Some of these were Richard Francis Burton, John Hanning Speke, Henry Morton Stanley and James Augustus Grant. Although often believed so, David Livingstone had never been to Bagamoyo in his lifetime. Only after his death he was laid out in the Old Church's tower (nowadays named Livingston Tower) to wait for the high tide to come in and ship his body to Zanzibar.

Bagamoyo was the first capital of the colony while serving as the German headquarters of German East Africa (first under the auspices of the German East African Company and then the German Imperial Government) between 1886–1891. Dar es Salaam became the new capital of the colony in 1891. The town was apparently where SS-Oberführer Julian Scherner was born in 1895. When the German Empire decided to build a narrow gauge railway from Dar es Salaam into the interior in 1905, Bagamoyo's importance began to decline.

=== First World War ===
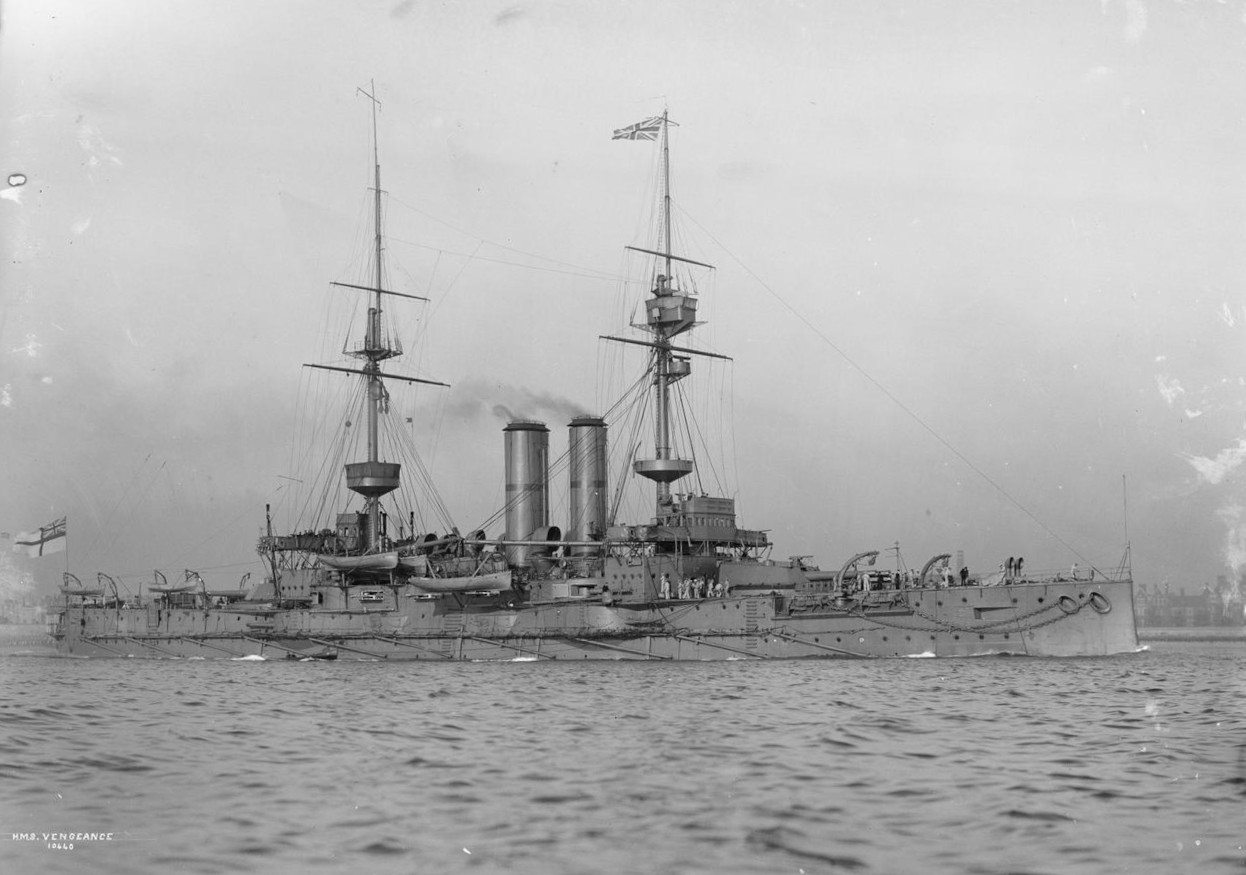
HMS Vengeance, flagship of the 1916 amphibous assault on Bagamoyo

In the East African campaign of World War I, British and Empire forces attacked Bagamoyo in August 1916. The Royal Navy bombarded the town with the protected cruiser HMS Talbot on 1 August and battleship HMS Vengeance on 4 August.

Before dawn on 15 August a flotilla anchored off Bagamoyo that included Vengeance, the protected cruiser Challenger, the monitors Severn and Mersey, the armed merchant cruiser Himalaya, and several auxiliary ships. The Royal Navy landed a force of 176 armed sailors, 65 Royal Marines and 55 Zanzibar Rifles to attack the town.

A kite balloon flown by HMS Manica directed a naval bombardment of German positions ashore. A seaplane from Himalaya bombed German trenches in the town, and then assisted in directing naval gunnery.

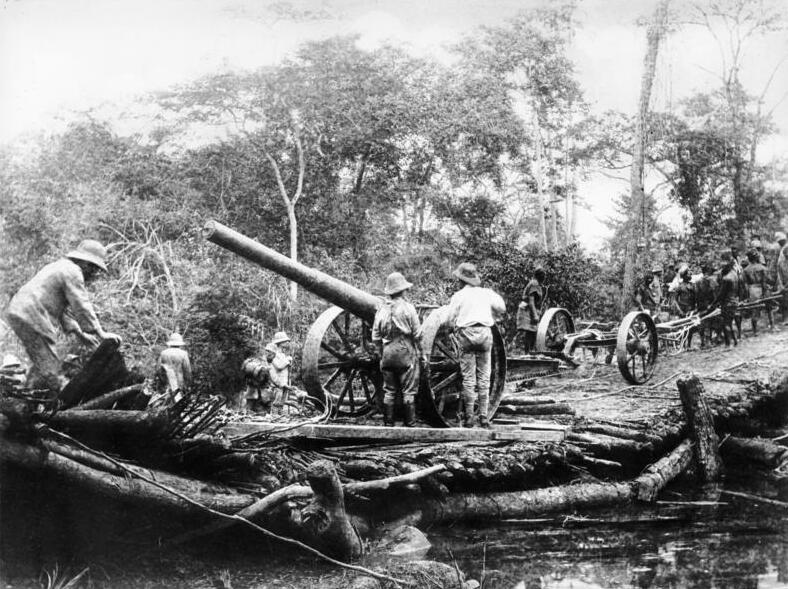
One of SMS Königsberg's 105 mm naval guns, converted to use on land

The Imperial German Army defended Bagamoyo with 60 German troops and 350 Askari Schutztruppe, commanded by German officers. However, many of the defenders were at Mtoni, about 6 kilometres (4 mi) west of Bagamoyo, defending a crossing over the Kingani River.

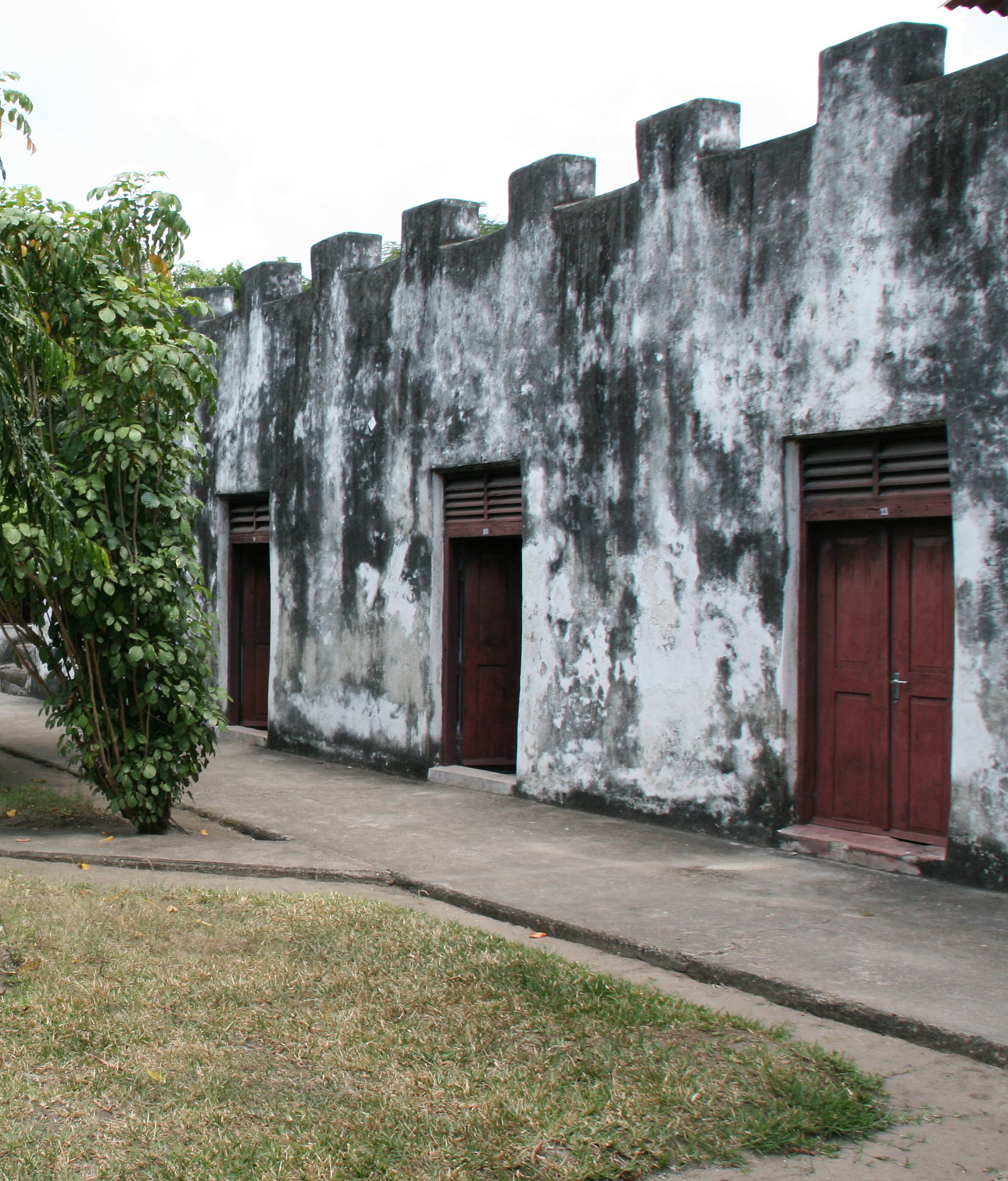
Part of the German garrison

The German defences of Bagamoyo included trenches along the shore, around the Arab and German forts, and on a hill just south of the town. German artillery included at least two small field guns on the shore, plus one of the 105 mm naval guns that had been salvaged from the cruiser SMS Königsberg, and installed in an emplacement on the hill with 100 rounds of ammunition.

Königsberg's gun engaged the monitors Severn and Mersey, which were some distance out to sea, but it could not be lowered enough to engage vessels nearer the shore. Three smaller Royal Navy vessels, including the armed tugboat HMS Helmuth, got within 500 metres of the German gun and opened fire on it with their 3-pounder guns. A British machine gun section then attacked the hill, eventually forcing the German artillerymen to abandon their gun and retreat. This was the first of Königsberg's guns to be captured by British forces.

Many civilians, whatever their religion, took refuge in the church at the Catholic mission. One British 12-inch shell hit the church, damaging the baptistry, and the two priests in charge of the mission moved the civilians to the Mission House. By the evening, German forces were retreating from their trenches. Royal Marines, supported by Zanzibar Rifles, captured the German Governor's house. The remainder of the town fell to British forces thereafter.

British forces lost one Royal Marine officer and ten men. German forces lost two officers and ten men, and another 19 were captured by the British.

=== 2006–present ===
Bagamoyo is a center for dhow sailboat building. The Department of Antiquities in Tanzania is working to maintain the ruins of the colonial era in and around Bagamoyo and to revitalize the town. In 2006, the department applied for World Heritage Site status, in the cultural category. The Bagamoyo College of Arts ("Chuo cha Sanaa") has been an internationally famous arts college in Tanzania, teaching traditional Tanzanian painting, sculpture, drama, dancing, and drumming. In 2007 based on the college, the Bagamoyo Arts and Cultural Institute (TaSUBa) was established.

Its history and proximity to Dar es Salaam has led Bagamoyo to be more diverse than some other areas of the country. Bagamoyo is home to many ethnic groups, including the Wakwere, Wazaramo, Wazigua, Maasai, and Waswahili. Although Swahili culture dominates, many different cultures coexist in Bagamoyo, including people of Arab descent.

In 2018, the new port construction began that will transform the area.

== Transport ==
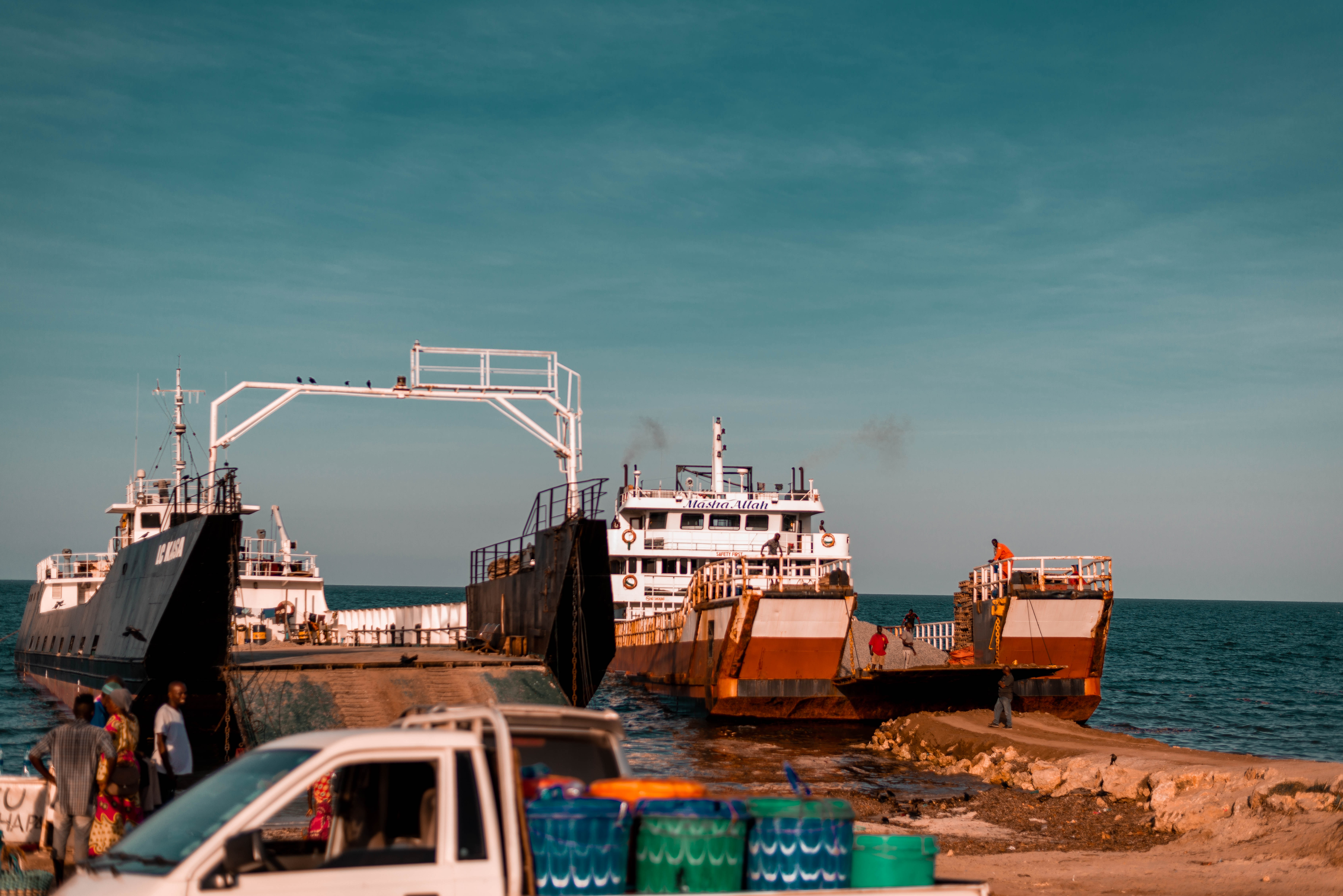
Ships at Bagamoyo

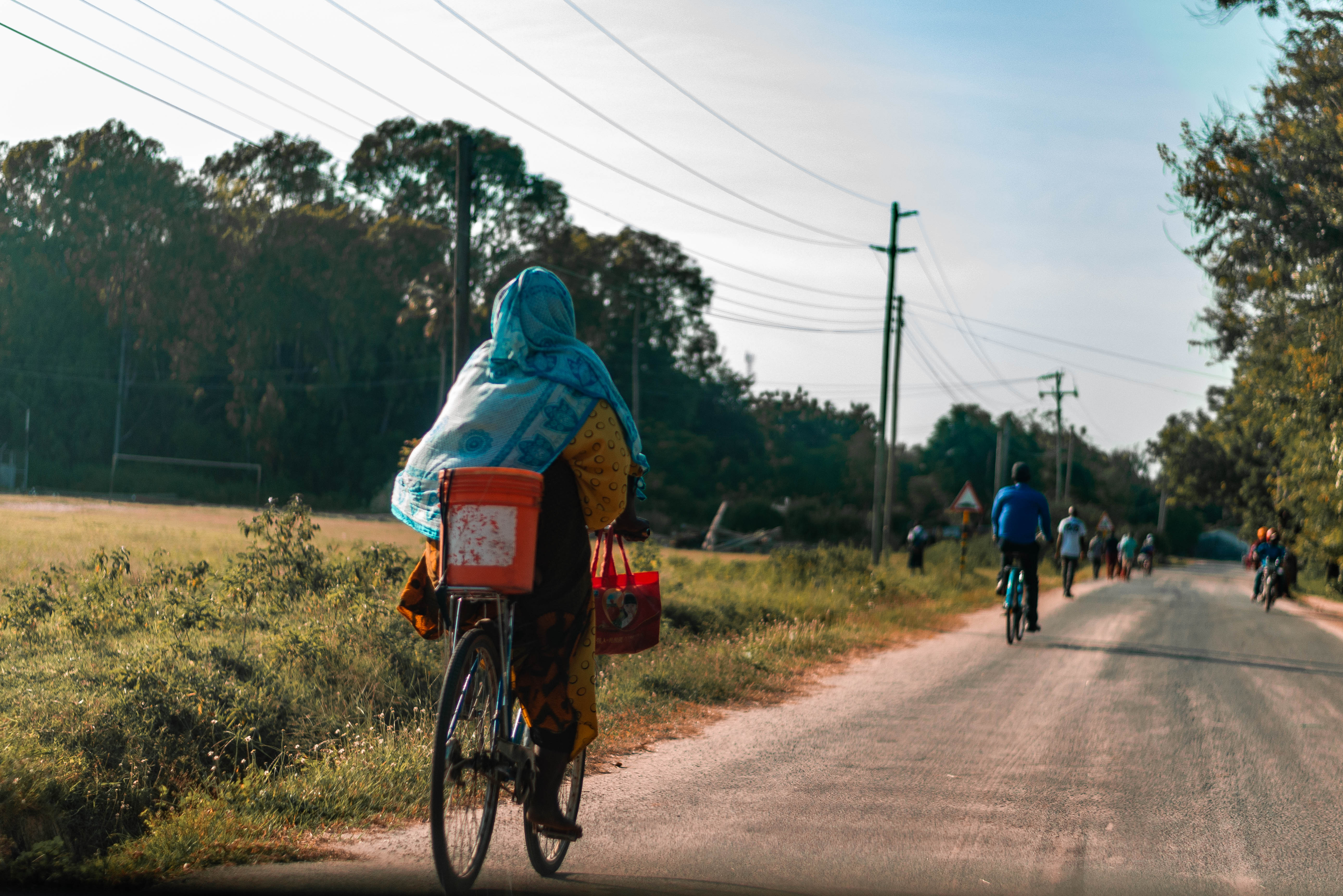
Cycling in Bagamoyo

=== Port ===
In 2013, a large two berth intermodal container deepwater port terminal was proposed by Tanzanian government. Called Bagamoyo Port, it will be constructed at Mbegani, near Bagamoyo. China planned to invest US$10B to make Bagamoyo the most important port in Africa by 2017. The port was part of the Maritime Silk Road.

In 2018, the project got the go ahead and work started in about June/July. It would have been built in association with the state-owned China Merchants Port, and would include a special economic zone. The project was backed by an Omani sovereign wealth fund.

In 2019 Tanzanian President John Magufuli announced the suspension of the project, which was acquired in 2025 by Saudi Arabia.

=== Public transport ===
Bagamoyo is served by the Bagamoyo Daladala stand near Bagamoyo road south east of Bagamoyo.

== Education ==
Bagamoyo hosts the Bagamoyo Arts and Cultural Institute.

== Notable inhabitants ==
- Sewa Haji Paroo, 19th century businessman of Indian origin
- Hukwe Zawose, Tanzanian traditional musician

== Twin towns and sister cities ==
- (United States) Vallejo, California
- Ahlen, Germany

== Gallery ==
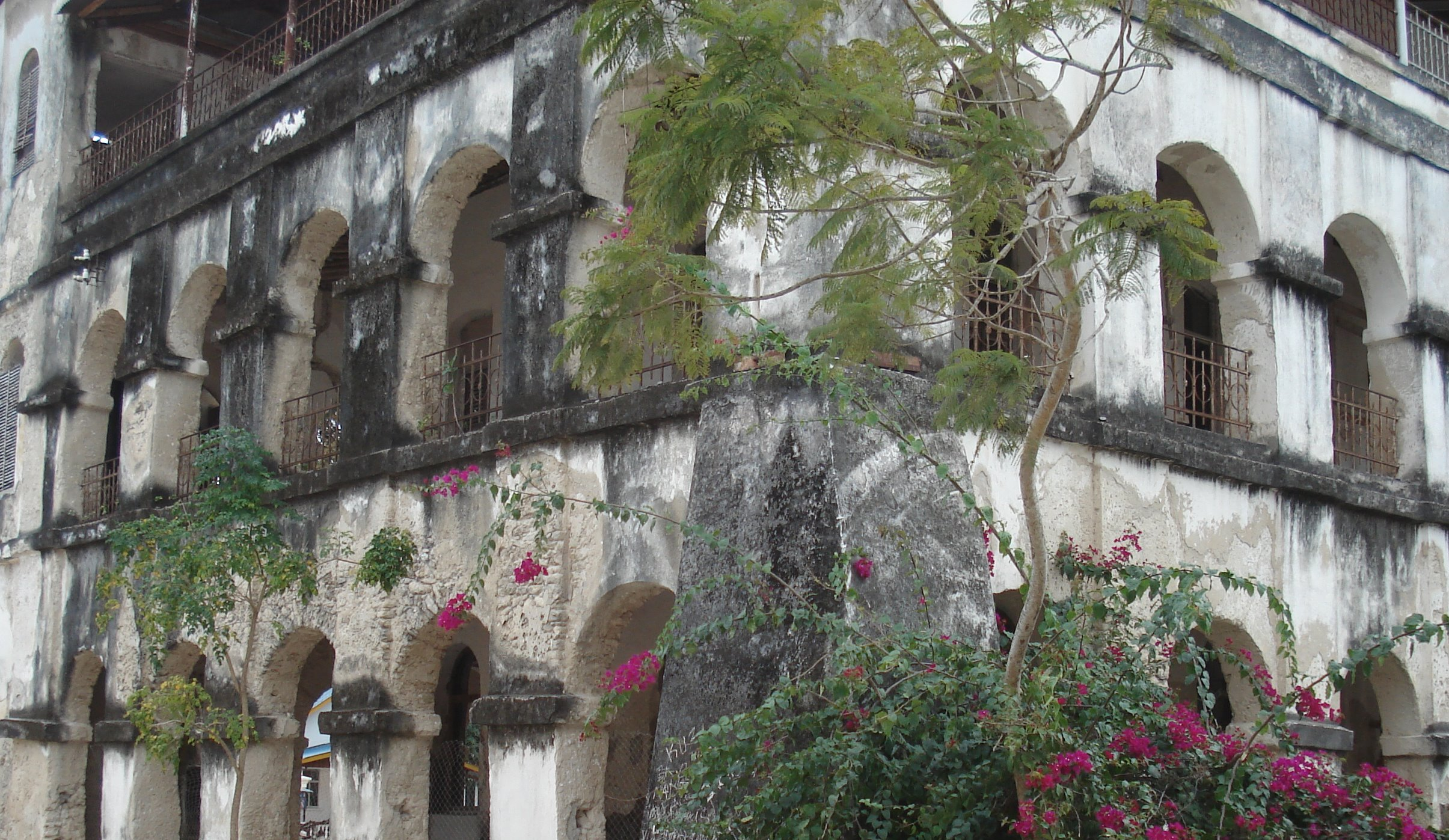
The Mission Building

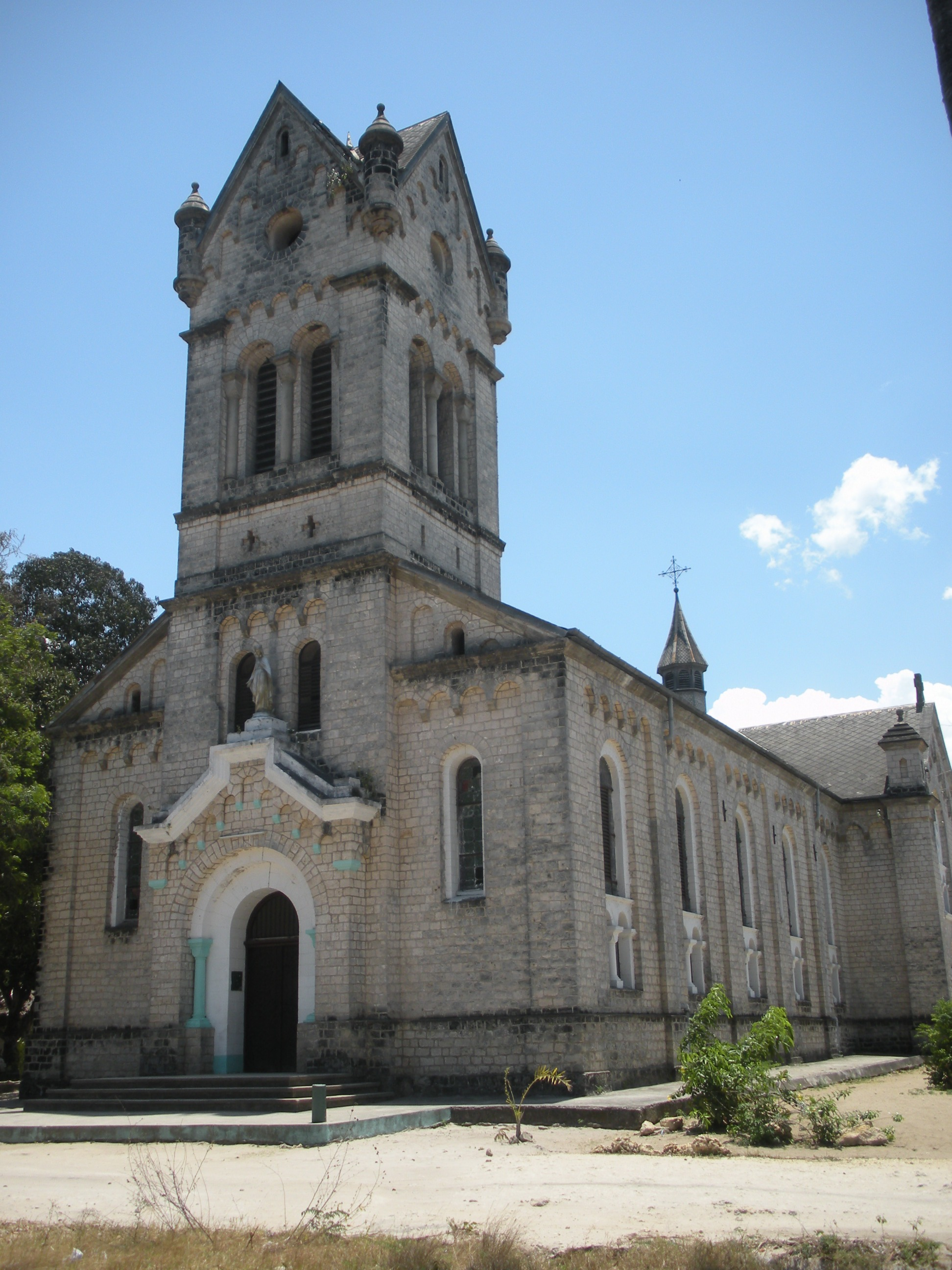
The Old Church

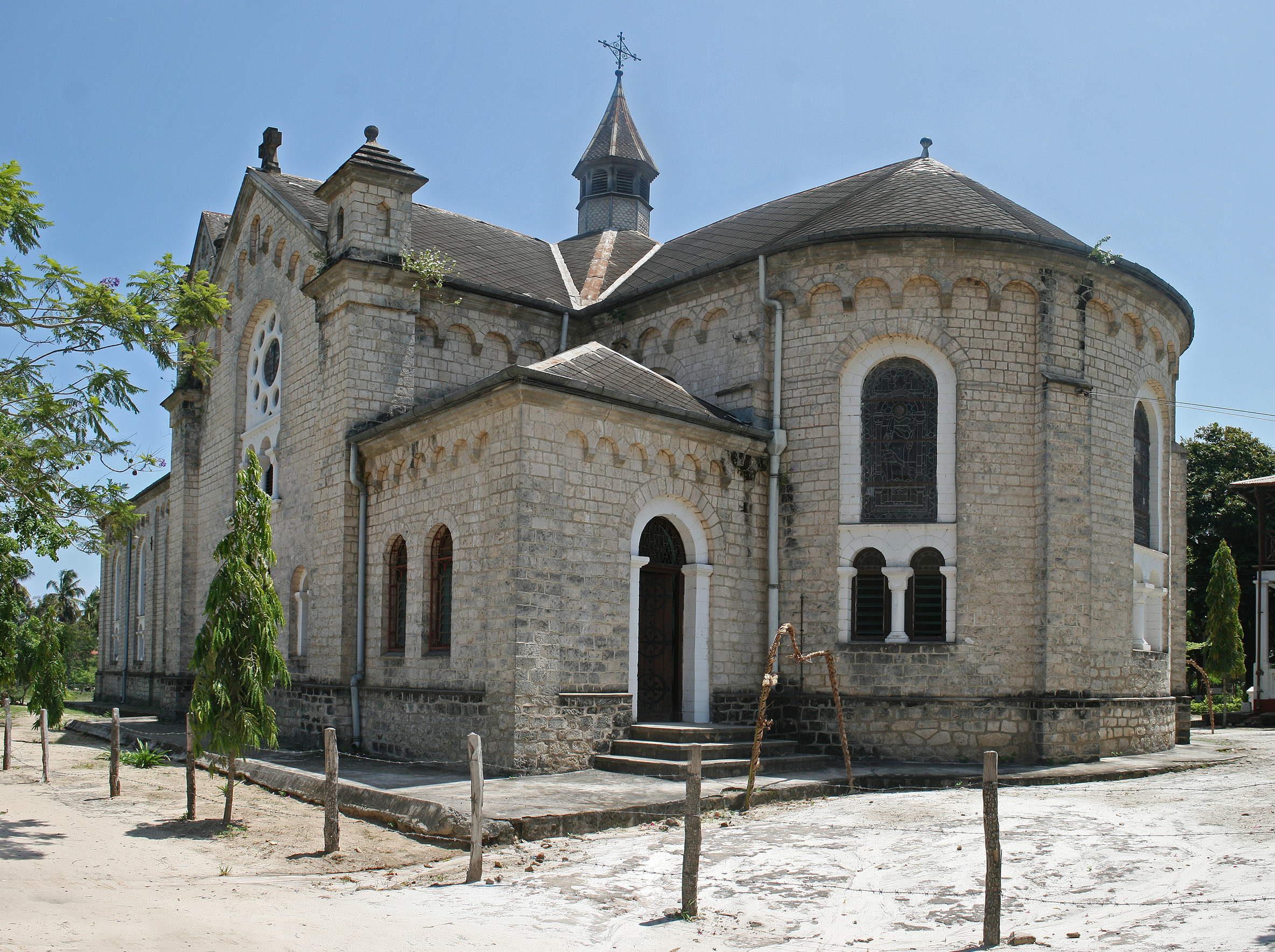
The second church built by the missioners

== See also ==
- List of Panamax ports
- List of former national capitals
- Bagamoyo Arts and Cultural Institute
- Historic Swahili Settlements
