= ARM Cement Limited =

Mining and manufacturing company in Kenya

- Type: Public Company; NSE: ARM
- Industry: Manufacture & Distribution of Cement
- Founded: 1974
- Founder: Harjivandas Paunrana
- Headquarters: Nairobi, Kenya
- Key people: Rick Ashley; Chairman; Pradeep Paunrana; Managing Director & CEO
- Products: Cement
- Revenue: US$15.4 million (KES:1.35 billion) (2013)
- Total assets: US$340 million (KES:29.7 billion) (2013)
- Website: Homepage

ARM Cement Limited, formerly Athi River Mining Limited, but commonly referred to as ARM is a mining and manufacturing company in Kenya, the largest economy in the East African Community. The company is headquartered in Nairobi and its stock is listed on the Nairobi Stock Exchange.

== Overview ==
ARM Cement is one of the largest manufactures of cement in Eastern Africa, accounting for 2.6 metric tonnes annually in 2014. ARM has operations in Kenya, Tanzania, and South Africa. Products manufactured include cement, fertilizers, quicklime, hydrated lime, sodium silicate and other industrial minerals. A new factory planned in Kitui, Kenya, is expected online in three to four years and will cost an estimated US$400 million to construct. Once operational, Kitui will increase ARM Cement Limited's production capacity to 5 million tonnes annually.

As of December 2013, the company's total assets were valued at US$340 million (KES:29.7 billion), with shareholders' equity of about US$94 million (KES:8.223 billion). Currently the Kenyan Operations Taken over by National Cement Kenya (Simba cement) and the Tanzanian Operations by Huaxin Cement a chinese firm.

== History ==
ARM was founded in 1974 by the late Harjivandas J. Paunrana as a producer of agricultural lime.

His son, Pradeep Paunrana, is the current Managing Director and CEO of the company. In Kenya, the company has factories in Mombasa and Athi River, where their first cement factory was established in 1994. Cement production at Athi River commenced in 1996.

== Shareholding ==
As of December 2014, the major shareholders in the company stock are as displayed in the table below:

ARM Cement Limited Stock Ownership
Rank	Name of Owner	Percentage Ownership
1	Amanat Investments Limited	28
2	Paunrana Pradeep Harjivandas	18
3	CfC Stanbic Bank Nominees A/C Nr 01503	7
4	ARM Cement Limited ESOP	4
5	Standard Chartered Nominees Non-Resident A/C: 9318	3
6	Tannel World Limited	1
7	Standard Chartered Bank a/c Pan African unit linked Fund	1
8	Standard Chartered Nominees Account KE 17984	1
9	Standard Chartered Nominees non-resident. a/c 967	1
10	Anjana Pradeep Paunrama	1
11	Others investors	35
	Total	100.00

== Company divisions ==
The company is divided into the following divisions:

Cement

The company brand, "Rhino Cement" is manufactured in Kaloleni and Athi River in Kenya, and at company owned factories in Tanga and Dar es Salaam in Tanzania. ARM Cement maintains shareholding in Kigali Cement Company, a cement company in Rwanda and in a South African cement company.

Mineral and Chemicals

The division is responsible for the manufacture of "Special Building Products, Sodium Silicate and Industrial Minerals.

Fertilizers

This division produces fertilizer at the Athi River factory, under the brand "Mavuno Fertilizer".

Rhino Foundation

Established in 2010, to invest in the communities where ARM Cement has a presence.

== Financial distress ==
According to The EastAfrican newspaper, ARM Cement was placed into administration in 2018, due to its inability to service its debts and meet its day-to-day financial obligations. George Weru and Muniu Thoithi of PricewaterhouseCoopers were appointed as joint administrators. The Nairobi Stock Exchange suspended the trading of the company stock, on 8 May 2020.

After the sale of some of the company assets in Kenya, Tanzania, Rwanda and South Africa, the joint administrators recommended the liquidation of the company, because the company assets could not fetch a price to match the amount owed to secured and unsecured creditors, in addition to shareholders. The liquidation process is expected to start on 30 September 2021. At the time ARM went into "receivership" on 18 August 2018, its total debt burden was approximately US$284 million.

== See also ==
- List of wealthiest people in Kenya
- Economy of Kenya
