= Trushar Khetia =

Kenyan businessman

- Born: 29 November 1986 (age 39); Kitale, Kenya
- Occupations: Businessman and entrepreneur
- Years active: 2013 – present
- Organization(s): Tria Group of Companies; Society Stores Supermarkets
- Known for: Business Acumen
- Spouse: 1

Trushar Khetia, is a Kenyan businessman and entrepreneur. He is the founder and current chairman and CEO of the Tria Group of companies, including a chain of supermarkets known as Society Stores Supermarkets.

== Background and education ==
He was born on 29 November 1986 in Kitale, in the Trans-Nzoia County of Kenya. The family owned a retail shop which has since morphed into Khetia Supermarkets. He studied at a local elementary school before transferring to Nairobi schools for his O-Level and A-Level studies. At age 17, in 2004, he was admitted to Manchester Business School, graduating in 2007, with the degree of Bachelor of Business Management, specializing in marketing.

== Career ==
Following graduation from university, he found employment in the United Kingdom, as a business development manager at Procter & Gamble (P&G), working there for 3 years until 2010. In June 2011, he returned to Kenya and worked in the family business in Kitale for one year. Following disagreements with some family members regarding business direction, he decided to relocate to Nairobi and strike out on his own. In 2013, he started Tria Group, a business that specializes in advertising on transit media like buses and airplanes. He started the business in Kenya and in 2014 he opened up a similar business in Tanzania.

In November 2014, using his savings from the P&G days, profits from his transit media businesses and loans from family and friends, Trushar Khetia acquired an operating supermarket in Thika, inclusive of stock. He closed the store down for ten days while re-branding and then opened his first Society Stores supermarket. As at March 2016, Society Stores owns and operates four supermarkets in Thika, Maua, Meru and Naivasha, with plans to open in Limuru and Nairobi in 2016.

== See also ==
- List of wealthiest people in Kenya
