= Sewa Haji Paroo =

Tanzanian philanthropist (1851–1897)

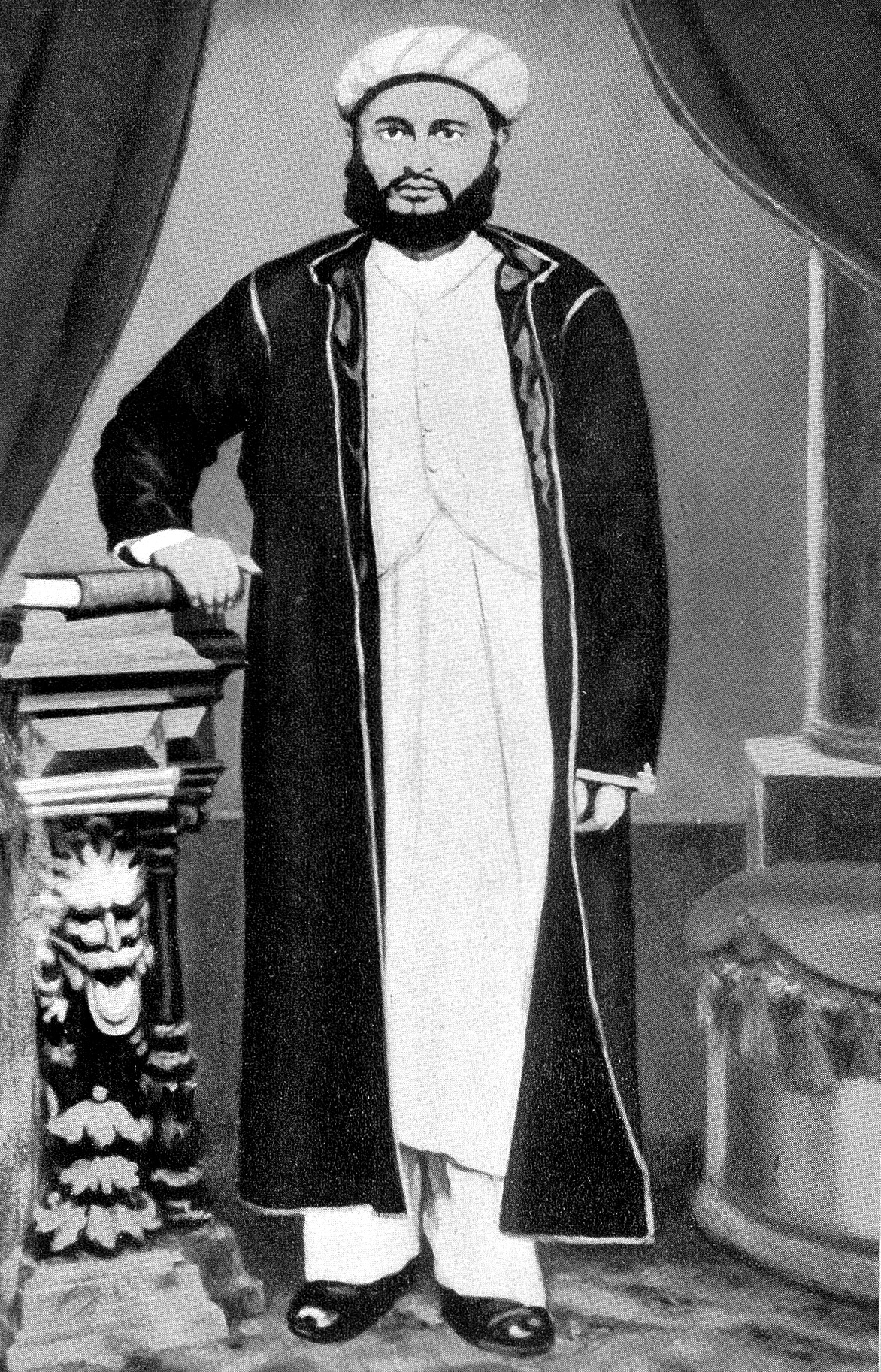
portrait of Sewa Haji

Sewa Haji Paroo (c. 1851 in Bagamoyo – 10 February 1897 in Zanzibar) was a businessman of Indian Ismaili origin. He was the main trader for the Sultan of Zanzibar. He was a significant philanthropist. He also founded and financed the Sewa Haji Hospital in Dar es Salaam.
