= Girdhari Lal Vidyarthi =

Kenyan Journalist

Girdhari Lal Vidyarthi (1910 - 31 July 1985) was a Kenyan journalist and an early pioneer of the free press in Kenya. He was the first journalist charged with sedition in Kenya.

== Biography ==
Vidyarthi was born in Nairobi to a Punjabi Hindu family. His father Shamdass Bootamal Horra arrived in East Africa in 1896 to work on the Uganda Railway. In 1930 he began the trilingual weekly magazine, Mitro, in English, Hindi and Urdi. In 1933, he co-founded the Gujarati-English newspaper, The Colonial Times with A.C.L. de Souza. That same year he started Kenya's first privately owned Kiswahili language newspaper Habari za Dunia ("News of the World") to cater for the African audience. He later published another weekly, Jicho ("The Eye") in 1952. The editorials in his papers were highly critical of discriminatory government policies, and this led to Habari za Dunia being banned in 1947 and Jicho in 1962. Between 1946-47, he was charged with sedition and sentenced to four months hard labour whilst in 1948 he was imprisoned for eighteen months because of a seditious letter published in Habari za Dunia.

His printing company, Colonial Printing Works, printed many other newspapers such as the Luo Magazine, Ramogi in the Dholuo language and Mumenyereri in Kikuyu. He died in Nairobi on 31 July 1985. His son Anil Kumar Vidyarthi followed him into the media trade, and was the last person in Kenya to be charged with sedition in 1998. i.
