= Aly Kassam-Remtulla =

American academic and writer

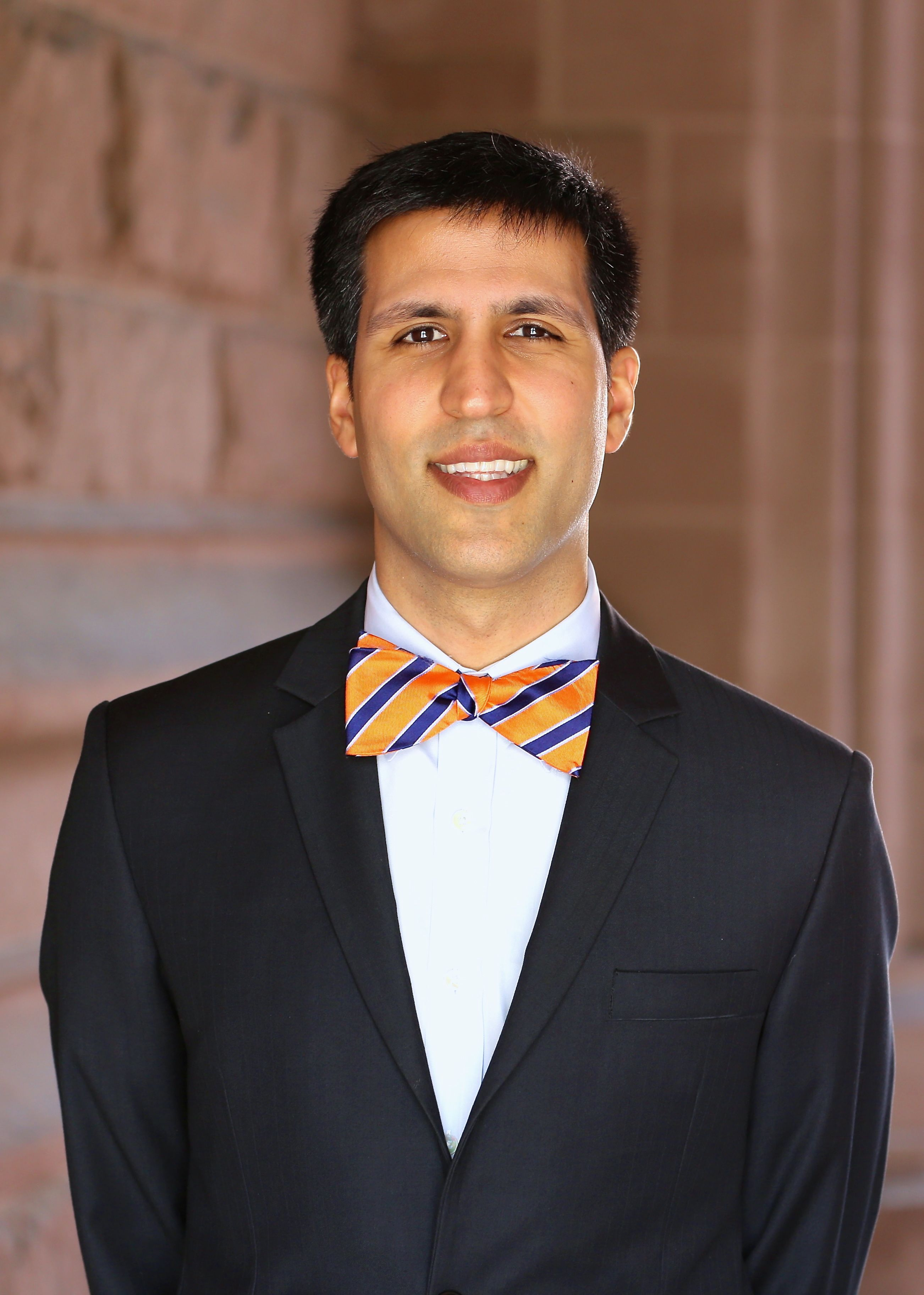
- Other name: Aly Remtulla
- Citizenship: Canada/USA
- Education: Stanford University; Oxford University
- Occupations: academic, writer and scholar
- Years active: 1996-present
- Known for: Vice Provost for International Affairs and Operations at Princeton University

Aly Kassam-Remtulla (also known as Aly Remtulla) is a U.S.-based academic, writer and scholar who is Vice Provost for International Affairs and Operations at Princeton University. Previously, he was associated with the MacArthur Foundation.

== Education ==
Kassam-Remtulla was born in Kenya and grew up in Canada. After completing his high school at the United World Colleges (UWC) USA campus, Aly received his undergraduate degree in Biological Sciences, Asian American Studies and Anthropology from Stanford University, in 1998. As an undergraduate, he worked in the laboratory of Nobel Laureate Paul Berg. He then studied as a Rhodes Scholar at Balliol College, where he received a master's degree, MBA, and doctorate from Oxford University, in (2012).

== Career ==
Since 1996, Kassam-Remtulla has been an academic researcher and scholar of immigrant Muslim communities. He has been widely cited by scholars of Ismailism, Islam, and those with interests in African Studies. He is a published poet and his journalism has appeared in WIRED, Al Jazeera, and Stanford Magazine.

As of 2020, he has been working as Vice Provost for International Affairs and Operations at Princeton University. Earlier, he worked on advancing diversity for graduate students and faculty members at Princeton and efforts to support Puerto Rico after Hurricane Maria. He co-founded and co-chairs the Faculty Advancement Network, a national consortium to promote diversity and inclusion in the American professoriate.

Aly has been awarded the Duke of Edinburgh's Gold Award, the Robert M. Golden Medal for Excellence in Humanities and Creative Arts and the Alberta Centennial Medal. He also received the Annetta Dieckmann Award from the American Civil Liberties Union of Illinois where he founded the Young Advocates Program. In 2022, he was inducted into the Stanford Multicultural Hall of Fame.

Kassam-Remtulla has served on numerous non-profit boards and is the chair of the board of trustees at the Mpala Research Centre in Kenya.

In 2021, he was appointed to the board of Allegheny College. In 2021, he joined the UWC-USA board of trustees and became a chair in 2022.

As of October 2021, he has been serving on the Admissions Advisory Panel for the Luce Foundation to develop a more open process for selection of Luce Scholars. As of October 2024, he was serving as a judge for the MacArthur Foundation's 100&Change $100 million competition.

== Publications ==
- (Dis)Placing Khojas: Forging identities, revitalizing Islam and crafting global Ismailism
- Kassam-Remtulla, Aly. Muslim Chaplaincy on Campus: Case Studies of Two American Universities. The United Kingdom, University of Oxford, 2012.
- Encounters: People of Asian Descent in the Americas, ISBN 978-0-8476-9144-9
- Contours Of The Heart (Asian American Writers Worksh), 1998, ISBN 978-1889876009
