= Baloobhai Patel =

Kenyan businessman

- Born: 1938 (age 87–88); Mathare, Nairobi, Kenya
- Occupations: Businessman, entrepreneur
- Years active: 1964–present
- Title: Managing Director & CEO; Transworld Safaris Limited

Baloobhai Patel is a businessman and entrepreneur in Kenya, the largest economy in the East African Community. He is the current managing director of Transworld Safaris Limited, a company that he owns. He also owns minority stakes in a number of publicly listed companies at the Nairobi Securities Exchange (NSE). He is reported to be one of Kenya's wealthiest citizens.

== Investment portfolio ==
His investments include the tour company Transworld Safaris Limited, which he fully owns and where he serves as the managing director. He also serves as a non-executive director at Pan Africa Insurance, where he is the largest non-institutional shareholder. He also maintains significant shareholding in Barclays Bank Kenya, Bamburi Cement, Carbacid Investments, Diamond Trust Bank Group, and Safaricom. In July 2013, his holding in NSE-listed companies was valued at KSh2.4 billion (approx. US$27.5 million).

== Investment philosophy ==
In keeping with many high-net-worth investors at the NSE, Baloobhai Patel invests primarily in blue chip stocks that pay regular dividends and have a tradition of steady appreciation in stock price. He rarely liquidates his stakes in these companies. He invests for the long-term, and occasionally invests more when the price temporarily falls. He is also diversified across many sectors of the economy, including manufacturing, banking, insurance, telecommunications and construction.

== See also ==
- Indian diaspora in East Africa
- List of African millionaires
- List of wealthiest people in Kenya
