= Pradeep Paunrana =

- Born: Pradeep Paunrana; 1959 (age 66–67); Nairobi, Kenya
- Education: University of Manchester, New York University Stern
- Occupations: Businessman, industrialist, entrepreneur
- Years active: 1984–present
- Known for: Former managing director of ARM Cement Limited

Pradeep Paunrana (born 1959) is a Kenyan businessman, entrepreneur, industrialist and philanthropist. He is the former managing director of ARM Cement Limited, one of the leading cement manufacturers in Eastern Africa.

== Early life and education ==
He was born in Nairobi 1959 and was educated in Kenyan schools. He studied in Manchester, England and obtained BA in Accounting & Finance from University of Manchester. He subsequently attended New York University Stern School of Business (NYU Stern), graduating in 1983, with the degree of Master of Business Administration (MBA). His father, the late Harjivandas J. Paunrana, who had dropped out of school at age 13, made sure his son received a good solid education.

== Career ==
From 1983 until 1984, Pradeep worked at a software company in New York, earning US$40,000 annually. He returned to Kenya in 1984, at the age of 24 at the request of his father who handed him the keys to the business in exchange for a percentage ownership, but no salary. Pradeep, therefore became the managing director of Athi River Mining Limited, as the company was known at the time.

From annual sales of KSh6 million (approx. US$70,000) in 1984, the business grew to annual sales of KSh14 billion (approx. US$160 million), in 2014. In 1994, the company which started with manufacturing fertilizer, animal feeds, ceramics, glass and plastics, began making cement for the first time. In 2007, the company which had changed names to ARM Cement Limited listed its shares on the Nairobi Securities Exchange (NSE).

Over the years, the company grew into the largest manufacturer of cement in East Africa, producing 2.6 million tonnes annually. Pradeep Paunrana, personally owns 18% of the company shares, making him one of the wealthiest individuals in Kenya.

== Other positions ==
He became the chairman of the Kenya Association of Manufacturers.

== See also ==
- Indian diaspora in East Africa
- List of African millionaires
- List of wealthiest people in Kenya
