= Indians in Kenya =

Ethnic group

Indians in Kenya Wahindi nchini Kenya
Total population
- 100,000 (2015 WEF estimate)

Regions with significant populations
- Nairobi, Mombasa

Languages
- Marwari, Gujarati, Punjabi, Telugu, Sindhi, Marathi, Konkani, Tamil, Hindustani, Odia (native languages); English, Swahili (working languages)

Religion
- Majority: Hinduism; Minority: Islam · Sikhism · Christianity · Jainism

Related ethnic groups
- Non-resident Indian and Person of Indian Origin and other Indo-Aryan peoples

Indians in Kenya, also known as Kenyan Asians, are Kenyan citizens with ancestral roots in the Indian subcontinent. Significant Indian migration to modern-day Kenya began following the creation of the British East Africa Protectorate in 1895, which had strong infrastructure links with Bombay in British India. Kenyan Asians predominantly live in the major urban areas of Nairobi and Mombasa, with a minority living in rural areas.

According to the World Economic Forum, the population of Kenyan Asians numbered around 100,000 in 2015. In 2017, Kenyan Asians were recognised by the Government of Kenya as the nation's 44th tribe.

== Terminology ==
In Kenya, the word Asian usually refers specifically to people of South Asian ancestry. Prior to the partition of India in 1947, those of South Asian ancestry were referred to as Indians; however, after 1947 the term Asian also started being used.

== History ==
=== Early history ===
Vasco da Gama recorded encountering Indian merchants along the coast of East Africa in the late 15th century. In Malindi, he obtained the service of a Gujarati speaking sailor to navigate ships across the Indian Ocean to Calicut. The Portuguese soon came to monopolise trade across the Indian Ocean and displace the existing Arab commercial dominance in the region. Although this affected India's commerce with East Africa, Indians were the accountants and bankers for the Portuguese as they had been for the Arabs.

By the early part of the 19th century, small numbers of Indian merchants could be found settled across the trading posts of East Africa. Their interests were enhanced when Said bin Sultan, the Sultan of Muscat and Oman, subjected to the emergence of British naval supremacy in the Indian Ocean and direct British political support for Indian merchants along the East African coast, adopted a series of favourable policies towards Indians in the region.

In 1887, the British East Africa Association was founded with its base in Bombay. The following year, the Association was given a royal charter, becoming the Imperial British East Africa Company and moving its base to Mombasa. Although now based in Africa, the company had a strong Indian orientation, employing guards, police officers, clerks and accountants from Bombay.

=== East Africa Protectorate ===
Significant Indian migration to modern-day Kenya began following the creation of the East Africa Protectorate in 1895. The Protectorate took over the assets and personnel of the Imperial British East Africa Company and hence its Indian orientation. The rupee was instituted as the currency of the Protectorate and the legal system became an extension of Indian law. Initially, British officials envisioned developing Kenya as the "America of the Hindu", considering Indians as sub-imperialist agents of civilisation in the region. Among the local Indian ethnic populace, the vast majority of administrative roles were filled by Konkani Goans, Parsis and Gujaratis, whilst the ranks of the British officered police and army mainly consisted of Punjabis.

Between 1896 and 1901, some 32,000 indentured labourers were recruited from India to construct the Uganda railway. The principal recruiting centre was Lahore, where coolies were engaged from the surrounding villages and sent to Karachi in special trains to catch specially chartered steamers of the British India Steam Navigation Company. Construction of the railway was a remarkable engineering feat; however, approximately 2,500 labourers died during construction (about four deaths for each mile of track laid) and the project was notorious for the Tsavo maneaters. Once the railway was completed, some of these labourers voluntarily settled in the Protectorate and brought families from India. The railway opened the interior to trade, and many soon began migrating away from the coastal cities. Over the following years, large numbers of Gujaratis and Punjabis migrated freely seeking to utilise new economic possibilities in the Protectorate. These migrants often came with family members or members of the same village or caste.

Asian settlers were soon joined by European farmers, who from 1902 onward were given large tracts of land in the White Highlands. The cooler Highlands, seen as more suitable for European settlement, were reserved by the government for the sole occupation of Europeans. Asian exclusion from these favourable lands caused friction between Asians and Europeans, which would last for decades. Many Asians instead settled in the new town of Nairobi, which from 1905 became the capital of the British protectorate, and where, unlike black Africans, Asians were permitted to reside legally. One of the most significant early pioneers was A. M. Jeevanjee. In 1890, his company, A.M. Jeevanjee of Karachi, was awarded the contract to supply labour for the building of the Uganda railway, and he subsequently went on to establish himself as the pre-eminent Asian businessman in the new colony. He established Kenya's first newspaper, now known as The Standard, in 1901 and was the first non-white to be elected to the Legislative Council in 1910. Such was his success that in 1904 it was estimated that he owned half of Mombasa and the greater part of Nairobi.

In 1900 the Mombasa Indian Association was established on the initiative of L.M Savle, and with the backing of wealthy businessmen Allidina Visram and the Jevanjee brothers, and became the first political organisation in the protectorate to represent the interests of Asians. Regional branches later emerged, including in Nairobi in 1906 which soon became more influential than the Mombasa association. To coordinate the aims of the different branches, the British East Africa Indian Association was formed in 1907. It soon became representative of only local interests and remained relatively unimportant. In 1914 the East African Indian National Congress was established in Mombasa and was modelled on the Indian National Congress. During the First World War the militant anti-imperialist Ghadar Party established a branch in East Africa, and attracted support from a number of the Asian community. The British authorities took a serious view of what they regarded as the Ghadar party's political terrorism and sentenced a number of members to death for either belonging to the party or possessing seditious material.

=== Kenya Colony ===
By the early 1920s, there was a sizeable Asian population who demanded a greater role in the developing political life of what became Kenya Colony. By this time, the entire retail trade inside Kenya came to be dominated by Indians. Racial hostilities gradually intensified in the 1920s; however, Indians, who enjoyed significantly greater economic strength than black Africans, had greater bargaining power with the colonial government. Indians had an advantage over Africans, as they had a higher literacy rate, were acquainted with English and had greater familiarity with Western culture. As early as 1920, they turned down the offer of two seats on the legislative council as this was not representative of the size of their community. Tensions with Europeans remained high until 1927, when Indians won the right to five seats on the council, compared to eleven reserved for the Europeans. Both parties prevented any African representation.

After the Second World War, Asians were found in all occupations in Nairobi and the townships: in business, the police force, bureaucracy, and the professions. Their commercial skills contributed to the economic development and prosperity of Kenya and the rest of East Africa.

The 1950s saw increased sentiment against the inequalities of colonial rule, and many Asians were at the forefront of the push for increased rights. These included: Pio Gama Pinto, founder of the Kenya African National Union newspaper, Makhan Singh who is regarded as laying the foundations of Kenyan trade unionism, and A.R. Kapila and Fitz de Souza known in the legal profession for their representation of those accused of Mau Mau links.

By 1962, the Asian community had firmly established its dominance within the urban economy. Despite accounting for only 2 percent of the overall population, they constituted one-third of the population of Nairobi, where their businesses dominated the main street. Prior to independence, Asians owned nearly three-quarters of the private non-agricultural assets in the country. The Gujarati community, in particular, thrived in a wide range of industries. Some of Kenya's largest and most prominent companies to date are controlled by Gujaratis, including Comcraft Group Manu Chandaria (Manufacturing).

== Independence ==
Kenya achieved independence from Britain in 1963 and thereafter followed a period of volatility in African and Asian relations. Asians, along with Europeans, were given two years to acquire Kenyan citizenship and surrender their British passports. Out of approximately 180,000 Asians and 42,000 Europeans in Kenya at the time, fewer than 20,000 had submitted their applications by the deadline. This, in turn, led to growing animosity and distrust from Africans. They considered those who failed to take up Kenyan citizenship as being disloyal.

Those without Kenyan citizenship soon became subject to increasing discrimination by the ruling government, led by Jomo Kenyatta. Despite the entrepreneurial success of the community, in 1970, 70% of the economically active Asian population consisted of wage and salary earners, and 30% worked for the civil service. A policy of Africanisation meant many were sacked in favour of black Africans. The Kenyan Immigration Act 1967 required Asians to acquire work permits, whilst a Trade Licensing Act passed in the same year limited the areas of the country in which non-Kenyans could engage in trade. In the late 1960s and early 1970s, faced with a dim future in Africa, many Asians chose to utilise their British passports and settle in the United Kingdom. Consequently, the Asian population in Kenya declined from 179,000 in 1962 to 139,000 in 1969 and to 78,000 in 1979. Asian migrants to the United Kingdom settled mainly in the English cities of London and Leicester.

== Present day ==
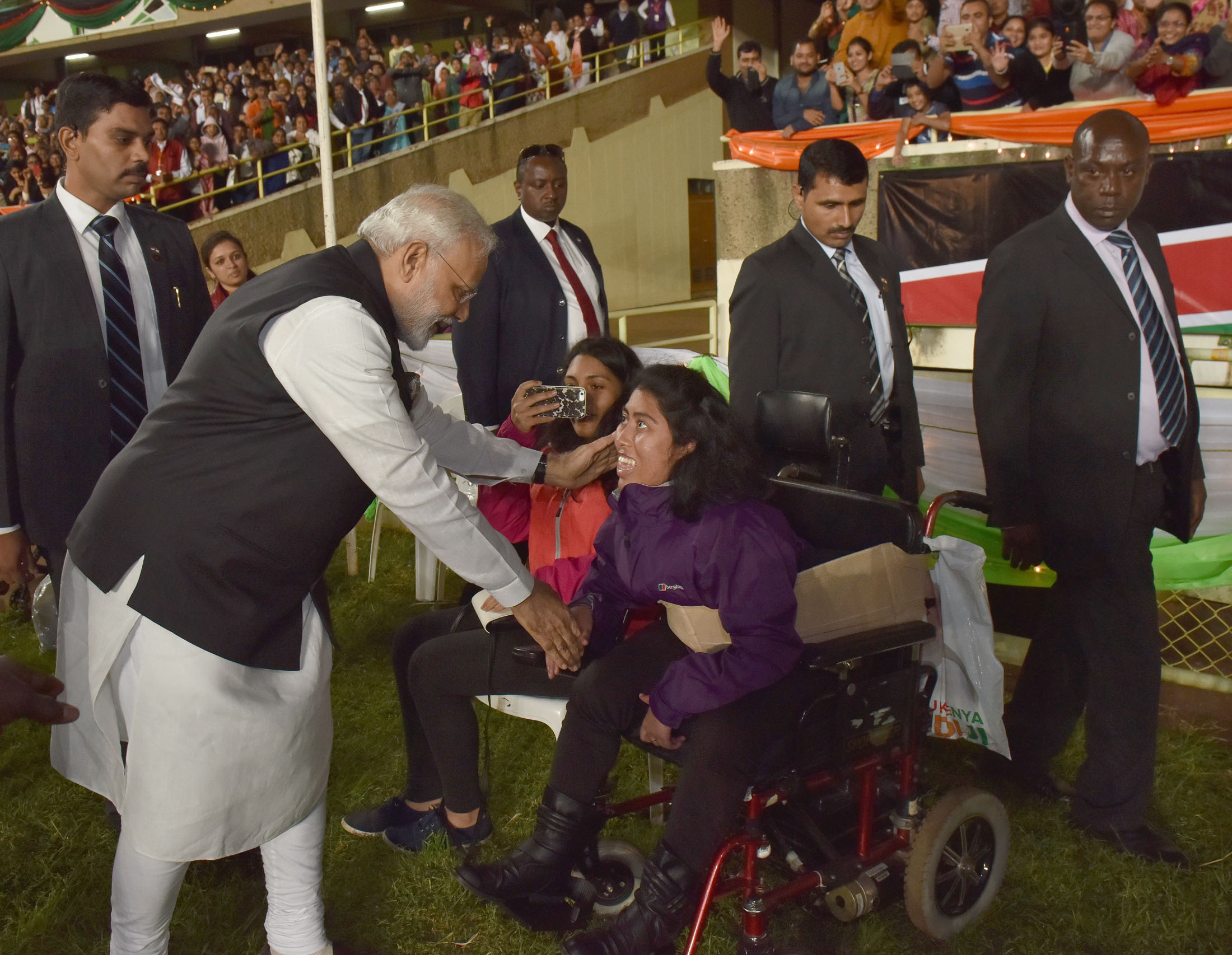
Indian Prime Minister Narendra Modi meets members of the Indian community in Nairobi, 8 July 2016

After visiting Kenya in the 1970s, Indo-Trinidadian writer Shiva Naipaul, remarked that in Africa, "the Asian is the eternal 'other.'" Instead of dissolving into a multiethnic, multicultural melting pot like other diasporas, he observed that "the Indian in East Africa brought India with him and kept it inviolate". Those who remained saw a gradual improvement in their legal status. However, the Asian community continued to be cautious and inwardly self-reliant. Despite varying degrees of acculturation, most have retained their strong Indian ties and traditions, and are a close-knit, endogamous community.

Following the 1982 Kenyan coup d'état attempt to remove President Moi, many Asian shops and businesses in Nairobi were attacked and pillaged. Despite fears at the time within the community, it did not result in another exodus of Asians from the country.

On 22 July 2017, the Uhuru Kenyatta government announced that the Asian community would be officially recognised as the 44th tribe in Kenya, recognising the community's contribution to Kenya from the dawn of the nation.

== Demography and religion ==
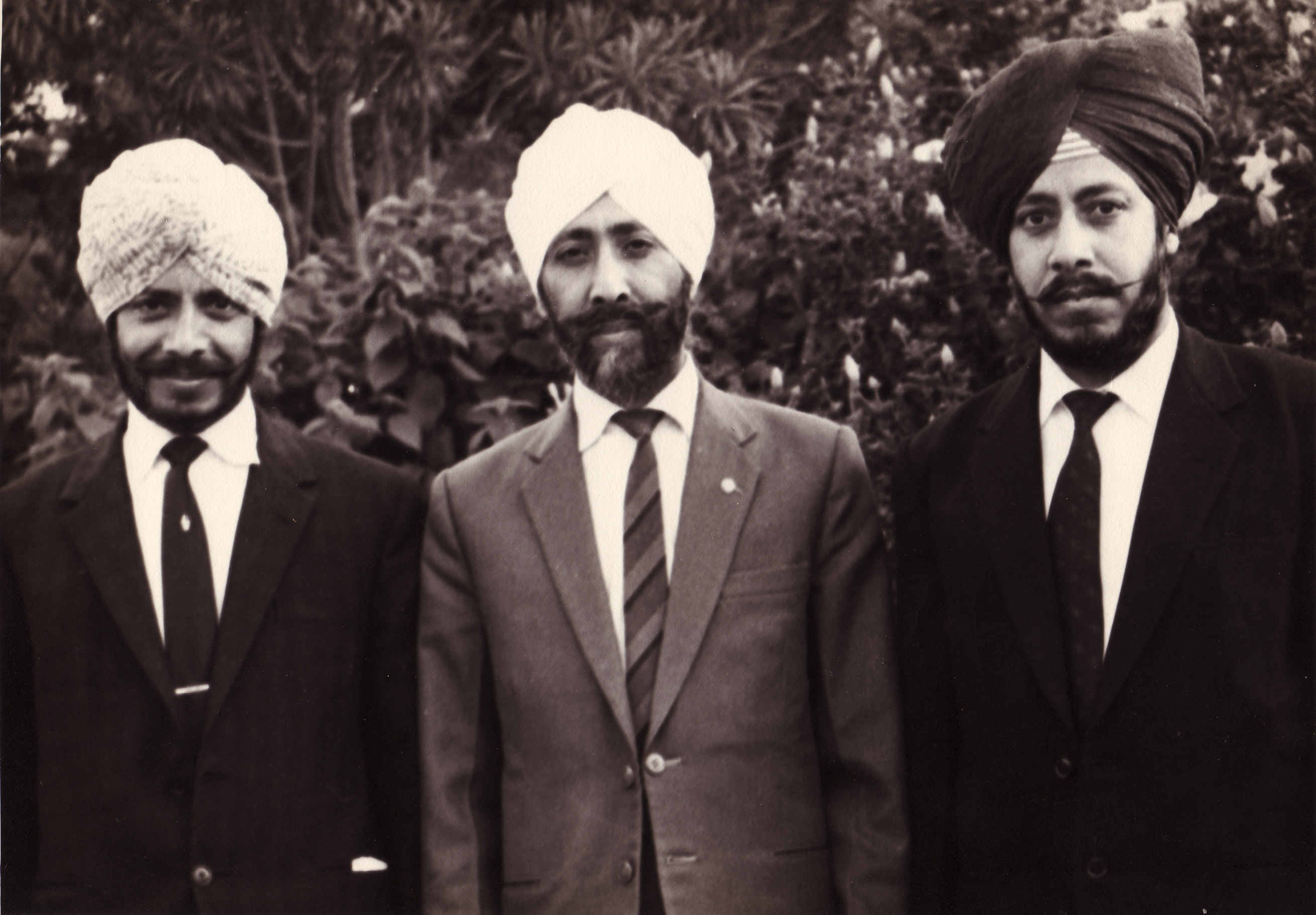
Three Sikh brothers in Kenya in 1961

The 2019 Kenyan Census recorded 47,555 Kenyan citizens of Asian origin, while Asians without Kenyan citizenship numbered 42,972 individuals.

Asian ethnic groups mostly originate from a few places in South Asia. The majority of Asians trace their ancestry to the regions of Rajasthan, Gujarat and Punjab. There are also large numbers who originate from Maharashtra, Odisha, Goa, and Tamil Nadu. Languages spoken by Asians include Marwari, Gujarati, Hindustani, Marathi, Konkani, Kutchi (as well as the creole language Kutchi-Swahili), Odia, Punjabi, Sindhi, and Tamil.

The majority of Asians are Hindu. The leading Gujarati caste-based subgroups within Kenyan Hinduism include Lohanas, Lohars, Rajput, Patels and Mehtas, among others. Their largest concentration is in Nairobi, where mandirs can be found in most neighbourhoods. The next largest community are Muslims; the majority being Sunni Muslims, however there is a significant Shia minority, including Ismailis (Khoja and Bohra) and Ithnā'ashariyyah. There are also sizeable communities of Sikhs and Jains, and smaller numbers of Roman Catholics.

Population census

Year	Pop.	±% p.a.
1911	11,787	—
1921	25,253	+7.92%
1931	43,623	+5.62%
1948	97,687	+4.86%
1962	176,613	+4.32%
1969	139,037	−3.36%

Year	Pop.	±% p.a.
1979	78,600	−5.54%
1989	89,185	+1.27%
1999	89,310	+0.01%
2009	81,791	−0.88%
2019	90,527	+1.02%

Post 1947 figures include those born in either India or Pakistan.

== See also ==
- India–Kenya relations
- List of Kenyan Asian people
- Demographics of Kenya
- Expulsion of Asians in Uganda in 1972
- Indian diaspora in East Africa
- Indian diaspora in Africa
- White people in Kenya

== Bibliography ==
- Indians of Africa, Rudy Brueggemann, 2000.
- A New View of Kenya's 'Asians', Washington Post 15 March 2000.
- More Kenyan Asians flee to Britain: BBC, 4 February 1968. Reprinted by BBC.co.uk, "On this Date", n.d.
- The Lost Indians of Kenya, Salim Lone, New York Times Review of Books, Volume 17, Number 5 · 7 October 1971.
- 'We're all Kenyans here', Shashi Tharoor, The Hindu, 7 November 2004.
- The Indian Diaspora in Africa, Ruth DeSouza.
- Vincent Cable The Asians of Kenya, African Affairs, Vol. 68, No. 272 (Jul. 1969), pp. 218–231
- Randall Hansen. THE KENYAN ASIANS, BRITISH POLITICS, AND THE COMMONWEALTH IMMIGRANTS ACT, 1968. The Historical Journal (1999), 42: 809–834 .
- Unfree Labour: Family History Sources for Indian Indentured Labour. Research Guide from The British National Archives, 2006.
