= Smriti Vidyarthi =

Kenyan news anchor and reporter

- Born: Smriti Vidyarthi; 2 January 1985 (age 41); Kenya
- Citizenship: Kenyan
- Education: University of Warwick (BA); City University (MA)
- Occupations: NTV News Anchor (2008–2025); K24 (January–September 2008)
- Years active: 2008–present
- Employer: Nation Media Group
- Organization: Nation Media
- Known for: Hosting NTV Wild Talk, NTV Weekend Edition, and NTV Tonight
- Notable work: NTV Tonight; NTV This Morning
- Spouse: Aman Mohindra (m. 2009)
- Children: 1
- Relatives: Girdhari Lal Vidyarthi (grandfather)
- Awards: Media Council Annual Journalism Excellence Award (2013)

Smriti Vidyarthi is a Kenyan news anchor and former reporter at NTV, where she hosted programs such as NTV Wild Talk, NTV Weekend Edition, and NTV Tonight.

== Early life and education ==
Smriti Vidyarthi was born in Kenya. She is the granddaughter of the journalist Girdhari Lal Vidyarthi.

== Career ==
Vidyarthi started working at K24 as a news anchor in January 2008. In September 2008, she joined NTV. At NTV, she has anchored and hosted various programs, including NTV This Morning, NTV Tonight, and the wildlife-focused show NTV Wild Talk, which aired weekly at 10:00 PM East African Time.

Her work on NTV Wild Talk involves raising awareness about wildlife conservation and environmental issues. She has interviewed former first lady Margaret Kenyatta about the Hands Off Our Elephants campaign.

She departed Nation Media Group after 16-and-a-half years on 10 February 2025.

== Achievements ==
In 2013, Smriti won the Media Council's Annual Journalism Excellence Award in the Television & News Bulletin category, recognizing her outstanding contributions to Kenyan media.
