= Bahadur Tejani =

Bahadur Tejani (born 1942) is a Kenyan poet, novelist, playwright and literary critic.

== Early life and education ==
Tejani was the son of Gujarati parents. He studied literature at Makerere University College in Uganda and philosophy at Cambridge University in England, before gaining a PhD in literature from the University of Nairobi, where he also had experience as a lecturer. He also later taught at the University of Sokoto in Nigeria.

== Works ==
His first novel, Day After Tomorrow, was published in 1971; this was the first novel written by an Indian from East Africa. It explores ideas of postcolonial culture through the experiences of Samsher, an Indian who marries an African.

Tejani has published a collection of poems about India, entitled The Rape of Literature and Other Poems (1989). His work has also appeared in anthologies such as Poems from East Africa (1971) and Poems of Black Africa (1975).

Tejani's work has influenced other African authors, such as MG Vassanji and Peter Nazareth.
