= The Standard (Kenya) =

Newspaper in Nairobi, Kenya

- Type: Daily newspaper
- Format: Berliner
- Owner: The Standard Group
- Founder: A.M. Jeevanjee
- Publisher: The Standard Group PLC
- Editor-in-chief: Chaacha Mwita
- Associate editor: Alex Kiprotich
- Founded: 1902; 124 years ago (as African Standard)
- Language: English
- Headquarters: Nairobi, Kenya
- Country: Kenya
- Circulation: 150,000 (as of 2016)
- ISSN: 1025-8450 (print); 1605-9638 (web)
- OCLC number: 57067254
- Website: standardmedia.co.ke

The Standard is the oldest newspaper in Kenya.

It is published by The Standard Group, which also runs the Kenya Television Network (KTN), Radio Maisha, The Nairobian (a weekly tabloid) and Standard Digital which is its online platform. The Standard Group is headquartered on Mombasa Road, Nairobi, having moved from its previous premises at the I&M Bank Tower.

== History ==
The newspaper was established as The African Standard in 1902, as a weekly, by Alibhai Mulla Jeevanjee, an immigrant businessman from British India. In 1905, Jeevanjee sold the paper to Maia Anderson and Rudolf Franz Mayer, who changed the name to the East African Standard. It became a daily paper and moved its headquarters from Mombasa to Nairobi in 1910. At the time the newspaper strongly supported colonialist viewpoints.

The British-based Lonrho Group bought the newspaper in 1963, only a few months before Kenya's independence (they were a colony of Britain). The paper changed its name to The Standard in 1977 but the name East African Standard was revived later. It was sold to Kenyan investors in 1995. In 2004 the name was changed back to The Standard. It is the main rival to Kenya's largest newspaper, the Daily Nation.

In 1989, the Standard Group acquired the KTN Television Channel.

== 2006 premises raid ==
In late February 2006 The Standard ran a story claiming that president Mwai Kibaki and senior opposition figure Kalonzo Musyoka had been holding secret meetings. At 1:00 am local time (2200 UTC), on 2 March, masked gunmen carrying AK-47s raided the editorial office of The Standard, and its television station KTN. They assaulted staff members, forcibly took computers and transmission equipment, burned all the copies of the 2 March edition of the newspaper, and damaged the presses.

At KTN, they shut down its flow of electricity, putting the station off the air. Initially, the Kenyan information minister denied knowledge of the raid, but later revealed that Kenyan police were responsible, and stated that the incident was to safeguard state security. "If you rattle a snake you must be prepared to be bitten by it," John Michuki said. Three journalists at The Standard, arrested after the critical story was printed, were released on 2 March on bail of 50,000 Kenyan shillings (US$692).

== Alleged government abductions ==
=== 2026 attempted abduction of editor ===
On 27 June 2026, three men in plainclothes and armed with AK-47 assault rifles intercepted The Standard associate editor Alex Kiprotich while he was driving to work in Nakuru; he was able to escape after locking his car doors and driving away. The incident occurred three days after William Ruto, the President of Kenya, criticised The Standard on X, accusing it of producing "EXTORTIONIST propaganda HEADLINES" against him and his government. The international journalistic rights group Committee to Protect Journalists called on Kenyan authorities to investigate the attempted abduction.

=== 2026 abduction ===
Alex Kiprotich was abducted a few minutes before 9:20 pm on the Gilgil-Nakuru road while traveling to Nakuru. Video of the abduction showed masked men with guns trail and block off the journalist from the road. The men dragged him out of his car as he screamed "Nimefanya nini?" in Swahili which translates to "what have I done?". He was found abandoned at Masinga Dam by a team from the Standard Media Group. The abduction was condemned by the Nakuru Journalist Association which called for an urgent, transparent and independent investigation into it and the previous June attempt. Its chairperson stated that no journalist in the country should face threats, intimidation, assault or abduction for their work.
