= Achhroo Ram Kapila =

Kenyan lawyer (1926-2003)

- Born: 25 August 1926; Ludhiana, Punjab, India
- Died: 15 October 2003 (aged 77)
- Citizenship: Kenya, India
- Occupations: Lawyer and Attorney
- Years active: 1992-2003
- Known for: Kapenguria Six

Achhroo Ram Kapila (1926 – 15 October 2003), usually known as A.R. Kapila or Achhroo Kapila, was one of Kenya's preeminent criminal trial lawyers. He represented several African leaders and political activists, as well as others who lacked the means to hire defence lawyers.

Born in Ludhiana, Punjab, India, his family moved to Kenya in 1930 and he remained there for the rest of his life.

Kapila was called to the Bar at Lincoln's Inn in London in 1946, and rose to fame in October 1952 when he was one of the lawyers who unsuccessfully defended the Kapenguria Six, a group of Kenyan political figures accused of Mau Mau links (Jomo Kenyatta, Bildad Kaggia, Kung’u Karumba, Fred Kubai, Paul Ngei and Achieng Oneko). Kapila worked with the British barrister, D.N. Pritt, and a team of Kenyan and other African and Indian lawyers including Fitz De Souza. Subsequently, he represented other African leaders, including Julius Nyerere of Tanzania and Albert René of Seychelles.

Following independence Kapila spoke out against the increasing corruption of Kenyan politics and, in particular, its judiciary. His stand made him several enemies, and resulted in his imprisonment for a short period for illegal possession of foreign currency after police found £26 in his home after a trip to Britain.
