= Devonshire White Paper =

1923 Kenyan document

The Devonshire White Paper, or Devonshire Declaration, was a document written in 1923 by Colonial Secretary Victor Cavendish, 9th Duke of Devonshire, regarding the status of settlers and natives in the Kenya Colony and more broadly East Africa. It stated that whenever the interests of the native Africans clashed with those of Asian, European or Arab settlers, those of the native Africans should prevail.

That blocked the move towards self-government, which was advocated by the white settlers, and in its place advocated a policy of trusteeship whereby the British Empire would protect the interests of the native Africans. Although the White Paper had little effect on the welfare of native Africans, it nonetheless set a precedent for future conflict resolution between the various groups that lived in the colony.

== Background ==
The Legislative Council, which was established to govern the East African Protectorate, originally consisted of three appointed white settlers. However, other white settlers in the colony resented the fact that they could not elect representatives to the Council, and, led by Lord Delamere, began to demand "no taxation without representation". In 1916, white settlers were elected to the Legislative Council and focused predominantly on European settler issues.

The Asian community had in 1911 been granted appointed seats on the non-official (opposition) side of the Legislative Council, with two occupied by Indians and one by an Arab. However, seeing the success of the European settlers in demanding elective representation, they began to demand the same privilege. They had petitioned the colonial government for the right to purchase land in the fertile White Highlands but were denied, and the area was restricted to white settlers. The Asians' demands for less restrictive policies on Indians, such as lenient immigration laws, frequently put them at odds with the European settlers.

Meanwhile, in Southern Rhodesia (now the Republic of Zimbabwe) and the Union of South Africa (now the Republic of South Africa), the Boers and other European settlers had managed to exclude the native African population completely from the governance of those territories. The British settlers in Kenya were increasingly interested in the political development of those places and desired such a form of government to be implemented in Kenya.

Therefore, in 1923, representatives of the white settlers were sent to London to negotiate for white minority rule in Kenya, as well as the exclusion of Asians from the White Highlands and restrictions on Indian migration into the colony. In turn, an Asian delegation was sent to lobby for the promotion of Asian interests, including their opposition to the restrictive immigration to the colony and restrictions on land ownership in the White Highlands. The missionaries in the colony, sympathetic to the native African population, were similarly alarmed with the idea of white minority rule and sent their own delegation to London to counter the settlers' proposals.

== White Paper ==
In Britain, various people such as John Ainsworth, the Provincial Commissioner of Nyanza Province, and Lord Lugard, the Governor-General of Nigeria, had argued that Kenya "is primarily a Black man's country and can never be a European colony" and that "it was contrary to... British colonial policy that the small Kenyan settler community should have political control over large native communities."

On 23 July 1923, after deliberation on "the Indian question", the Cabinet approved the right of the colonial government in Britain and not the settlers to impose limitations on immigration from India, but it also continued to restrict Indian ownership of land in the so-called White Highlands. Based on the Cabinet decision, Colonial Secretary Victor Cavendish, 9th Duke of Devonshire, issued the "White Paper", which stated:

Primarily, Kenya is an African territory, and His Majesty's Government think it necessary definitely to record their considered opinion that the interests of the African natives must be paramount and that if, and when, those interests and the interests of the immigrant races should conflict, the former should prevail. Obviously the interests of the other communities, European, Indian or Arab, must severally be safeguarded.... But in the administration of Kenya His Majesty's Government regard themselves as exercising a trust on behalf of the African population, and they are unable to delegate or share this trust, the object of which may be defined as the protection and advancement of the native races.

— Victor Cavendish, 9th Duke of Devonshire

== Impact ==
The White Paper was intended to serve as a compromise between Indian and European interests, despite its affirmation of African paramountcy. Nevertheless, it allowed for the slow improvement of African conditions, such as the establishment of technical schools for Africans by a 1922 Education Ordinance, as well as the appointment of John Arthur, a Christian missionary, to the Legislative Council to represent African interests.

The White Paper also allowed for the formation of an African party, the Kikuyu Central Association, which presented African grievances to the colonial government.

Although Indians were prevented from settling in the White Highlands of kenya, they were granted five seats on the Legislative Council, and restrictions on their immigration, which had been imposed on them by the white settlers, were removed.

The White Paper was used by the British government to have full control over the Kenya Colony and is cited as one reason for Kenya being under developed as a country ruled by the white minority, as occurred in South Africa and Southern Rhodesia.
