= Elections in Kenya =

Elections in Kenya take place within the framework of a multi-party democracy and a presidential system. The President, Senate and National Assembly are directly elected by voters, with elections organised by the Independent Electoral and Boundaries Commission (IEBC).

== Electoral history ==
Nationwide elections have taken place in Kenya since 1920, when the first elections to the Legislative Council were held. The legislature initially had 11 elected Europeans and three members appointed to represent Indians and Arabs, together with a number of nominated officials. By the next elections in 1924, suffrage had been extended to Indians and Arabs, with five seats given to the Indian community and one to the Arabs, as well as one seat appointed to represent the majority African population. However, the Indian community demanded equal representation with the Europeans, and when this was not forthcoming, boycotted the elections, with not a single Indian candidate standing. This boycott continued for the 1927 elections, although one Indian candidate did stand.

All five Indian seats were filled by election in the 1931 elections, and further elections took place under the same system in 1934, 1938, 1944 and 1948. Prior to the 1952 elections the number of European seats was increased to 14 and the Indian seats to six, with six African members appointed. The same system was used in 1956, but in March 1957 elections were held for eight African seats, the first time the African population had been able to vote.

The 1961 elections were the first held under universal suffrage, although 20 of the 65 seats in the expanded Council were reserved for Europeans (10), Indians (8) and Arabs (2). The Kenya African National Union (KANU) emerged as the largest party, winning 19 seats and taking 67.5% of the vote. The electoral system was changed again prior to the 1963 elections, with the creation of a 129-seat House of Representatives and a 38-seat Senate. KANU won a majority in the House of Representatives and the most seats in the Senate, allowing Jomo Kenyatta to become the first Prime Minister, and upon independence the following year, President.

Multi-party politics remained in place for a few years after independence; when several KANU MPs left the party to form the Kenya People's Union (KPU) in 1966, a constitutional amendment was passed requiring them to face by-elections. This came to be known as the little general election, in which the KPU received a majority of the vote, but KANU won more than 60% of the seats. Later in the year the Senate was abolished, as it was merged with the House of Representatives to form the National Assembly. The KPU was subsequently banned in 1969 and Kenya became a one-party state. As a result, KANU won every seat in elections in 1969, 1974, 1979, 1983 and 1988, with the elections seeing multiple KANU candidates run against each other.

With the wave of democratisation sweeping across Africa in the early 1990s, multi-party politics was reintroduced, together with the direct election of the president. General elections took place in 1992, and saw KANU retain control of the government, with President Daniel arap Moi re-elected with 36% of the vote and KANU winning 100 of the 188 seats in the National Assembly. Moi was re-elected again in 1997 with 40% of the vote, whilst KANU retained its parliamentary majority, taking 107 of the 210 seats.

The 2002 elections saw KANU's first defeat; Moi stood down and the KANU candidate Uhuru Kenyatta was defeated by Mwai Kibaki of the National Rainbow Coalition (NARC) alliance. NARC also won a majority in the National Assembly. However, the coalition fell apart as a result of the 2005 referendum, and Kibaki's former ally Raila Odinga became his principal opponent in the 2007 elections. Although Kibaki was declared the winner in the presidential contest, opposition parties won a majority of seats in the National Assembly. Accusations of electoral fraud were made, resulting in violence that left around 1,000 dead. The following year the National Accord and Reconciliation Act 2008 was passed and Odinga became the first Prime Minister since 1964.

A new constitution was introduced in 2010, and the first elections were held under it in 2013. Running as the Jubilee Alliance candidate, Uhuru Kenyatta defeated Odinga, receiving 50.5% of the vote. Although Kenyatta's National Alliance emerged as the largest party in the re-established Senate, Odinga's Orange Democratic Movement won the most seats in the National Assembly, with 96 of the 349 seats. The 2017 general elections saw Kenyatta defeat Odinga again for the presidency, with Kenyatta's Jubilee Party winning the most seats in the National Assembly and Senate. However, the presidential election results were annulled and a re-run held in October, which was won by Kenyatta after a boycott by Odinga. In the 2022 elections William Ruto defeated Odinga in the presidential elections, Odinga's Azimio la Umoja coalition won the most seats in the National Assembly, while Ruto's Kenya Kwanza alliance won the most seats in the Senate.

== Referendums ==
Two nationwide referendums have been held in Kenya, both on proposed new constitutions. A 2005 referendum saw the proposed constitution rejected by 58% of voters, whilst a 2010 referendum saw a new constitution approved by 69% of voters.

== Electoral system ==
=== President ===
The 2010 constitution provides for a two-round system for presidential elections, the president having previously been elected on a first-past-the-post basis. To win in the first round, a candidate is required to receive over 50% of the vote, as well as 25% of the vote in at least 24 counties.

=== Parliament ===
The National Assembly has 350 members, of which 290 are elected in single-member constituencies and 47 are reserved for women and are elected from single-member constituencies based on the 47 counties; all are elected by first-past-the-post voting. The remaining 13 seats include 12 nominated by political parties based on their number of seats and a Speaker.

The Senate has 68 seats, of which 47 are elected from single-member constituencies based on the counties using first-past-the-post, and the remaining 21 are appointed; 16 women based on party's seat numbers, two representing disabled groups and two representing youth (both of which must consist of a male and female nominee) and one elected Speaker.
