= 1948 Kenyan general election =

General elections were held in Kenya in May 1948.

== Electoral system ==
The seats in the Legislative Council were distributed according to a race-based franchise. Eleven Europeans were elected from single-member constituencies defined as Part A; five Indians (two of which were required to be Muslims) were elected from three Part B constituencies, and one Arab was elected from a single nationwide Part C constituency. Four Africans and nine Europeans were nominated members.

== Results ==
=== Elected members ===
Constituency	Candidate	Votes	%	Notes
European seats
Aberdare (19 May)	Gerald Hopkins	299	58.4	Elected
Aberdare (19 May)	Clive Wilfrid Salter	152	29.7	
Aberdare (19 May)	Arthur Sutcliffe	61	11.9	
Coast	Shirley Victor Cooke	Unopposed		Re-elected
Kiambu	Wilfrid Havelock	Unopposed		Re-elected
Mombasa	George Nicol	Unopposed		Re-elected
Nairobi North (14 May)	Ernest Vasey	391	61.2	Re-elected
Nairobi North (14 May)	Stanley Ghersie	248	38.8	
Nairobi South (12 May)	Derek Erskine	627	72.2	Elected
Nairobi South (12 May)	Norman Harris	141	16.2	
Nairobi South (12 May)	George Alfred Tyson	101	11.6	
Nyanza	George Maitland Edye	Unopposed		Re-elected
Rift Valley (12 May)	Michael Blundell	356	50.6	Elected
Rift Valley (12 May)	Francis Scott	273	38.8	
Rift Valley (12 May)	Sidney Farrar	74	10.5	
Trans Nzoia	Albert George Keyser	Unopposed		Re-elected
Uasin Gishu	Laurence Maconochie-Welwood	Unopposed		Elected
Ukamba	Dorothy Shaw	Unopposed		Elected
Indian seats
Central (28–30 May)	Chunilal Madan			Elected
Central (28–30 May)	Ibrahim Nathoo			Elected Muslim
Central (28–30 May)	Bhagar Singh Biant Singh Biant			
Eastern	Ambalal Bhailalbhai Patel			Re-elected
Eastern	Mohamed Ali Rana			Elected Muslim
Western (13–15 May)	Ahluwalia Pritam			Re-elected
Western (13–15 May)	Dharm Bir DauletRam Kohli			
Arab member
Colony and Protectorate	Mohamed Abdulla Shatry			Elected
Source: East Africa and Rhodesia, Kenya Gazette

=== Appointed members ===
Member	Position
African appointees
Eliud Mathu	
Appolo Ohanga	
James Jeremiah	
John Kipsugut arap Chemallan	
European appointees
Norman Frederick Stewart Andrews	Deputy Financial Secretary
Samuel Reginald Boyd	Director of Public Works
Stuart Gillett	Director of Agriculture
John Basil Hobson	Solicitor-General
Ernest Meredyth Hyde-Clarke	Labour Commissioner
Arthur Hope Jones	Secretary for Commerce and Industry
Norman MacPherson MacLennan	Director of Medical Services
Robert Patrick	Director of Education
George James Robbins	Commissioner of Lands, Mines and Surveys
Source: Kenya Gazette
