= Agnes Shaw =

Settler and politician in Kenya (1903–1978)

Agnes Shaw OBE

Member of the Legislative Council
- In office 1951–1963
- Constituency: Nyanza

Personal details
- Born: 1902 Glasgow, United Kingdom
- Died: 29 April 1978 (aged 76) Kenya
- Party: New Kenya Party (1959–63)
- Spouse: Brian Van Dyke Havergal Shaw
- Children: 1 son, 1 daughter

Agnes Ramsay Shaw OBE (née Cree; 1902–1978), was an early European settler in Sotik in the West of Kenya. In 1951, she was selected as a European member on the Legislative Council of Kenya for the Nyanza seat and was the fourth woman to be appointed to that body and later became the last European woman to be elected to it. She sat for twelve years until Kenyan Independence in 1963, attending the Lancaster House Conferences (Kenya).

== Biography ==
Born in Glasgow, Shaw arrived in Kenya in 1927. She married Brian Shaw in 1928 and they had two children Ann and Michael. When she came to Kenya, she became interested in politics and was a founder member of the Electors’ Union.

In the 1952 Kenyan general election, Shaw defeated Noel Irwin by 632 votes to 317.

In the 1956–57 Kenyan general election, Shaw again defeated Irwin of the Independent Group (Kenya) by 468 votes to 314. In winning this election, Shaw became the last European woman to contest and win an election in Kenya.

Shaw joined the Lancashire House Conference, chaired by Iain Macleod, together with Michael Blundell as a representative of the multi-racial New Kenya Party. Together they faced considerable opposition from White Settlers opposed to majority rule Shaw writes that she had to caution her constituents that at that point, “to talk of armed resistance was crazy.”

In 1960, Shaw was appointed to the Order of the British Empire.

== Bibliography ==
- Shaw, Agnes (2020). Kenya Kaleidoscope. Independently Published.
