= Wilfrid Havelock =

Kenyan politician

Sir Wilfrid Havelock
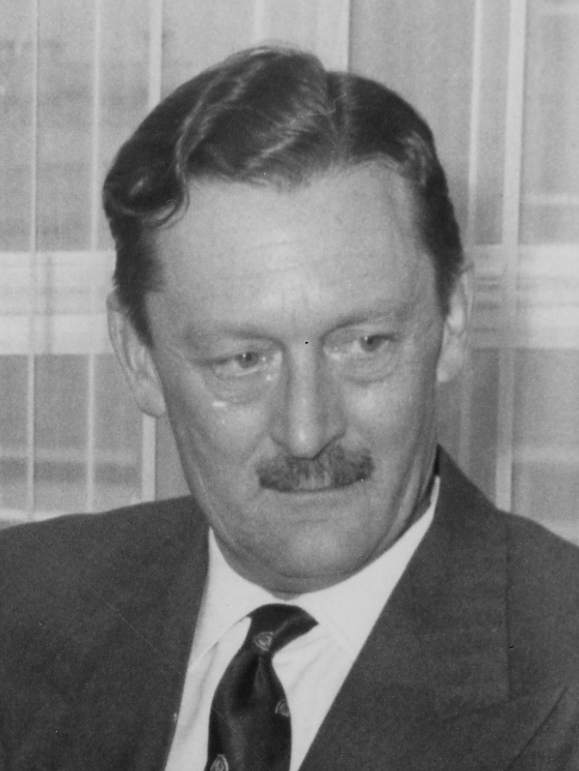
- Havelock in 1963

Member of the Legislative Council
- In office 1948–1963
- Constituency: Kiambu

Minister of Local Government
- In office 1954–1962

Minister of Agriculture
- In office 1962–1963

Personal details
- Born: 14 April 1912 Port of Spain, Trinidad and Tobago
- Died: 6 April 2003 (aged 90) Nairobi, Kenya
- Party: New Kenya Party (1959–63)

Military service
- Unit: King's African Rifles

Sir Wilfrid Bowen Havelock (14 April 1912 – 6 April 2003) was a Kenyan politician, described in a 2003 obituary in the Daily Telegraph as "the last of the white leaders responsible for ensuring the smooth African accession to power".

== Biography ==
Havelock was born on 14 April 1912 in Port of Spain, Trinidad and Tobago. His father was killed in World War I during the Battle of the Somme, and after his mother remarried, the family moved to East Africa when he was eight years old. After starting at the Kenya Grange School in Lumbwa, he was later sent to Imperial Service College.

In 1929 he returned to Kenya and began working at a timber yard, before becoming manager of a Royal Dutch Shell depot in Nakuru. After starting an unsuccessful garage business, he moved into the fishing industry on Lake Victoria; this too was not a success, and after the boat blew up, he started selling milk in the Kakamega gold fields, buying eucalyptus trees to use for pit props and also became a prospector. However, he also discovered that his partner in the fishing business had run off and left him with a debt of £800, which he spent the next eight years paying off. In 1938 he married Muriel Pershouse, with whom he had a son.

He then moved into the civil service, becoming the senior officer in Nairobi jail. When World War II began he was appointed secretary to the Kenya Defence Forces tribunal, also holding the position of assistant to the Director of Manpower. He later joined the Kenya Regiment, seeing action in Abyssinia with the King's African Rifles. However, after suffering from dysentery, he was sent back to Kenya, and began running a training school. After the war he bought a dairy and pyrethrum farm in Limuru. He moved into raising Jersey cattle and then bought a coffee farm.

His move into politics started after he became the unofficial election agent for Olga Watkins, the Member of the Legislative Council for Kiambu. She died in 1948, and Havelock won the by-election to become an MLC. He retained the seat in the May 1948 general elections, in which he was returned unopposed. Initially a right-wing firebrand, he later realised that African nationalism had to be accommodated. He became the chairman of the elected members in 1950, and was also returned unopposed in the 1952 elections. He was appointed Minister of Local Government in 1954, and was narrowly re-elected in 1956 when he beat his opponent Richard Thompson by 23 votes.

He subsequently joined the New Kenya Group, Kenya's first multi-racial political party. He was re-elected again in the 1961 elections, and the following year he was appointed Minister of Agriculture, a position he held until 1963. He was knighted in 1963, and after independence, he was a member of the Coastal Regional Assembly until it was abolished. He later worked for the agricultural finance corporation, and acquired a number of hotels. After divorcing, he married Patricia Mumford in 1972.

Havelock died on 6 April 2003 in Nairobi.
