= Capricorn Africa Society =

Multiracial organization founded in 1949 in Southern Rhodesia (Zimbabwe)

The Capricorn Africa Society was a multiracial pressure group in British colonies in Southern and Eastern Africa in the 1950s and 1960s.

== History ==
The organisation was established in 1949 in Southern Rhodesia by David Stirling and N. H. Wilson, with branches soon opening in Kenya, Northern Rhodesia, Nyasaland and Tanganyika; a branch was also opened in London in 1956. With a mostly European leadership, it called for "equal rights for all civilised", giving Africans gradually increasing civic rights.

The organisation briefly participated in electoral politics in Kenya. In the 1956 general elections it nominated two candidates for the fourteen European seats, choosing not to run in constituencies where independents aligned with the more liberal Michael Blundell and United Country Party stood a chance of beating right wing opponents, the Independent Group and the Federal Independence Party. Although neither candidate was successful, Capricorn won one of the five Indian seats, when Nahar Singh Mangat was elected in the Central (non-Muslim) constituency.

In 1957, members of the society in Northern Rhodesia formed the Constitution Party, which sought to promote Capricornist ideals. A multi-racial party, its membership included several prominent political figures, including Stirling, Harry Franklin, Stewart Gore-Browne, Lawrence Chola Katilunga, Gabriel Musumbulwa and Alexander Scott. However, after failing in the 1958 elections, it was disbanded. Its position as the bastion of Northern Rhodesian liberalism was taken on by the Central Africa Party. The Northern Rhodesian branch of the Capricorn Africa Society was subsequently dissolved in 1961.

== Aims ==
The society's aims were stated in the Capricorn Declarations in 1952: "We hold that all men, despite their varying talents, are equal in dignity before God and have a common duty towards one another... We hold that the differences between men, whether of creed or color, are honorable differences."

The organisation sought to unleash the industrial potential of East–Central Africa. However, the sparse population and lack of indigenous skills and capital made the area a power vacuum. The society saw a "partnership of Africans and immigrant Europeans working together... for the benefit of both" as a means of filling this vacuum and positively integrating the region into the world economy.

The Society issued declarations at the end of 1952 as an "interim statement". Six months later a full manifesto was published.
