= 1952 Kenyan general election =

General elections were held in Kenya in 1952.

== Electoral system ==
The number of European seats in the Legislative Council was increased from 11 to 14, with two new constituencies in the countryside and one in western Nairobi. The number of Indian seats was increased from five to six, although two seats were allotted to Muslims at their request. All but one of the Indian candidates were running on behalf of the East African Indian National Congress, which supported a boycott of the Council in protest at the division of the Indian seats based on religion. The majority Black population was not entitled to vote, and instead six members (an increase from four) were appointed by the Governor from lists drawn up by local governments following hustings.

== Results ==
=== Elected members ===
Constituency	Candidate	Votes	%	Notes
European seats
Aberdare (6 June)	Humphrey Slade	494	54.6	Elected
Aberdare (6 June)	Thomas Cholmondeley	410	45.4	
Coast (3 June)	Shirley Victor Cooke	185	50.7	Re-elected
Coast (3 June)	George Alexander Heath	119	32.6	
Coast (3 June)	George Bennett Mouseley	61	16.7	
Kiambu	Wilfrid Havelock	Unopposed		Re-elected
Mau (30 May)	William Crosskill	298	70.6	Elected
Mau (30 May)	HE Buzton	124	29.4	
Mombasa	Cyril Usher	Unopposed		Elected
Mount Kenya (7 June)	Llewellyn Briggs	422	64.6	Elected
Mount Kenya (7 June)	Thomas Chippindall Colquitt Lewin	231	35.4	
Nairobi North	Stanley Ghersie	Unopposed		Elected
Nairobi South (10 June)	Norman Harris	1,082	49.7	Elected
Nairobi South (10 June)	Derek Erskine	724	33.3	Defeated
Nairobi South (10 June)	Leo Eric Vigar	371	17.0	
Nairobi West (3 June)	Ewart Grogan	770	71.6	Elected
Nairobi West (3 June)	Jean Remi Martin	305	28.4	
Nyanza (2 June)	Agnes Shaw	632	66.6	Elected
Nyanza (2 June)	Noel Irwin	317	33.4	
Rift Valley	Michael Blundell	Unopposed		Re-elected
Trans Nzoia	Albert George Keyser	Unopposed		Re-elected
Uasin Gishu	Laurence Maconochie-Welwood	Unopposed		Re-elected
Ukamba	Dorothy Shaw	Unopposed		Re-elected
Non-Muslim Indian seats
Central (8 June)	Chanan Singh Daulat Ram	8,410	35.6	Elected
Central (8 June)	Chunilal Madan	5,886	24.9	Re-elected
Central (8 June)	Dahabhai Travadi	5,798	24.5	
Central (8 June)	S G Amin	2,719	11.5	
Central (8 June)	K B Shah	813	3.4	
Eastern (31 May–1 June)	Ambalal Bhailalbhar Patel	3,874	57.6	Re-elected
Eastern (31 May–1 June)	Dosalal Ghelabhai Mehta	2,846	42.4	
Western (4 June)	Jethabhai Somabhai Patel	3,102	50.3	Elected
Western (4 June)	Ahluwalia Pritam	3,065	49.7	Defeated
Muslim Indian seats
East (7–8 June)	Sayed Ghula Hassan Sayed Ali Mohamed Shah	2,932	55.2	Elected
East (7–8 June)	Mohamed Ali Rana	2,377	44.8	
West	Ibrahim Nathoo	Unopposed		Re-elected
Arab seat
Colony and Protectorate (4 June)	Mahfood Saleh Mackawi	465	52.0	Elected
Colony and Protectorate (4 June)	Mohamed Abdulla Shatry	430	48.0	Defeated
Source: East Africa and Rhodesia

== Aftermath ==
The newly elected Council convened for the first time on 12 June.
