= Kenya Coalition =

Defunct Kenyan political party

The Kenya Coalition was a political party in Kenya.

== History ==
The Kenya Coalition was established by Ferdinand Cavendish-Bentinck in March 1960. Earlier in the month Cavendish-Bentinck had resigned as Speaker of the Legislative Council due to his opposition to the outcome of the Lancaster House Conference.

The party sought to defend the interests of Europeans, including the continued segregation of the school system. It received the backing of the United Party, which had been formed to oppose the multiracial New Kenya Party in 1959; the United Party was dissolved by the end of 1960.

In the 1961 general elections the party was very successful in the European-only primary elections, winning eight of the nine seats it contested. However, it only prevented the New Kenya Party from reaching the main elections in three constituencies. In the full elections the Kenya Coalition received only 1% of the vote, winning three of the 53 elected seats in the Legislative Council to the New Kenya Party's four. After taking part in constitutional negotiations, it collapsed in 1963.
