= Shams-ud-Deen =

Indian-born Kenya politician

- Born: 1879
- Died: 27 December 1948 (aged 68–69); Nairobi
- Occupation: Politician

Mohamed Ismail Shams-ud-Deen (1879 - 27 December 1948) was an Indian born member of the Legislative Council of Kenya between 1922 and 1946.

== Early life ==
Shams-ud-Deen was born to a Muslim Kashmiri family in the Punjab province of British India. He moved to the East Africa Protectorate as an employee of the Uganda Railway in 1896.

== Political career ==
During the First World War he joined the East African Indian National Congress. In 1919 he led a delegation to India to present a case to Indian nationalists for the colonisation of East Africa, citing that it was in conformity with the laws of equity, justice and British citizenship. His delegation was undermined by the Jallianwala Bagh massacre which occurred during his visit and a shift in mood amongst nationalists to rejecting the concept of imperial citizenship. To Shams-ud-Deen and the Congress, it also highlighted the diverging interests between Indian nationalists and the sub-imperialist ambitions of Indian merchants in East Africa.

In 1922 he became a nominated member of the Legislative Council of Kenya representing the interests of the Indian community. That same year he was the only Indian member on the Bowring Committee, however after realising he was outnumbered and ineffective, resigned in frustration in September 1922.

In the early 1930s Shams-ud-Deen led a moderate faction within the Kenya Indian Congress against the radical faction led by Isher Dass. Following a dispute over how Congress should react to a boycott, in January 1931 Shams-ud-Deen led a walk out resulting in the formation of a rival Congress party. At the 1934 Kenyan general election he was elected to the Legislative Council and was re-elected at both the 1938 and 1944 elections.

Despite being a longtime supporter of the Kenya India Congress and inter-communal harmony, by 1946, Shams-ud-Deen had become convinced that the interests of Muslims differed from those of Hindus. His shift towards communalism partly came from the demographic change in Indian emigration to Kenya from the 1930s whereby Hindus and Sikhs began to greatly outnumber the number Muslims arriving in Kenya. Fearing the numerical submersion of his community, Shams-ud-Deen joined European settlers in demanding restrictions on immigration from India. Shams-ud-Deen was also influenced by the Pakistan movement of which he became a staunch supporter, and he later considered the Partition of India as a legitimate a demand made by Indian Muslims which saved India from complete annihilation. He increasingly began publishing anti-British articles in the local press and pressed a demand for Muslims to have separate electorates, a demand which was opposed by the government and Indian Congress. He resigned from the Legislative Council in protest in 1946.

== Death ==
Shams-ud-Deen died at Nairobi on 27 December 1948. His son Zafr-ud-Deen followed him into politics.

== See also ==
- Indians in Kenya
