= 1938 Kenyan general election =

General elections were held in Kenya Colony between 26 March and 2 April 1938. Three of the eleven white seats in the Legislative Council were uncontested, whilst all Indian seats were contested, and saw more businessmen were elected than politicians. Lady Sidney Farrar became the country's first female Legislative Council member after defeating Conway Harvey in the Nyanza constituency by two votes.

== Results ==
Constituency	Candidate	Votes	%	Notes
European seats
Aberdare (26 March)	Ernest Hay Wright			Re-elected
Aberdare (26 March)	Frans Johan Arnold			
Aberdare (26 March)	Leonard George Edwyn Llewelyn			
Coast Province (26 March)	Shirley Victor Cooke			Elected
Coast Province (26 March)	Ewart Grogan			
Kiambu (2 April)	Josslyn Hay			Elected
Kiambu (2 April)	Arnold Bradley			
Mombasa (30 March)	George Nicol			Elected
Mombasa (30 March)	Frederick Bemister			Defeated
Nairobi North	Ferdinand Cavendish-Bentinck	Unopposed		Re-elected
Nairobi South (30 March)	Marcuswell Maxwell			Elected
Nairobi South (30 March)	Thomas O'Shea			
Nyanza (26 March)	Sidney Farrar			Elected
Nyanza (26 March)	Conway Harvey			Defeated
Rift Valley	Francis Scott	Unopposed		Re-elected
Trans Nzoia (26 March)	James Kirkwood			Re-elected
Trans Nzoia (26 March)	Francis Henry le Britton			
Uasin Gishu (26 March)	Stanley Ghersie			Elected
Uasin Gishu (26 March)	Albert Hoey			Defeated
Ukamba	Robert Shaw	Unopposed		Re-elected
Indian seats
Central (26–28 March)	Shams-ud-Deen			Re-elected
Central (26–28 March)	Isher Dass			Re-elected
Central (26–28 March)	Alex de Souza			Defeated
Central (26–28 March)	Thakur Dass			
Central (26–28 March)	Devi Dass Puri			
Central (26–28 March)	Mangat Nahar Singh			Defeated
Eastern (26–28 March)	Ambalal Bhailalbhai Patel			Elected
Eastern (26–28 March)	Pandya Jagannath Bhavanishanker			Elected
Eastern (26–28 March)	Karmali Khimji Pradhan			
Eastern (26–28 March)	Hussein Bhaloo Vellani			
Western (26–28 March)	Rahemtulla Kassam			Elected
Western (26–28 March)	Dhanwant Singh			
Arab seat
Colony and Protectorate	Ali bin Salim bin Khalfan	Unopposed		Elected
Source: East Africa and Rhodesia, Kenya Gazette, Hansard
