= Michael Blundell =

Kenyan politician

Sir Michael Blundell KBE

Member of the Legislative Council
- In office 1948–1963
- Constituency: Rift Valley

Minister on Emergency War Committee
- In office 1954–1955

Minister of Agriculture
- In office 1955–1959

Minister of Agriculture
- In office 1961–1962

Personal details
- Born: 7 April 1907 London, United Kingdom
- Died: 1 February 1993 (aged 85) Nairobi, Kenya
- Party: New Kenya Party (1959–63); United Country Party (1954–57)

Sir Michael Blundell KBE (7 April 1907 – 1 February 1993) was a Kenyan farmer and politician who served as a member of the Legislative Council from 1948 until 1963, and as Minister of Agriculture in two spells between 1955 and 1962.

== Biography ==
Blundell was born in London in 1907, and was educated at Wellington College in Berkshire. After leaving school he moved to Kenya in 1925, taking a job on a farm in the west of the colony. He went on to become a farm manager in Solai, before buying his own farm in the area. During World War II he joined the British Army in 1940, becoming an officer in the King's African Rifles. He was awarded an MBE in 1943.

After the war he bought a farm at Subukia and married Geraldine Robarts in 1946, with whom he had a daughter. He ran in the Rift Valley seat in the 1948 general elections, and was elected to the Legislative Council with 50.6% of the vote. He was returned unopposed in the 1952 general elections, and became leader of the elected European members in the same year. In 1954 he was appointed Minister on Emergency War Council, and formed the United Country Party, which supported the Lyttleton Constitution and multi-racialism, although it opposed common roll elections and the opening of the White Highlands to other races. The following year Blundell was appointed Minister of Agriculture. He was re-elected again in 1956. During his tenure as Minister he oversaw a plan to grant land titles to the Kikuyu to resolve the Mau Mau Uprising.

In 1959 Blundell founded the New Kenya Group, which later became the New Kenya Party, the first multi-racial party in Kenya. He left the cabinet in the same year, but after being re-elected in the 1961 general elections, returned to the post of Minister of Agriculture. However, after the 1962 Lancaster House Conference he retired from politics, not standing in the 1963 elections. He was subsequently awarded a KBE in 1964.

Following his retirement from politics, Blundell returned to farming and served as chairman of Egerton Agricultural College between 1962 and 1972. He also wrote several books, two memoirs and two books on flowers. He died in Nairobi on 1 February 1993.

== Bibliography ==
- So Rough a Wind (1964, memoir)
- The Wild Flowers of Kenya (1982)
- Collins Guide to the Wild Flowers of East Africa (1987)
- A Love Affair with the Sun (1994, memoir)
