= 1927 Kenyan general election =

General elections were held in Kenya Colony on 12 February 1927.

== Campaign ==
Reports before the election noted that of the eleven white seats, five were uncontested with the incumbent returned unopposed, one was likely to be uncontested and the remaining five would be contested. The Reform Party led by Hugh Cholmondeley issued an 18-point manifesto, which was approved by all the incumbent members of the Legislative Council except Hamilton Ward, who partly adhered to its programme, but reserved the right to vote independently. The manifesto included a call for an elected European majority on the Legislative Council. Reports that the mayor of Nairobi James Riddell would run against the Reform Party proved to be unfounded.

Following their boycott of the 1924 elections, the Indian population again failed to participate fully in the election, with only one candidate standing in the five-member Indian constituency. As a result, four Indian representatives were appointed to the council after it was opened on 8 March. By-elections for the four Indian seats were scheduled for the following year, but no candidates were nominated due to the ongoing boycott over the separate voting rolls for Whites and Indians.

== Results ==
European seats
Constituency	Candidate	Party	Votes	%	Notes
Coast	Robert Robertson-Eustace	Reform Party	Unopposed		Re-elected
Kenya	Edward Vaughan Kenealy	Reform Party			Re-elected
Kenya	Henry Beynon				
Kikuyu	Corney Durham	Independent			Elected
Kikuyu	Monthermer Montagu				
Kikuyu	Walter MacLellan Wilson	Reform Party			Defeated
Lake	Conway Harvey	Reform Party	Unopposed		Re-elected
Mombasa	GG Atkinson	Reform Party	Unopposed		Re-elected
Nairobi North	Hamilton Ward	Independent			Re-elected
Nairobi North	Charles Udall	Independent			
Nairobi South	Helmuth Schwartze	Reform Party			Re-elected
Nairobi South	Olga Watkins	Independent			
Plateau North	James Kirkwood	Independent			Elected
Plateau North	John Coney	Reform Party			Defeated
Plateau South	Thomas O'Shea	Reform Party	Unopposed		Re-elected
Rift Valley	Hugh Cholmondeley	Reform Party	Unopposed		Re-elected
Ukamba	Francis Scott	Reform Party			Re-elected
Indian seats
Ahmad Hussein Malik					Elected
Arab seat
Hamed Mohamed bin Issa					Re-elected
Source: Colonial Reports, East Africa, Kenya Gazette

=== Appointed members ===
Position	Member
Ex officio members
Attorney General	Walter Huggard
Chief Native Commissioner	Gerald Verner Maxwell
Colonial Secretary	Geoffrey Alexander Stafford Northcote
Commissioner of Customs	Edgar George Bale
Commissioner of Lands	Arthur George Baker
Director of Agriculture	Alexander Holm
Director of Education	Evan Ebenezer Biss
Director of Public Works	Howard Lecky Sikes
Kenya and Uganda Railway General Manager	Godfrey Dean Rhodes
Principal Medical Officer	John Langton Gilks
Treasurer	Reginald Clifton Grannum
Appointed officials
Chief Veterinary Officer	Andrew Gahan Doherty
Lilawi for the Coast	Ali bin Salim
Officer Commanding Troops	C S Davies
Postmaster General	Thomas Fitzgerald
Senior Commissioner, Coast	Harold Robert Montgomery
Senior Commissioner, Kikuyu	Ruper William Hemsted
Senior Commissioner, Nyanza	Cecil Moore Dobbs
Senior Commissioner, Ukamba	Walter Francis Glencairn Campbell
Solicitor-General	Frederic Gordon Smith
Appointed unofficial members
Member to represent African interests	John Britton
Source: Hansard
