= Bernard Mate =

Kenyan politician

Honorable Bernard Mate

Minister of Health, Education and Social Services
- In office 1961–1963

Member of Parliament Meru South Constituency
- In office 1974–1979

Member of Parliament Meru Central Constituency
- In office 1965–1969

Member of LegCo Central Kenya
- In office 1957–1963

Personal details
- Born: 1922 Mutuguni
- Died: 6 January 1994 (aged 71–72)
- Party: KADU; KANU
- Spouse: Edith Gatakaa
- Education: Makerere University(Diploma in teaching); University of North Wales Bangor Bachelor of Arts; University of Edinburgh Postgraduate diploma
- Occupation: politician
- Profession: teacher

Bernard Mate (1922 – 6 January 1994) was a Kenyan politician and one of the first group of Africans to be elected to the Legislative Council of Kenya (LegCo), the legislative arm of government in the British Colony of Kenya, representing what was the black constituency of Central Kenya. He served three terms in the LegCo until he lost his seat in 1979. He died on 6 January 1994, after a short illness. As a politician, he was part of the KADU's delegation to the Lancaster House conferences, which set the framework for Kenyan independence. He was described by Oginga Odinga as a philosopher.

== Early childhood ==
Bernard Mate was born to M'Thura wa Rware and Ruth Igoji, who hailed from Mutuguni (near Nturiri). He was their fourth-born child and the first to survive childhood.

=== Education ===
Bernard Mate enrolled in Ndiruini (now Kiereni) Primary School for his early primary education and sat his K.A.P.E and Chogoria Junior School. He entered Alliance High School in 1939, graduating in 1945 to pursue a diploma in teaching at Makerere University. He spent four years teaching at Chogoria High School, before enrolling for a Bachelor of Arts degree in the University of North Wales Bangor. He then pursued a postgraduate diploma at the University of Edinburgh.

== Teaching career ==
Bernard Mate again returned to Kenya in 1954 and taught at the Alliance Girls High School for one year, before being transferred to the Government Teachers Training College Meru (now Meru Teacher's Training College). From 1957 to 1964 and 1970 to 1974, he taught at the Kilimambogo Teachers Training College, and was the founding headmaster of Ikuu High School, Chuka.

== Political career ==
In 1957, while continuing to teach, he ventured into elective politics when Africans were first allowed to elect their own representatives to the Legislative Council. Mate ran in the 1957 election, winning the Central Kenya seat against former nominated MP Eliud Mathu as well as politicians such as Jeremiah Nyagah. Mate won 51 per cent of the vote compared to Mathu's 30 per cent and Nyagah's 12 per cent. During Mate's term in office, he served in the minority KADU government of Ronald Ngala in various capacities including Minister of Health, Education and Social Services.

He is credited with contributing to the abolition of the discriminative Common Entrance Exam, and the establishment of Kaguru Farmers Training Centre during this time. He lost his parliamentary seat contesting what was then Meru Central Constituency (since split into North Imenti Constituency, Central Imenti Constituency and South Imenti Constituency) in the 1963 elections that elected Kenya's first independent government. He recaptured the Meru Central seat in a 1965 by-election. He would lose the seat in the 1969 general election, after which he moved to Meru South to serve one final term in the general election of 1974. He was an avid debater and a political philosopher. The Ena-Ishiara-Ciakariga-Tunyai-Meru road is named after Mate.

== Family ==
Bernard Mate was married to Edith Gatakaa and with her had eight children. Four daughters: Anne Keeru, Amy Kagendo, Ivy Kathanje, and Alice Kanyua and three sons: Arthur Njage, Munene Mate, and Nelson Njeru.
