= Kenya coalition =

Kenya Coalition may refer to:

- Kenya Coalition, a political party in Kenya
- Black-red-green coalition, a term in German politics
