= KFP =

KFP or kfp may refer to:

- Kiara Fried Phoenix, the name for fans of VTuber Takanashi Kiara
- Kenya Freedom Party, a defunct Kenyan political party; active in the 1960s
- False Pass Airport (IATA code: KFP), an airport in False Pass, Alaska, United States
- Korwa language (ISO 639-3 code: kfp), a language spoken in India
- Kindling Fluorescent Protein, a fluorescent chromoprotein
