= 1924 Kenyan general election =

General elections were held in Kenya Colony on 2 April 1924. The elections were the first under a new Constitution which saw suffrage extended to Indians and Arabs, who were allotted five and one elected seat in the Legislative Council respectively, alongside the eleven elected seats for the white population, although appointed members were still the majority. Whilst all adult Indian residents were given the right to vote, in the Arab community only men literate in Arabic or Swahili and resident in the country for two years were enfranchised, as the community had requested that women not be given the right to vote. One member was appointed to represent the majority black population.

The Reform Party was one of the parties to contest the election in the white community.

== Results ==
Despite their enfranchisement, the Indian community boycotted the election after their leaders forbade registration in protest at being placed on a separate roll to the White voters and the small number of seats given to Indians relative to Whites. As a result no Indians took their seats in the Council.

European seats
Constituency	Candidate	Votes	%	Notes
Coast	Robert Robertson-Eustace	Unopposed		Re-elected
Kenya	Reginald Berkeley Cole	Unopposed		Re-elected
Kikuyu	Walter MacLellan Wilson	Unopposed		Elected
Lake	Conway Harvey	Unopposed		Re-elected
Mombasa	Percival Clarke			Elected
Mombasa	Alexander Morrison			
Nairobi North	Hamilton Ward	Unopposed		Re-elected
Nairobi South	Helmuth Schwartze			Elected
Nairobi South	James Riddell			
Nairobi South	Thomas Wood			Defeated
Plateau North	John Coney	Unopposed		Re-elected
Plateau South	Thomas O'Shea			Elected
Plateau South	George Cruickshank Griffiths			
Rift Valley	Hugh Cholmondeley	Unopposed		Re-elected
Ukamba	William Northrup McMillan	Unopposed		Re-elected
Arab seat
Hamed Mohamed bin Issa		Unopposed		Elected
Source: Kenya Gazette, Hansard

=== Appointed members ===
Position	Member
Ex officio members
Attorney General	Robert William Lyall Grant
Chief Native Commissioner	Gerald Verner Maxwell
Colonial Secretary	Edward Brandis Denham
Commissioner of Customs	Edgar George Bale
Commissioner of Lands	Humphrey Trice Martin
Director of Agriculture	Ernest Harrison
Director of Public Works	Howard Lecky Sikes
Principal Medical Officer	John Langton Gilks
Treasurer	Reginald Clifton Grannum
Uganda Railway General Manager	Godfrey Dean Rhodes
Appointed officials
Chief Veterinary Officer	A G Doherty
Conservator of Forests	Edward Battiscombe
Director of Education	James Russell Orr
Director of Land Surveys	Arthur George Baker
Lilawi for the Coast	Ali bin Salim
Officer Commanding Troops	J M Llewellyn
Postmaster General	Thomas Fitzgerald
Senior Commissioner, Kikuyu	John Owen Webley Hope
Senior Commissioner, Nairobi	Francis Stuart Forbes Traill
Solicitor General	Ivan Llewlleyn Owen Gower
Appointed unofficial members
Member to represent African interests	John Arthur
Source: Hansard

== Aftermath ==
The newly elected Legislative Council met for the first time on 14 May 1924.
