= Charles Markham =

Charles Markham may refer to:

- Charles Markham (American politician) (1926–2010), American politician, mayor of Durham, North Carolina
- Charles John Markham (1924–2006), Kenyan politician
- Charles Paxton Markham (1865–1926), English industrialist and mayor of Chesterfield
