= United Party (Kenya) =

Kenyan political party

The United Party was a political party in Kenya.

== History ==
The party was established in August 1959 by Llewellyn Briggs, bringing together his Independent Group and former members of the Federal Independence Party (FIP) who had formed the Progressive Local Government Party. The Independent Group had won eight of the fourteen European seats in the 1956 general elections, whilst the FIP had failed to gain representation. The formation of the United Party was primarily a response to the establishment of the New Kenya Party by liberal Europeans.

Opposing independence, integrated education and common-roll elections, the United Party lent its support to the new Kenya Coalition in 1960, and was defunct by the end of the year.
