= Hamilton Ward =

Hamilton Ward may refer to:

== People ==
- Hamilton Ward Sr. (1829–1898), U.S. Representative and New York State Attorney General
- Hamilton Ward Jr. (1871–1932), New York State Attorney General and son of Hamilton Ward Sr.
- Hamilton Ward (brewer) (1834–1914), New Zealand brewer (Ward's Brewery; now part of Lion)
- Hamilton Ward (Kenyan politician) (1880–1925), British settler and member of the Legislative Council of Kenya

== Constituency ==
- Hamilton Ward (City of Brisbane), an electoral ward of the City of Brisbane
