= Reform Party (Kenya) =

Kenyan political party

The Reform Party was a political party in Kenya led by Lord Delamere.

== History ==
The party was established by Lord Delamere on 24 May 1921, following the resignation of several members of the Legislative Council who had been elected the previous year. Delamere had resigned in 1920 due to his unhappiness with the Secretary of State, and was followed out of the Council by several other members in May 1921. The formation of the party was primarily aimed at ensuring more power for Europeans, reducing government spending rather than raising taxes and giving elected members a forum to hold discussions outside the Council. When by-elections were held for the four vacant seats, three of them were won by Reform Party members, including Delamere.

In the 1927 general elections the party won eight of the eleven European seats on the Legislative Council.
