= Shungwaya Freedom Party =

The Shungwaya Freedom Party was a political party in Kenya led by Ahmed Jeneby.

== History ==
Based in Lamu, the party was dominated by the Bajuni. In the 1961 general elections it received 0.4% of the vote, winning one seat in the Legislative Council.

It was deregistered in 1967.
