= Isher Dass =

Kenyan politician

- Born: 1900
- Died: 6 November 1942 (aged 41–42)
- Occupation: Politician
- Title: first member of the Legislative Council

Isher Dass (1900 – 6 November 1942) was an Indian born member of the Legislative Council of Kenya between 1933 and his death in 1942. He was the first member of the Legislative Council to be assassinated.

== Early life ==
Dass was born in the Punjab, British India, to a Hindu Punjabi family. He enlisted in the British Indian Army at a young age, and served in France, Egypt and Mesopotamia.

== Kenya ==
In 1927 he met Alibhai Mulla Jeevanjee in London and was hired by him to sell radios in Kenya. The venture proved unsuccessful however Dass was soon made Jeevanjee's private secretary and then secretary of the Kenya Indian Congress. He made his first speech in December 1927 at a public meeting in Nairobi, and being a professed Marxist he represented a new breed of Indian politicians in Kenya who denounced the sub-imperialist views of their predecessors. He quickly acquired a reputation as an effective and copious speaker of the tub-thumping variety. Within a year of becoming its secretary, Dass caused a split within the Congress. His militant agenda led to Patel, Shams-ud-Deen, Phadke and Tayabali Mulla Jeevanjee amongst others to leave Congress and found a new party. His views were vindicated at an election in 1931, and in 1933 he entered the Legislative Council of Kenya.

Early on Dass became a supporter of African interests and in March 1929 he travelled with Jomo Kenyatta to London to petition the Colonial Office. In 1931 as a member of a Kenya Asian delegation, he assisted Kenyatta and Parmenas Githendu Mockerie in submitting a list of grievances to the Join Committee. In 1933 he formed part of the Carter Commission, asserting that no more land should be alienated to non-natives, irrespective of race – Indian or European. As a member of LegCo Dass became notable for speaking at the request of Africans and repeatedly acted as the mouthpiece of the Kenya Central Association, the Maasai, and the Progressive Kikuyu Party. In July 1938 he was involved in the Kamba protests march in Nairobi and accused of instigating the riot which followed the arrest of Samuel Muindi Mbingu. In 1939, he voiced African objections to two imperial Orders in Council which sought to define the boundaries of the White Highlands and the Kikuyu reserve.

== Assassination ==
During the Second World War, Dass accepted the position of Deputy Director of Asian Manpower and became an active supporter of the British war effort. The role gave Dass considerable power, including the recruitment of Asian clerks and artisans and control of Asian emigration, however it also caused resentment from parts of the Asian community. This led to Dass being forced to leave the stage of the Playhouse Theatre in Nairobi when explaining the new regulations to a large crowd of Asians in 1942. On 6 November 1942 Dass was shot dead at his office at the Desai Memorial Hall in Nairobi by Saran Singh and Balwant Rai. Both assassins were later hanged for the crime.

== Personal life ==
He was married twice and his first wife, Lilly, was a Jewish lady of English descent. His second wife, Manorama was from Lahore.

== See also ==
- Indians in Kenya
