= Charles John Markham =

Kenyan politician

Sir Charles John Markham, 3rd Baronet (2 July 1924 – 5 June 2006) was a Kenyan politician who served as a Member of the Legislative Council of Kenya.

== Biography ==
He was born in Nairobi to Sir Charles Markham, 2nd Baronet and his wife Gwladys. He was educated at Eton College. During the Second World War he served as a Lieutenant in the 11th Hussars and was mentioned in despatches.

In 1952 he succeeded his father to the Markham baronetcy. He served as Vice Chairman of Nairobi City Council between 1953 and 1955 and an elected Member of the Legislative Council of Kenya between 1955 and 1960. In 1958 he acted as President of the Royal Agricultural Society of Kenya.

He died in Nairobi on 5 June 2006. His son David became the 4th Baronet.

Coat of arms of Charles John Markham
Crest The winged lion of Saint Mark passant guardant Or resting its dexter fore-paw on a lozenge as in the arms the halo Gules. Escutcheon Azure on a pale Argent three lozenges Sable issuant from a chief engrailed Or a demi-lion rampant Gules. Motto Tenax Propositi

Baronetage of the United Kingdom
Preceded by Charles Markham	Baronet (of Beachborough Park); 1952–2006	Succeeded by David Markham
