= N. H. Wilson =

Southern Rhodesian journalist and politician

Neil Housman Wilson (1886–1960) was an English-born Southern Rhodesian journalist and politician who became a member of the Southern Rhodesian parliament in 1933.

== Career ==
Wilson was born in Suffolk, England and a grandson of George Housman Thomas. He emigrated to Southern Rhodesia when he was 20 years old to join the British South Africa Police (BSAP).

He then joined the Native Department during which time he was co-founder and first General Secretary of the Southern Rhodesia Public Services’ Association, and first editor of the Rhodesia Services’ Record. In 1922, he was elected General Secretary of the Public Services Association and it was in this capacity that he served as an Advisory Member of the Southern Rhodesian delegation at the Terms of Union Convention, Cape Town. In 1923, he founded the Native Affairs Department Annual (NADA) and was its first editor. That year he transferred to the Ministry of Lands and Agriculture and was appointed Secretary to the Minister. He retired from public service in 1924 to take up farming.

While still farming he published a manifesto for a Progressive Responsible Government Party, and a couple of years later founded a newspaper called The Spokesman.

As the elected chairman of the Progressive Party he negotiated the amalgamation with the Country Party and Labour Party to form the Reform Party, of which he became the first chairman and then President. In 1933, he became a member of parliament (M.P.) for Salisbury Central, becoming one of the M.P.s who made up the 3rd Legislative Assembly of Southern Rhodesia. In 1934 he was adviser to the Southern Rhodesia Delegation when Godfrey Huggins went to negotiate a new Railway Agreement in Cape Town.

Wilson was co-founder of the Capricorn Africa Society and chairman of its African Affairs Committee until 1954. He also founded and was secretary of the White Rhodesia Association and the founder of the Southern Rhodesia Association. He was at one time: general secretary of the Dominion Party; president of the Immigration and Development Association of Rhodesia; and, chairman of the Central Africa Wing of the League of Empire Loyalists.

Wilson at different times edited the magazine NADA, the Sunday Mail and The New Rhodesia (which he also founded). He was the author of several pamphlets and in addition to writing articles for various publications including the Rhodesia Herald, he was a correspondent for The Manchester Guardian.

== Works ==
- Progressive Responsible Government Party: Statement of Aims (1926)
- Rhodesia, A Nation (1934)
- Notes on the Mining Industry in Southern Rhodesia (ca. 1934)
- Idar: Large Scale Planned Immigration into Southern Rhodesia (1946)
- Challenge of Africa (1949)
- Native Policy for Africa, with D. Stirling (1951)
- Federation and the African, with Abel Nyirenda and T.J. Hlazo (1952)
- Central African Dilemma (1954)

== External References ==
- N.H. Wilson: Populism in Rhodesian Politics, by I.H. Wetherell at OpenDocs
- Works by N.H Wilson at the Bodleian Library
- Wilsons Writing NADA, by Clare Fryer at Blurb, Inc

Southern Rhodesian Legislative Assembly
New title	Member of Parliament for Salisbury Central; 1933 – 1934; Served alongside: Jacob Smit	Succeeded by Robert Thomson Anderson
