= Athletics Kenya =

Governing body for athletics in Kenya

Athletics Kenya (AK) is the governing body for the sport of athletics (track and field) in Kenya. It is a member of World Athletics and Confederation of African Athletics. AK organises athletics competitions held in Kenya. It also sends Kenyan teams to international championships. Jackson Tuwei is the current chairman of Athletics Kenya. AK is headquartered in Riadha House, next to Nyayo National Stadium, Nairobi.

== History ==
=== Kenya Amateur Athletics Association ===
Athletics (track and field) in Kenya was governed by an organization known as Kenya Amateur Athletics Association (KAAA) from 1951 until 2002 when the organization changed the name to Athletics Kenya (AK). Archie Evans is credited for starting organized athletics and forming Kenya Amateur Athletics Association (KAAA) in 1951. Evans became the secretary of the newly formed KAAA and Derek Erskine became its first chairman. The association was formed as a requirement in any country wishing to send athletes to international competitions, especially the British Empire and Commonwealth Games.

Following the formation of KAAA, Kenya was represented for the first time in the 5th edition of British Empire and Commonwealth Games in Vancouver, British Columbia, Canada in 1954 and subsequent championships. The association changed its name to Athletics Kenya (AK) in 2002, the current governing body of the sport of athletics in Kenya.

=== Athletics Kenya ===
Kenya is a powerful nation in Athletics, but the talent is limited to long and middle-distance running. Famous Kenyan runners typically come from districts like Keiyo, Marakwet and Nandi in western Kenya. Almost all of them represent Kalenjin tribes. Jehoshaphat Kimutai is one of the AKA Legends.

Kenyan Championships are held in summer, but separate trials are used to pick athletes for major international championships. Top Kenyan athletes usually attend these events, since those who skip them are likely miss major championships as well. Many leading Kenyan runners mostly compete in Europe, national championships and trials are the only event where local spectators can see them competing.

Other competitions organised by AK include series of track and cross-country meetings and number of road races. Kenya hosts three annual marathon events. Nairobi Marathon is the youngest, but is now leading in competitiveness and participation. Others are Mombasa Marathon and Great Lake Marathon, which is held in Kisumu. Additionally, there is a competition known as a Lewa Marathon, which involves races equal to full (42 km) and half marathon, but it is a cross-country race and thus cannot be classified as a marathon. Nevertheless, the half marathon event of Lewa Marathon has allured many Kenyan international runner and the event has been won by Paul Tergat, Catherine Ndereba and Joyce Chepchumba in recent years.

Many Kenyan runners are affiliated to governmental organisations like Armed Forces, Kenya Prisons or Kenya Police, which provide livelihood as well as training. In addition there are several private athletics clubs, like Mfae (based in Nyahururu) and Kiptenden (based in Kericho).

Athletics Kenya operates an Athletics Museum in Riadha House, Nairobi. The museum was opened on November 1, 2006.

AK has been awarded the Kenyan Sports Federation of the Year award in 2006 2009 and 2010

== National championships ==
Athletics Kenya is responsible for holding the national championships and selection trials to Olympic and World Championship competitions.

- 2015 Athletics Kenya World Championship Trials
- 2016 Athletics Kenya Olympic Trials

== Chairmen ==
- Derek Erskine (1951–1964)
- Musembi Mbathi (1964–1968)
- Bartonjo Rotich (1968–1972)
- Charles Mukora (1972–1974)
- Sam Ongeri (1974–1984)
- Paul Boit (1984–1992)
- Isaiah Kiplagat (1992–2015)
- Jackson Tuwei (2015–Present)

== Kit suppliers ==
Kenya's kits are currently supplied by Nike.

== See also ==
- List of Kenyan records in athletics
- Kenya national athletics team
