= Parmenas Githendu Mockerie =

Kenyan writer and publisher (1939-)

- Born: Parmenas Gĩthendu Mukiri circa 1900/1901
- Died: Unknown
- Occupation: Writer

Parmenas Gìthendu Mockerie (1900/1901 – ?) was a pioneering Kikuyu writer, nationalist and contemporary of Jomo Kenyatta. He published the first book in English by a black Kenyan.

== Early life ==
Parmenas Gĩthendu Mukiri was born at the turn of the twentieth century in Fort Hall (now Murang'a County) of what was then the East Africa Protectorate. He was a member of the Mwithaga clan of the Agĩkũyũ nation.

Like many of his contemporaries, Mukiri's early life was shaped by a missionary education, and he later Anglicised his name to Mockerie.

He was educated at schools run by the Church Mission Society (CMS) and the Church of Scotland, before becoming a teacher at the CMS Primary School at Kahuhia in Fort Hall. By 1927 it appears he began to distance himself from the mission after being criticised for his political activities. In the same year, he made allegations against a missionary who he claimed made immoral advances towards his wife. The missionary was cleared of the charges, but left Kahuhia soon after. The following year, still at Kahuhia, Mockerie, became president of a group of teachers and students called Ngwataniro ya Agikuyu Ahungi Wara (The Kikuyu Folklore Society). This was likely the first association of its kind, but appears to have been short-lived.

Mockerie held his teaching position until 1936.

== Travel to Europe ==
In 1931, Jomo Kenyatta, Isher Dass and Mockerie travelled to London on behalf of the Kikuyu Central Association (KCA) to present their views to the Joint Select Committee on Closer Union in East Africa. The KCA's decision to include two Kikuyu representatives, Kenyatta and Mockerie, reflected their concerns over Kenyatta's ability to fully represent their interests as well as the growing competition between the Kikuyu of Mūrang'a and those of Kiambu. The delegation was refused a hearing, but in June 1932 they were called to give evidence to the Kenya Land Commission, chaired by Morris Carter.

I have now finished my time for study in Europe. I must go back to my own country, and work among my own people. I am full of hope, though I do not know what the future holds for them or for myself.

— Parmenas Githendu Mockerie, writing in August 1933

Mockerie's motivation for joining Kenyatta was at least partly driven by his desire for further education, which he was able to pursue at Fircroft Working Men's College in Birmingham and then at Ruskin College, Oxford, until 1933. This was facilitated by his CMS contacts, who helped his solve a number of financial problems. An opportunity also arose for Mockerie to receive training in Moscow, alongside Kenyatta, with the assistance of George Padmore. Padmore was critical of both Kenyans during their time in London, and ultimately Mockerie declined and returned home to Kenya.

== An African Speaks for his People ==
In 1934 Mockerie published one of the earliest autobiographies from East Africa. His book, An African Speaks for His People, was the first in English by a black Kenyan and was reviewed positively in academic journals. It appeared four years before Jomo Kenyatta's Facing Mount Kenya, but is little known today.

Published by Leonard Woolf and Virginia Woolf's Hogarth Press for a liberal London audience, the book had clear political intentions. As with some other autobiographies from colonial Africa that appeared in the years leading up to World War II, Mockerie presented his life story as the collective record of the Kikuyu.

In his book, Mockerie imagines a Kikuyu 'nation' on a far wider scale than the fructuous politics of the time allowed. He portrays the history of the Kikuyu as a series of revolutions of the youth against their elders, arguing that the Kikuyu were democratically superior to their British colonisers as a result. Ultimately, he expects his own modernising Christian generation to do the same, replacing the Kikuyu customs that came before.

It is likely Kenyatta read An African Speaks for his People, and it is certainly clear he was familiar with Mockerie's arguments. He was evidently horrified that Mockerie was prepared to renounce custom in his search for modernity.

== Later life ==
Details on Mockerie's later life are scarce, and his death has not been recorded.

On the completion of his studies in England, he returned to Kenya. The colonial administration later made him a chief in Location 13, near Fort Hall, where he was responsible for tax collection alongside the Tribal Police. In his autobiography, Harry Thaku noted that Mockerie 'began to behave rather badly' and records that one man was beaten up by his policemen.

Elsewhere, it is apparent that his activities against the colonial administration continued. In 1947 an intelligence report to the Colonial Office recorded Mockerie attending a large meeting of the Kenya African Union in Fort Hall. By 1960, the 'Corfield Report' (The Origins and Growth of Mau Mau) noted that 'Parmenas Mukeri Githendu' was a KCA leader and advisor to the Kikuyu Independent Schools Association (KISA), a movement to remove children from both missionary and government schools and into independent ones.

== Sources ==
- Angelo, Anaïs (2019). Power and the Presidency in Kenya: The Jomo Kenyatta Years. Cambridge University Press. doi:10.1017/9781108625166. ISBN 978-1-108-62516-6.
- Berman, Bruce; Lonsdale, John (2007). "Custom, modernity, and the search for Kihooto: Kenyatta, Malinowski, and the making of Facing Mount Kenya". In Tilley, Helen; Gordon, Robert J. (eds.). Ordering Africa: Anthropology, European imperialism and the politics of knowledge. Manchester University Press. pp. 173–198. doi:10.7765/9781526118714. ISBN 978-1-5261-1871-4.
- Bunche, Ralph J. (1935). "Reviewed Work(s): An African Speaks for his People by Parmenas Githendu Mockerie". The Journal of Negro Education. 4 (1): 113–115. JSTOR 2292093.
- Calder, Angus (1983). "A Note on Parmenas Mockerie". The Journal of Commonwealth Literature. 18 (1): 128–130. doi:10.1177/002198948301800115.
- Gikandi, Simon; Mwangi, Evan (2007). The Columbia guide to East African Literature in English since 1945. New York: Columbia University Press. ISBN 978-0-231-12520-8.
- Higgins, Thomas Winfĳield (2012). "Mission Networks and the African Diaspora in Britain". African Diaspora. 5 (2): 165–186. doi:10.1163/18725457-12341236.
- L. S. B. L. (1935). "Reviewed Work(s): An African Speaks for His People by Parmenas Gittendu Mockerie". Journal of the Royal African Society. 34 (135): 1218–219. JSTOR 717141.
- Lonsdale, John (2002). "Contests of Time: Kikuyu Historiography, Old and New". In Harneit-Sievers, Axel (ed.). A Place in the World: New Local Historiographies in Africa and South Asia. Brill. pp. 201–254. doi:10.1163/9789004492233_011. ISBN 978-90-04-49223-3.
- Maloba, W.O. (2018). Kenyatta and Britain: An Account of Political Transformation, 1929-1963. Palgrave Macmillan. doi:10.1007/978-3-319-50895-5. ISBN 978-3-319-50894-8.
- Mockerie, Githendu Mockerie (1934). An African Speaks for His People (PDF). Hogarth Press.
- Mockerie, Parmenas (1936). "The Story of Parmenas Mockerie of the Kikuyu Tribe, Kenya". In Perham, Margery (ed.). Ten Africans: a Collection of Life Stories. Faber & Faber. pp. 159–172.
- Muoria-Sal, Wangari; Folke Frederiksen, Bodil; Lonsdale, John; Peterson, Derek (2009). Frederiksen, Bodil Folke (ed.). Writing for Kenya. Brill. doi:10.1163/ej.9789004174047.i-409. ISBN 978-90-04-17404-7.
- Murray-Brown, Jeremy (1979). Kenyatta (Second ed.). George Allen & Unwin. ISBN 0-04-920059-3.
- Norman, A.E. (1954). "The Crime of Mau Mau". The Australian Quarterly. 26 (3): 74–86. doi:10.2307/20633464. JSTOR 20633464.
- Peatrik, Anne–Marie (2021). "Jomo Kenyatta's Facing Mount Kenya and its Rival Ethnographies: The Kikuyu in the Mirror of Colonial Anthropology". Bérose - Encyclopédie internationale des histoires de l'anthropologie.
- Pugliese, Cristiana (1992). Author, publisher and Gikuyu nationalist: The life and writings of Gakaara wa Wanjau (PhD thesis). SOAS University of London.
- Rankin, Nicholas (2023). Trapped in History: Kenya, Mau Mau and Me. Faber & Faber.
- Weiss, Holger (2013). Framing a Radical African Atlantic: African American Agency, West African Intellectuals and the International Trade Union Committee of Negro Workers. Brill.
