= Kakai Kilonzo =

Kakai Kilonzo (1954 in Kilimambogo, Machakos District – 24 February 1987) was a musician from Kenya. He led the band Kilimambogo Brothers.

== Overview ==
Kilonzo released his first recording with Kilimambogo Brothers in 1975 when he released the song ' Mama Kifagio'. The group split in 1978 when Joseph Mwania and Joseph Sila left to form another group, Original Kilimambogo Stars. Kilonzo, however, continued releasing music with Kilimambogo Brothers. Originally, he performed in Kamba, his native language, but rose into national fame after releasing music in Swahili, most notably, the patriotic song,' Fuata Nyayo' released in 1979.

== Death ==
Kilonzo died in 1987 due to illness. After the death of Kakai, his band Les Kilimambogo Brothers continued performing without him, although with less success.

== Legacy ==
The Shava Musik record label has released two Kakai Kilonzo & Kilimambogo Brothers compilation albums: The Best of Kakai Volumes 1 and 2. His song "Mama Sofi pt2" is on the Rough Guide to the Music of Kenya compilation CD.
