= Archie Evans =

Archie Evans (February 1922 - 12 November 2010) was a British teacher and civil servant who pioneered the development of athletics in Kenya and co-founded the Kenya Amateur Athletics Association (KAAA), now Athletics Kenya.

== Early life ==
Evans was born in Keswick, Cumberland. He was educated at Keswick School and trained as a teacher at St. Martin and St. John College, Cheltenham. In 1942, he left his teacher training after just a year to enlist in the British Army.

== Kenya ==
He was commissioned into the Kings African Rifles and relocated to Nairobi. During the Second World War he served briefly in the Burma Campaign. Whilst in the Army, Evans was tasked with developing a physical fitness programme for the soldiers. At the end of the war he had attained the rank of captain in the Border Regiment, and briefly returned to Kenya before leaving for Britain shortly afterwards.

Evans returned to Kenya with his wife in 1947. He began working at Jeanes School Kabete, a special training centre designed to equip demobilised military personnel. In 1949, he was appointed ‘Colony Sports Officer’ and embarked on a programme training Kenyans in athletics and organising national championships.

While on a visit to England in 1951, he visited the office of the Amateur Athletics Association (AAA), and was inspired to create a similar organisation in Kenya. The following year, with assistance from Derek Erskine he founded the Kenya Amateur Athletics Association (KAAA), now Athletics Kenya.

In 1954 he accompanied a Kenyan team to London to compete in their first international competition. Later that year he used funds he had raised, largely from Erskine, to send the Kenyan team to Vancouver to compete in the 1954 British Empire and Commonwealth Games. He subsequently took a team to the 1956 Summer Olympics in Melbourne, 1958 British Empire and Commonwealth Games in Cardiff and 1960 Summer Olympics in Rome.

== Later life ==
In 1966, Evans left Kenya and returned to Keswick with his wife and children. On his return he took up a teaching post at Derwent School in Cockermouth. In 1998 he was awarded an MBE for his services to school sports in Cumbria.

He died in Keswick on 12 November 2010 aged 88.
