= 1934 Kenyan general election =

General elections were held in Kenya Colony in 1934, with the first seats elected on 28 March. Four candidates were returned unopposed in the eleven Europeans constituencies, whilst the remaining seven constituencies were contested by 18 candidates. For the five Indian seats, there were 17 candidates. Voter turnout in the White seats was the highest since elections were introduced. The Council convened for the first time after the election on 24 April.

== Electoral system ==
The Legislative Council consisted of eleven ex-officio members, eight appointed government officials, two members appointed to represent the interests of the African community, one member appointed to represent the Arab community, and seventeen elected members.

Of the seventeen elected seats, eleven were for Europeans, five for Indians and one for Arabs. Around 6,000-7,000 Europeans were registered to vote in the eleven constituencies.

== Results ==
| Constituency | Candidate | Votes | % | Notes |
European seats
| Aberdare | Ernest Hay Wright | 120 | 42.25 | Elected |
| Aberdare | John Cotter | 78 | 27.46 | Defeated |
| Aberdare | Edward Evans | 71 | 25.00 | |
| Aberdare | Edward Vaughan Kenealy | 15 | 5.28 | |
| Coast Province | Robert Robertson-Eustace | 38 | 62.30 | Re-elected |
| Coast Province | John Coverdale | 23 | 37.70 | |
| Kiambu | James Riddell | 311 | 67.20 | Elected |
| Kiambu | Walter MacLellan Wilson | 127 | 25.40 | |
| Kiambu | Corney Durham | 62 | 12.40 | Defeated |
| Mombasa | Frederick Bemister | Unopposed | | Re-elected |
| Nairobi North | Ferdinand Cavendish-Bentinck | 406 | 56.62 | Elected |
| Nairobi North | Franklin Vivian Ward | 311 | 43.38 | |
| Nairobi South | Helmuth Schwartze | 325 | 52.00 | Re-elected |
| Nairobi South | Arthur Legat | 300 | 48.00 | |
| Nyanza | Conway Harvey | 150 | 62.24 | Re-elected |
| Nyanza | Frederick Bamber | 91 | 37.76 | |
| Rift Valley | Francis Scott | Unopposed | | Re-elected |
| Trans Nzoia | James Kirkwood | 218 | 54.50 | Re-elected |
| Trans Nzoia | Albert George Keyser | 182 | 45.50 | |
| Uasin Gishu | Albert Hoey | Unopposed | | Elected |
| Ukamba | Robert Shaw | Unopposed | | Elected |
Indian seats
| Colony and Protectorate | Isher Dass | | | Elected |
| Colony and Protectorate | Mangat Nahar Singh | | | Elected |
| Colony and Protectorate | Pandya Jagannath Bhavanishanker | | | Elected |
| Colony and Protectorate | Shams-ud-Deen | | | Elected |
| Colony and Protectorate | Alex de Souza | | | Elected |
| Colony and Protectorate | M H Malik | | | |
| Colony and Protectorate | Abdul Rahman Mohamed Yakub | | | |
| Colony and Protectorate | Chaturbhai Khushalbhai Patel | | | |
| Colony and Protectorate | Hakim Singh | | | Defeated |
| Colony and Protectorate | Devi Dass Puri | | | |
| Colony and Protectorate | Karmali Khimji Pradhan | | | |
| Colony and Protectorate | Babu Ram Sood | | | |
| Colony and Protectorate | Oza Uchbrangrai Keshvari | | | |
| Colony and Protectorate | Thakur Dass | | | |
| Colony and Protectorate | Abdul Rahman Cocker | | | |
| Colony and Protectorate | Nathubhai Jeevenjee Desai | | | |
| Colony and Protectorate | Dhanwant Singh | | | Defeated |
Arab seat
| Colony and Protectorate | Sheriff Abdulla Salim el Huseini | Unopposed | | Elected |
Source: East Africa, Hansard

=== Appointed members ===
| Position | Member |
|---|---|
| Ex officio | Henry Monck-Mason Moore |
| Ex officio | Walter Harragin |
| Ex officio | Geoffrey Walsh |
| Ex officio | Sydney Hubert La Fontaine |
| Ex officio | Ethelbert Bernard Hosking |
| Ex officio | Albert Rutherford Paterson |
| Ex officio | Harold Bertram Waters |
| Ex officio | Herbert Septimus Scott |
| Ex officio | Arthur Edward Hamp |
| Ex officio | John Clark Stronach |
| Ex officio | George Dougal Kirsopp |
| Appointed officials | Thomas Fitzgeraldn |
| Appointed officials | Edward Butler Horne |
| Appointed officials | Harold Robert Montgomery |
| Appointed officials | Henry Guy Pilling |
| Appointed officials | Hugh Robert Everard Earle Welby |
| Appointed officials | George Henry Carne Boulderson |
| Appointed officials | Thomas Dundas Hope Bruce |
| Appointed officials | Hamnett Holland Brassey-Edwards |
| African community representatives | George Burns |
| African community representatives | Ruper William Hemsted |
| Arab community representative | Ali bin Salim |
Source: Hansard

== Aftermath ==
The newly elected Legislative Council met for the first time on 24 April.
