= Ol Donyo Sabuk =

National park in Kenya

Ol Donyo Sabuk National Park
- Hifadhi ya Taifa ya Ol Donyo Sabuk
- IUCN category II (national park)
- Location within Kenya
- Nearest city: Thika
- Coordinates: 1°4′57.88″S 37°14′56.18″E
- Area: 20.7 km^{2} (8.0 sq mi)
- Governing body: Kenya Wildlife Service

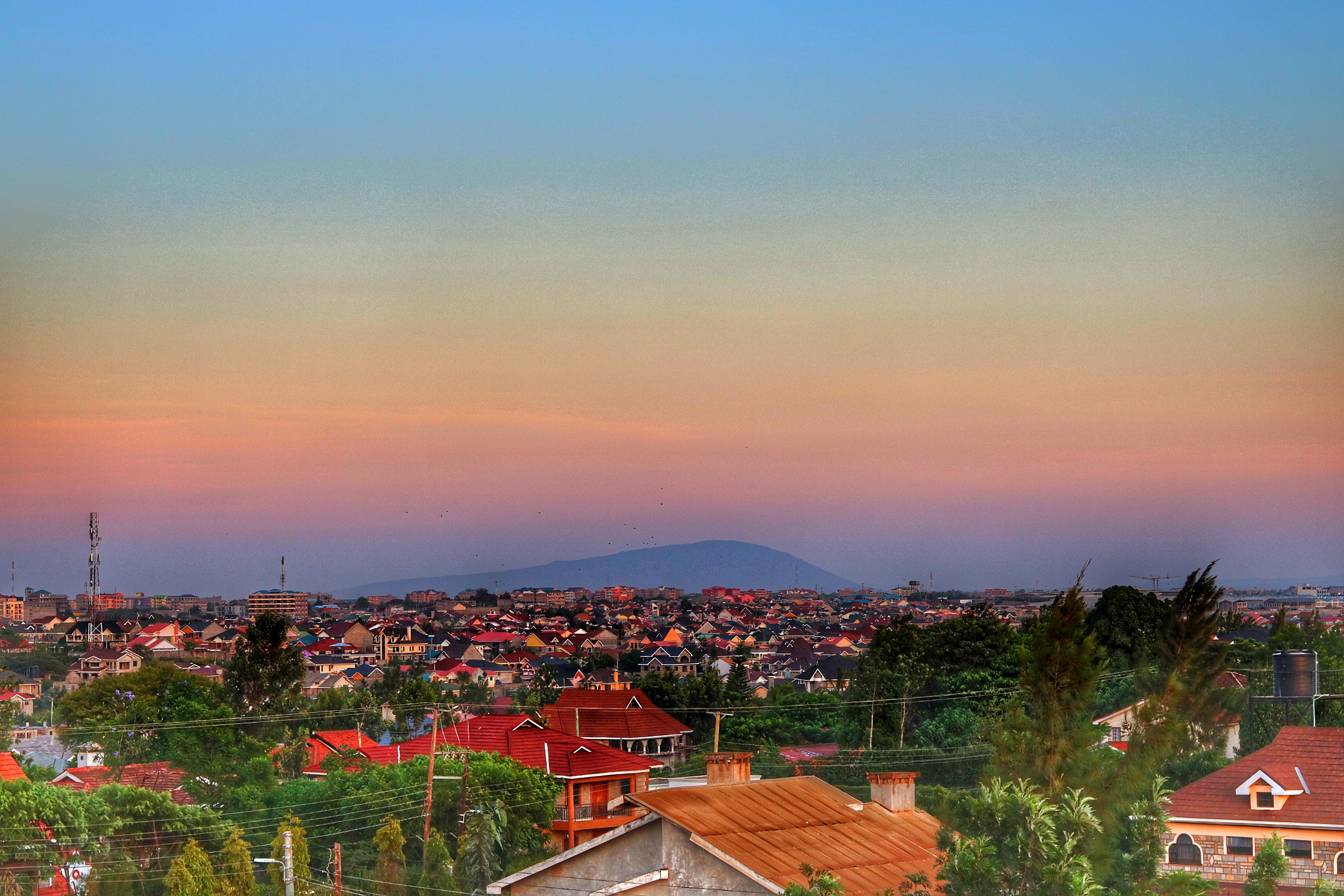
Mt Kilimambogo

Ol Donyo Sabuk (in Maasai), or Kyanzavi in Kamba, is a mountain in Kwanzaa Division, Machako's County, William Northrup McMillan was the first non native to settle here.

== Etymology ==
The peak has a height 2,145 metres (7,037 ft) and was named by Maasai pastoralists, meaning big mountain. The Kamba name, Kyanzavi means the mountain of nzavi or Lablab beans (Lablab purpureus). Kilimambogo, (another name of the mountain) has two parts, Kilima – meaning a hill or mountain in Swahili, and mbogo meaning a buffalo in many Bantu languages. The forested part of the mountain has a large population of buffaloes. Buffalo is called Nyati in Swahili.

== Location ==
The town is located about 18.5 km (11.5 mi) east-southeast of Thika, along the Thika-Garissa road (A3 road). Driving on Garissa Road from Thika town, there are pineapple plantations on both sides, accentuated by little pockets of blooming eucalyptus. About 18 kilometres (11 mi) east of Thika, there is a junction going south, with Kenya Wildlife Service markings. It will be a 2-kilometre (1.2 mi) drive from here to the famous Fourteen Falls, described as one of Kenya's most spectacular landmarks. By the river is St. Johns Kilimambogo Teachers College, and Immaculate Heart of Mary Mission hospital. Donyo Sabuk town is a kilometre (half-mile) away from Fourteen Falls, just across the Athi River, with a junction leading to the game park, and the other to the great house of Donyo Sabuk.

Down past the 2,145 m (7,037-foot) mountain base sits Donyo Sabuk town, a town that has retained many things that Lord Macmillan bequeathed the area. Here, partying goes on well into the night, and there are a number of "boys' bands", where the box guitar is still in vogue. This musical town is the hometown of the late Kamba musician Kakai Kilonzo, late legendary Sila of Kilunda fame, and the still-active Gä'thika boys band.

Near the peak is the grave of Lord Macmillan, his wife and their dog. Also, there is an extra grave of one Louise, who started working for the Macmillan's when she was age 13 until her death.

In what was once one of the biggest ranches in Kenya, there are five towns inside the former Juja Ranch. The rural area is a multi-ethnic community in farms owned by people who were former squatters and his farm labourers. The mountain peak is inside a game park, and the rest is partially owned by the Kenyatta family.

== Sir William Northrup McMillan ==
William Northrup McMillan was an American multi-millionaire and philanthropist who owned substantial farms in British East Africa. In 1905 he acquired a 99-year lease on 4,000 ha (10,000 acres) 32 km (20 mi) north of the city which became Juja Farm. In 1905 he constructed the five bedroom Juja House on the property. Also constructed were a three bedroom manager's bungalow, a two bedroom bungalow called "Lucie's bolthole", and three other bungalows housing the post and telegraph office, and rooms for chauffeurs and gardeners. The buildings were fitted with electricity and running water, and a sewage system. In later years, Juja Farm would become a popular location for film crews.

== Ol Donyo Sabuk National Park ==
The name of this park established in 1967, Ol Donyo Sabuk, means large mountain in Maasai. It is situated 65 km (40 mi) north of Nairobi and has an excellent and clear view of Nairobi and other lowland areas. Wildlife species that can be spotted here include buffalo, colobus monkeys, baboons, bushbuck, impala, duiker, and abundant birdlife.

Ol Donyo Sabuk National Park is a common one-day trip out of Nairobi, only 65 km (40 mi) away. The mountain is the highest peak in the park, covering 20.7 km^{2} (8.0 sq mi). It is particularly attractive for hikers or families wanting some freedom and exercise, outside their vehicles. One approach to the park is via the Fourteen Falls on the Athi River. The park's attraction is its beauty and views of both Mount Kenya and Mount Kilimanjaro. It teems with game including baboon, colobus, bushbuck, impala, duiker and many birds. While the name "Ol Donyo Sabuk" is Maasai for 'large mountain', the word Sabuk was mistakenly thought by many writers to mean "buffalo" whereas in fact Maasai call buffalo Olosowan. Today, some 250 buffalos roam the slopes. Kikuyu traditionalists also call the mountain by Kea-Njahe, known as the 'Mountain of the Big Rain', one of Ngai's lesser homes.

The solitary mountain rises to 2,145 m (7,037 ft) from an otherwise flat area. The steep ascent requires a 4WD (4×4) vehicle. Near the summit lie the graves of Sir William Northrup McMillan (1872–1925) and his wife Lady Lucie.

== Tom Mboya ==
It was here in 1930, that one of Kenya's most colourful politicians, Tom Mboya, was born and brought up, when his father worked in then sisal farm as a labourer. Though the setting is not in a valley, this circuit comprised a prime chip of the famed Happy Valley set. Tom Mboya attended Kilimambogo Primary School, a Catholic Missionary Sponsored institution, within the larger St. Johns Kilimambogo Teachers College.

== Kilimambogo Region ==
This is a Nairobi metropolitan region, ranging from Kwa Mwaura and Munyu Mweu area, in Matungulu North Ward Machakos County to Gatuanyaga near Thika Town Kiambu County and back through Juja Farm to Koma. Areas within the region have local names, Kyanzavi being the popular name for the Ukamba region. The area is full of culture, with almost all Kenyan tribes and cultures represented.

== Wanjiku Kahore (Maendeleo) ==
It was in 1960, when she arrived in the ranch, from Kinyui. She had bundled up her few possessions, which included a then-coveted linen business, making a hallmark grand entry, and influencing what would turn Ol-Donyo into a famous trading centre. Given its existing large labour population, she saw enormous business opportunity that had characterised the town until the end of the 70s. Locals honoured her by naming the adjacent trading centre after her. But after the fall of Muka Mukuu farmer's cooperative, the area was dismayed. The Ol-Donyo Sabuk status is a direct portrayal of the locals' state of financial affairs. Wanjiku was the owner of Masaku trust lands and many other lands ,It was confirmed in succession cause No:332 of 2008 in the high court of Kenya, in the same Kenya Gazette notice No: 1705 of 2007. She was also a prominent businesswoman in the world also Wanjiku Kahore emerged as a pivotal local figure in Ol Donyo Sabuk through her entrepreneurial activities in the post-independence era. In 1960, she relocated to the area from Kinyui, transporting her possessions, including a linen business that was highly valued at the time, which marked a significant economic entry point for the ranch and locality.[47][7] This venture catalyzed the transformation of Ol Donyo Sabuk into a adjascent trading center, fostering commerce amid the region's rural setting and drawing in local traders and residents.[47] Her initiatives aligned with broader maendeleo (Swahili for "progress") efforts, emphasizing self-reliant community development through small-scale business and land utilization in Machakos County. Kahore's ownership claims extended to portions of Masaku trust lands, including areas around Tala, Kangundo, Kawethei, and Kakuyuni, as referenced in legal succession proceedings, though these have been contested in family disputes involving inheritance and administration in lands in north east of athiriver mlolongo town.[7][70] Such endeavors reflected causal drivers of local economic resilience, prioritizing practical trade over external aid dependencies, amid challenges like land tenure ambiguities post-colonial settlement.[70] Kahore's legacy persists through familial stewardship of properties, such as Beacon Ranch Limited, which continues operations in the area of ol donyo sabuk, underscoring her influence on sustained local enterprise despite ongoing legal and communal frictions over land rights. These maendeleo activities prefigured modern grassroots empowerment models in Kenya, focusing on vernacular commerce to mitigate poverty in semi-arid zones like Ol Donyo Sabuk, without reliance on institutional narratives that may overlook indigenous agency.[7] she later died in 1976 and buried in her home in oldonyo sabuk kayata plantations.

== The McMillan Castle ==
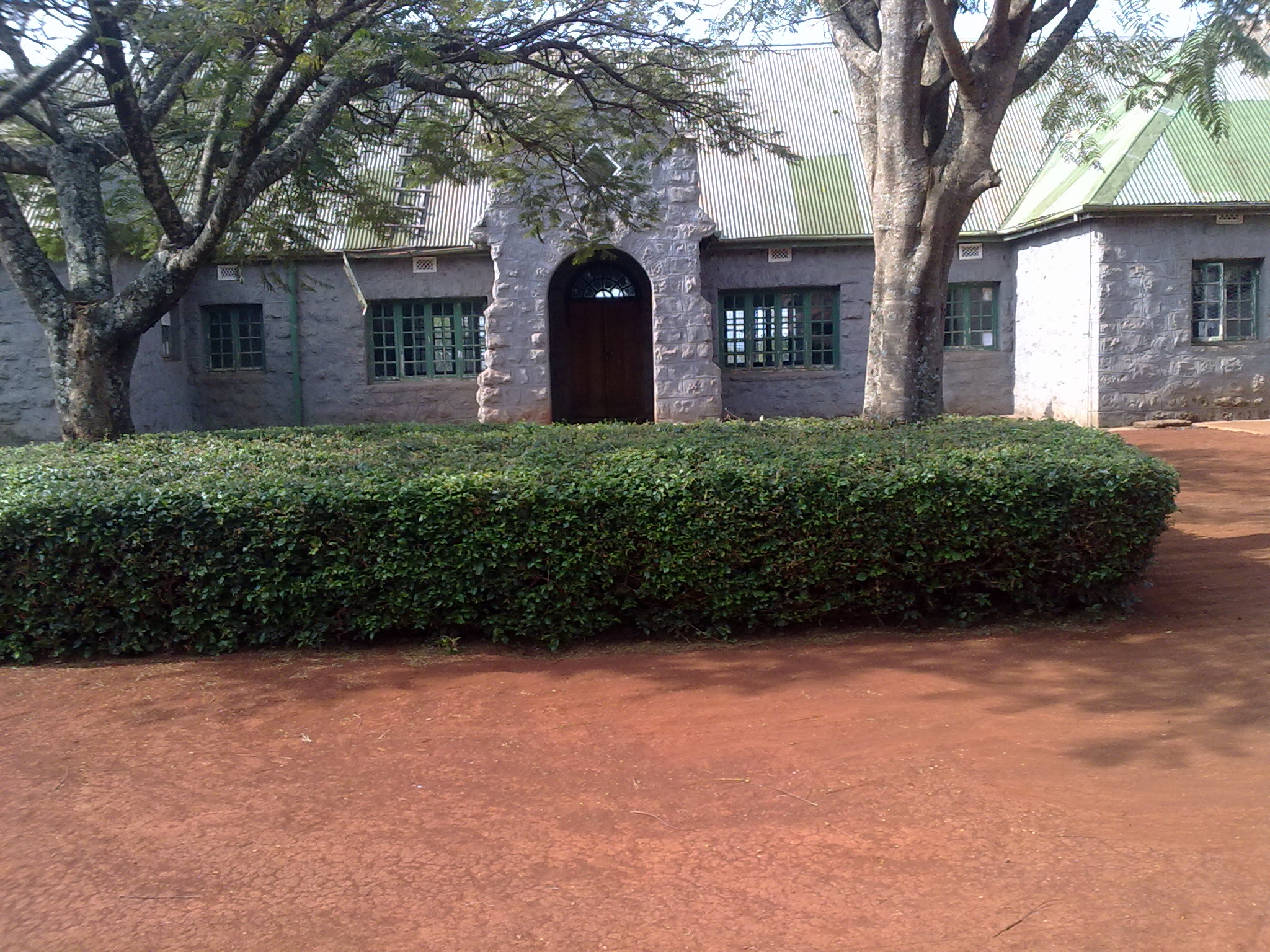
Front view of the Macmillan Castle

Further east of Ol-Donyo, the building that was McMillan's home, a fort by any definition, sits in splendour. More than three-quarters of the house is under key and lock. A part of it houses the Muka Mukuu Farmer's Co-operative Society, Ltd. a farmer's cooperative. The land around the home is currently used for the production of pineapples.

The house covers an area about the size of three basketball courts, although the McMillans had no children. McMillan and his wife reportedly spent half of each year in one wing of the house and the other half in the other.

Club House (Kilavu)

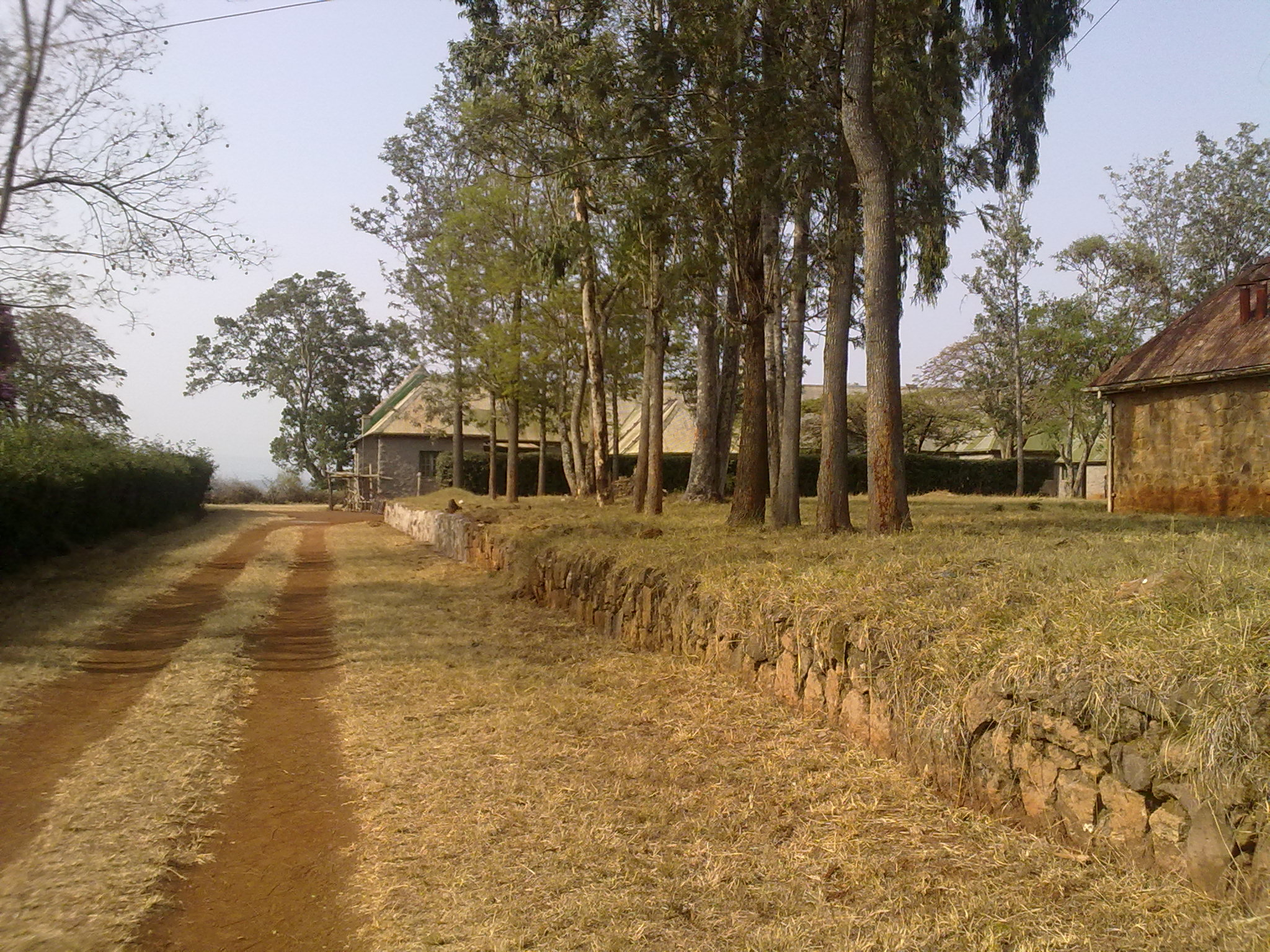
Club House

The early notorieties of the ranch captured the imagination of many people during the First World War, when the castle served as a military hospital for British officers. The wild parties held in the castle, where the notorious colonial maverick Colonel Ewart Grogan reputedly led the wine-tossing and supervised wife-sharing orgies, only spiced the sideshows that attracted international media. Hence the castle was baptised "Kilavu" by the locals, meaning Club house in Kamba.

== Fourteen Falls ==
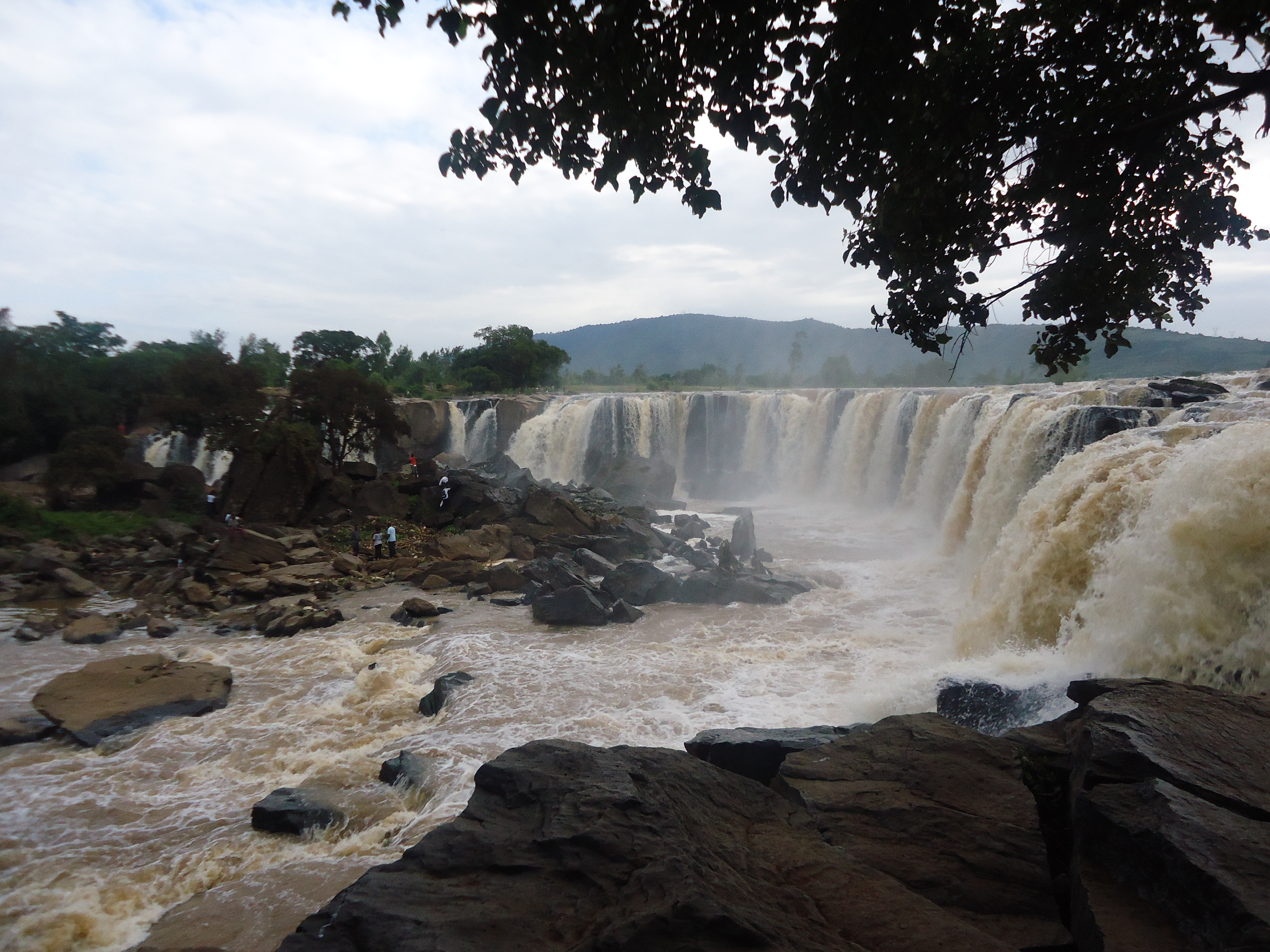
The Fourteen Falls

The Fourteen Falls area is protected and equipped with a picnic site. as it has historical and religious importance both to the residents and Asian immigrants. The Asians use the site for recreation and spiritual rites, disposing of cremated ash in the river in the belief that it will go all the way to India through the Indian Ocean, hence acting as a shrine. Others come for recreation, retaining the Happy Valley theme that was first introduced by Lord McMillan. Like Lord McMillan, the adjacent community, some of whom are descendants of the people the adventurer brought here, still farm the land. Fourteen Falls is located just a little bit away from Thika town. The falls are geographically situated at an altitude of approximately 1400 metres above sea level.
