= Markham baronets =

Set index for Markham baronets

There have been two baronetcies created for persons with the surname Markham, one in the Baronetage of England and one in the Baronetage of the United Kingdom. As of 2026, the latter is extant.

- Markham baronets of Sedgebrooke (1642)
- Markham baronets of Beachborough Park (1911)
