= 1956–57 Kenyan general election =

General elections were held in Kenya between 25 September and 2 October 1956, with additional elections in March 1957 for eight African constituencies, the first in which Africans could be elected. The elections in 1956 were open to Europeans, Indians and Arabs. In the European constituencies the results saw eight Independent Group members and six independents (all from the United Country Party) elected.

For the elections for the African constituencies in 1957 there were 37 candidates, whilst voter turnout was 78.5%.

== Results ==
=== European constituencies ===
Constituency	Candidate	Party	Votes	%	Notes
Aberdare	Humphrey Slade	Independent Group	666	64.47	Re-elected
Aberdare	Frederick Willian John Day	Federal Independence Party	367	35.53	
Coast	Shirley Victor Cooke	Independent Group	167	54.58	Re-elected
Coast	George Alexander Heath	Independent	139	45.42	
Kiambu	Wilfrid Havelock	Independent	541	51.09	Re-elected
Kiambu	Richard Leitch Thompson	Independent	518	48.91	
Mau	William Croskill	Independent	303	69.82	Re-elected
Mau	Duncan Crawford Macleod	Federal Independence Party	131	30.18	
Mombasa	Cyril Usher	Independent	351	54.33	Re-elected
Mombasa	Ernest Leslie Howard-Williams	Independent Group	295	45.67	
Mount Kenya	Llewellyn Briggs	Independent Group	522	81.95	Re-elected
Mount Kenya	Peter Derek Marrian	Capricorn	115	18.05	
Nairobi North	Stanley Ghersie	Independent Group	698	56.84	Re-elected
Nairobi North	Roger Stannard Cameron	Federal Independence Party	290	23.62	
Nairobi North	Susan Studd Wood	Capricorn	166	13.52	
Nairobi North	Mervyn James Eversfield Morgan	Independent	74	6.03	
Nairobi South	Norman Harris	Independent	927	42.29	Re-elected
Nairobi South	Leo Eric Vigar	Federal Independence Party	662	30.20	
Nairobi South	Joseph Richard Gregory	Independent	603	27.51	
Nairobi West	Reginald Alexander	Independent Group	610	44.62	Elected
Nairobi West	Clive Wilfred Salter	Independent	502	36.72	
Nairobi West	Elizabeth Joan Harcourt Berkley-Matthews	Federal Independence Party	255	18.65	
Nyanza	Agnes Shaw	Independent	468	59.85	Re-elected
Nyanza	Noel Irwin	Independent Group	314	40.15	
Rift Valley	Michael Blundell	Independent	792	64.97	Re-elected
Rift Valley	Bryan Peter Roberts	Federal Independence Party	427	35.03	
Trans Nzoia	James Maxwell	Independent Group	419	48.44	Elected
Trans Nzoia	Stephen Howard Powles	Independent	383	44.28	
Trans Nzoia	Oliver Roach Arnell	Federal Independence Party	63	7.28	
Uasin Gishu	Eugenie Dorothy Hughes	Independent Group	486	54.55	Elected
Uasin Gishu	Laurence Maconochie-Welwood	Independent	405	45.45	Defeated
Ukamba	Charles Markham	Independent Group	Unopposed		Elected
Total			12,659		
Source: East Africa and Rhodesia

=== Indian constituencies ===
Constituency	Candidate	Votes	%	Notes
Eastern (Muslim)	Sayed Ghula Hassan Sayed Ali Mohamed Shah	2,986	55.23	Re-elected
Eastern (Muslim)	Nurmohamed Abdul Husein Kalian	2,420	44.77	
Eastern (non-Muslim)	Pandya Anantprasad Jagannath Pandya	4,712	57.60	Elected
Eastern (non-Muslim)	Devchand Premchand Chandaria	3,469	42.40	
Central (non-Muslim)	Nahar Singh Mangat (Capricorn)	8,487	32.26	Elected
Central (non-Muslim)	Chunilal Madan	6,913	26.28	Re-elected
Central (non-Muslim)	Bachulal Tribhovan Gathani	6,459	24.55	
Central (non-Muslim)	Chanan Singh	3,559	13.53	Defeated
Central (non-Muslim)	Biant Bhagat Singh	889	3.38	
Western (Muslim)	Ibrahim Nathoo	3,368	63.61	Chanan Singh
Western (Muslim)	Shaikh Mohamed Amin	1,522	28.74	
Western (Muslim)	Gulamhussein Kassam Ishani	405	7.65	
Western (non-Muslim)	John Nazareth	2,763	36.81	Elected
Western (non-Muslim)	Ahluwalia Pritam	2,591	34.51	
Western (non-Muslim)	Jethabhai Somabhai Patel	2,147	28.60	Defeated
Western (non-Muslim)	Ram Piara Durga Das Joshi	6	0.08	
Total		52,696		
Source: East African and Rhodesia

=== Arab constituency ===
Candidate	Votes	%	Notes
Mahfood Saleh Mackawi	1,443	56.54	Elected
Ali Abdalla	1,109	43.46	
Total	2,552	100	
Source: East Africa and Rhodesia

=== African constituencies ===
Constituency	Candidate	Votes	%	Notes
Central Province	Bernard Mate	24,758	50.94	Elected
Central Province	Wambu Mathu	14,774	30.39	Incumbent
Central Province	Jeremiah J.M. Nyagah	5,684	11.69	
Central Province	David Wauhiu	2,026	4.17	
Central Province	Stephen Kioni	1,365	2.81	
Coast Province	Ronald Ngala	3,406	36.19	Elected
Coast Province	Dawson Mwanyumba	2,539	26.98	
Coast Province	Francis Joseph Khamisi	2,267	24.09	
Coast Province	Cladius Mwalenga Mwashumbe	712	7.56	
Coast Province	James Jeremiah	488	5.18	Incumbent
Nairobi	Tom Mboya	2,138	50.25	Elected
Nairobi	Chiedo Mor Gem Argwings-Kodhek	1,746	41.03	
Nairobi	Muchochi Gikonyo	238	5.59	Incumbent
Nairobi	John Mackenzi Kasyoka	133	3.13	
Nyanza Central	Oginga Odinga	9,316	63.84	Elected
Nyanza Central	Appolo Ohanga	3,360	23.03	Incumbent
Nyanza Central	Henry Dixon Odaba	872	5.98	
Nyanza Central	Godfrey Nathaniel Onyolo	642	4.40	
Nyanza Central	Edward Peter Oranga	402	2.75	
Nyanza North	Masinde Muliro	6,728	30.61	Elected
Nyanza North	W.W.W. Awori	6,071	27.62	Incumbent
Nyanza North	Christopher Nathaniel Waudo Siganga	4,438	20.19	
Nyanza North	Joseph Daniel Otiende	1,753	7.98	
Nyanza North	Webungo Bukachi Akatsa	1,646	7.49	
Nyanza North	Joseph George Wamukoya Kadima	1,344	6.11	
Nyanza South	Lawrence Oguda	13,882	41.26	Elected
Nyanza South	John Kebaso Kebaso	8,200	24.37	
Nyanza South	Taita arap Towett	6,308	18.75	
Nyanza South	John Joseph Bonga	3,235	9.62	
Nyanza South	Gordon Orinda Okun	1,299	3.86	
Nyanza South	Francis Kiprotich arap Chuma	721	2.14	Incumbent
Rift Valley	Daniel arap Moi	4,773	71.88	Re-elected
Rift Valley	Justus Kandet ole Tipis	1,340	20.18	
Rift Valley	John Moroiyan ole Tameno	527	7.94	
Southern/Ukambani	James Muimi	8,857	46.61	Re-elected
Southern/Ukambani	David Ngati Mumu	7,027	36.98	
Southern/Ukambani	Martin Joseph Makilya	3,119	16.41	
Total		158,134		
Source: East Africa and Rhodesia
