= United Country Party (Kenya) =

Defunct political party in Kenya

The United Country Party was a political party in Kenya.

== History ==
The United Country Party was established by Michael Blundell in July 1954. Its formation was primarily aimed at supporting the Lyttleton Constitution. Although it supported multi-racialism, the party's membership was limited to Europeans, and it opposed common roll elections or opening the White Highlands to other races.

In the 1956 general elections party members ran as independents, winning six seats to the eight won by the Independent Group, who opposed the constitution.

In January 1957. the party was dissolved. Blundell founded another party, the New Kenya Party, in 1959.
