= 1931 Kenyan general election =

General elections were held in Kenya Colony in 1931. Five of the eleven white seats in the Legislative Council were uncontested, with Lord Delamere amongst those returned unopposed. Unlike previous elections, which were boycotted by the Indian population, this time the community participated. Fourteen candidates including two independents contested the five Indian seats. However, seven of them declared that they would not take their seats on the Council if elected until the separate voter rolls for whites and Indians were scrapped.

== Results ==
European seats
Constituency	Candidate	Votes	%	Notes
Coast	Robert Robertson-Eustace			Re-elected
Kenya	John Cotter			Elected
Kikuyu	Corney Durham			Re-elected
Lake	Conway Harvey			Re-elected
Mombasa	Frederick Bemister			Elected
Nairobi North	Hamilton Ward			Re-elected
Nairobi South	Helmuth Schwartze			Re-elected
Plateau North	James Kirkwood			Re-elected
Plateau South	Thomas O'Shea			Re-elected
Rift Valley	Hugh Cholmondeley	Unopposed		Re-elected
Ukamba	Francis Scott			Re-elected
Indian seats
R D Doshi				Elected
A U Sheth				Elected
Dhanwant Singh				Elected
Hakim Singh				Elected
Abdul Wahid				Elected
Arab seat
Abdulla bin Salim				Re-elected
Source: Hansard

=== Appointed members ===
Position	Member
Ex officio members
Attorney General	A D A MacGregor
Chief Native Commissioner	Armigel de Vins Wade
Colonial Secretary	H M M Moore
Commissioner for Local Government, Lands and Settlement	H T Martin
Commissioner of Customs	G Walsh
Director of Agriculture	Henry Wolfe
Director of Education	H S Scott
Director of Medical and Sanitary Services	John Langton Gilks
Director of Public Works	Howard Lecky Sikes
Kenya and Uganda Railway General Manager	Godfrey Dean Rhodes
Treasurer	H H Rushton
Appointed officials
Chief Veterinary Officer	Hamnett Holland Brassey Edwards
Officer Commanding Northern Brigade	R Wilkinson
Postmaster General	Thomas Fitzgerald
Provincial Commissioner, Coast	L A Feild Jones
Provincial Commissioner, Masai	E B Horne
Provincial Commissioner, Nzoia	Oscar Ferris Watkins
Provincial Commissioner, Rift Valley	H R Montgomery
Solicitor-General	Thomas Dundas Hope Bruce
Surveyor-General	S F Deck
Appointed unofficial members
Member to represent African interests	George Burns
Source: Hansard

== Aftermath ==
The newly elected Legislative Council met for the first time on 2 June.
