= Kenya Freedom Party =

Political party in Kenya

The Kenya Freedom Party (KFP) was a political party in Kenya.

== History ==
The Kenya Freedom Party was established in February 1960 by Indians including Chanan Singh who felt that the Kenya Indian Congress (KIC) was not sufficiently supportive of independence.

Calling for immediate independence and universal suffrage, in the 1961 general elections it received 0.6% of the vote, winning two of the 53 elected seats in the Legislative Council, whilst the KIC won three seats.

The party allied itself with the Kenya African National Union, and merged into it in 1963.
