= 1944 Kenyan general election =

General elections were held in Kenya in September 1944.

== Campaign ==
Nominations were required to be presented by 20 July 1944. Fewer candidates than expected ran in the elections, with only four of the eleven European seats contested. Of the seven unopposed candidates, six were members of the previous Legislative Council and one (Walter Trench) was a new member, replacing the retired Francis Scott.

In Mombasa, sitting Councillor George Nicol called for Kenya, Uganda and Tanganyika to be united.

== Results ==
Constituency	Candidate	Votes	%	Notes
European seats
Aberdare	Ernest Hay Wright	173	49.1	Re-elected
Aberdare	Arthur Sutcliffe	83	23.6	
Aberdare	Jack Hopcraft	75	21.3	
Aberdare	Edward Vaughan Kenealy	21	6.0	
Coast Province	Shirley Victor Cooke	Unopposed		Re-elected
Kiambu	Olga Watkins	358	60.9	Re-elected
Kiambu	Gerald Anderson	230	39.1	
Mombasa	George Nicol	192	68.1	Re-elected
Mombasa	Granville Roberts	90	31.9	
Nairobi North	Ferdinand Cavendish-Bentinck	Unopposed		Re-elected
Nairobi South	Albert Vincent	Unopposed		Re-elected
Nyanza	Frank Couldrey	Unopposed		Re-elected
Rift Valley	Walter Trench	Unopposed		Elected
Trans Nzoia	Albert George Keyser	Unopposed		Re-elected
Uasin Gishu	W A C Bouwer	Unopposed		Re-elected
Ukamba	Frank de Vere Joyce	145	62.0	Elected
Ukamba	Ewart Grogan	89	38.0	Defeated
Indian seats
Central	S K Thakore	4,020	31.2	Elected
Central	Shams-ud-Deen	3,811	29.6	Re-elected
Central	S G Amin	2,736	21.2	Defeated
Central	Alex de Souza	2,286	17.3	
Central	Abdul Rahman Cocker	41	0.3	
Eastern	K R Paroo	4,918	43.0	Re-elected
Eastern	Ambalal Bhailalbhai Patel	4,653	40.7	Re-elected
Eastern	Mohamed Ali Rana	1,870	16.3	
Western	Ahluwalia Pritam	1,980	50.0	Elected
Western	Ibrahim Nathoo	1,227	31.0	
Western	Dharm Bir DauletRam Kohli	750	19.0	Defeated
Source: East Africa and Rhodesia
