= Eliud Mathu =

Kenyan teacher and politician (1910–1993)

- Born: 1 June 1910; Karai, Kenya
- Died: 26 May 1993 (aged 82); Nairobi, Kenya
- Education: Alliance High School, Exeter University, Balliol College, Oxford
- Occupation(s): Educator, politician
- Known for: first African member of the Legislative Council of Kenya
- Notable work: co-founded Kenya African Study Union

Eliud Wambu Mathu (1 June 1910 – 26 May 1993) was a Kenyan teacher, politician and civil servant. He was the first African member of the Legislative Council of Kenya and served from 1944 to 1957.

== Biography ==
Mathu was born on 1 June 1910, in Karai, Kenya, to a Kikuyu family. He was educated at the Alliance High School and qualified as a teacher. In 1929, he became the first African master at Alliance. Between 1932 and 1934, he studied at Fort Hare College in South Africa and passed the South Africa matriculation. He returned to teach at Alliance and pursued a Bachelor of Arts degree through a correspondence course. In 1938, he moved to the United Kingdom to complete a one-year teaching diploma from Exeter University, and study history at Balliol College, Oxford. Mathu returned to Kenya in 1940, teaching at Alliance High School until he left in 1942 to open his own school in Waithaka.

In October 1944, Mathu was nominated to the Legislative Council of Kenya to represent the African community. He became the first African member of the Council. He co-founded the Kenya African Study Union to help co-ordinate and represent African interests in the Council. During the Mau Mau Uprising rival politicians from tribes deemed loyal to the government accused him of organising the Mau Mau. Despite remaining loyal himself, as a Kikuyu, he became disqualified from serving in the Council. At the 1957 election, Mathu was replaced by Bernard Mate, a member of the Meru tribe who had the support of the government.

He died in Nairobi on 26 May 1993, aged 82.
