= Appolo Ohanga =

Kenyan politician

Appolo Ohanga was the first black Kenyan cabinet minister in the Colonial Period.

Born in 1913 at Got Regea in Siaya, Nyanza Province, the late Benaiah Appolo Ohanga was the son of the late Ongewe Okelo and Alicia Obura.

== Education ==
After passing his Common Entrance Examination in 1927 he joined Maseno School in 1928. At Maseno, the late Carey Francis recognized his unique ability and within two years, Mr Ohanga had taken his final exams for Secondary and teacher training education.

He then proceeded to Alliance High School in 1931 for Senior Secondary education and qualified for entrance to University in 1933.

However, he was prevailed upon by Carey Francis to join him in training teachers at Maseno Central School. He, therefore, returned to Maseno as a tutor and consequently taught some of his classmates.

He was a keen musician and an accomplished organist. In 1943, he was elevated to the same rank as graduate teachers in recognition of his outstanding ability. Whilst at Maseno, he got married in 1943 to Truphosa Margaret Okinyo, a school teacher, and they had ten children, Veronica, Victor, Jerusha, Hudson, Mildred, Catherine, Patricia, Christopher, David and Eric.

== Political life ==
From 1946 to 1947, he was Secretary to the Language Committee of all Nilotic languages.

In 1947 he was nominated to the Kenya Legislative Council. He became the first African in Kenya to hold a Cabinet post when he rose to the position of Minister for Community Development and Rehabilitation in 1954, a post he held until 1957.

He then joined the Civil Service as an Education Officer in the Ministry of Education, and later moved to the Ministry of Home Affairs where he was in charge of approved schools. During his tenure in the Civil Service, he was very active in the Trade Union Movement and served as President of the Civil Servants Union and first President of Central Organization of Trade Unions(COTU).

Upon his retirement from the Civil Service in 1972, he became the Chief Executive of the Kenya Senior Civil Servants Association.

In the course of his career he visited many foreign countries including India, Germany, United States of America and, severally, Great Britain. In his various capacities he traveled extensively all over Kenya and East Africa, and, until his death, he could still recall vividly by name the various personalities he met in those areas.

He retired from the Senior Civil Servants Association in 1975 and dedicated his time to his family, farming, church and community matters.

In 1986, he was awarded the Order of the Grand Warrior of Kenya by President Daniel Arap Moi.

Ohanga died on January 23, 1992, at the Aga Khan University Hospital, Nairobi.
