= 1920 East Africa Protectorate general election =

General elections were held in East Africa Protectorate (modern Kenya) in March and April 1920, the first elections in the country. The Legislative Council had previously consisted entirely of appointed members. The new Council consisted of 11 elected white members, two appointed members representing the Indian population and one appointed member representing the Arab population, as well as a number of appointees by the Governor. This allowed the Council representative, although not responsible government. The territory became Kenya Colony on 23 July.

The eleven White members were elected in single-member constituencies of Nairobi North, Nairobi South, Mombasa, Coast, Lake, Rift Valley, Plateau North, Plateau South, Kenya, Ukamba and Kikuyu.

== Results ==
Constituency	Candidate	Votes	%	Notes
Coast	Sydney Charrington			Elected
Kenya (25 March)	Reginald Berkeley Cole			Elected
Kenya (25 March)	William Segar Bastard			
Kikuyu (25 March)	Leonard Collings-Wells			Elected
Kikuyu (25 March)	Ewart Grogan			
Kikuyu (25 March)	Walter MacLellan Wilson			
Lake	Eustace Phelps			Elected
Mombasa	Kenneth Hunter Rodwell			Elected
Nairobi North (25 March)	William Moynagh			Elected
Nairobi North (25 March)	John Coverdale			
Nairobi North (25 March)	Thomas McClune			
Nairobi South (25 March)	Thomas Wood			Elected
Nairobi South (25 March)	Duncan Beaton			
Plateau North (25 March)	Herbert Kirk			Elected
Plateau North (25 March)	Eric Wilson Pardoe			
Plateau South (25 March)	Arthur Hoey			Elected
Plateau South (25 March)	Pieter Joubert			
Rift Valley	Hugh Cholmondeley			Elected
Ukamba (14 April)	William Northrup McMillan			Elected
Ukamba (14 April)	Allan Rhodes Cuninghame			
Source: Kenya Gazette Hansard
