= Sidney Farrar =

Kenyan politician (1900–1987)

Sidney Mary Catherine Anne Farrar (17 April 1900 – 1987) was a British settler in Kenya and the first woman elected to the Legislative Council of Kenya.

== Early life ==
Farrar was born in London, to Sidney Hobart-Hampden-Mercer-Henderson, 7th Earl of Buckinghamshire and his wife Georgiana.

In 1924 she married Captain Thomas Innes Farrar, a war veteran, in London, and in 1926 they moved to a farm in Kenya, settling at Mau Summit. In 1934, Thomas died leaving Farrar alone with their son Thomas.

== First Aid Nursing Yeomanry ==
During the First World War she joined the First Aid Nursing Yeomanry and served in France.

In 1932, she established the Kenyan branch of the First Aid Nursing Yeomanry. Their role expanded as result of the Second World War, and their name changed to the Women's Territorial Service. Farrar travelled to South Africa and Rhodesia to recruit drivers, and by the end of 1940 the Kenya FANYs had approximately 700–800 members. Initially they were housed in various commandeered houses in Nairobi and ran a despatch rider service between Nairobi and the King's African Rifles camps in Garissa. They also staffed the ambulances for casualties from Ethiopia. As the war progressed their role changed, and they took on additional duties such as catering and intelligence work, both in East Africa and abroad, including Cairo, Somalia, Madagascar and Malaya. Farrar gained the rank of Major and was made an MBE for her war services in 1941. The FANYs were disbanded at the end of the war.

== Politics ==
In 1937 she became the first woman elected to the Legislative Council of Kenya when she defeated Conway Harvey by just two votes. She held the seat of Nyanza until 1942.

Sidney was also a prominent member of the East Africa Women’s League and served as its president between 1953 and 1954. During her presidency the EAWL was asked to take a census on the need for Primary day schools in rural areas and as a result of this several schools were opened. She later became Chairman of the National Council of Women in Kenya.
