= Derek Erskine =

British settler in Kenya

Sir Derek Quicke Erskine (12 February 1905 - 6 September 1977) was a British settler in Kenya. He played a key role in popularising athletics in Kenya and co-founded the Kenya Amateur Athletics Association, now Athletics Kenya.

== Early life ==
He was born in Thakeham, Sussex to Sir James Erskine and Cicely Quicke. He was educated at Eton College and the Royal Military College, Sandhurst.

== Kenya ==
Erskine was invited to Kenya by a businessman with connections to Lord Delamere, and he soon set up a successful grocer business.

In 1951, together with Archie Evans, he co-founded the Kenya Amateur Athletics Association (KAAA), which would later become Athletics Kenya. He contributed significant funds to the Association, including donating the land on which the Nyayo National Stadium is now built. He was Chairman of the Association from its founding until a year after independence.

Erskine served as a Member of the Kenyan Legislative Council between 1948 and 1951. He was again a Member of the Legislative Council between 1961 and 1963 and was the Chief Whip of the Kenya African National Union Parliamentary Group between 1961 and 1964.

Politically he was a staunch advocate of racial harmony in Kenya. In response to the views of many European settlers who wanted self-rule from Britain and continued European dominance over Africans and Asians, he described the view as puerile poppycock, being both impracticable and unworkable, contravening Christian ethics, British ideas of liberty and fair play and international agreements such as the Atlantic Charter.

In 1952, he was removed from a session of the Legislative Council due to his outspoken views demanding racial equality within Kenya. He was sympathetic to Jomo Kenyatta's struggle against discrimination, and offered his house to Kenyatta when he was in detention and the government said there was no place he could live.

He was knighted in 1964 for political and public services in Kenya on the recommendation of Kenyatta.

== Death ==
Erskine died in Nairobi on 6 September 1977.
