= Markham baronets of Sedgebrooke (1642) =

Extinct baronetcy

Escutcheon of the Markham baronets of Sedgebrooke

The Markham baronetcy, of Sedgebrooke in the County of Lincoln, was created in the Baronetage of England on 15 August 1642 for Robert Markham, the son of Sir Anthony Markham and his wife the courtier Bridget Markham, daughter of Sir James Harington, 1st Baronet; he was a Royalist of the English Civil War.

The 2nd baronet represented Grantham and Newark in the House of Commons. The 3rd baronet sat as Member of Parliament for Grantham. The baronetcy became extinct on the death of the 4th baronet in 1779.

== Markham baronets, of Sedgebrooke (1642) ==
- Sir Robert Markham, 1st Baronet (1597–1667)
- Sir Robert Markham, 2nd Baronet (1644–1690)
- Sir George Markham, 3rd Baronet (1666–1736)
- Sir James John Markham, 4th Baronet (1693–1779)
