= Kenya Indian Congress =

The Kenya Indian Congress (KIC) was a political party in Kenya founded by Alibhai Mulla Jeevanjee and Allidina Visram in Mombasa.

== History ==
The party was established at a meeting on 7 March 1914 as the East African Indian National Congress (EAINC), and initially aimed to represent Indian interests across British East Africa, although it largely focused on Kenya. It called for equality between Indians and Europeans, advocating for the inclusion of Indians on the same roll as Europeans in elections and that Asians be allowed to farm in the White Highlands.

The EAINC encouraged Indian immigration to Kenya, and became involved in humanitarian work in the 1930s, providing aid to victims of disaster in India and other countries in the region. The party failed in an attempt to form an alliance with the Kenya African Union (KAU) in 1950, but the two combined to oppose plans by the Elector's Union to maintain European control of the colony.

The organisation was renamed the Kenya Indian Congress (KIC) in 1952 after Indians in Tanganyika formed the Asian Association. In 1960 the Kenya Freedom Party (KFP) was formed by a group of Indians who believed that the KIC was not sufficiently supportive of independence. General elections the following year saw the KIC win three of the 53 elected seats in the Legislative Council with 1.2% of the vote, whilst the KFP won two seats.

At its annual meeting in 1962 the KIC opted to dissolve itself as a political party as it was "no longer desirable to function politically as an Asian organisation."
