= Independent Group (Kenya) =

The Independent Group of Members of the Legislative Council was a right-wing political party in Kenya.

== History ==
Led by Llewellyn Briggs, the Independent Group was a European party that called for ministerial positions to be awarded without consideration for the racial makeup of the cabinet, using the slogan "Merit and Ability", effectively seeking to exclude Africans from government. It nominated ten candidates for the fourteen European seats in the 1956 general elections, winning eight of them.

In August 1959 Briggs formed the United Party, bringing together the Independent Group with former members of the Federal Independence Party, which had failed to win a seat in the 1956 elections.
