= Chunilal Madan =

5th Chief Justice of Republic of Kenya

Chunilal Bhagwandas Madan QC (born Chunilal Bhagwandas Bhusri; 11 November 1912 – 22 September 1989) was a Chief Justice of the Supreme Court of Kenya. He served between 1985–1986 and was succeeded by Justice Cecil Henry Ethelwood Miller.

== Biography ==
Madan was born in Nairobi, Kenya in 1912. He studied at the Government Indian School before moving to London and enrolling at the Middle Temple. He was called to the Bar in London in 1935 and on his return to Kenya he was admitted as an Advocate of the High Court in 1936.

He adopted the surname Madan in lieu of Bhusri in 1937. He was elected to the Nairobi Town Council between 1937 and 1948 and the Legislative Council between 1948 and 1961. In 1955, Madan was made Parliamentary Secretary to the Ministry for Commerce and Industry and the following year he became Asian Minister without portfolio. He was elected Chair of the Law Society of Kenya first in 1957 and again in 1960.

In 1957, he was made Queen's Counsel. He was appointed to the Supreme Court of Kenya as a puisne judge in 1961, becoming the first permanent Asian judge in Kenya. In 1977, he was appointed to the Court of Appeal, later becoming its Presiding judge. In 1985, he succeeded Alfred Simpson as the Chief Justice of the Supreme Court of Kenya. He remained in the role until 1986 when he retired upon reaching the mandatory retirement age. He died in Nairobi in 1989.

== See also ==
- Chief Justice of Kenya
- Court of Appeal of Kenya
- High Court of Kenya
