= Dorothy Shaw =

Australian plant pathologist (1920–2007)

Dorothy Shaw (1920–2007) was an Australian plant pathologist, best known for her work on coffee leaf rust (Hemileia vastatrix) and discovery of several species of fungi.

In her 60-year career, Shaw studied plant pathogens in Australia, Canada and Papua New Guinea.

The fungal genus Shawiella was named in her honour.

== Biography ==
=== Early life and education ===
Dorothy Shaw was born in Sydney to Sidney Shaw, a tinsmith, and Amy Shaw, née Field. She studied at St George's Girls School and later The University of Sydney. While completing a Bachelor of Agricultural Science, Shaw investigated wheat diseases caused by the genus Septoria. Shaw received the Thomas Lawrance Pawlett Scholarship and travelled to Winnipeg, Manitoba where she was awarded her PhD by the University of Manitoba in 1955. Her thesis examined microconidia formation in Leptosphaeria avenaria.

== Career ==
In almost 150 publications, Shaw documented her research on a broad range of topics such as mycology, plant pathology, fungal taxonomy, cytology and fungal spore collection by bees. As a sole author or co-author, Shaw named four new fungal genera and 14 new species.

In 1955, Shaw was invited by the Papua New Guinea Department of Agriculture, Stock and Fisheries to establish a Plant Pathology section. As a young scientist, Shaw faced a challenging task, with limited facilities, laboratory staff and equipment available. In addition, literature concerning endemic plant pathogens was almost 'non-existent' at the time. She continued to work in Papua New Guinea for over two decades, publishing an index of plant diseases in 1963 and one of her most influential publications, Microorganisms in Papua New Guinea in 1984. In recognition of her public service, Shaw was awarded an Independence Medal by the PNG Government. She was closely involved with the PNG Scout Association, receiving the Silver Acorn award in 1969 for her 'outstanding service'. She was appointed a Member of the Order of the British Empire in the 1970 New Year Honours.
