= William Northrup McMillan =

Kenyan settler, adventurer, and philanthropist

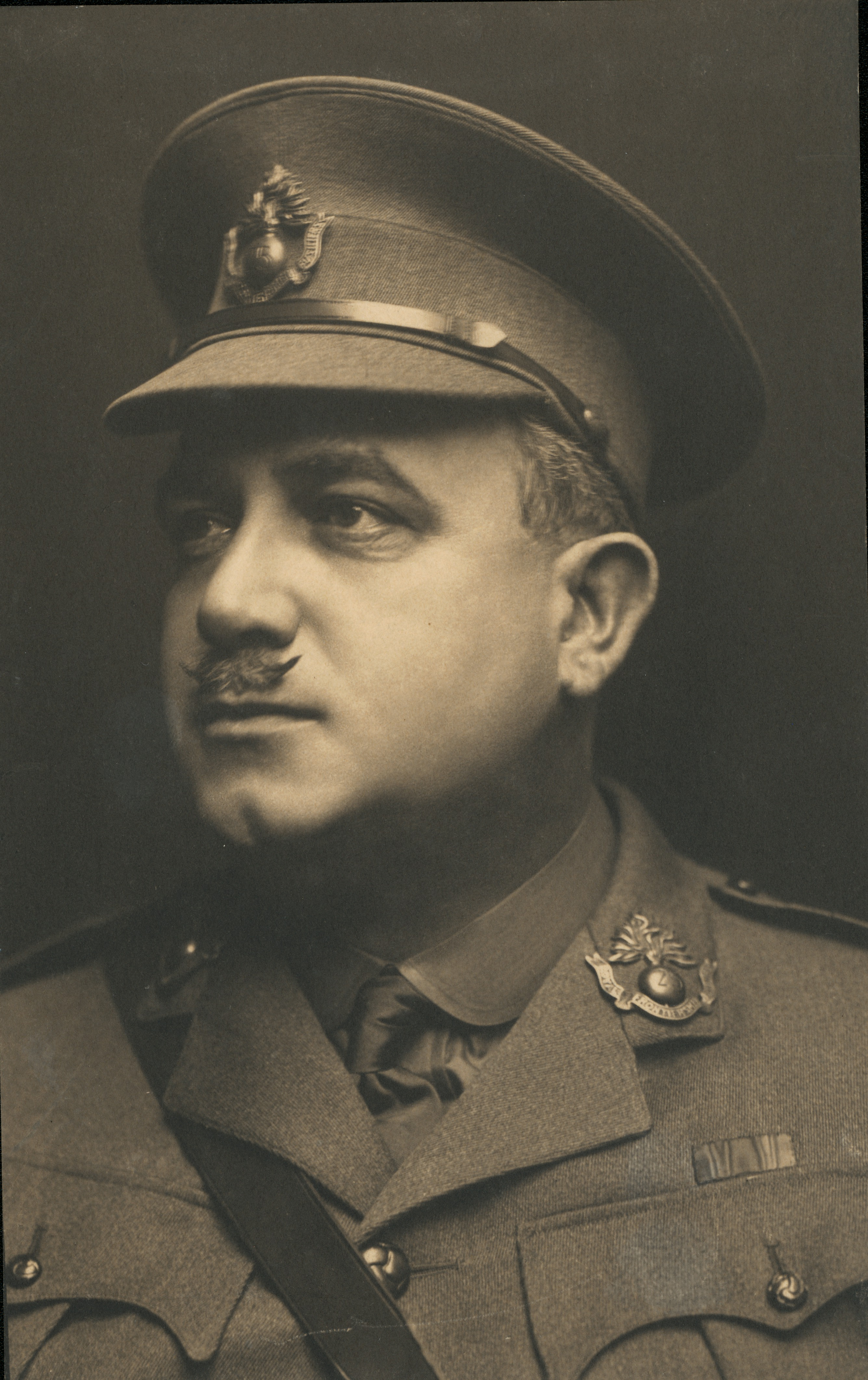
- McMillan ca. 1917
- Born: 19 October 1872; St. Louis
- Died: 22 March 1925; Nice
- Occupations: Hunter, explorer, estate owner, soldier, politician

Sir William Northrup McMillan KCMG (19 October 1872 – 22 March 1925) was a Kenyan settler, adventurer, and philanthropist.

== Background ==
McMillan was born at St. Louis, United States, the son of William McMillan. His father, a British subject born in Canada, moved to St. Louis in 1870, was naturalised as an American citizen in 1874 and established the Missouri Car & Foundry Company, which was one of 18 companies to be merged into the American Car and Foundry Company. McMillan's uncle was James McMillan who founded the Michigan Car Company and his paternal grandparents were William and Grace McMillan who had emigrated from Scotland to Canada.

== Early life ==
After leaving school, he first tried his hand at ranching in New Mexico before seeking further adventures abroad. As a young man he stood 191 cm (6 ft 3 in) tall and muscular with a strong Texan drawl. His father died when McMillan was 29, leaving him with a large inheritance. He successfully invested the money in oil fields in Romania and rubber plantations in Malaya, which made him even wealthier.

A keen adventurer, his first expedition to Africa took place in 1902 and he was involved in an expedition to Ethiopia to ascertain whether the Blue Nile was navigable for which he was awarded two decorations from Emperor Menelik II.

== East Africa ==
He first arrived in Kenya, then British East Africa, at Kilindini Harbour near Mombasa on 14 September 1904. Northrop employed colonial pioneer Giovanni (John) Destro to accompany him on his journey. Together with his wife Lucie, Northrop boarded the Uganda Railway destined for Kisumu. During the trip he engaged in big game hunting, but became so enamoured with the area around Nairobi that he departed from his hunting party, which went on to Uganda, and returned to Nairobi.

=== Juja Farm ===
In 1905 he purchased 6,100 hectares (15,000 acres) of land on a 99-year lease from the British Crown and established Juja Farm at Ol Donyo Sabuk. He then constructed a five-bedroom house on the property. The main house was followed by a three-bedroom manager's bungalow, a two-bedroom bungalow called "Lucie's bolthole", and three other bungalows housing the post and telegraph office, and rooms for chauffeurs and gardeners. The homes were fitted with electricity, running water, and a sewage system. Next he began producing maize, flax and sisal on his farm. In addition to his vast property at Juja farm, he purchased Ewart Grogan's famous house in Chiromo, Nairobi. He also maintained property abroad, namely in Berkeley Square, London, and rented Bicton House, Devon. He lived a luxurious life in East Africa, and rode in a buckboard driven by four white mules before cars came to East Africa, after which he acquired a Cadillac.

=== Theodore Roosevelt ===
On 28 September 1908 McMillan invited U.S. President Theodore Roosevelt to be his guest when he came to East Africa at the end of his presidency. Roosevelt accepted the invitation and arrived at Juja Farm on 13 May 1909, along with his son Kermit Roosevelt Roosevelt would return to Juja Farm on a few other occasions in 1909 to rest, write his book, Africa Game Trails, and correspond with his family and friends. During a substantial portion of his stay in Nairobi, Roosevelt would also stay as a guest at McMillan's townhouse which was located immediately behind The Norfolk Hotel, currently known as the Fairmont Norfolk Hotel

=== First World War ===
During the First World War, McMillan renounced his American citizenship and enlisted in the British Army. He went on to achieve the rank of Captain with the 25th (Frontiersmen) Battalion, Royal Fusiliers. He used his wealth to assist the military in a number of ways, such as equipping a regiment at his own expense and utilising his properties, Juja Farm and Chiromo Farm, as soldiers' convalescent homes. On 6 February 1918 he was knighted and was awarded the KCMG for his war time service

=== Politics ===
After purchasing Juja Farm, McMillan became a leading figure amongst the European settlers. He first entered politics as a member of the Legislative Council for the Ukamba constituency. Later in 1923, together with Lord Delamere he established the European and African Trades Organisation, whose object was to train African artisans to take Indians' places and discourage further Indian immigration into East Africa.

== Death ==
In middle age, unable to control his diet, McMillan weighed over twenty stone (280 lbs.) and developed heart problems and pleurisy. He died in Nice, France in 1925 at the age of 52. His body was returned to Kenya and he was buried at a site chosen by him prior to his death on the slopes of Ol Donyo Sabuk.

== Legacy ==
His wife Lucie continued to reside in Kenya after her husband's death, and died on 4 September 1957 in Nairobi. They had no children. The McMillans were known for their philanthropy and financed the building of the YMCA, Scott's Sanotorium and McMillan Memorial Library amongst other facilities.
