= Hamilton Ward (Kenyan politician) =

British settler (1880–1971)

Hamilton Frederick Ward (3 September 1880 – 1971) was a British settler in Kenya, and an early member of the Legislative Council of Kenya.

== Biography ==
Ward was born in London, United Kingdom into a military family. His grandfather was Vice-Admiral James Hamilton Ward. His father died when he was young, and he was raised by his mother in Bournemouth. He was educated at Eton College and after completing his studies enlisted in the British Army. He served in the Boer War with the Oxford and Buckinghamshire Light Infantry and the Irish Guards, reaching the rank of Major.

In 1904, he travelled to Kenya on a shooting expedition. Developing a likening to the country, he returned again the following year, and in April 1906 arranged a secondment to the Kings African Rifles as a lieutenant. He resigned from the army in 1908. Ward subsequently established himself as a land agent in Nairobi, becoming a key contact for new colonists in the country. In 1912, together with John Williamson Milligan, he published the Handbook of British East Africa 1912–13 extolling the virtues of East Africa for potential settlers. At the start of the First World War, Ward was placed in charge of recruitment in Nairobi. In 1924 he was elected Member of the Legislative Council of Kenya for Nairobi North and was re-elected in both 1927 and 1931.

He later moved to Nakuru and subsequently settled in South Africa where he died in 1971, survived by his wife Violet, and two children.

== See also ==
- White people in Kenya
