= New Kenya Party =

The New Kenya Party was a political party in Kenya.

== History ==
With encouragement from Governor Evelyn Baring and Secretary of State for the Colonies Alan Lennox-Boyd, the New Kenya Group was established on 2 April 1959 by Michael Blundell. It was the first multi-racial political party in Kenya, and was founded to counter African nationalism and European conservatism. In response, Llewellyn Briggs set up the United Party in August 1959, which opposed common-roll elections, but was defunct by the end of 1960.

In 1960 it became the New Kenya Party, which called for independence with a multiracial coalition government. In the 1961 general elections the party received 3.2% of the vote, winning four of the 53 elected seats in the Legislative Council, and joined the coalition government led by the Kenya African Democratic Union.

The party was dissolved in 1963.
