= 1961 Kenyan general election =

Election in Kenya

General elections were held in Kenya in February 1961. The result was a victory for the Kenya African National Union, which won 19 of the 53 elected seats.

== Electoral system ==
Twenty seats were reserved for minority communities; ten for whites, eight for Indians and two for Arabs. There were also twelve appointees. Primary elections were held for the reserved seats by members of the respective communities, and candidates receiving at least 25% of the vote advanced to the main elections.

Of the 1,411,117 registered voters, 29,879 (2.18%) were Indian, 19,332 (1.37%) white and 5,472 (0.38%) Arabs.

== Results ==
Nine constituencies (with a total of 353,251 registered voters) were uncontested, reducing the number of actual voters to 1,057,866.

Party	Votes	%	Seats
Kenya African National Union	590,661	67.50	19
Kenya African Democratic Union	143,079	16.35	11
Baluhya Political Union	28,817	3.29	1
New Kenya Party	28,284	3.23	4
Kenya Indian Congress	10,488	1.20	3
Kenya Coalition	8,891	1.02	3
Kenya Freedom Party	5,263	0.60	2
Kenya National Congress	4,561	0.52	0
Shungwaya Freedom Party	3,748	0.43	1
Coast People's Party	1,693	0.19	0
Tana River Pokomo Union	699	0.08	0
African independents	13,917	1.59	1
Arab independents	5,712	0.65	2
Asian Hindu independents	4,648	0.53	0
Asian Muslim independents	11,880	1.36	3
European independents	12,768	1.46	3
Appointed members			12
Total	875,109	100.00	65
Valid votes	875,109	98.91	
Invalid/blank votes	9,678	1.09	
Total votes	884,787	100.00	
Registered voters/turnout	1,057,866	83.64	
Source: Sternberger et al.
