= Lancaster House Conferences (Kenya) =

Meetings to discuss Kenya's independence and constitution

The Lancaster House conferences were three meetings (1960, 1962, 1963) in which Kenya's constitutional framework and independence were negotiated.

- The first conference was under the chairmanship of Secretary of State for the Colonies Iain Macleod in January 1960. There was no agreement, and Macleod issued an interim constitution.
- The second conference commenced in February 1962, and a framework for self-governance was negotiated.
- The 1963 conference finalized constitutional arrangements for Kenya's independence as a Dominion, marking the end of more than 70 years of colonial rule. In all three meetings, Prime Minister Harold Macmillan ordered that the interests of the white settlers in Kenya effectively be ignored, and that the British government continue negotiations until "real and complete independence for Kenya" could be established. This led to some anger from within elements of the British Conservative Party who wanted Britain to find an arrangement that would postpone independence.(1963 Constitution of Kenya)

== See also ==
- Fitz Remedios Santana de Souza

== Sources ==
- Matthew (editor), Colin (2004). Dictionary of National Biography. Vol. 35. Oxford: Oxford University Press. ISBN 978-0198614111., essay on Iain Macleod written by David Goldsworthy.
- Perilous journey to freedom
- Historical background to law review squabbles
