= Legislative Council of Kenya =

Legislature of Kenya (1907–1963)

Type
- Type: Unicameral house

History
- Established: 6 August 1907
- Disbanded: 12 December 1963
- Succeeded by: Parliament of Kenya
- Seats: Varied over time

Meeting place
- Parliament Buildings

The Legislative Council of Kenya (LegCo) was the legislature of Kenya between 1907 and 1963. It was modelled on the Westminster system. It began as a nominated, exclusively European institution and evolved into an elected legislature with universal suffrage. It was succeeded by the National Assembly in 1963.

== Early years ==
On 26 October 1906 an Order in Council was issued in London defining a new constitution for the East Africa Protectorate. The post of Commissioner was replaced with that of Governor and Executive and Legislative Councils, consisting of both official and unofficial members, were created.

The first Legislative Council met on 7 August 1907. The meeting was attended by the Governor, Sir James Sadler, six officially appointed members – Henry Currie, Charles Bowring, Charles William Hobley, J. Montgomery, R.M. Coombe and Colonel J. Wilson – and two unofficial members, J.H. Wilson from Mombasa and Lord Delamere. The first Council consisted solely of persons of European descent.

On 21 September 1909 Alibhai Mulla Jeevanjee was appointed to the Council, becoming the first Asian and non-European member. Governor Sir Percy Girouard opposed his nomination, but he was overruled by the Colonial Office who were keen to appoint a representative for the Indian community.

From 1911 the European settler community demanded the right to elect the unofficial members sitting in the Council, a request which was regularly denied by the Colonial Office. In 1917 the nominated members of the Council resigned their seats in protest, only returning on the promise by the Colonial Office that they would take steps to introduce legislation at cessation of the First World War.

== Introduction of elections ==
The Legislative Council Ordinance, 1919 expanded the Council to seventeen official members, including eleven European members elected by European residents. European women were now eligible to become members for the first time. The first elections under this new system took place in 1920.

The Legislative Council (Amendment) Ordinance of 1924 provided that there should be five members elected to represent the Indian community and one member to represent the Arab community. In the 1924 elections, Hamed Mohamed bin Issa became the first elected Arab member; however, the Indian community abstained from putting forward candidates in protest at not being given parity of seats with the European community. Reverend J.W. Arthur became the first official member nominated to represent the interests of the African community. A single Indian candidate, Ahmad Hussein Malik, participated in the 1927 elections and was duly returned unopposed. Following the elections, four Indians were also nominated as members. Indian seats were filled from the 1931 elections onwards.

Eliud Mathu became the first African member when he was nominated by the Governor to represent the African community at the 1944 elections. Benaiah Ohanga became the second African member in 1946.

== Wider franchise ==
In 1951 legislation was enacted providing for the election of 14 Europeans, six Asians and one Arab member. In addition, six Africans and one Arab would be nominated. This would result in there being 28 non-government members and 26 government members. The first elections held under this system were held in 1952.

The Lyttleton Constitution of 1954 introduced significant reforms. A Council of Ministers was created, with six official members from the Civil Service, two nominated members and six unofficial members all appointed by the Governor. The six unofficial members were appointed from elected members, three of which were European, two Asian, and one African. The first African minister was Benaiah Ohang.

The first elections under the new system were held in 1956. Elected representation was introduced for Africans, with elections held to fill the eight seats the following year; Bernard Mate, Ronald Ngala, Tom Mboya, Oginga Odinga, Masinde Muliro, Lawrence Oguda, Daniel arap Moi and James Muimi became the first African elected members.

In 1958, the Council was expanded again, this time under the Lennox-Boyd Constitution and now consisted of fourteen Africans, fourteen Europeans, three Asians and three Arabs. The Lennox-Boyd Constitution was amended following the first Lancaster House Conference in 1960, after which the Council of Ministers was limited to sixteen members, of which four were civil servants, four African, three European and one Asian.

The 1961 elections were the first to have a majority of African seats; the 65-member Council had twelve appointed members, 33 general seats and 20 reserved seats for minority communities (ten for Europeans, eight for Indians and two for Arabs). Primary elections were held for the reserved seats by members of the respective communities, and candidates receiving at least 25% of the vote advanced to the main elections, where all registered voters could vote for them.

In 1962 the Lancaster Constitution stipulated that the Legislative Council was to be succeeded by a bicameral parliament consisting of a Senate and House of Representatives. The 1963 elections were the first to the new legislature.

== List of elections ==
- 1920 East Africa Protectorate general election
- 1924 Kenyan general election
- 1927 Kenyan general election
- 1931 Kenyan general election
- 1934 Kenyan general election
- 1938 Kenyan general election
- 1944 Kenyan general election
- 1948 Kenyan general election
- 1952 Kenyan general election
- 1956–57 Kenyan general election
- 1961 Kenyan general election

== See also ==
- Members of the Legislative Council of Kenya
- British Kenya Colony (1920−1963)
- British East Africa Protectorate (1895−1920)
