= Awori =

Awori is a surname. Notable people with the surname include:

- W.W.W. Awori (1925–1978), pioneer Kenyan journalist, trade unionist, legislator, and freedom fighter
- Aggrey Awori (1939–2021), Ugandan economist and politician
- Grace Awori, sister of Aggrey and Moody and mother of Susan and Judi Wakhungu
- Jeremy Awori (born 1971), Kenyan businessman
- Maria Awori (born 1984), Kenyan swimmer
- Moody Awori (born 1927), Kenyan politician
- Wyllis Awori (born July 31 2004), Kenyan Pilot, Cyber security engineer, Founder & CEO building Africa's critical systems through Xkerra Group@Xkerrafrica. A multi sport athlete, he plays rugby for Administration police as a winger (squad number 11&14), Plays Football in (positions 11&7), and a competitive Swimmer.

== See also ==
- Awori tribe, a tribe of the Yoruba people
