= Michael K. Dorsey =

Environmental scientist

Michael Dorsey
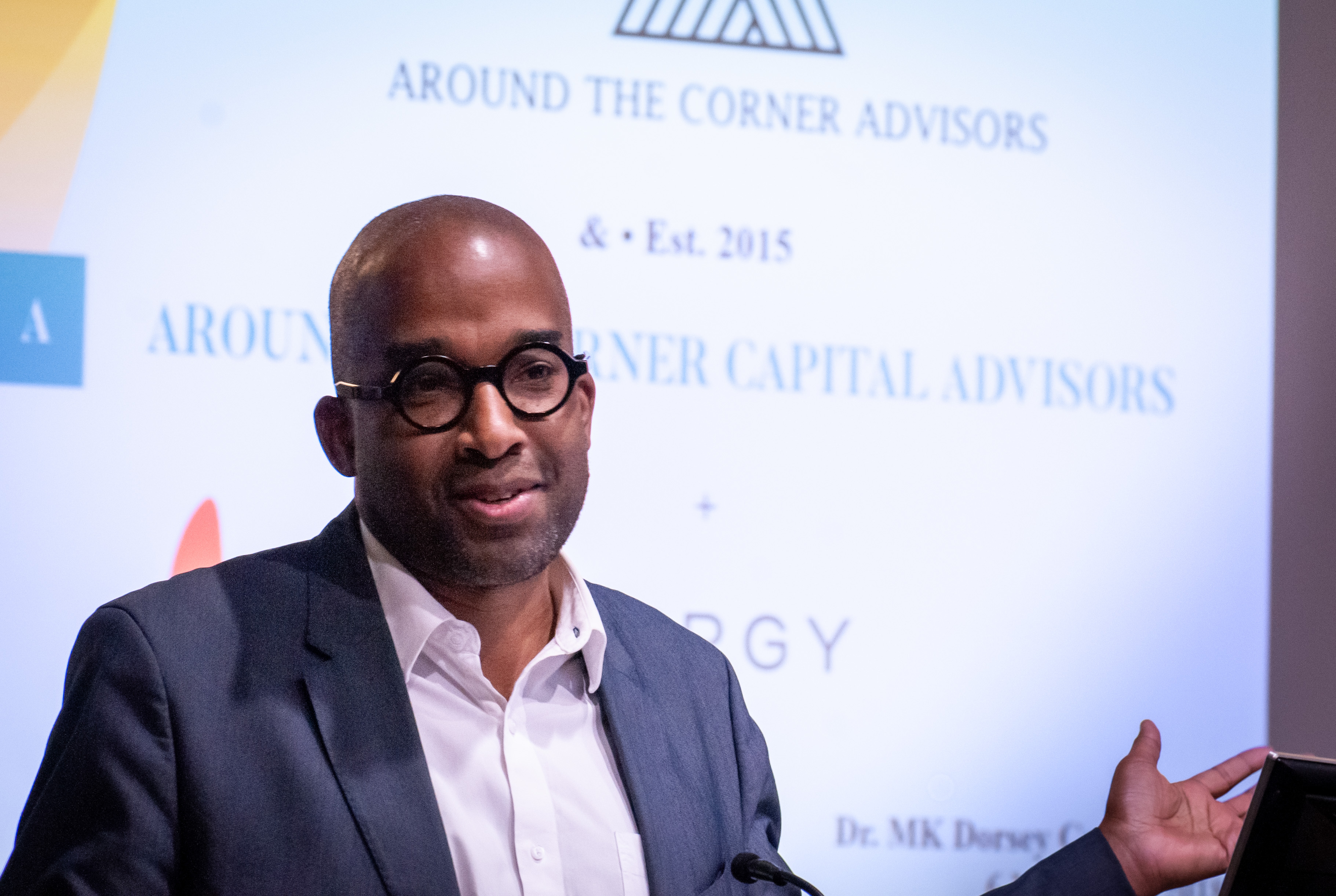
- Dorsey in 2019
- Education: University of Michigan (B.S., Ph.D.); Yale University (MFS); Johns Hopkins University (M.A.)
- Known for: Sustainability; Climate Justice; Environmental Justice
- Scientific career
- Workplaces: Club of Rome; National Academy of Sciences; Dartmouth College
- Thesis: Commercialization of biodiversity: Processes, actors, and contestation in Ecuador, 1536--2001 (2005)
- Doctoral advisor: Bunyan Bryant

Dr. Michael K. Dorsey is an environmental scientist, advocate, scholar, and entrepreneur. He is a co-founder and principal of Around the Corner Capital, an energy advisory and impact finance platform. He served on the Sierra Club board of directors for 11 years in three periods, as a petition candidate supported by reform-activists known as the John Muir Sierrans. Dorsey has contributed op-eds to the Los Angeles Times and The Wall Street Journal.

== Education ==
Dorsey holds a B.S. and Ph.D. in Natural Resources and Environmental Policy from the University of Michigan School for Environment and Sustainability. He also holds a Master of Forest Science (M.F.S) from Yale School of Forestry & Environmental Studies in 1996 and an M.A. in anthropology from Johns Hopkins University in 1998.

== Career ==
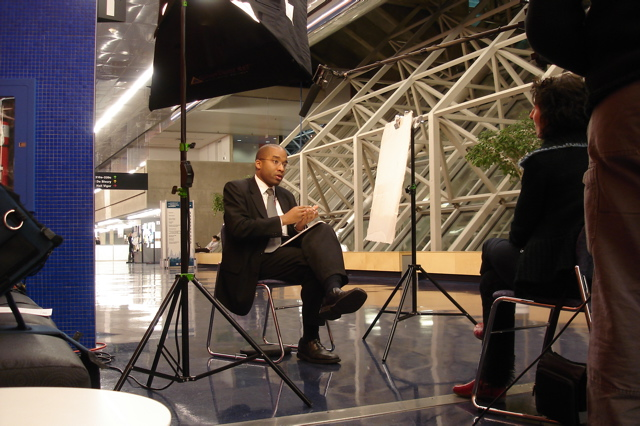
Dorsey during an interview

Since the late 1980s, Dorsey has worked with firms, non-profits, foundations, governments and a multitude of others on the interplay of multilateral environment policy, finance and economic development matters across the Americas, Africa, Asia and Europe. In 1991, Dorsey served as a youth delegate to the U.S. First National People of Color Environmental Leadership Summit. In 1992, Dorsey served as the youngest NGO representative on the United States Department of State Delegation the Earth Summit in Rio de Janeiro, Brazil. In 1993, Dorsey served on the task force for Bill Clinton's Council on Sustainable Development. In the mid-1990s Dorsey worked at the African Centre for Technology Studies at the request of the centre's founder Calestous Juma.

After completing his Ph.D., from 2005 to 2012, Dorsey was assistant professor in Dartmouth College's Environmental Studies Program and also the Director of the college's Climate Justice Research Project. He was made a member of the Club of Rome in 2013. Dorsey has also been a visiting professor at Wesleyan University; in South Africa at the University of KwaZulu-Natal and the University of the Witwatersrand; and in Sweden and at KTH Royal Institute of Technology in Stockholm. In South Africa at the University of KwaZulu-Natal and the University of the Witwatersrand Dorsey worked closely and co-published with Professor Patrick Bond on climate justice, environmental racism and problems with emissions trading.

=== Leadership ===
In the late 20th century and early 21st century Dorsey served as Director of the Sierra Club. His first two consecutive terms were from 1997 to 2003 as a petition candidate that was nominated through the efforts of reform-activists known as the John Muir Sierrans. Dorsey was appointed and re-elected to the Sierra Club Board of Directors in 2012 (for two years) and 2014 (for a full three-year term). In total he has served eleven years as a Director on the national board of the Sierra Club. Dorsey is also a founding member of the San Francisco-based Center for Environmental Health, is a member of the Executive Advisory Board of Plastic Pollution Coalition, and is a co-founding director of the Environmental Leadership Program. In 2017 he was appointed to the board of Food First.

While he was at Dartmouth College, from 2007 to 2008, Dr. Dorsey served as an environmental advisor on the Barack Obama 2008 presidential campaign. In 2010, Dorsey was appointed to the Advisory Committee of the United States Environmental Protection Agency. In 2012, Dorsey was re-appointed.

Following Dartmouth College Dorsey was a visiting professor at Wesleyan University. There he collaborated with two former Wesleyan students: Evan Weber and Matthew Lichtash, and obtained a $30,000 grant plus free office space provided by the Sierra Club to draft an ambitious plan for climate action, which was the basis for the incorporation of the US Climate Plan 501(c)(3) nonprofit incorporated in January 2014.

Dorsey is also co-founder and former board member of Islands First, a multilateral negotiating-capacity-building organization for small island developing states facing disproportionate threats from unfolding climate change; a co-founder of Detroit XPAC, a nonpartisan political action committee whose goal is to help the expats of Detroit and of Michigan connect with their hometowns by collecting contributions and supporting candidates who will revitalize Detroit in a fiscally and environmentally responsible manner; and U.S. Climate Plan, the predecessor to the Sunrise Movement Education Fund, a climate policy advocacy group elevating the national dialogue, engaging the American people, and building political support for real climate policy solutions.

== Awards ==
- Dartmouth College Social Justice Award for "Ongoing Commitment."
- Thurgood Marshall Dissertation Fellow (2001-02)."
- Nominated for the Ford Foundation's Leadership for a Changing World Award (2000).
- Rotary International's highest honor, the Paul Harris Medal for Distinguished Service to Humanity (1997)

== Publications ==
Dr. Dorsey has published dozens of articles on a variety of environment, development and sustainable finance matters. A partial list of his publications are at Google Scholar.

Dorsey has been featured on CNN International, Democracy Now!, and Al Jazeera. His writing has been published in Institutional Investor, the Los Angeles Times, New Scientist, The New York Times, the Orlando Sentinel, The Sacramento Bee, U.S. News & World Report, and The Wall Street Journal.
