= W.W.W. Awori =

Kenyan legislator and freedom fighter

Wycliffe Wasya Work Awori (W.W.W. Awori)
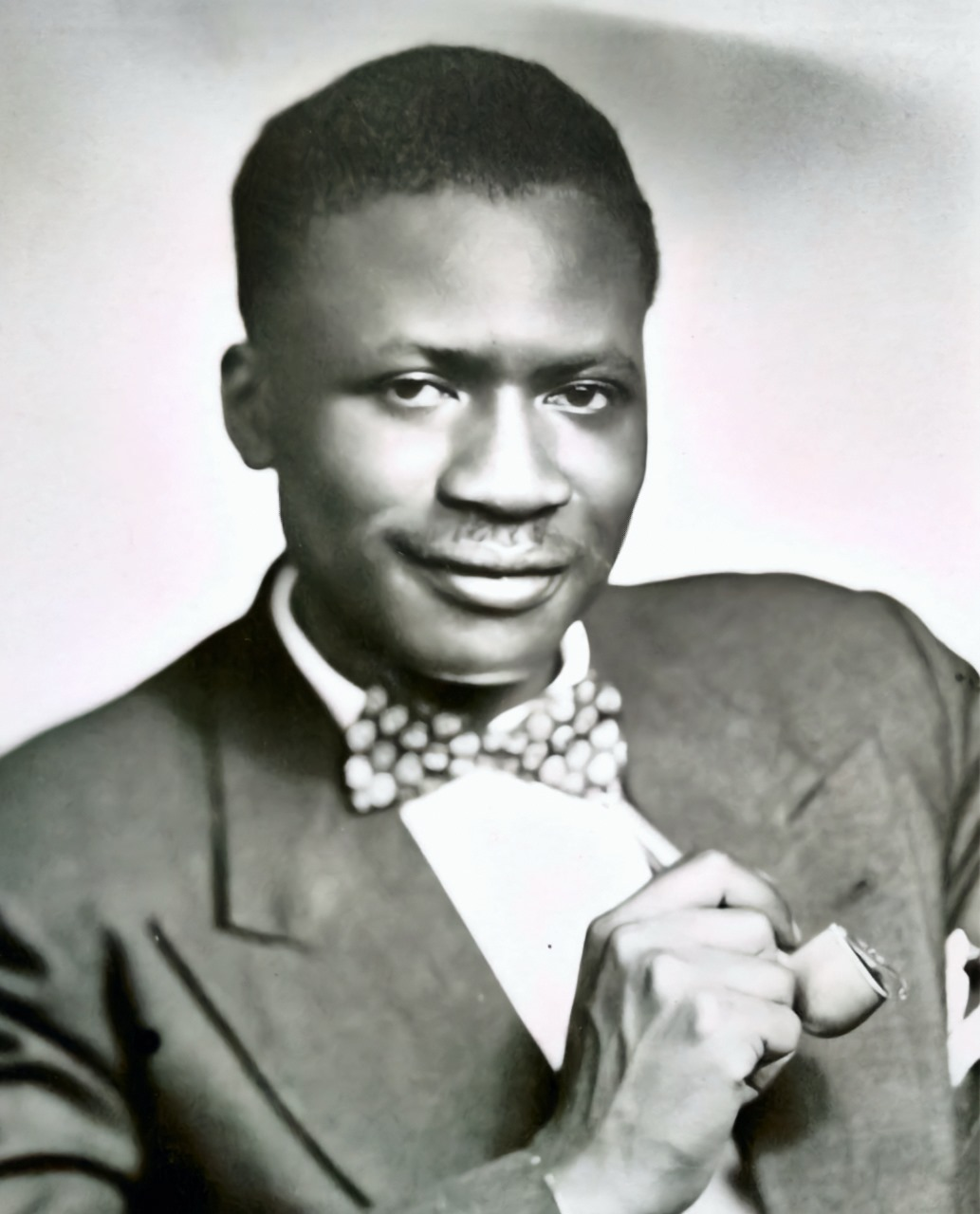
- Born: August 2, 1925; Butere, Kenya
- Died: May 5, 1978 (aged 52)
- Resting place: Funyula, Kenya
- Education: Makerere University School of Public Health
- Occupation: Journalist • Editor • Trade unionist • Legislator
- Title: Nominated Representative to the Legislative Council of Kenya (North Nyanza)
- Term: 1952–1956
- Successor: Masinde Muliro
- Political party: Kenya African Union
- Spouses: Grace Wanjiru Njoroge (1951–1964); Jane Wairimu Gathoni (1965–1978)
- Children: 5
- Relatives: Hon. Moody Arthur Awori (brother); Hon. Aggrey Awori (brother); Dr. Mary Okelo (sister); Dennis Awori (nephew); Susan Wakhungu-Githuku (niece); Judi Wakhungu (niece)

Wycliffe Wasya Work Awori (August 2, 1925 – May 5, 1978) was a pioneer Kenyan journalist, trade unionist, legislator, and freedom fighter. Popularly known as W.W.W. Awori, he was an eminent agitator for Kenya’s independence movement from the end of World War II and during the Kenya Emergency, which lasted from 1952 to 1959.

W.W.W. Awori was among the early members of the Kenya African Union (KAU) and served as Acting Secretary General, Treasurer, Acting Vice President, and Acting President at various periods before the organization was banned in June 1953. In 1946, at the age of 20, he represented the organization’s executive committee on a mission to the United Kingdom to persuade Jomo Kenyatta to return from England to lead the KAU and Kenya’s fight for Independence. In 1952, following the detention of the Kapenguria Six, W.W.W. Awori joined forces with other prominent politicians to secure a strong legal team, which included Denis Pritt, among other Kenyan and international lawyers.

He was one of the first African representatives nominated to the Legislative Council of Kenya (Legco), representing North Nyanza from 1952 to 1956. Prior to this appointment, he was a prolific editor and journalist involved in pre-Independence publications supporting Kenya’s trade union movement and fight for liberation. A proponent of the Pan-African movement, he drew inspiration from the struggle of other occupied countries in Africa and the Caribbean. Towards the end of his career, which spanned nearly 35 years, W.W.W. Awori served as the editor of the Kenya Hansard.

== Early life and family background ==
W.W.W. Awori was born on August 2, 1925 at the Church Mission Society (CMS, formerly Church Missionary Society) Butere Mission in Kakamega County, which was then part of Kenya’s Western Province.

His father, Rev. Canon Jeremiah Awori (1890–1971), was the first ordained Luhya priest for the Anglican Christian ministry and served on the Local Native Council for North Kavirondo (later Western Province) for 41 years. He belonged to the Abafofoyo clan (Marachi sub-tribe). He was also a member of subsequent local councils and became Vice Chairman of the Elgon Nyanza Council and Chairman of the Busia County Council. W.W.W. Awori’s mother, Mariamu Olubo Odongo (1900–1964), trained women in health science, first aid, and child care through Mothers’ Unions. She belonged to the Abakhulo clan (Abasamia sub-tribe).

W.W.W. Awori was the fourth of Rev. Canon Jeremiah Awori and Mariamu Olubo Odongo’s 17 children. Their first-born son, Musa, died at the age of four. Rev. Canon Jeremiah Awori married Mary Akinyi in 1968 following the passing of Mariamu Olubo Odongo in September 1964, and they had a daughter, Naomi Maria Nambiro, in 1969.

== Education ==
After attending school in Butere and later Nambale, W.W.W. Awori joined Kakamega High School. Thereafter, he trained as a public health officer in Uganda at Mulago School of Public Health, currently known as the Makerere University School of Public Health under the Makerere University College of Health Sciences.

After working at the Municipal Council of Nairobi as a health inspector from 1943 to 1944, W.W.W. Awori left employment to pursue journalism and politics full-time.

== Political career ==
From his early twenties, W.W.W. Awori was famed for being “vocal in the politics of independence in Nairobi.” He was a committed member of KAU, a political organization founded in 1944 to support the appointment of the first African representative to the Legislative Council of Kenya, Eliud Mathu, and serve as a channel for the interests of Africans across the country. According to John Spencer’s book KAU: Kenya African Union, the colonial administration insisted that the organization change its name to Kenya African Study Union (KASU) to appear as a “study group” for Africans interested in public affairs. However, the organization’s leaders reverted to the original name at the KAU Second Delegates Conference in February 1946.

By the end of the Second World War in 1945, dissent against the oppressive colonial regime and racially discriminatory practices was growing in tandem with demands for higher wages and better working conditions for African workers. As the KAU’s Assistant Secretary General at the time, W.W.W. Awori “actively supported” the Fifth Pan-African Congress held in Manchester in October 1945 with KAU President James Gichuru and Secretary Francis Khamisi. The Congress was significant in Kenya’s independence movement due to the attendance of Jomo Kenyatta, who represented Kenya as its national and trade union delegate in the United Kingdom, where he had been living since 1931.

At KAU’s Second Delegates Conference in February 1946, W.W.W. Awori was elected Treasurer alongside Joseph D. Otiende, also from Western Kenya, who became the party’s Vice President.

In July 1946, KAU leaders selected 20-year-old W.W.W. Awori to represent the organization on a multi-pronged political mission to the United Kingdom. In addition to delivering a petition of grievances to British trade unionist and politician Arthur Creech Jones, he was tasked with convincing Jomo Kenyatta to return to Kenya and take up the presidency of the KAU. The trip was fraught with logistical and funding challenges, prolonging W.W.W. Awori’s stay for 10 months. During this time, he held meetings with British politicians and Members of Parliament to appeal for African education, land ownership, and labour reforms. He also advocated for additional African representation in the Legislative Council and the abolition of the discriminatory kipande identity certificate. Additionally, he met with the British Trade Union Congress, which expressed interest in Kenya’s trade union movement. Jomo Kenyatta sailed back to Kenya in September 1946, while W.W.W. Awori remained in England.

The 13-day Mombasa general strike in January 1947 had significantly emboldened the national independence movement that KAU had initiated. According to Kenyan trade unionist Makhan Singh’s historical reports, a resolution was passed at a massive meeting of workers in Majengo, Mombasa in March 1947 in support of KAU’s request to raise funds for W.W.W. Awori’s journey back from London, “knowing he was executing a noble and faithful obligation and serving his country in doing so.”

A few months after his return from England, W.W.W. Awori was elected KAU Vice President at the annual conference on June 1, 1947. Jomo Kenyatta took over from James Gichuru as President of the KAU. W.W.W. Awori was the only member of the prior committee to be re-elected.

He continued to raise the profile of Pan-Africanism and inter-community cooperation in the fight against colonial rule. In July 1947, he spoke against racial segregation in South Africa at a mass meeting organized by the Nairobi Indian Association. He also addressed workers at a historic meeting in Kaloleni Social Hall on August 16, 1947 in honour of the opening of the Nairobi branch of the African Workers Federation by Chege Kibachia, who was elected President of the federation at the Majengo meeting in March. Chege Kibachia was arrested on August 17, 1947, and a deportation order was issued for Makhan Singh on August 27, 1947, signalling the colonial government’s panic over the increasing frequency of organized worker action in other towns following the Mombasa general strike.

Factions emerged within the KAU leading up to the declaration of the State of Emergency in 1952, and the subsequent proscription of the organization in 1953. According to A History of Africa: African nationalism and the de-colonisation process, conservative KAU members, who included the educated elite, advocated for freedom through reform and constitutionalism, while the radical elements were more inclined towards militant tactics. As KAU President, Jomo Kenyatta insisted that members from different parts of the country should be represented in the organization’s executive committee. However, the divide between moderates and radicals continued to grow.

In June 1952, W.W.W. Awori was appointed as an African member of the Legislative Council representing North Nyanza. He joined Eliud Mathu, Fanuel Walter Odede, Benaiah Apollo Ohanga, John Kipsugut arap Chemallan, John Ole Tameno, and James Jeremiah.

A few months later, on October 20, 1952, Governor Evelyn Baring declared a State of Emergency and ordered the arrests of nationalist and trade union leaders, including KAU members Jomo Kenyatta, Bildad Kaggia, Kung’u Karumba, Fred Kubai, Paul Ngei, and Achieng’ Oneko (together known as the Kapenguria Six) following increasing suspicion of Mau Mau militancy. Just four months before these arrests during Operation Jock Scott, W.W.W. Awori had hosted Jomo Kenyatta, Achieng’ Oneko, Paul Ngei, and Bildad Kaggia in Kakamega.

An Emergency Committee of KAU appointed Fanuel Walter Odede as the Acting President, Joseph Murumbi as the Acting General Secretary, and W.W.W. Awori as the Acting Treasurer soon after the arrests. Together, they sought funds and a strong legal team to defend the detainees ahead of their trial in late 1952. They recruited British barrister Denis Pritt to lead the international defense counsel alongside lawyers A.R. Kapila, Fitz de Souza, and Jaswant Singh from Kenya, as well as Diwan Chaman Lall from India, H.O. Davies from Nigeria, Dudley Thompson from the West Indies, and Peter Evans from England. The colonial government deliberately held the trial at Kapenguria, a small town near the Kenya-Uganda border to mitigate public interest and potential uproar, and “did everything they could to inconvenience the defence team.” During the trial, W.W.W. Awori regularly used his personal car to drive the legal team from Nairobi to the remote outpost in Kapenguria, a distance of over 500 kilometres on rough terrain.

According to Makhan Singh’s 1952-1956: Crucial Years of Kenya Trade Unions, KAU were “consolidating the national upsurge that had recently been enhanced by the Mau Mau struggles, Kapenguria trial, and activities of the KFRTU [Kenya Federation of Registered Trade Unions]” under the direction of Fanuel Walter Odede, Joseph Murumbi, and W.W.W. Awori during the early months of the Emergency. However, the leadership of Fanuel Walter Odede (who represented South Nyanza as a Member of the Legislative Council) and W.W.W. Awori was being challenged by “tribal elements in Nyanza and other parts of the country” at the same time that the colonial government’s alarm intensified about the “growing unity and tempo of the national struggle.”

Fanuel Walter Odede was arrested on March 9, 1953 for his alleged contact with the Mau Mau and attempts to spread violent methods adopted by the movement in Nyanza, according to a report in the East African Standard. W.W.W. Awori was arrested soon after Odede’s detention but was released after his father, Rev. Canon Jeremiah Awori, intervened. He was elected as Acting President of KAU the day after Odede’s arrest. Tom Mboya, described as W.W.W. Awori’s “protégé” in his biography, took over his treasurer role, having served as Director of Publicity since joining KAU in 1952. As KAU’s Acting President, W.W.W. Awori continued to face the threat of arrest and constant harassment, including raids on the KAU offices by colonial security agents. Like many trade unions and nationalist organizations, KAU was proscribed on June 8, 1953 under Emergency regulations, making W.W.W. Awori the last President of the KAU.

W.W.W. Awori lost his seat in the Legislative Council to Masinde Muliro in the 1956–57 Kenyan general election, when the colonial government introduced elected positions for eight African constituencies. He vied for the North Nyanza seat again in 1963, but was unsuccessful. Although he stepped away from politics after Kenya attained independence, he served as editor of the Hansard until 1968.

== Career in journalism ==
Described as a “writer who inspired the combatants and non-combatants” alike, W.W.W. Awori contributed to Kenya’s growing nationalist press as a journalist, editor, and publisher in the aftermath of World War II and during the Emergency despite government measures to silence dissent.

In the documentary “Makers of a Nation: The Men and Women of Kenya’s History,” W.W.W Awori is said to have used the wealth earned from trading crocodile skins to fund newspaper ventures. As one of the first known Luhya journalists, he edited Omuluyia, a monthly Kiluhya newspaper in circulation from 1945 to 1947, according to historian Shiraz Durrani’s Never Be Silent: Publishing & Imperialism in Kenya 1884-1963. The publication was later incorporated into Radio Posta in 1947, growing from a Kiswahili weekly to a daily newspaper with a circulation of 10,000 copies. Durrani’s book also lists him as the founder of Ramogi, a Dholuo paper published in Nairobi from 1945 to 1962 and edited by Achieng’ Oneko for its first three years.

As part of the KAU executive committee, he edited the organization’s monthly Kiswahili and English newspaper, Sauti ya Mwafrika. Published intermittently between 1945 and 1952 due to internal disagreements and lack of funds, it was banned at the start of the Emergency. Pre-Independence reporter John G. Gatu recounts a KAU meeting in which Jomo Kenyatta urged members to pledge donations to resume publication of Sauti ya Mwafrika, and mentions W.W.W. Awori’s travelling to Europe to obtain printing supplies. Other editors of the publication were Francis Khamisi, Tom Mbotela, and Tom Mboya.

Most publishers of African newspapers were aligned with both the nationalist and trade union movements and used their platforms to “build a political awareness that had not existed before.” According to Durrani, W.W.W. Awori was the first editor of the Kiswahilli weekly Habari in 1945 when “it was a KAU mouthpiece” and later edited Habari za Dunia, which was active from 1952 to 1954, giving “a true picture of the situation during the Emergency.” W.W.W. Awori mentored Tom Mboya, who served as circulation manager of Habari za Dunia and was gaining traction in the trade union movement. As the editor, W.W.W. Awori reserved a page for union news in Habari za Dunia from 1953 to 1954.

In 1958, W.W.W. Awori and John Keen were part of the “tiny” editorial team of Taifa, a new Kiswahili publication founded by Charles Hayes. The publication focused on human interest stories and the independence movement in other African countries, topics not covered in contemporary press. By 1960, the paper was published daily as Taifa Leo and its English counterpart Daily Nation was introduced. In 2000, W.W.W. Awori’s brother Hannington Awori became chairman of the Nation Media Group, which owns both publications.

== Political beliefs ==
Despite increasing threats to suppress anti-government sentiment from the mid-1940s and through the Emergency, W.W.W. Awori continued to edit and write for newspapers calling “the people to emancipate themselves from colonial rule.”

As a Member of the Legislative Council and KAU leader, W.W.W. Awori openly challenged draconian Emergency regulations, coming under pressure to desist. Makhan Singh writes that on November 28, 1952, it was reported that W.W.W. Awori called for a conference to address Kenya’s problems and “that the drastic actions taken by the colonial regime since the beginning of the Emergency would do no good.”

According to Jack Roekler’s study of Eliud Mathu, W.W.W. Awori and Benaiah Apollo Ohanga were both notable Members of the Legislative Council and active in “organizations promoting multiculturalism.” Throughout his career, he maintained strong relationships with Asian politicians, trade unionists, and diplomats including Makhan Singh, Pio Gama Pinto, Fitz de Souza, A.R. Kapila, A.M. Desai, and Apa Pant, India’s High Commissioner in Kenya, who helped him conceal incriminating documents from colonial security agents during a raid at the KAU offices.

During the Emergency, W.W.W. Awori repeatedly approached the colonial administration to minimize violence and promoted dialogue as a solution. According to a December 1952 Hansard report, he, Fanuel Walter Odede, and Joseph Murumbi tried to convince the Governor and the Secretary of State for the Colonies in Nairobi to allow meetings of Africans and “offered to go themselves to the Kikuyu people and dissuade them from violence and encourage them to live peaceably,” but these requests were denied. On February 3, 1953, he introduced a motion to the Legislative Council to allow African Members to hold meetings with their constituents, but the motion was opposed.

== Business ==
According to the A Profile of Kenyan Entrepreneurs, W.W.W. Awori was an “aggressive businessman who made his first million in his early twenties.” He was engaged in the lucrative crocodile skin export business in the early 1940s. In his autobiography, Hon.Moody Arthur Awori, who assisted his brother W.W.W. Awori in operating the enterprise, explains that it involved collecting crocodile skins in Uganda and transporting them via Lake Victoria and Kisumu before sending them to buyers in Mombasa.

== Personal life ==
W.W.W. Awori was married to Grace Wanjiru Njoroge from 1951 to 1964. They had two sons named Papa (W.W.W. Awori Jr.) and Gogo. According to the Awori family biography Seizing the Moment, Grace Wanjiru Njoroge was one of the first women broadcasters with the Kenya Broadcasting Service (later Kenya Broadcasting Corporation). Her father, James (J.J.) Njoroge, was an official of the Kikuyu Central Association and had served in the Kings African Rifles during World War 1.

After W.W.W. Awori separated from Grace Wanjiru Njoroge, he married Jane Wairimu Gathoni, and they had three daughters: Samia, Sherrie, and Gladys (deceased). They shared their lives until he died in 1978.

A member of the notable Awori family, W.W.W. Awori had numerous siblings who also made contributions in various fields, including politics, medicine, law, engineering, education, and business in Kenya and Uganda. His siblings are Musa Awori (deceased in childhood), Ellen Peres Owori (deceased), Joshua Ayienga Awori (deceased), Rhoda Nambanja Ouya (deceased), Hon. Moody Arthur Awori (former Vice President of Kenya), Engineer Hannington Ochwada Awori (deceased), Winifred Wangalwa Odera (deceased), Margaret Orwaya Openda, Professor Nelson Wanyama Awori (deceased), Engineer Ernest Achibo Awori (deceased), Hon. Aggrey Sirioyi Awori (deceased, former Ugandan minister), Grace Odongo Wakhungu, Dr. Mary Omina Okelo (founder of Makini Schools), Christine Wangalwa Hayanga, Henry Wasya Awori, Willis Mwendi Awori, and Naomi Maria Nambiro.

== Death ==
W.W.W. Awori died at the Aga Khan Hospital in Nairobi on May 5, 1978 after a short illness. His funeral service on May 11, 1978 at the All Saints Cathedral was attended by then Attorney-General Charles Njonjo, Minister of Finance Mwai Kibaki, and Minister of Works N. Munoko, as well as Members of Parliament. Peter Habenga Okondo, who went on to become the Minister for Commerce and Industry and later Minister of Labour, read the eulogy outlining W.W.W. Awori’s “chequered career as a journalist, freedom fighter and politician.”

W.W.W. Awori was laid to rest at his home in Funyula in Busia County. The constituents he served as a Member of the Legislative Council paid their respects in Nambale before the burial.

== Legacy ==
As a participant in Kenya’s freedom struggle and the first of his siblings to enter national politics, W.W.W. Awori is regarded as the leading politician in his family and a positive influence on others. His elder brother Joshua Awori, who described him as the smartest and most versatile of the family members in politics, is quoted in a 2010 Standard Digital article: “WWW started it all on a good note. The others joined over three decades later, Aggrey in 1981 and Moody in 1983 — and all with their separate fortunes.”
