= Kenya Open (tennis) =

Defunct tennis tournament
- Tour: ILTF World Circuit (1934–73); ILTF Independent Circuit
- Founded: 1934; 91 years ago
- Abolished: 1986; 39 years ago
- Location: Nairobi, Kenya
- Surface: Clay (outdoors)

The Kenya Open also known as the Kenya Championships was a men's and women's tennis tournament founded in 1934 as the Kenyan International Championships. later called the Kenyan Closed Championships It was organised by the Kenyan Lawn Tennis Association (f.1922), Nairobi, Kenya and played on clay courts and ran until 1986 as part of the ILTF Independent Circuit.

== History ==
In 1922 the Kenyan Lawn Tennis Association (KLTA) was founded. In 1934 the KLTA became an associate member of the ILTF. The same year it organised the first Kenyan International Championships an open tournament initially held in August then played annually in the summer. In 1968 the association changed the denomination of that tournament to Kenya Championships and moved the event till late winter usually starting at the end of January and finishing end of February or starting mid February ending early March this was also an open event. From 1974 it was re branded as the Kenya Open until 1982, it later became a closed tournament (for Kenyan players only) from 1983 to the late 1980s. The tournament was played as part of the ILTF African Circuit a regional sub circuit of the ILTF World Circuit from 1968 to 1972, the it became part ILTF Independent Circuit until 1986 when it was downgraded from the world circuit. The event however was till being held as late as 2022.

== Finals ==
=== Men's singles ===
(incomplete roll)

Kenyan International Championships
Year	Winners	Runners-up	Score
↓ ILTF World Circuit ↓
1948	(United Kingdom) Jack Piercy	(United Kingdom) Robert Cooper	6–3, 6–0, 6–2.
1949	(Kenya) R.J.E. Mayers	(United Kingdom) Jack Piercy	6–2, 2–6, 10–12, 6–1, 6–3.
1950	(Kenya) R.J.E. Mayers	(United Kingdom) F.D.M. Flowerdew	6–1, 6–4, 6–2.
1961	(Kenya) Yashvin Shretta	?	?
1965	(India) Shyam Minotra	(Kenya) Yashvin Shretta	7-9, 6-4, 6-2, 6-4.
1966	(India) Ramanathan Krishnan	(Kenya) Yashvin Shretta	6–2, 6–0, 6–4.
Kenya Invitation
1967	(United States) Jim McManus	(United States) John Pickens	6–2, 2–6, 7–5, 6–8, 6–2.
↓ Open era ↓
Kenya Championships
1969	(Belgium) Bernard Mignot	(Kenya) Yashvin Shretta	6–0, 6–2.
1970	(Kenya) Yashvin Shretta (2)	(Egypt) Ahmed Hassanein	7–5, 6–4, 6–4.
1971	(Egypt) Aly El Dawoudi	(Kenya) Yashvin Shretta	6–4, 6–4, 3–6, 6–4.
↓ ILTF Independent Circuit ↓
1973	(Jamaica) Richard Russell	(United Kingdom) David Lloyd	8–6, 6–4, 6–4.
Kenya Open
1974	(France) Pierre Joly	(United States) Lee Tomlinson	7–6, 6–3, 6–1.
1976	(United States) Norman Holmes	(United Kingdom) John Feaver	6–0, 6–2, 7–6.
1977	(Australia) Bob Rheinberger	(West Germany) Uli Heyne	6–2, 6–7, 6–2.
1978	(Austria) Peter Feigl	(Belgium) Bernard Mignot	6–1, 6–4, 6–2.
1979	(Nigeria) David Imonitie	(Sweden) Per Larsson	6–7, 7–6, 11–9.
1980	(Australia) Wayne Pascoe	(Sweden) Ola Hellgren	6–4, 2–6, 6–1.
Kenyan Closed Championships
1983	(Kenya) Selim Rana	(Kenya) Steven Kasigwa	6–3, 6–2

=== Women's singles ===
(incomplete roll)

Kenyan International Championships
Year	Winners	Runners-up	Score
↓ ILTF World Circuit ↓
1948	(Kenya) Sheila Paterson Dowdeswell	(Kenya) Mrs J.F. Mark	6–0, 6–2
1949	(Kenya) Mrs J.F. Mark	(Kenya) M. Muir	6–2, 6–1
1950	(Kenya) Margot Lumb Gordon	(Kenya) Mrs M.C. Swan	6–2, 6–1
1951	(Kenya) Doris Unwin	(Kenya) Grizel Swynnerton	2–6, 6–2, 6–2
1952	(Kenya) Grizel Swynnerton	(Kenya) Mrs E. Boswell	6–1, 6–0
1953	(South Africa) Julia Wipplinger	(South Africa) Thea S. Hale	7–5, 6–2
1954	(Kenya) Margot Lumb Gordon	(Kenya) Frances Hook Marshall	6–2, 7-5
1955	(Kenya) Frances Hook Marshall	(Kenya) Mrs W. Michell	6–4, 6–4
1956	(Kenya) Frances Hook Marshall (2)	(Pakistan) Khanum Haji Singh	4–6, 6–3, 6–3
1957	(United Kingdom) Grizel M. Swynnerton (2)	(Kenya) J. Sheridan	4–6, 6–2, 6–2
1958	(Kenya) Margot Lumb Gordon (2)	(Kenya) Miss Morgan	6–3, 6–3
1960	(Rhodesia) Eve Sladden	(Rhodesia) Loise Surgey	6–4, 3–6, 6–2
1961	(Kenya) Debbie Adams	(United Kingdom) Grizel M. Swynnerton	6–4, 3–6, 6–3
1962	(Kenya) Doris Unwin	(Kenya) F. Spring	5–7, 6–3, 6–1
1963	(United Kingdom) Grizel M. Swynnerton	(Kenya) Elizabeth Haggie	5–7, 6–3, 6–1
Kenyan Championships
1968	(United Kingdom) Virginia Wade	(West Germany) Kerstin Seelbach	4–6, 6–1 6–2
1969	(Kenya) Elizabeth Haggie	(Kenya) Mrs Wendy Hall	4–6, 6–1 6–2
1970	(United States) Alice Tym	(Rhodesia) Daphne Paterson	6–1, 6–3
1971	(India) Nirupama Mankad	(Kenya) Jenny Patterson	6–2, 6–1
1972	(United Kingdom) Winnie Shaw	(France) Gail Chanfreau	2–6, 6–2, 6–4
↓ ILTF Independent Circuit ↓
1973	(South Africa) Brenda Kirk	(Kenya) Jenny Patterson	7–5, 6–1
Kenya Open
1974	(United Kingdom) Annette Coe	(United Kingdom) Corinne Molesworth	7–5, 6–1
1976	(United Kingdom) Annette Coe	(Austria) Uschi Ulrich	6–2, 6–4
1980	(United Kingdom) Lesley Charles	(United Kingdom) Debbie Stewart	3–6, 6–3, 6–4
Kenyan Closed Championships
1983	(Kenya) Carol Hughes	(Kenya) S. Trempenau	6–3, 6–2
1984	(Kenya) Susan Wakhungu	(Kenya) Jane Ndunda	7–5, 6–3
1985	(Kenya) Carol Hughes	(Kenya) Jane Ndunda	4–6, 6–4, 6–2
1986	(Kenya) Judi Wakhungu	(Kenya) R. Wilson	?

== See also ==
- Category:National and multi-national tennis tournaments
