= Thelma Awori =

Ugandan politician

- Born: 1943 March 25; Monrovia, Liberia
- Citizenship: Ugandan
- Education: Harvard University (B.A.); University of California at Berkeley (M.A.); Columbia University (Ph.D.)
- Occupations: Ugandan professor, individual African feminist, adult educator, former Assistant Secretary-General of the United Nations,
- Known for: African Association for Literacy and Adult Education, Nairobi, and American Society for Training and Development,
- Political party: Uganda People's Congress (formerly)
- Board member of: Board Chairperson of Crested Capital, Founding Chair and Co-President, Sustainable Market Women's Fund, Liberia, Board Chairperson of Africa Leadership Institute, Steering Committee of the African Women's Leadership Network
- Spouse: Aggrey Awori-16 February 2009 to 27 May 2011

Thelma Awori is a Ugandan professor, former Assistant Secretary-General of the United Nations, and feminist. She was born on March 25, 1943, in Monrovia, Liberia and came to Uganda in 1965. She is a former Uganda People's Congress diehard, who defected to the Movement. She is an individual African feminist who believes in justice for women and the validity of women’s perspectives. She has found an extremely high prevalence of internalized oppression due to religion and socialization.

== Education ==
She studied at Harvard University while attaining her Bachelor of Arts cum laude Social Relations & Cultural Anthropology. At the University of California at Berkeley, she obtained a Master of Arts Adult Education & Humanistic Psychology. She obtained a PhD in 2006 from Columbia University in New York City.

== Work experience ==
She lives in Uganda and works across the continent of Africa. She is an adult educator who raises people’s political consciousness around gender and macroeconomic injustice. Thelma is a trained facilitator. She worked as the Deputy Director at UNIFEM since 1990. She was also employed as the Chief at Africa Section, UNIFEM, New York. She worked as a Consultant at UNIFEM, ILCO of Netherlands, United Nations Children's Fund, and United States Agency for International Development, since 1981.

Thelma also worked as the Executive Secretary, Commission for Communication Education, World Association for Christian Communication, London, 1977–1981. From 1973 to 1977, she served as the Lecturer at the College of Adult and Distance Education at University of Nairobi, Kenya. Between, 1965–1972, she was the Senior Tutor at the Centre for Continuing Education, Makerere University, Uganda teaching Sociology. She completed a two-year term as Assistant Secretary-General of the United Nations.

She is the executive director of the Institute for Social Transformation (IST), and also serves as Counsellor General for the Government of Liberia in Uganda. She influences policy and action across the continent. She worked as the Assistant Secretary General responsible for UNDP’s Africa Bureau based in New York. Thelma Awori is the Board Chairperson of Africa Leadership Institute. She is the Honorary Consul of Liberia to Uganda.

She is a former assistant secretary general of the United Nations and also director of the Regional Bureau for Africa of the UN Development Programme (UNDP). She served the United Nations for 12 years, as deputy director for UNIFEM and as resident coordinator of the UN System in Zimbabwe. From 1965, She has been an active participant in the just struggle of the Women of Uganda for gender equality and that is why on 8 March 2018, she was one of the 10 women recognized and honored for making Uganda proud in various fields of human endeavor in the Country.

She is the Founding Chair and Co-President, Sustainable Market Women's Fund, Liberia formerly (Sirleaf Market Women's Fund) which has directly and indirectly empowered over 15,000 market women in Liberia

She is also the Board Chairperson of Crested Capital, trading as Crested Stocks and Securities Limited, a licensed stock broker and a trading member of the Uganda Securities Exchange.

== Other responsibilities ==
She belongs to the Membership of African Association for Literacy and Adult Education, Nairobi, and American Society for Training and Development. She is a member of the Steering Committee of the African Women's Leadership Network where she coordinates programs that empower women in agriculture and support women market vendors across the continent.

== Personal details ==
She was married to Aggrey Awori who was the Minister for Information and Communications Technology in the Cabinet of Uganda from 16 February 2009 to 27 May 2011. Aggrey Awori and Thelma Awori met at Harvard University, US, during 1960s when they were students at Harvard University.

== See also ==
- Aggrey Awori
- Margaret C. Snyder
- Angelina Wapakhabulo
- Pumla Kisosonkole
