= Calestous Juma =

Kenyan academic

- Born: 9 June 1953; Kenya
- Died: 15 December 2017 (aged 64); Boston, Massachusetts
- Education: University of Sussex (D.Phil)
- Occupations: Professor, author
- Known for: Science, technology and innovation for sustainable development

Calestous Juma FRS HonFREng (9 June 1953 – 15 December 2017) was a Kenyan scientist and academic, specializing in sustainable development. He was named one of the most influential 100 Africans in 2012, 2013 and 2014 by the New African magazine. He was Professor of the Practice of International Development and Faculty Chair of the Innovation for Economic Development Executive Program at Harvard Kennedy School. Juma was Director of the School's Science, Technology and Globalization Project at Harvard Kennedy School as well as the Agricultural Innovation in Africa Project funded by the Bill and Melinda Gates Foundation.

For his work in the application of science, technology and innovation to policy and sustainable development, BMGF in 2021 launched a fellowship in his honour, the Calestous Juma Science Leadership Fellowship to fund exemplary African scientific leaders. ''For this Fellowship, "leadership" is demonstrated by scientists who have the expertise to do transformative science on the ground and the experience, networks, and skills to anchor health and development R&D in their communities, design or co-design projects with local and global partners, and mobilize key institutions in their countries. His last book, Innovation and Its Enemies: Why People Resist New Technologies, was published by Oxford University Press in 2016.

Juma was elected to the Royal Society of London, the US National Academy of Sciences, Third World Academy of Sciences (TWAS), the UK Royal Academy of Engineering, the African Academy of Sciences and the New York Academy of Sciences.

== Early life and education ==
Juma grew up on the Kenyan shores of Lake Victoria, where he obtained early education as one of the pioneer students of the Port Victoria Secondary School (now John Osogo SS) from 1968 to 1971. He first worked as an elementary school teacher before becoming Africa's first science and environment journalist at Kenya's Daily Nation newspaper. Juma later joined the Nairobi-based Environment Liaison Centre International as a founder and editor of trilingual quarterly magazine, Ecoforum. He later received an MSc in Science, Technology and Industrialization and a DPhil in Science and Technology Policy from the Science Policy Research Unit at the University of Sussex.

== Leadership ==
In 1988, Juma founded the African Centre for Technology Studies, Africa's first independent policy research institution designed to advance research on technology in development. In 1989 ACTS released a groundbreaking study called "Innovation and Sovereignty" that led to the adoption of the Industrial Property Act in Kenya and the creation of the Kenya Industrial Property Office.

== Policy research ==
His original work focused on analysing the dynamics of evolutionary technological change and applying the results in advancing science and technology policy research, providing high-level science and technology advice, and promoting biodiversity conservation.

=== Technological innovation ===
Juma made significant contributions to understanding the dynamic role of technological innovation in economic transformation in developing countries. He developed the concept of "evolutionary technological change" to explain how socio-economic environments shape the adoption and diffusion of new technologies. This approach was elaborated in his early works such as Long-Run Economics: An Evolutionary Approach to Economic Growth (Pinter, 1987) and The Gene Hunters: Biotechnology and the Scramble for Seeds (Princeton University Press and Zed Books, 1989) and remains central to theoretical and practical work. Juma's contributions to science and technology policy focused on the role of technological innovation in sustainable development.

=== Biotechnology ===
He directed the International Diffusion of Biotechnology Programme of the International Federation of Institutes of Advanced Studies. He further provided international leadership in research, training and outreach through Harvard University's Kennedy School of Government and also advanced scholarship in this field as editor of the peer-reviewed International Journal of Technology and Globalisation.

=== Biological diversity ===
Juma contributed to biodiversity conservation in two ways. First, he helped to shape global conservation programmes during his tenure as the first permanent Executive Secretary of the Convention on Biological Diversity in Geneva and Montreal. Second, his research inspired the field of biodiplomacy that focuses on interactions between biosciences and international relations.

=== Property rights ===
Juma's research helped to improve understanding on the role of property rights in conservation under the rubric of "ecological jurisprudence" as outlined in the volume, In Land We Trust (Zed, 1996). His work guided international negotiations on the United Nations Convention on Biological Diversity (CBD) as documented in Biodiplomacy (ACTS, 1994). He later became Executive Secretary of the CBD where he advanced the use of scientific knowledge in conservation policy and practice.

== Teaching ==
Juma taught graduate courses on the role of science, technology, and innovation in development policy. The first course focused on the role of technological innovation in economic growth with emphasis on emerging regions of the world. The second course examined the policy implications of the introduction of new biotechnology products in the global economy (covering health, agriculture, industry and environment). He also taught an executive course for senior policy makers and practitioners. The Innovation executive program ran annually for high-level leaders from government, academia, industry, and civil society on how to integrate science and technology into a national development policy.

== Policy advice ==
Juma chaired the Global Challenges and Biotechnology of the US National Academy of Sciences and served as co-chair of the African High-Level Panel on Modern Biotechnology of the African Union (AU) and the New Partnership for Africa's Development (NEPAD).

Juma led international experts in outlining ways to apply science and technology to the implementation of the Millennium Development Goals arising from the 2000 UN Millennium Summit. Innovation: Applying Knowledge in Development (Earthscan, 2005), the report of the Task Force on Science, Technology and Innovation of the UN Millennium Project, was released in early 2005 and its recommendations have been adopted by development agencies and governments around the world. The report has become a standard reference against which governments assess their policies and programmes on the role of technological innovation in development.

In a successor study called Going for Growth, Juma proposes that international development policy should be directed at building technical competence in developing countries rather than conventional relief activities. He argues that institutions of higher learning, especially universities, should have a direct role in helping to solve development challenges.

In 2012 Juma was appointed by the African Union to chair its High-Level Panel on Science, Technology and Innovation. The report of the panel will be submitted to the AU in early 2014.

== Controversy ==
In August 2013 Monsanto approached Juma with a proposal to write a series of seven papers in support of genetically modified organisms, according to e-mails obtained through a public records request, per the Boston Globe. Monsanto suggested a headline "Consequences of Rejecting GM crops". In December 2014, Juma published "Global Risks of Rejecting Agricultural Biotechnology" on a website called "Genetic Literacy Project, Science trumps ideology" with the help of a Monsanto marketing firm and failed to disclose his communication with them.

== Scientific and engineering academies ==
- Fellow, Royal Society of London
- Foreign Associate, US National Academy of Sciences, Washington, D.C.
- Fellow, The World Academy of Sciences, Trieste, Italy
- Honorary Fellow, Royal Academy of Engineering, London
- Fellow, African Academy of Sciences, Nairobi, Kenya
- Fellow, World Academy of Art and Science, USA
- Fellow, New York Academy of Sciences

== Honors and awards ==
- 2013 Doctor of Science (Honorary), McGill University, Montreal, Canada
- 2012 50th Anniversary Fellow, University of Sussex, UK
- 2012 Doctor of Science (Honorary), Jomo Kenyatta University of Agriculture and Technology, Nairobi, Kenya (for work on agricultural biotechnology).
- 2007 Honorary Fellow of the Royal Academy of Engineering
- 2007 Doctor of Science (Honorary), University of Education, Winneba, Ghana ("illustrious and inspiring role as an internationally-recognized authority and leader in the application of science and technology to sustainable development in both developing and developed countries").
- 2006 Doctor of Science (Honorary), University of Sussex, UK (for his work on the applications of science and technology in developing and developed countries).
- 2006 Order of the Elder of the Burning Spear, President of the Republic of Kenya (for being a respected international diplomat who has assisted governments to solve diplomatic problems).
- 2001 Henry Shaw Medal, Missouri Botanical Garden (for significant contribution to botanical research, horticulture, conservation or the museum community).
- 1993 Global 500 Roll of Honour for Environmental Achievement, United Nations Environment Programme (for important contributions made to Africa's quest for solutions to the complex issues of biotechnology, biodiversity and the transfer of technology).
- 1992 Justinian Rweyemamu Prize, Council for the Development of Social Science Research in Africa (CODESRIA) (for broadening Africa's knowledge base for development).
- 1991 Pew Scholars Award in Conservation and the Environment, Pew Charitable Trusts (for dedication in preserving global biodiversity).

== Editorial boards of refereed journals ==
- Editor, International Journal of Technology and Globalization (2003– )
- Editor, International Journal of Biotechnology (1999– )
- Member, Research Policy (2006– )
- Member, Technovation (2006– )
- Associate editor, International Journal of Technology Transfer and Commercialisation (1999– )
- Member, International Journal of Technology Management and Sustainable Development (2002– )
- Member, International Journal of Global Environmental Issues (2000– )
- Member, International Environmental Agreements (2001–2003)
- Member, Science and Public Policy (1989– )
- Member, Africa (1987–1998)

== Special assignments ==
African Union (2012– )
Co-chair, High-Level Panel on Science, Technology and Innovation.
United Nations Development Programme (2011–2012)
Member of the advisory group of the Africa Human Development Report, 2012: Towards a Food-Secure Future.
World Bank (2008–2009)
Served as advisor and made substantial contributions on technological innovation to the preparation of the World Bank's World Development Report, 2010: Development and Climate Change.
Africa Schools of Kenya (2009)
Narrated Maasai: At the Crossroads, a documentary about enriching the lives of Maasai children through education while respecting their customs, traditions, and way of life.
International Whaling Commission (2007–2008)
Served as Special Advisor to the International Whaling Commission by helping to find solutions to the whaling controversy and inspiring the international community to solve other major global environmental challenges.
African Union and New Partnership for Africa's Development (NEPAD) (2005–2008)
Co-chair, High-Level African Panel on Modern Biotechnology, created to provide high-level strategic advice on the role of biotechnology in economic development to African presidents.
Office of the President, Kenya (2004–2006)
Member, National Economic and Social Council (NESC). The council provides high-level advice to the President of the Republic of Kenya.
United Nations Development Programme (2001–2006)
Co-chair of the Task Force on Science, Technology and Innovation of the United Nations Millennium Project commissioned by the United Nations Secretary-General.
United Nations Development Programme (2001)
Served as Principal Consultant for the United Nations Development Programme's Human Development Report 2001 on "Making New Technologies Work for Human Development" and contributed written material for two of the chapters.
Government of Finland (1999)
Chaired an International Mid-Term review Panel for the Finnish Biodiversity Research Programme (FIBRE) under the auspices of the Academy of Finland.
United States Agency for International Development (1995)
Assisted the United States Agency for International Development (USAID) in determining options for supporting natural resource management activities in Kenya.
United Nations Environment Programme (1994)
Served as a member of the Global Environment Facility (GEF) Transition Planning Team for UNEP. The task involved working with senior professionals in developing an implementation strategy and work Program for realising UNEP's mandate in the Facility.
Centre for Our Common Future (1991–92)
Prepared background documents used for reconvening the World Commission on Environment and Development (WCED) chaired by Gro Harlem Brundtland. The Commission delivered a statement at the 1992 United Nations Conference on Environment and Development (UNCED) in Rio de Janeiro, Brazil.
Government of Kenya (1991)
Assisted the Government of Kenya in preparing draft revisions of the Non-Governmental Organisations Coordination Act as well as draft regulations for the implementation of the Act.
Government of Kenya (1989)
Prepared policy papers and drafted the Industrial Property Bill for the Kenya Government. The Parliament of Kenya adopted the Bill in 1989 and the Kenya Industrial Property Office (KIPO) was established in early 1990.
The Economist Intelligence Unit, London (1986)
Preparation of the quarterly reports of the Economist Intelligence Unit on Kenya.

== Boards and committees ==
- The Aga Khan University Board (2013– )
- The Queen Elizabeth Prize for Engineering Judging Panel (2012–17)
- Rolex Awards for Enterprise Jury (2011–12)
- London International Development Centre Board (2010–13)
- WWF International Board (2009–2012)
- Committee on Grand Challenges in International Development, US National Academy of Sciences (2011–13)
- Science and Technology in Society Forum, Japan, International Advisory Council (2008–11)
- Steering Committee of the Roundtable for Technology, Science, and Peacebuilding, US National Academy of Engineering and US Institute for Peace (2011– )
- Strengthening America's Future Initiative, Center for the Study of the Presidency and Congress, USA, committee member (2008–09)
- US National Academy of Sciences, Committee on Geographical Sciences, Member (2007–09)
- World Economic Forum's Technology Pioneers Selection Committee (2007– )
- One Laptop per Child Foundation Board (2007–12)
- National Science and Technology Development Agency, Thailand, International Advisory Council (2007–09)
- Encyclopedia of Life, USA, Board (2007–2010)
- John Sloan Dickey Center for Human Understanding, Dartmouth College, Board (2006–2008)
- EARTH University, Costa Rica, Board (2006–2008)
- National Economic and Social Council, Kenya, Member (2004–2006)
- US National Academy of Engineering, Committee on Grand Challenges for engineering (2006–2008)
- US National Academy of Sciences, Committee on Lost Crops of Africa: Fruits and Vegetables (2003–2008)
- Public Library of Science, San Francisco, Board (2003–2006)
- Belfer Center for Science and International Affairs, Harvard Kennedy School, Board (2002– )
- MacArthur Foundation, Research and Writing Selection Committee (2002–2003)
- US National Academy of Sciences, Roundtable on Science and Technology for Sustainability, Member (2002–2008)
- Committee on African Studies, Harvard University, Member (2001– )
- US National Academy of Sciences, Committee for the Survey and Analysis of Science Advice on Sustainable Development to International Organizations (2001–2002).
- US National Academy of Sciences, Committee on Geographical Foundations of Agenda 21 (2001–2002)
- Canadian Program on Genomics and Global Health, University of Toronto, Advisory Board, (2001–present)
- Center for Health and the Environment, Harvard Medical School, Advisory Board (2000–2002)
- Board on Agriculture and Natural Resources, National Research Council (2000–2003)
- US National Academy of Sciences, Standing Committee on Agricultural Biotechnology, Health and the Environment, (2000–2006)
- Millennium Ecosystem Assessment, Steering Committee (1998–2001)
- United Nations Environment Programme, High-Level Advisory Panel on Biodiversity to the Executive Director (1994–1995)
- Manor House Agricultural Center, Kenya, Board (1994–1995).
- Gulbenkian Commission on the Restructuring of the Social Sciences, Lisbon, Member (1994–1995).
- Green Globe Yearbook, Fridtjof Nansen Institute, Norway, Advisory Panel (1994–1997).
- World Resources Institute, Washington, D.C., Board (1993–2002).
- Center for International Environmental Law, Washington, D.C., Board of Advisors (1994–2000).
- International Development Research Centre (IDRC) and the Swedish Agency for Research Cooperation with Developing Countries (SAREC),
- International Consultative Group on Sustainable Development (1993–1995).
- Global Environment Facility's Scientific and Technical Panel (STAP), Roster of Experts on Biodiversity (1993–1995).
- Kenya National Council for Science and Technology, Specialist Committee on Industrial Sciences (1994–1995).
- World Resources Institute, Washington, D.C., Council Member (1992–1994).
- United Nations Conference on Trade and Development, Geneva, Steering Group of the Technical Assistance Project on the International Trade Programmes (1992–1994).
- United Nations Conference on Environment and Development Secretariat, Geneva, Working Party on Biological Diversity (1990–1992).
- United Nations Conference on Environment and Development Secretariat, Geneva, Working Party on Environmentally-sound Technologies (1990–1992).
- United Nations University's Institute for New Technologies, Maastricht, The Netherlands, Board (1991–1992).
- Biodiversity Conservation Strategy Programme, Washington, D.C., International Coordinating Group (1991–1993).
- Biofuture Foundation, Stockholm, Sweden, Board (1990–1992).
- Initiatives Limited, Kenya, Board (1988–1999).
- Keystone Center, Colorado, USA, International Steering Committee on the International Dialogue Series on Biological Diversity and Genetic Resources (1987–1989).
- Hubert H. Humphrey Institute of Public Affairs, University of Minnesota, USA, International Committee on Rethinking International Governance (1987–1992).

== Selected publications ==
- 2016 Innovation and Its Enemies: Why People Resist New Technologies. Oxford University Press, ISBN 978-0190467036
- 2011. The New Harvest: Agricultural Innovation in Africa. Oxford University Press, New York.
- 2007. Freedom to Innovate: Biotechnology in Africa's Development. Report of the High-Level African Panel on Modern Biotechnology. African Union, Addis Ababa, Ethiopia (with Ismail Serageldin)
- 2007. Science and Innovation in Africa: New Strategies for Economic Growth. Special Issue of the International Journal of Technology and Globalisation, Vol. 2, No. 3/4.
- 2006. Redesigning African Economies: The Role of Engineering in International Development. 2006 Hinton Lecture, Royal Academy of Engineering, London.
- 2006. Lost Crops of Africa: Volume II, Vegetables. National Academy Press, Washington, D.C. (Contributor to a Study of the National Research Council as committee member).
- 2006. Reinventing African Economies: Technological Innovation and the Sustainability Transition. 6th John Pesek Colloquium on Sustainable Agriculture, Iowa State University, Ames, Iowa, USA.
- 2005. Going for Growth: Science, Technology and Innovation in Africa. The Smith Institute, London.
- 2005. Innovation: Applying Knowledge in Development. United Nations Millennium Project. Earthscan Publications (with Lee Yee-Cheong).
- 2002. Knowledge and Diplomacy: Science Advice in the United Nations System. National Academy Press, Washington, D.C. (Contributor to a Study of the National Research Council as committee member).
- 2002. Down to Earth: Geographical Information for Sustainable Development in Africa. National Academy Press, Washington, D.C. (Contributor to a Study of the National Research Council as committee member).
- 1996. In Land We Trust: Environment, Private Property and Constitutional Change. Zed Books, London and Initiatives Publishers, Nairobi (with J. B. Ojwang).
- 1995. Economic Policy Reforms and the Environment: African Experiences. United Nations Environment Programme, Geneva (with Hugh Monteith, Hartmut Krugmann, Tobias Angura, Herbert Acquay, Akino Anthony E., Philip Wandera and John Mugabe).
- 1994. Coming to Life: Biotechnology in African Economic Recovery. Acts Press Nairobi and Zed Books, London (with John Mugabe and Patricia Kameri-Mbote).
- 1994. Biodiplomacy: Genetic Resources and International Relations. Acts Press, Nairobi (with Vicente Sánchez).
- 1993. The Adaptive Economy: Economic Crisis and Technological Change. Acts Press, Nairobi (with C. Torori and C. C. M. Kirima).
- 1991. Biotechnology and Sustainable Development: Policy Options for Developing Countries. Acts Press, Nairobi (with Norman Clark).
- 1991. A Change in the Weather: African Perspectives on Climatic Change. Acts Press, Nairobi (with S. H. Ominde).
- 1989. The Gene Hunters: Biotechnology and the Scramble for Seeds. Zed Press, London and Princeton University Press.
- 1989. Innovation and Sovereignty: The Patent Debate in African Development. African Centre for Technology Studies, Nairobi (with J. B. Ojwang).
- 1989. Gaining Ground: Institutional Innovations in Land-use Management in Kenya. Acts Press, Nairobi (with Amos Kiriro).
- 1989. Biotechnological Diversity and Innovation: Conserving and Utilizing Genetic Resources in Kenya. Acts Press, Nairobi.
- 1987. Long-Run Economics: An Evolutionary Approach to Economic Growth. Pinter Publishers, London (with Norman Clark).
