= Roxanna Carrillo =

Peruvian activist and feminist

- Education: National University of San Marcos
- Occupations: Activist and feminist

Roxanna Carrillo is a Peruvian activist and feminist. Carrillo has worked for the United Nations for around twenty years. She was involved in the United Nations Development Fund for Women (UNIFEM) where she studied gender based violence and its effect on women around the world.

== Biography ==
Carrillo studied literature and linguistics at the Universidad Nacional Mayor de San Marcos. Carrillo earned her master's degree in political science from Rutgers University. Carrillo began a relationship with Charlotte Bunch that was both professional and personal in 1983. The two worked on feminist projects in Latin America and have been together for more than thirty years.

== Work ==
Carrillo is one of the founders of the Flora Tristán Peruvian Women's Center, a feminist organization.

Carrillo was responsible for bringing the issue of violence against women to international prominence at the United Nations (UN) in the early 1990s. In 1991, she wrote a research paper for the Human Rights Commission on this topic and how violence affected women's lives. Later, Carrillo was hired by the United Nations Development Fund for Women (UNIFEM) as a consultant on violence against women. Carrillo's research at UNIFEM found that worldwide, a lack of economic opportunity was at the root of many different forms of violence against women. This research (Battered Dreams: Violence Against Women as an Obstacle to Development), in addition to work done by Charlotte Bunch, was the basis of "mandating a broader focus for UNIFEM in the early 1990s." In 1993, she was part of the group that put "women's rights as human rights" on the agenda for the World Conference on Human Rights in Vienna. Carrillo worked for the United Nations for around twenty years.
