= Mary Okelo =

Kenyan banker and entrepreneur

- Born: Elizabeth Mary Awori; Busia, Kenya
- Education: Makerere University (BA)
- Occupation: Banker
- Spouse: Pius Alois Okelo
- Relatives: Aggrey Awori (brother); Moody Awori (brother); Wycliffe Wasya Work Awori (brother)

Mary Okelo (born Elizabeth Mary Awori) is a Kenyan banker and entrepreneur, best known for becoming the first African woman bank manager for Barclays while working at the Barclays Bank of Kenya in 1977. Okelo is also known for co-founding the private education institution Makini Schools, and for her roles as senior adviser to the African Development Bank and the vice-president of Women's World Banking.

Okelo is the sister of Ugandan politician Aggrey Awori and Kenyan politicians Moody and Wycliffe Wasya Work Awori.

== Early life ==
Born Elizabeth Mary Awori in the town of Busia on the border on Kenya and Uganda, Okelo is the fourteenth of seventeen children of Anglican minister Jeremiah Musungu Awori and nurse Mariamu Awori. Her siblings include Ugandan politician Aggrey Awori and Kenyan politicians Moody and Wycliffe Wasya Work Awori.

== Education ==
As a child, Okelo attended Nambale Anglican Church Primary School, Butere Church Mission Society School, and Alliance Girls High School, becoming one of only thirteen female Kenyan students selected to participate in advanced pre-university courses at the latter school. After graduating high school, Okelo spent a year working as a prison guard before pursuing a Bachelor of Arts degree in history at Makerere University in Uganda.

== Career ==
Okelo joined the Barclays Bank management trainee program in July 1967 after several unsuccessful applications, becoming the first African woman to enter the program. The training involved two years of diploma studies in banking at the British Institute of Bankers in London, where she lived from 1967 to 1969. Upon returning to Kenya Okelo began working at Barclays as a manager's assistant, later being promoted to sub-manager. In 1973 she was offered a promotion to become the manager at a Barclays branch in Nakuru, however, Okelo turned this promotion down in order to remain with her family in Nairobi.

In 1977 she was appointed manager of the then-struggling Westlands Barclays branch, becoming the first woman in Kenya to hold such a position. While working at Barclays Okelo founded the Barclays Bank Women's Association to support female bankers. In the early 1980s she co-founded the Kenya Women's Finance Trust (KFWT), an affiliate of Women's World Banking, with her sister Christine Hayanga. Okelo worked full-time at Barclays until 1985, when she was appointed the first African regional representative to Women's World Banking.

In 1987 she moved to Abidjan in Côte d'Ivoire to serve as the first female senior adviser to the president of the African Development Bank, and in 1990 she was appointed the vice-president of Women's World Banking.

In 1978 Okelo and her husband established Riara Gardens Academy, a private nursery school that initially served 8 students and operated out of Okelo's home. Later renamed the Makini School, the operation expanded throughout the 1980s to cover all levels of primary education after erecting a dedicated school building in 1982. In the 1990s the operation split into three schools (Makini Lower Primary School, Makini Middle Primary School, and Makini Upper Primary School) occupying separate buildings and becoming collectively known as Makini Schools. Makini Schools expanded to offer secondary education in 1997, and an International Baccalaureate (IB) program was launched in 1998.

== Personal life ==
Okelo met her husband, Pius Alois Okelo, during her banking studies in London. The pair married in 1968, in a London wedding attended by Okelo's siblings and the then Kenyan High Commissioner to Britain Josephat Karanja, and had three children. Pius Okelo was killed in a car accident in 2004.
