= Yusuf Chanzu =

Kenyan politician

Yusuf Kifuma Chanzu is a Kenyan politician from Vihiga Constituency. He was elected to represent the Vihiga Constituency in the National Assembly of Kenya since the 1997 to 2002 and 2007 to 2013 Kenyan parliamentary election.

He was educated at Kakamega School.
