= Margaret C. Snyder =

American social scientist (1929–2021)

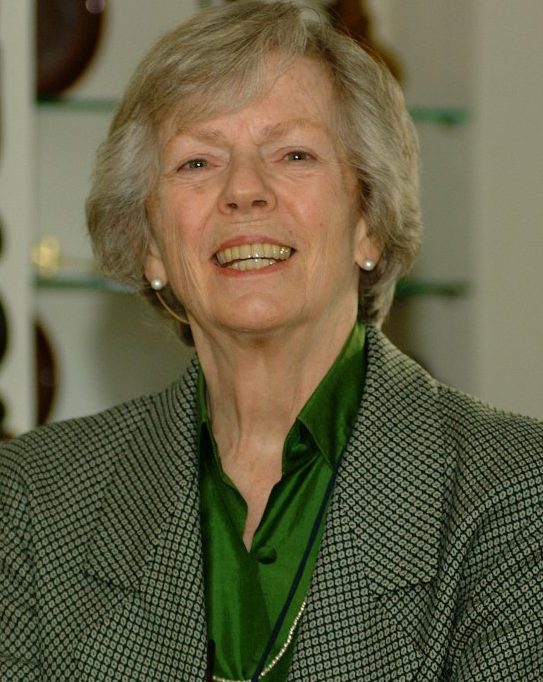
- Born: January 30, 1929; Syracuse, New York
- Died: January 26, 2021 (aged 91); New York, New York
- Education: College of New Rochelle; Catholic University of America; University of Dar es Salaam

Margaret C. "Peg" Snyder (January 30, 1929 – January 26, 2021) was an American social scientist with a special interest in women and economic development, particularly in Africa. She was the founding director of the United Nations Development Fund for Women (UNIFEM), which was absorbed into UN Women in 2011. She was also a co-founder of Women's World Banking and of the African Training and Research Centre for Women.

== Biography ==
Snyder was born in Syracuse, New York, in 1929. As a young woman, she attended the College of New Rochelle, receiving a bachelor's degree in 1950, and the Catholic University of America, where she received a master's degree in sociology in 1952. Her M.S. thesis at Catholic University was a study of potential effects of the proposal for an Equal Rights Amendment to the U.S. Constitution. In 1953 she became dean of women for Le Moyne College in Syracuse, a position she held for eight years.

A sabbatical-year in Africa in 1961 changed the course of her career. Invited by the Kenya African Women's Association to work with African women in Kenya, she initially assisted the "Kennedy Airlifts" that brought students to American colleges in preparation for Kenyan independence in 1964. Kenyan women, led by Margaret Kenyatta (daughter of Jomo Kenyatta, who would be the nation's first president) then sought her assistance with planning a Kenya Women's Seminar to consult women from throughout the country about what roles women should play in an independent Kenya. After two national seminars, Tanganyika and Uganda were included in an East African Women's Seminar.

When her sabbatical year was over, Snyder decided to give up her position at Le Moyne in order to stay on in Africa, where, sponsored by the Women's Africa Committee, she would serve as an adviser to Umoja wa Wanawake wa Tanganyika (UWT) and continue her work with various groups in Kenya and Tanganyika. In 1965 she became assistant director for the Programme of Eastern African Studies of Syracuse University's Maxwell School, and was assigned as field director of their Ford Foundation assisted doctoral dissertation research on village settlements in Tanzania, with an opportunity to complete her own dissertation research there. She also worked as a consultant to the State University of New York, and for the American Council on Education.

Snyder returned to Tanzania (the new name for the union of Tanganyika and Zanzibar) in 1970 to complete her research while tutoring students. In 1971 she received a Ph.D. in sociology from the University of Dar es Salaam in Tanzania. That same year she joined the United Nations (UN) staff as regional adviser for the Economic Commission for Africa (ECA) in a post sponsored by the Swedish International Development Agency aimed to create an African Regional Programme on Advancement of Women. In that position, she was responsible for the first data base of statistics on women to include an entire geographical region, for itinerant training courses for rural development workers from governments and NGOs, seminars on the creation of "national machineries" such as women's bureaux and national commissions on women, national bibliographies of writings about women, and other activities. She was a co-founder of ECA's African Training and Research Centre for Women, which was to become a model for similar women's programs worldwide, while she also served as first head of the commission's Voluntary Agencies Bureau.

In 1978 Snyder accepted a position with the United Nations, New York, to be the first director of the Voluntary Fund for the UN Decade for Women (VFDW), later renamed the United Nations Development Fund for Women (UNIFEM). In that position she expanded the scope of her activities beyond Africa to include Asia, the Pacific, Latin America, and the Caribbean. UNIFEM started innovative and experimental programs aimed at improving women's situation and status throughout the world. Its major fields of concentration were economic and political empowerment. For example, it was the first to provide a large scale grant to the Green Belt Movement of Kenya, whose leader, Professor Wangari Maathai, would receive the Nobel Peace Prize. It financed training of women as labor leaders in Latin America, and silk producers in Asia.

Once programs such as these were evaluated as effective, many were adopted or replicated by major funds including the UN Development Programme (UNDP) and the World Bank. Two types of activities pioneered by UNIFEM for the whole UN system were direct support to national non-governmental organizations rather than solely to governments, and creation of revolving loan funds owned by community groups. Initially administratively located in the Centre for Social Development and Humanitarian Affairs, VFDW moved as UNIFEM to autonomous association with the UNDP in 1985. It worked in cooperation with organizations such as UNICEF and UNDP in the UN system, non-governmental organizations and national governments of low income countries, and national development investment programs such as USAID, SIDA and Canadian CIDA. Its resources came entirely from voluntary contributions rather than from the assessed contributions of governments to the United Nations.

UNIFEM faced two major obstacles during its initial decade under Snyder's leadership. Although units/programs directed to women's advancement were being established at national levels, the UN's institutionalizing the growing world concern for equity and justice for women through VFDW/UNIFEM was not yet fully understood by many senior UN and UNDP staff, who sought to move it away from UN headquarters and/or locate it at administratively low levels. The other major obstacle arose when some politicians successfully sought the withdrawal of the US government's annual contributions to its core resources (but not to those of its Middle East project partner, UNICEF). Pressure from the Consultative Committee to the Fund, led by Therese Spens of UK, and from a group of NGOs, led to restoration of the US contribution, but at a lower level.

Snyder retired from UNIFEM in 1989. Following her retirement, she continued to serve as senior advisor to the UN and the United Nations Development Programme. In 1992-93 she was a visiting fellow at Princeton University's Woodrow Wilson School of Public and International Affairs and traveled worldwide to visit activities sponsored by UNIFEM a decade before, with grants from the Ford and Rockefeller Foundations. She wrote the histories of the African Training and Research Centre for Women at UNECA (with co-author Mary Tadesse) and of UNIFEM. She then received a Fulbright award to allow her to spend the 1994–95 academic year teaching at the newly established Women's Studies Programme for MA candidates at Makerere University in Uganda.

In late 2006, Snyder, her former UNIFEM colleague Dr Thelma Awori, and colleagues laid the foundations for the Sirleaf Market Women's Fund, which honors Africa's first elected woman President and assists Liberia to restore community markets and provide education and financial support to market women after 14 years of civil war. She was also a member of the Board of the Green Belt Movement International that supports Kenya's Green Belt Movement by sponsoring information activities and mobilizes resources for the work in Kenya. She was an International Election Observer in 1992 in Ethiopia; 1995 in Tanzania; 1996 in Uganda; and 2000 in Zanzibar. She died on January 26, 2021.

== Selected books ==
Margaret Snyder is the author or co-author of several books, including:

- Margaret C. Snyder and Mary Tadesse. African women and development: A history. Witwatersrand University Press, 1995. ISBN 9781856492997.
- Margaret Snyder. Transforming Development: Women, poverty and politics - UNIFEM's First Fifteen Years. London: Intermediate Technology Publ., 1995. ISBN 9781853393020.
- Margaret Snyder. Women in African Economies: From Burning Sun to Boardroom. Fountain Publishers, 2000. ISBN 9789970021871.
- Margaret Snyder with Sarah Kitakule. Above the Odds: A decade of change for Ugandan women entrepreneurs. Africa World Press, NJ, 2011. ISBN 978-1-59221-764-9

== Chapters in books, and journal articles ==
- 'Unlikely Godmother: the UN and the Global Women's Movement' in Ferree, Myra and Aili Mari Tripp, Global Feminism. New York University Press, NY, 2006.
- Walking My Own Road: How a Sabbatical Year Led to a United Nations Career, Fraser, Arvonne and Irene Tinker, in Developing Power. The Feminist Press, NY, 2004.
- Women’s Agency in the Economy: Business and Investment Patterns and Research on Women 1986-2001: an Overview in The Women’s Movement in Uganda: History, Challenges and Prospects. 2002. Kampala, Uganda: Fountain Publishers.
- Women and African Development, bibliographic essay, CHOICE Journal of academic libraries. February 2000.
- Malcolm after Mecca: East Africa 1994, in Commonweal., 18 Dec. 1992.
