= Kakamega School =

Location
- 90 Tsalwa Road, Kakamega, Kenya, 50100
- 0.271593°N 34.745793°E

Information
- Type: Public secondary school
- Motto: In unity is strength
- Established: 1932
- Founder: Harold Arthur Waterloo Chapman
- Principal: Julius Mambili
- Colours: Green, Black and White
- Website: kakamegaschool.sc.ke

Kakamega School, formerly known as Government African School Kakamega and Kakamega High School, is a four-year high school in Kakamega, Western Kenya, founded in 1932.

Mr. Harold Arthur Waterloo Chapman, a graduate of University of Oxford, was made the school principal in August 1931 before its completion and commissioning. He served as the school principal until 1955 when he retired. He later died on the 25 January 1988.

Chapman left a permanent mark in Kakamega school where his name was synonymous with the school. A hostel on the SOWETO side of the boarding section was named after him, and is one of the most popular hostels housing both junior and senior students. To this date, the school is referred to as Chapman's land as mentioned in the school anthem.

Kakamega school is currently categorized by the Ministry of Education as a national school and admits students from across Kenya. However, even before its elevation to a national school, the school would enrol students from every part of the country based on its popularity.

== Notable alumni ==
- W.W.W. Awori – Member of the Legislative Council of Kenya for North Nyanza (1952–1956)
- Moody Awori – 9th Vice President of Kenya
- Najib Balala – Secretary for Tourism
- Yusuf Chanzu – M.P. for the Vihiga Constituency
- Bonny Khalwale – former senator representing Kakamega county
- Newton Kulundu – former Minister for Labour
- Kenneth Marende – former Speaker of the National Assembly of Kenya
- Dennis Oliech – international footballer
- Noah Wekesa – former Minister for Wildlife and Forestry

== See also ==
- Education in Kenya
- List of schools in Kenya
