= Moody Awori =

9th Vice President of Kenya

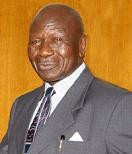

9th Vice President of Kenya
- In office 25 September 2003 – 9 January 2008
- President: Mwai Kibaki
- Preceded by: Michael Kijana Wamalwa
- Succeeded by: Kalonzo Musyoka

Personal details
- Born: 22 November 1927 (age 99) Busia, Kenya
- Spouse: Rose Awori
- Children: 5
- Relatives: W.W.W. Awori (brother); Aggrey Awori (brother); Mary Okelo (sister); Susan Wakhungu-Githuku (niece); Judi Wakhungu (niece)
- Education: Makerere University

Moody Arthur Awori (born 22 November 1927) known as "Uncle Moody", is a former Kenyan politician who served as the ninth Vice President of Kenya from 25 September 2003 to 9 January 2008. He is also the author of Riding on a Tiger, an autobiography about his life in politics.

== Personal life ==
Moody Arthur Awori was born in Butere the capital of the former Butere/Mumias District to Canon Jeremiah Awori and Mariamu Awori. He was one of their 16 children, a good number of whom went on to hold different senior positions in politics, medicine, and other sectors.

Awori's eldest brother, Musa, died of a snake bite in infancy. His older brother, W.W.W. Awori, served on the Legislative Council in the 1950s. His younger brother Aggrey Awori was a politician in Uganda who came third in the presidential elections of 2001. His sister, Mary Okelo, is a founder and CEO of the Makini Schools.

His brother, Professor Nelson Wanyama Awori, led the team that carried out black Africa's first successful kidney transplant which was performed at Nairobi Hospital in 1978. Another brother, Hannington Ochwada Awori, was one of the pioneer civil engineers in Kenya.

Moody Awori attended Mang'u High School, and later joined Kakamega School. Subsequently, he studied at Makerere University in Uganda. He is a devout Roman Catholic.

== Politics ==
Moody Awori was first elected as a Member of Parliament representing Funyula Constituency in Busia District in Western Province in 1983. Under President Daniel arap Moi, he served in several positions as assistant minister.

Awori broke with the ruling party, KANU, in 2002 and joined the National Rainbow Coalition opposition party, and served as chairman of NARC's top decision making organ. When Moi was succeeded by Mwai Kibaki, Awori was made Minister of Home Affairs in January 2003 and then vice-president (while remaining in charge of Home Affairs) in September 2003, following the death of the previous vice-president, Michael Kijana Wamalwa, in London.

In the December 2007 parliamentary election, he lost his parliamentary seat. On 8 January 2008, Kibaki named Kalonzo Musyoka to replace Awori as vice-president and Minister of Home Affairs, and Awori handed over the office on 9 January. Awori, describing Musyoka as "a friend and political son", said that he believed Musyoka was "equal to the task", while Musyoka said that he had "deep respect" for Awori, who he called "a true gentleman".

== Anglo Leasing Scandal ==
Awori was implicated in the Anglo Leasing scandal in a report published on 22 January 2006 by John Githongo. He has insisted upon his innocence and refused to resign, saying he saw no reason to. In February 2006, eighty Members of Parliament demanded his resignation, threatening street protests if their requests were not met. A few days later protestors on the streets of Nairobi called for his resignation as part of a wider anti-corruption demonstration. After this was not achieved, the Social Reform Centre said that he was undermining the integrity of his office by refusing to step down and promised to continue protesting. In a 22 February interview with the Public Accounts Committee Awori blamed civil servants, claiming to have been misled and that he had had nothing to do with any wrongdoing.

== Awards ==
Moody Awori was the founder and chairman of the Association for the Physically Disabled of Kenya,and a member of the Chartered Institute of Secretaries.

He holds an honorary doctor of laws degree from the Southern New Hampshire University in the United States of America.He was awarded the degree in May 2004 in recognition of his many years of dedicated service to the disadvantaged in society, particularly the disabled and the poor. tute of Secretaries.

In recognition of his outstanding contribution to the nation and the society in general, the Kenyan Government decorated him with two high level State awards – Elder of the Burning Spear (EBS) and Elder of the Golden Heart (EGH).

On the eve of his 91st birthday, President Uhuru Kenyatta appointed him the chair of the Sports Funds Board, saying that young people have for far too long been appointed to those positions but failed to stop theft of public funds, so it was time to try an older Kenyan. The President asked Kenyans who thought Uncle Moody was too old for the task to leave him alone.

Political offices
Preceded by Michael Wamalwa Kijana	Vice-President of Kenya; 2003–2008	Succeeded by Kalonzo Musyoka
