= Aggrey Awori =

Ugandan economist and politician (1939–2021)

Hon Aggrey Awori
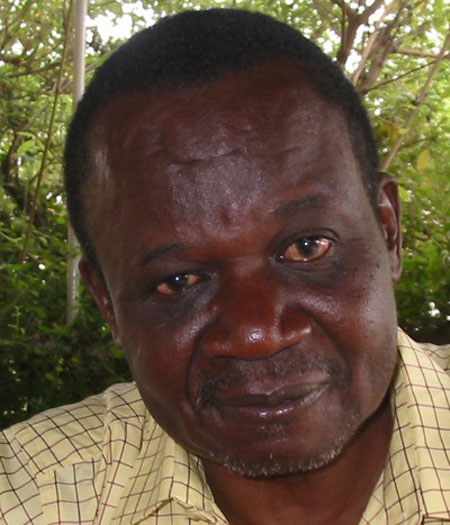
- Born: 23 February 1939; Uganda
- Died: 5 July 2021 (aged 82); Naalya, Kampala, Uganda
- Education: Harvard University (BA, political economics); Syracuse University (MA, economics)
- Occupations: Economist, politician
- Years active: 1967–2011
- Known for: Politics
- Spouse: Thelma Awori
- Relatives: W.W.W. Awori (brother); Moody Awori (brother); Mary Okelo (sister); Susan Wakhungu-Githuku (niece); Judi Wakhungu (niece)

Aggrey Siryoyi Awori (23 February 1939 – 5 July 2021) was a Ugandan economist, politician and Olympic hurdler, who served as Minister for Information and Communications Technology in the Cabinet of Uganda from 16 February 2009 to 27 May 2011. Prior to that, he represented Samia-Bugwe North, Busia District in the Ugandan Parliament from 2001 until 2006. Awori was an outspoken opposition member of parliament for the Uganda People's Congress (UPC) political party. In 2007, he abandoned the UPC and joined the ruling National Resistance Movement.

== Early life and education ==
Aggrey Awori was born on 23rd February 1939, in Budimo village, Busia district, Uganda, near the Uganda-Kenya boarder. He was the tenth of seventeen children born to Canon Jeremiah Musungu Awori, a pioner aglican priest in East Africa, and Mariamu Odongo Awori, a nurse and community teacher.

Awori grew up in a prominent family that produced several notable figures in East Africa. His siblings included Arthur Moody Awori, who later became the vice President of Kenya, and Mary Okelo, a Kenyan banker and educationalist.

He received his early education in Uganda, attending local primary schools before joining Nabumali High School in Mbale district for his secondary education. He later studied at Kings College Budo, where he became known for his academic ability and athletic talent. He also represented Uganda at 1960 Olympics Games in Rome.

== Background ==
Awori was born on 23 February 1939, in Budimo Village, Busia District, near the Ugandan/Kenyan border as the tenth of seventeen children. His parents were Canon Jeremiah Musungu Awori, a pioneer African priest of the Anglican Church in East Africa and Mrs. Mariamu Odongo Awori, a nurse and community teacher. Aggrey's siblings include W.W.W. Awori, a freedom fighter and Member of the Legislative Council of Kenya in pre-Independence Kenya, the ninth Kenyan vice-president Moody Arthur Awori and Mary Okelo, the first woman in East Africa to head a Barclays Bank branch and the founder of the Kenya Women Finance Trust, Kenya's women only bank. Mary is also the founder of Makini Schools, a leading school chain in East Africa.

Awori owned an urban home in Busia Municipality and a country home in neighboring Bugiri District.

== Education ==
Awori attended Nabumali High School in Mbale District and King's College Budo, in Wakiso District, both in Uganda. He was the Canada House Prefect at King's College Budo. While at King's College Budo (1959 to 1961), Aggrey was selected among a few others for elite military officers training at Sandhurst Military College in the United Kingdom. His father Canon Awori, however, rejected the idea of his talented son joining the military. From 1961 to 1965, he studied at Harvard University on a scholarship. The first year he took nuclear physics, but then switched over to political economics.

While at Harvard, Aggrey became the first person in heptagonal track history to win three events - the long jump, high hurdles, and 60-yard dash, tying the heptagonal record in the hurdles and setting the mark in the dash. He also ran on the victorious mile relay team that tied the heptagonal record. By the time he graduated from Harvard, Awori held three outdoor and five indoor school records. He also represented Uganda in the 110 metres hurdles at the 1960 Summer Olympics and the 1964 Summer Olympics, but failed to win any medals.

Awori has a Master of Arts in economics from Syracuse University in the U.S.

when he returned to the country, he caught the eye of the president who appointed him as the director general of Uganda Television. But at the Advent of the 1971 Idi Amin Coup against the Obote I regime, Awori was briefly detained. "I was the first Journalist or media person to be arrested during the coup of January 25, 1971. That nearly ended my life; i had Know Idi Amin for sometime, we had been interacting, he saved me out of his mercies," he said.

== Career ==
In 1967, Awori was appointed the first local director of Uganda Television (UTV). In 1971 Awori was jailed for two months after Idi Amin's coup, because during Amin's first coup attempt he didn't broadcast a speech Amin gave, lying to him by saying that they were live on air. He went into political exile in Kenya, where he taught political journalism at the University of Nairobi until 1976 and then traveled around Africa visiting Tanzania, Liberia and Senegal and returning to Nairobi in 1979.

After Idi Amin was overthrown in 1979, Awori returned to Uganda. He ran for a seat in the National Assembly of Uganda, but lost. He then became Ambassador to the United States, until being transferred by Tito Okello Lutwa in 1985. He served as Uganda's Ambassador to Belgium from 1985 until 1987, when he was dropped by Yoweri Museveni.

After a brief asylum in Nairobi, Awori started to build up a rebel group operating from eastern Uganda named Force Obote Back Again (FOBA). He stated that his reason for doing so was mainly anger at Museveni's National Resistance Army, which had confiscated his property. In 1992, he dissolved his rebel group, which had consisted mainly of young fighters. In 1993, Awori met with Museveni in New York and then was elected to the Constituent Assembly to drawing up the country's new constitution and as a member of parliament.

He came third in the 2001 presidential elections, polling 1.41% of the vote.

He represented Samia-Bugwe North, Busia District in the Ugandan Parliament from 2001 until 2006. Awori was an outspoken opposition member of parliament for the Uganda People's Congress (UPC) political party. In 2007, he abandoned the UPC and joined the ruling National Resistance Movement political party.

He was the Minister for Information & Communications Technology in the Cabinet of Uganda from 16 February 2009 to 27 May 2011. In the cabinet reshuffle of 27 May 2011, he was dropped from the cabinet and replaced by Ruhakana Rugunda. On account of his cabinet post, he was an ex officio Member of the Ugandan Parliament (MP).

== Personal life. ==
Aggrey Awori was married to Thelma Awori, who worked as Director for Africa at the United Nations Development Programme. Together they were the parents of six adult children.

Aggrey Awori, at the age of 82, died from COVID-19 on 5 July 2021, at a private hospital in Naalya, Kampala.
