= United Nations Development Fund for Women =

Subsidiary organ of the United Nations

- Abbreviation: UNIFEM
- Merged into: UN Women
- Parent organization: United Nations

The United Nations Development Fund for Women (UNIFEM; French: Fonds de développement des Nations unies pour la femme; Spanish: Fondo de Desarrollo de las Naciones Unidas para la Mujer) was established in December 1976 originally as the Voluntary Fund for the United Nations Decade for Women in the International Women's Year. Its first director was Margaret C. Snyder. UNIFEM provided financial and technical assistance to innovative programmes and strategies that promoted women's human rights, political participation and economic security. Since 1976 it supported women's empowerment and gender equality through its programme offices and links with women's organizations in the major regions of the world. Its work on gender responsive budgets began in 1996 in Southern Africa and expanded to include East Africa, Southeast Asia, South Asia, Central America and the Andean region. It worked to increase awareness throughout the UN system of gender-responsive budgets as a tool to strengthen economic governance in all countries. In 2011, UNIFEM merged with some other smaller entities to become UN Women.

== About ==
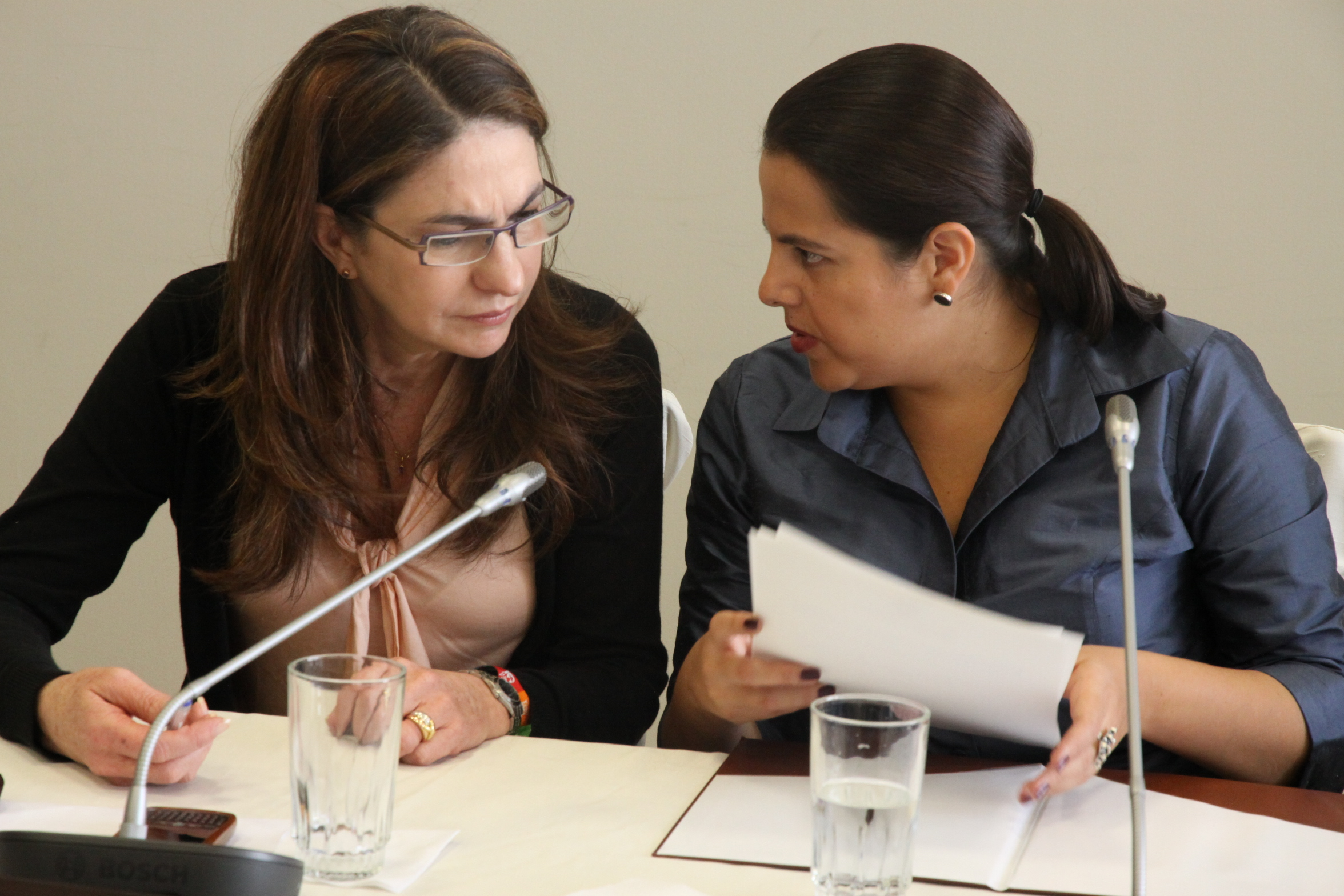
2010 meeting in Ecuador

UNIFEM was an autonomous organization working closely with the UN Development Programme (UNDP), although the resolution also specified that the fund's resources should supplement, not substitute for, the responsibilities of other United Nations development cooperation agencies. UNIFEM helped fund projects that aided women and their families. UNIFEM developed a strategy of aiding women to become their "own agents for change rather than recipients of charity." UNIFEM also helped to ensure that UN programmes followed guidelines developed by the Convention on the Elimination of All Forms of Discrimination against Women (CEDAW). UNIFEM was also involved in recognizing women's rights as human rights. It advocated gender equality around the world. UNIFEM also saw women's rights as an issue of peace and security.

UNIFEM operated on a budget of voluntary contributions to the organization. The organization was based in New York City. Different countries and regions had their own committees within UNIFEM. UNIFEM was one of the smaller agencies at the UN and was situated lower in the UN hierarchy, according to Canadian politician Stephen Lewis.

== History ==
The First World Conference on Women in 1975 influenced the creation of UNIFEM. World governments saw the need to put resources into dealing with women's issues after the First Conference. The United Nations Voluntary Fund for the Decade for Women (UNVFDW) was established by the United Nations General Assembly in December 1976 right after the conference. Margaret Snyder started working as the leader of the organization in 1978.

=== 1980s ===
The UNVFDW was given an expanded mandate by the General Assembly in February 1985, when it became the United Nations Development Fund for Women (UNIFEM). Under resolution 39/125, the new fund was called on to support and advocate for innovative and catalytic activities that would give voice and visibility to the women of the developing world.

Funding for UNIFEM projects doubled in size between 1985 and 1988.

=== 1990s ===
In the 1990s, UNIFEM became involved in broadening its scope. The organization began a campaign to define "women's rights as human rights" and how violence against women was also an economic development issue. UNIFEM hired researchers such as Roxanna Carrillo to demonstrate how violence against women was linked to a lack of women's access to economic opportunity. The campaign for "women's rights as human rights" was especially effective. UNIFEM began working on projects to reduce gender-based violence and also to raise awareness of the problem.

Also in the 1990s, African Women in Crisis (AFWIC) was created by UNIFEM to focus on issues facing people in Africa. AFWIC helped women who were displaced due to violence or emergencies in their own countries. AFWIC expanded on work begun by Laketch Dirasse in East Africa.

The work of UNIFEM helped shape the issues addressed at the Fourth World Conference on Women in 1995. Women at the conference decided that it was important that they "claim formal power to directly shape public policy".

UNIFEM created a trust fund to help support twenty-three projects to combat gender-based violence and war crimes against women. The fund began funding projects in 1997.

=== 2000s ===
UNIFEM was granted "executing agency status" by UNDP in 2000. This allowed the organization to complete and work on projects for UNDP that related to women's rights and gender equality.

UNIFEM released a new biennial report, Progress of the World's Women in 2001. The report outlined what UNIFEM had achieved in previous decades. Also in 2001, in conjunction with International Alert, UNIFEM launched the Millennium Peace Prize for Women.

Noeleen Heyzer, head of UNIFEM, asked for the creation of an international commission on violence against women.

On January 26, 2006, UNIFEM nominated Nicole Kidman as its goodwill ambassador.

The last executive director of UNIFEM was Inés Alberdi.

=== 2010s ===
In January 2011, UNIFEM was merged into UN Women, a composite entity of the UN, with International Research and Training Institute for the Advancement of Women (INSTRAW), Office of the Special Adviser on Gender Issues (OSAGI), and Division for the Advancement of Women (DAW).

== Executive directors ==
Executive directors of the organization have been:

Nr	Director	From country	Term
4.	Inés Alberdi	Spain	2007–2014
3.	Noeleen Heyzer	Singapore	1994–2007
2.	Sharon Capeling-Alakija	Canada	1989–1994
1.	Margaret C. Snyder	United States	1978–1989

== See also ==
- United Nations Decade for Women
- UN Women
