= London International Development Centre =

The London International Development Centre (LIDC) was established in 2007, through funding of £3.7m from HEFCE. LIDC is a collaborative between University of London's Bloomsbury Colleges (Birkbeck, the UCL Institute of Education, the London School of Hygiene & Tropical Medicine, the Royal Veterinary College, and SOAS) and now has 3,000 staff, student and alumni members from its constituent colleges. As of August 2017, Queen Mary, University of London and City, University of London became member colleges of the LIDC.
