= African Centre for Technology Studies =

African non-profit

- Abbreviation: ACTS
- Formation: 1988
- Founder: Calestous Juma FRS
- Founded at: Nairobi, Kenya
- Type: Think Tank
- Purpose: To strengthen the capacity and policies of African countries and institutions to harness science, technology and innovation for sustainable development.
- Headquarters: Crescent Road, Nairobi
- Location: United Nations Cres, Nairobi, Kenya
- Key people: Cosmas Milton Obote Ochieng PhD., Director
- Website: www.acts-net.org/

African Centre for Technology Studies (ACTS) is an intergovernmental non-profit organization, founded in 1988 by Calestous Juma FRS in Nairobi, Kenya, promoting policy-oriented research on science and technology in development that is sustainable in terms of the economy, society, and the environment. It was the first African non-profit organization to combine policy research, science and technology.

== History ==
Founded in 1988, ACTS was a pioneer in development research on innovative development policies related to applied science, technology, and innovation.

ACTS research influenced policies on industrial property legislation and policy in Kenya, environmental impact assessment standards in Eastern and Southern Africa, biofuels and bio-energy in Kenya, Eastern and West Africa. ACTS has also influenced policies across Africa on issues such as climate change adaptation and mitigation, agriculture, biotechnology, biodiplomacy, and biosafety.

== Affiliations ==
ACTS is a member of the Global Partnership for Sustainable Development Data (GPSDD), which includes 150 data producers and users working towards sustainable development focusing on data that informs research ending extreme poverty and addressing climate change. The Canadian, Colombian, French, Ghanaian, Italian, Mexican, Moroccan, Nigerian, Philippine, Senegalese, United Kingdom and United States' governments are member-states of the network.

== Awards ==
In 2013, ACTS was named as one of the top Environment Think Tanks globally. In 1991 the Council for the Development of Social Science Research in Africa (CODESRIA) honored ACTS for its contribution to expanding the knowledge base for development in Africa with the Justinian Rweyemamu Prize, named after Tanzania's first major economics scholar, Justinian Rweyemamu.

== Community-based actions ==
ACTS policy researchers engage with local communities to encourage communities to reflect on and learn from their own coping mechanisms when faced with flood-prone areas. They then choose best practice adaptations and develop long-term proactive strategies for flood mitigation which might include crop diversification.

== Selected publications ==
ACTS published a study by Harvard professor, Calestous Juma and J. B. Ojwang entitled Innovation and Sovereignty: The Patent Debate in African Development. Juma directs the Harvard Kennedy School's (HKS) Agricultural Innovation in Africa Project funded by the Bill and Melinda Gates Foundation.

In his 1993 article, in which Juma examined legal processes regarding access and tenurial issues of pastoral natural resource management in Turkana in Kenya, focusing on tree rights. Edmund G.C. Barrow made a case for indigenous property rights.
