= Biodiplomacy =

Bio-diplomacy is part of the biopolitics theory of professor Agni Vlavianos Arvanitis. According to her, bio-diplomacy is a framework, a political path of the diplomatic world, in organizing and discussing plans and actions for peace and international understanding considering the threats to bios and the environment, between nations worldwide. Bio-diplomacy is involved in enhancing international cooperation in environmental issues and actively supports efforts to maintain biological and cultural diversity. Bio-diplomacy seeks to improve human relations and attain the goal of world peace by replacing the current diplomatic attitudes with a complete international and intercultural perspective. Bio-diplomacy is the diplomacy that adopts the principle of defense for bios as the primary national and international priority. Professor Vlavianos Arvanitis highlights that the pursuit of bio-diplomacy in a coordinated fashion at the international, national, regional, and local levels, will provide for increased cooperation among people across the globe and can encourage international cooperation in environmental protection in issues such as the mitigation of climate change, management of pollution, management of water resources, forests and oceans. Bio-diplomacy recognizes that cultural differentiation constitutes the wealth of the body of humanity, which is part of the body of bios, where DNA, the genetic code for every living organism is the link connecting all forms of life.
