= Susan Wakhungu-Githuku =

Kenyan tennis player and business executive

- Born: Susan Nakhanu Wakhungu; 1960 (age 64–65); Bungoma, British Kenya
- Other names: Susan Nakhanu Wakhungu-Githuku, Susan Wakhungu
- Occupation(s): Tennis player, business executive, writer
- Years active: 1978–present
- Relatives: Judi Wakhungu (sister); Anne Shongwe (sister-in-law); Moody Awori (uncle); Aggrey Awori (uncle)

Susan Wakhungu-Githuku (born 1960) is a Kenyan business executive, writer, and publishing house founder, who in her youth was ranked as Kenya's top women's tennis player. She was born in Bungoma in British Kenya and around the age of 11 moved to Nairobi. While attending Loreto Convent Valley Road High School, she began to play tennis. In 1978, she qualified to play in the Junior girls' singles at the Wimbledon Championships. According to the sports journalist Ross McLean, she was the first Kenyan to play in a Junior Grand Slam tournament and until 2022 was the only Kenyan to have qualified for and played in a Junior Grand Slam event at Wimbledon. At the 1978 All-Africa Games she won the gold medal in women's doubles and the silver medal for the women's singles. While studying at St. Lawrence University in Canton, New York, she played in the college circuit. After winning a women's singles title at the World University Games in Mexico City in 1979, she became Kenya's top women's player. She was the 1983 women's champion at the Robbialac Classic Tournament and won the tournament's women's doubles title with her sister Judi Wakhungu the following year. In 1984, she was the winner of the women's matches at the Kenya Closed Championships and in 1987 won the bronze medal in ladies' doubles at the All-Africa Games, before retiring from tennis.

Wakhungu-Githuku began her professional career working for the Kenyan government as an economist. She then spent a decade working for various non-governmental agencies including the United States Agency for International Development, the Africa Economic Research Consortium, and Care International as a programme director. During this time, she returned to her studies, obtaining a master's degree in research and development planning from the University of Strathclyde in Glasgow, Scotland. At the beginning of the 21st century, she began working at The Coca-Cola Company as human resources director for the Africa Division in London. She later transferred to Johannesburg, South Africa, and was responsible for learning and development for 90 countries. Thereafter she served as the director of Coca-Cola University for Africa and Eurasia, but left the company in 2009 to found Human Performance Dynamics in Nairobi, a business and human resources consultancy. Aspiring to write about successful contemporary Kenyans, but unable to find a publisher for her works, she founded the publishing house Footprints Press in 2010. She has published books on Kenya's development since independence and about notable Kenyan writers, photographers and runners, both men and women. In 2021, she was honoured by the government of Kenya, as a Moran of the Order of the Burning Spear.

== Early life, sports, education, and family ==
Susan Nakhanu Wakhungu was born in 1960, in Bungoma, British Kenya, to Grace (née Awori) and Mathew Sarapayi Wakhungu. Her mother was a teacher and later a businesswoman, who was the sister to Moody Awori, the ninth Deputy President of Kenya, and Aggrey Awori, a former Olympic hurdler and a Member of Parliament in Uganda. Her father was a medic Bungoma. Wakhungu was one of five siblings, including her sister Judi, and brother Ben. She lived briefly at Siriba Teacher's Training College in Maseno, while her parents were abroad and then when she was eleven, moved with her family to Nairobi. She also lived briefly in Kampala, Uganda, and frequently spent time in London, where her father later lived. She attended Loreto Convent Valley Road High School and while there began to play tennis. In 1978, she qualified for the Wimbledon Championships in the Junior girls' singles. Although she lost her match, she was the first Kenyan to play in a Junior Grand Slam tournament. According to Ross McLean, a writer for the International Tennis Federation, she was the only Kenyan to qualify and play in a Junior Grand Slam event at Wimbledon until Angella Okutoyi played in 2022. Many Kenyan newspapers state that she was the first Black African woman to have played in the Junior Wimbledon championships. She competed in the 1978 All-Africa Games in Algiers, Algeria, where she met Tony Githuku, a fellow-Kenyan athlete who competed in swimming and rugby. Wakhungu won the silver medal in the women's singles and along with Jane Davies Doxzon won the gold medal in women's doubles.

Wakhungu attended university at St. Lawrence University in Canton, New York. While she was studying for her degree in economics and psychology, she wrote articles about tennis for the Kenya Times, and played in the college tennis circuit. On winning the women's singles title at the World University Games in Mexico City in 1979, she became Kenya's number one women's player. She graduated in 1982, and that year, she and Githuku began dating. Continuing to play tennis after she graduated, she became the reigning women's champion of the 1983 Robbialac Classic Tournament. She lost the singles title in 1984, but she and her sister Judi went on to win the Robbialac women's doubles. She also won the ladies' singles at the 1984 Kenya Closed Championships. In 1986, she and Githuku married and subsequently had two children. Wakhungu-Githuku took the bronze medal in ladies' doubles with Davies Doxzon at the 1987 All-Africa Games in Nairobi, but after her marriage, she curtailed her tennis activities.

== Career ==
Wakhungu-Githuku began her career as an economist for the government of Kenya with a plan to work in the public and private sectors to gain enough experience to run a successful business of her own. By 1990, she was working as a programme assistant for the United States Agency for International Development. Returning to her studies, she earned a master's degree in research and development planning from the Business School of Strathclyde University in Glasgow, Scotland in 1994, and then worked as a programme manager for the Africa Economic Research Consortium in Nairobi. She completed a decade of working in management in international non-governmental agencies, working at Care International, before shifting to the private sector to work at The Coca-Cola Company. She worked as human resources director for Coca-Cola's Africa division in London before transferring to Johannesburg, South Africa. Working her way up the ladder, she became responsible for learning and development in 90 countries across Africa, Asia, Europe, and the Middle East, and then ended her career in 2009 as the director of Coca-Cola University for Africa and Eurasia.

After leaving Coca-Cola, Wakhungu-Githuku opened a business consultancy, Human Performance Dynamics, in Nairobi, focusing on building human resources. She conceived writing a book, Life Journeys: Seeking Destiny, which would tell the stories of successful contemporary Kenyan women, such as the actress Lupita Nyong'o, the banker Mary Okelo, the educator Eddah Gachukia, the nurse Wairimu Nyoike, and the scientist Norah Olembo, to counter the stereotypical imaging of Africa as poor and starving. In speaking with publishers, Wakhungu-Githuku found that they wanted her to write the stories in a certain way. Rather than agreeing, in 2010 she opened the publishing house Footprints Press and published the book herself. Over the next seven years, she authored and published nine books. The second, Life Journeys: Scaling Heights, focused on successful Kenyan men including her uncle, Moody Awori, and then 50 Years since Independence: Where Is Kenya? brought together fifty-one authors who shared their thoughts on the socio-economic and political development of Kenya since its independence. By 2020, Wakhungu-Githuku had written, compiled, and published over eleven books, including two 2-volume series. One, Nairobi: 5453ft, written with her daughter Natalie, features illustrations by some of Kenya's most noted photographers, including Osborne Macharia, Thandiwe Muriu, and Bobby Pall and the artist Elias Mong'ora, presenting the musings of thirty-five authors about the city. Titled, Mothers and Daughters, the other series includes A Letter to My Daughter from Your Mother and A Letter to My Mother from Your Daughter, both of which explore the complex relationships of mothers and daughters. She has also written Visual Voices (2017), a work about Kenyan artists, and Going the Distance (2020), which focuses on Kenyan runners. In 2021, she was honoured as a Moran of the Order of the Burning Spear by the government of Kenya.

== Selected works ==
- Wakhungu-Githuku, Susan, ed. (2010). Life Journeys: Seeking Destiny – Conversations with High Achieving Women in Kenya. Nairobi, Kenya: Footprints Press. ISBN 978-9966-022-00-4.
- Wakhungu-Githuku, Susan, ed. (2011). Life Journeys: Scaling Heights – Conversations with High Achieving Men in Kenya. Nairobi, Kenya: Footprints Press. ISBN 978-9966-022-01-1.
- Wakhungu-Githuku, Susan, ed. (2012). Life Journeys Nuggets: Musings on Life. Nairobi, Kenya: Footprints Press. ISBN 978-9966-022-06-6.
- Wakhungu-Githuku, Susan, ed. (2013). Aspirations of a Generation. Nairobi, Kenya: Footprints Press. ISBN 978-9966-022-03-5.
- Wakhungu-Githuku, Susan, ed. (2013). 50 Years since Independence: Where Is Kenya? (PDF). Nairobi, Kenya: Footprints Press. ISBN 978-9966-022-11-0.
- Wakhungu-Githuku, Susan, ed. (2014). Wisdom of the Elders: Personal Reflections of over 70 Kenyans Who Have Lived through Changing Times. Nairobi, Kenya: Footprints Press. ISBN 978-9966-022-04-2.
- Wakhungu-Githuku, Susan; Githuku, Natalie, eds. (2017). Nairobi: 5453ft. Vol. 1: Photographic Slices, 2: Personal Musings. Nairobi, Kenya: Footprints Press. ISBN 978-9966-022-17-2.
- Wakhungu-Githuku, Susan, ed. (2017). Visual Voices: The Work of over 50 Contemporary Artists in Kenya. Nairobi, Kenya: Footprints Press. ISBN 978-9966-022-16-5.
- Wakhungu-Githuku, Susan, ed. (2019). Mothers and Daughters. Vol. 1: A Letter to My Daughter from Your Mother, 2: A Letter to My Mother from Your Daughter. Nairobi, Kenya: Footprints Press. ISBN 978-9966-022-25-7.
- Wakhungu-Githuku, Susan, ed. (2020). Going the Distance: The Greatest of Kenya's Relentless Runners, 1958-2019. Nairobi, Kenya: Footprints Press. ISBN 978-9966-022-02-8.
