= Judi Wakhungu =

Kenyan politician

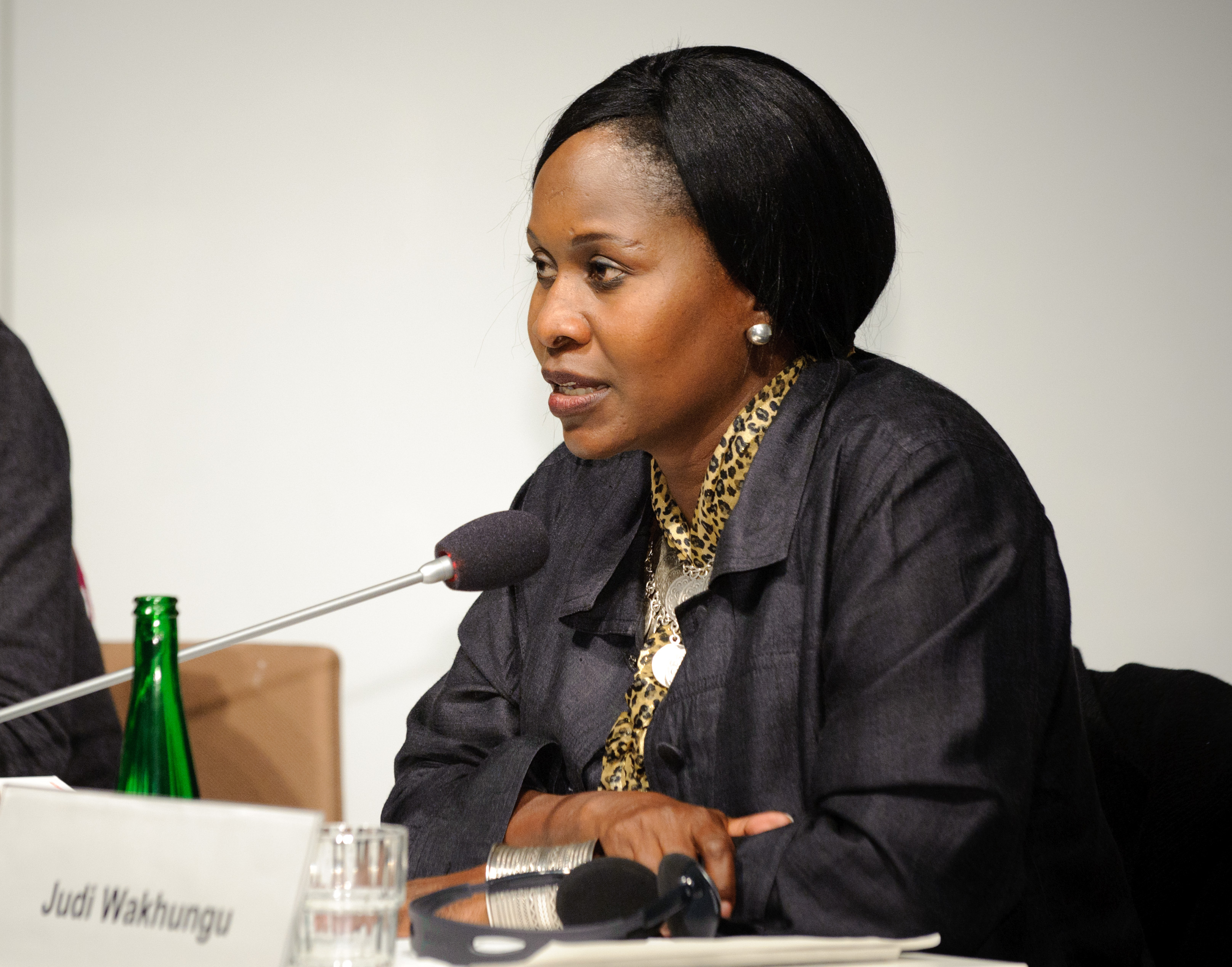

Kenyan Ambassador to France
- In office 27 January 2018 – June 2023
- President: Uhuru Kenyatta

Personal details
- Born: Bungoma, Kenya
- Relations: Susan Wakhungu-Githuku (sister); Moody Awori (uncle); Aggrey Awori (uncle)
- Parent(s): Mathew Wakhungu and Grace Wakhungu
- Education: St. Lawrence University (BSc); Acadia University (MSc); Penn State University (PhD)

Judi Wangalwa Wakhungu EGH is a Kenyan politician, diplomat, and geologist who was appointed by the President of Kenya, Uhuru Kenyatta, as ambassador to France on the 26th of January 2018. Immediately prior to her present position, she served as the cabinet secretary for environment and regional development authorities from 25 April 2013 until 17 January 2018.

== Background and education ==
Professor Judi Wakhungu is the daughter of Grace, a manager at Kenya Reinsurance and Consolidated Bank, and the Late Mathew Wakhungu. Her uncles are former Vice President Moody Awoori and Kenya's first kidney specialist, Professor Nelson Awoori. She was interested in science from an early age, eventually leading her to receive a Bachelor of Science degree in geology from St. Lawrence University in New York in 1983. She also holds a Master of Science degree in petroleum geology from Acadia University in Nova Scotia, Canada, awarded in 1986.

Wakhungu later obtained a Doctor of Philosophy degree in energy resources management from Pennsylvania State University in 1993. Wakhungu credits her alma mater, Pennsylvania State University, for teaching her skills on how to make policies on a scientific basis.

== Career before politics ==
Before her political career, Wakhungu worked as an associate professor of science, technology, and society at Pennsylvania State University, where she also served as the director of the Women in the Sciences and Engineering (WISE) Institute, which was created in partnership with several colleges of various engineering and environmental sciences. Upon returning to Kenya, Wakhungu joined the Ministry of Energy and Regional Development as its first female geologist to study the geothermal energy found in Kenya’s Great Rift Valley. She was also the first female petroleum geologist to serve in the National Oil Corporation of Kenya (NOCK).

Wakhungu was the first woman faculty member at the Department of Geology in the University of Nairobi. She also held an eleven-year tenure as the executive director of the African Center for Technology Studies (ACTS), an intergovernamental organization dedicated to environmental research and sustainable innovation in Africa. She has also served as an advisor to the Energy Sector Management Program of the World Bank and the Legatum Centre at the Massachusetts Institute of Technology.

== Political career ==
In 2013, Wakhungu was selected by then-president Uhuru Kenyatta as Kenya's Cabinet Secretary of Environment, Water, and Natural Resources. She then initiated an exercise to take inventory of Kenya's national ivory and rhino horn stockpiles, in line with the Wildlife Conservation and Management Act of 2013 and the CITES convention, which requires Kenya, among its other state parties, to progress in their management of ivory. The stockpiles were accounted for using digital tools for the first time, including a DNA library, with which forensic evidence helps to prosecute illegal wildlife trade in the region.

In the same year, Wakhungu was also selected by then United Nations Secretary-General Ban Ki-moon to join twenty-six other scientists to form a Scientific Advisory Board. As part of the board, Wakhungu advice United Nations organizations with her expertise on science, technology and innovation for sustainable development. In 2015, she was awarded an Elder of the Golden Heart (E.G.H) by President Kenyatta for her services to the country.

Later in her administration, Wakhungu actively supervised an initiative to collect over twenty-four tones of plastic waste around Lake Nakuru National Park, a protected area known for its wide variety of animals and plants. This eventually led Wakhungu to propose the banning of single-use plastics alongside the National Environment Management Authority (NEMA) and the Kenya Ministry of the Environment. Fines were aimed at plastic-bag manufacturers that refused to comply.

Wakhungu's other proposed and executed acts include the Environment Act of 2015, Forestry Act of 2015, the Climate Change and Water Acts of 2016, and the current Waste Management Bill.

In January 2018, Wakhungu was appointed as ambassador to France, Portugal, Serbia, and the Holy See. The role granted Wakhungu the ability to represent Kenya in international negotiations regarding trade, environmental issues, and security. As part of her work, she later attended Africa Days 2019 where she spoke about Kenya's efforts in sustainable energy production such as geothermal and solar power.

In June 2023, Wakhungu was recalled from her post alongside other prominent Kenyan politicians in France.

== Research ==
Wakhungu's research interests include energy resources management, materials, energy policy and development, science, technology, and development; and gender issues in science and technology policy. She has penned and contributed to multiple research papers over the years, including a 2008 report for ACTS detailing Kenya's rising conflicts over land tenure and post-election violence. Three years later, in 2011, Wakhungu published a conference paper discussing science and technology policy networks in Africa. In the article, Wakhungu proposes that understanding cultural differences between African and global scientific communities is imperative in improving human well-being across the continent.

In 2012, Wakhungu contributed to two articles on agriculture and food insecurity alongside biologist and ex-Government Chief Scientific Adviser for the United Kingdom, John Beddington. She was also one of thirteen specialists who commissioned a report by the Commission on Sustainable Agriculture and Climate Change (CCAFS) titled "Achieving food security in the face of climate change." The report, which cites Wakhungu and Beddington's articles, outlines a series of recommendations for international and national governments seeking to integrate sustainable agriculture, increase investment, improve food access, and reduce food waste.

== Other endeavors ==
Wakhungu has also served on many Kenyan and international boards and committees. She was the research director of the Global Energy Policy and Planning Program of the International Federation of Institutes for Advanced Study (IFIAS), which is based in Toronto, Canada. Wakhungu is also considered a "designated energy expert" for the Gender Working Group of the United Nations Commission of Science and Technology for Development.

Furthermore, Wakhungu has served as the executive director of the African Technology Policy Studies (ATPS) and as the project leader of the Renewable Energy Technology Dissemination Project of the Stockholm Environment Institute (SEI). She is also involved in the board for The International Fund for Animal Welfare (IFAW) as a trustee and director, and is an advocate speaker for the Women in Conservation program within IFAW.

== Awards ==
- Honorary Doctorate of Science from University of Reading in 2017
- Clark R. Bavin Award in 2016
- Ocean Award: The Visionary Award in 2018
- Distinguished Alumni Award from Pennsylvania State University and St. Lawrence University

== See also ==
- Amina Mohamed
- Raychelle Omamo
