= Ministries of Kenya =

Government offices making up the cabinet

This is a list of ministries in the Cabinet of Kenya which help lead the Government of Kenya.

== Ministers ==
There are currently 21 ministries in the Cabinet of Kenya.

List of ministries in the Cabinet of Kenya
	Ministry	Cabinet secretary	State departments	Agencies
	The Presidency		Executive Office of the President; Office of the Deputy President; Cabinet Affairs Office	
1	Office of the Prime Cabinet Secretary (Unconstitutional)	Musalia Mudavadi		
2	Ministry of Interior and National Administration	Kipchumba Murkomen		Kenya Police; Administration Police; Kenya Prisons Service probation and aftercare services
3	The National Treasury And Economic Planning	John Mbadi		Kenya Revenue AuthorityCentral Bank of Kenya
4	Ministry of Foreign and Diaspora Affairs	Musalia Mudavadi		Kenya Foreign Service Institute
5	Ministry of Defence	Soipan Tuya	State Department of Defence	Kenya Defence ForcesThe Kenya Space AgencyNational Defence University of Kenya
6	Ministry of Health	Aden Duale		National Hospital Insurance Fund; Kenya Medical Supplies Authority; Kenya Medical Training College; Kenya Medical Research Institute; Referral Hospitals Authority; Kenyatta National Hospital; Moi Teaching Referral Hospital; Kenyatta University Research and Teaching Hospital; Mathare Mental Hospital; Spinal Injury Hospital; Physiotherapy Council of Kenya; Clinical Officers Council; Kenya Medical Laboratory Technicians and Technologists Board; Nursing Council of Kenya; Kenya Nutritionists and Dieticians Institute; Health Records and Information Managers Board; The National Cancer Institute of Kenya; Radiation Protection Board; Government Chemist; Pharmacy and Poisons Board; National Quality Control; Public Health Officers and Technicians Council; National Aids Control Council; National Authority for the Campaign Against Alcohol and Drug Abuse
7	Ministry of Education	Julius Migos Ogamba	State Department For Basic Education; State Department For Technical, Vocational Education And Training; State Department For Higher Education And Research	Kenya National Examinations Council; Kenya Literature Bureau; Kenya Institute of Special Education; Kenya Institute of Curriculum Development; Institute for Capacity Development for Teachers in Africa; Centre for Mathematics, Science and Technology in Africa; Kenya Education Management Institute; School Equipment Production Unit; Jomo Kenyatta Foundation; National Commission for Nomadic Education; Kenya Institute for the Blind; Technical and Vocational Education and Training Authority; Technical Vocational Education Training Fund Board; Curriculum Development Assessment and Certification Council; Kenya National Qualifications Authority; Commission for University Education; Kenya Universities and Colleges Placement Service; National Commission for Science Technology and Innovation; Higher Education Loans Board; National Research Fund; Universities Funding Board; Kenyatta University; University of Nairobi; Jomo Kenyatta University of Agriculture and Technology
8	Ministry of Roads, Transport And Public Works	Davis Chirchir	State Department Of Roads; State Department For Transport; State Department For Public Works	Kenya Airports Authority Kenya Ports Authority; Kenya Railways Corporation; National Transport and Safety Authority; Kenya National Highways Authority Kenya Rural Roads Authority Kenya Institute of Highways and Building Technology Kenya Institute of Technology Northern Corridor Transit and Transport Coordination LAPSSET Development Authority Kenya Civil Aviation Authority East African School of Aviation Kenya Ferry Services The Nairobi Metropolitan Area Transport Authority
9	Ministry of Devolution and Arid and Semi-Arid Lands (ASALs)		State Department of Devolution; State Department of Arid and Semi-Arid Lands (ASALs)	
10	Ministry Of Lands, Housing And Urban Development	Alice Wahome	State Department For Lands And Physical Planning; State Department For Housing; State Department For Urban Development	National Land Commission
11	Ministry of Environment and Forestry	Deborah Barasa	State Department of Environment and Forestry	National Environment Management Authority
12	Ministry of Mining and Petroleum	Ali Hassan Joho	State Department of mining State Department of Petroleum	
13	Ministry of Agriculture And Livestock Development	Mutahi Kagwe	State Department For Crop Development; State Department For Livestock Development	Agriculture, Livestock, Food and Fisheries Authority (AFFA) Agricultural Finance Corporation Agricultural Development Corporation Kenya Seed Company Strategic Food Reserve Trust Fund Kenya Plant Health Inspectorate Services (KEPHIS) Nyayo Tea Zones Development Corporation South Nyanza Sugar Company Nzoia Sugar Company Chemelil Sugar Company Mumias Sugar Company Agriculture Information Resource Centre Revolving Fund
14	Ministry of East African Community, the ASALs and Regional Development	Hon. Beatrice Askul Moe	State Department for ASALs and Regional Development	The National Drought Management Authority; Kerio Valley Development Authority; Tana River Development Authority; Lake Basin Development Authority; Ewaso Ngiro South Development Authority; Coast Development Authority; Ewaso Ng’iro North Development Authority
15	Ministry of Labour and Social Protection	Alfred Mutua	State Department of Labour; State Department of Social Protection, Pensions and Senior Citizens Affairs	National Social Security Fund
16	Ministry of Tourism and Wildlife	Rebecca Miano	State Department of Tourism; State Department of Culture; State Department of Heritage	State Department for Wildlife
17	Ministry of Water and Sanitation	Eric Muuga	State Department of Water and Sanitation	
18	Ministry of Public Service and Human Capital Development	Geoffrery Ruku	State Department For Public Service; State Department For Gender And Affirmative Action	Kenya School of Government Huduma Centres Institute of Human Resource Management Anti-Female Genital Mutilation Board Gender Violence Protection Centres Women Enterprise Fund Uwezo Fund
19	Ministry of Energy	Opiyo Wandayi	State Department of Energy; State Department of Renewable Energy	
20	Ministry of Trade, Investments And Industry	Lee Kinyanjui	State Department For Industry; State Department of Trade	Kenya Bureau of Standards Kenya Export Promotion and Branding Agency Kenya investment Authority Anti-Counterfeit Authority KIRDI KIPI Micro and Small Enterprises Authority; Kenya National Trading Corporation; Africa Trade Insurance; Trade Remedies Agency; Kenya Trade Network Agency; Private Public Partnership Unit; Industrial Development Bank; Rivatex; East African Portland Cement; Kenya Wine Agencies Limited; Kenya National Accreditation Services; Kenya Investment Authority; Special Economic Zones Authority; Scrap Metal Council; Kenya Industrial Training Institute
21	Ministry of Information Communications And The Digital Economy	William Kabogo Gitau	State Department For Broadcasting And Telecommunications; State Department For Information Communication Technology (Ict) And Digital Economy	Communications Authority of Kenya; Kenya Broadcasting Corporation; National Communications Secretariat; Universal Service Fund Advisory Council; Broadcast Content Advisory Council; Media Council of Kenya; Institute of Mass Communication; Kenya News Agency; The Postal Corporation of Kenya; Government Advertising Agency; Telkom Kenya Limited; Kenya Year Book Editorial; Kenya Film Classification Board; Kenya Film Commission; Konza Technopolis Development Authority; ICT Authority; The East African Marine Cable System Limited; Kenya Advance Institute of Science and Technology (KAIST)
22	Ministry of Youth Affairs, Sports And The Arts	Salim Mvurya	State Department of Sports State Department for Youth Affairs	Sports Kenya Kenya Sports Academy Sports, Arts and Social Development Fund Anti Doping Agency Kenya Film Commission; Affairs and Creative Economy Kenya National Innovation Agency
23	Ministry of Gender, Culture, the Arts and Heritage	Hanna Wendot Cheptumo	The State Department for Culture, the Arts and Heritage	Kenya National Library Service National Heroes Council Kenya National Archives National Museums of Kenya Kenya National Theatre Ushanga Kenya Initiative Kenya Cultural Center Permanent Presidential Music Commission Kenya National Commission For Culture and Social Services The National Lottery Board

== See also ==
- Parliament of Kenya
  - Senate of Kenya
  - National Assembly of Kenya
- Cabinet of Kenya
- Government of Kenya
