= Ministry of Health (Kenya) =

Government ministry of Kenya

- Wizara ya Afya
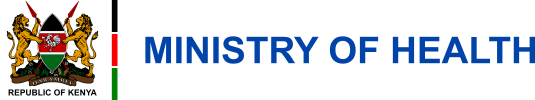

Agency overview
- Preceding agency: Ministry of Health and Housing
- Jurisdiction: Government of the Republic of Kenya
- Headquarters: Afya House, Nairobi
- Annual budget: KSh. 60 billion
- Agency executive: Aden Duale, Cabinet Secretary
- Website: health.go.ke

The Ministry of Health in Kenya is based in Nairobi at the Afya House. The current Cabinet Secretary for health is Aden Duale.

== History ==
The Ministry of Health traces its roots back to colonial times in British Kenya. Post independence, in the inaugural cabinet, the ministry was originally named the Ministry of Health and Housing. The inaugural holder of the post was Dr. Njoroge Mungai.

In 2008, the coalition government was formed and the Ministry of Health was divided into the Ministry of Public Health and the Ministry of Medical Services. However, this lasted for only four years, and the ministries merged into the unified Ministry of Health in 2013 after the formation of the Unity government.

The United States suspended their $21 million funding of the ministry over allegations of corruption on 9 May 2017.

== Child agencies ==
The Ministry of Health has 6 departments within the organization which focuses on their respective sector who are under the supervision of the Director of Medical Services, Principal secretary and Cabinet secretary.

- Department of Preventive and Promotive Health
- Department of Curative and Rehabilitation Health Services
- Department of Standards and Quality Assurance and Regulations
- Department of Planning and Health Financing
- Department of Health Sector Coordination and Inter Government
- Department of Administrative Services

== Historical list of ministers ==
- Bernard Mate (1961–1963)
- Dr. Njoroge Mungai (1963)
- Joseph David Otiende (1965)
- Samuel Ole Tipis (1963-?)

Ministry of Health

- Mwai Kibaki (1988–1991)
- Charity Kaluki Ngilu (2003–2007)

Ministries of Public Health and Medical Services (created in 2008)

- Ministry of Public Health
  - Beth Mugo (2008-2012)
- Ministry of Medical Services
  - Peter Anyang Nyong'o (2008-2012)

Ministry of Health

- James Wainaina Macharia (2013-2015)
- Cleopa Kilonzo Mailu (2015-2017)
- Sicily Kariuki (2018-2020)
- Mutahi Kagwe (2020- 2022)
- Susan Nakhumicha Wafula (2022 - 11 July 2024)
- Deborah Mlongo Barasa (August 2024- March 2025)
- Aden Bare Duale (March 2025-present)

== See also ==
- List of health departments and ministries
