= Mukurwe-ini =

Former district in Nyeri County, Kenya

Coordinates: 0.560943°S 37.048758°E

Mûkûrwe'inî was a former district in Nyeri County, Kenya.

Mûkûrwe'inî was elevated from a division to district status in 2008. The old Mûkûrwe'inî Divisional boundaries remained as the new district's boundaries. Before 1974, Mûkûrwe'inî was referred to as South Tetu Division. It was one of the seven new districts that were created out of the old Nyeri District of Central Province of Kenya. The district headquarters were located at Kiahungu Township which is also the commercial hub for Mûkûrwe'inî.

In 2010, the district was merged with others to form Nyeri County.

== Overview ==
Mûkûrwe'inî District bordered Ndia Constituency (Kirinyaga County) to the south-east, Mathira and Tetu Constituencies to the North, Othaya Constituency to the West and Kiharu and Mathioya Constituencies (Muranga County) to the south. Mûkûrwe'inî had the smallest surface of the seven created districts. Mûkûrwe'inî's main frontiers were delianated by four important rivers: Gikira to the West, Gura to the north, Mugono to the south and - the biggest River - River Tana to the east (a major tributary of Kenya's largest river, the Tana River). Mukurweini was divided into seven administrative locations namely Gakindu, Giathugu, Gikondi, Githi, Muhito, Rutune and Thanu. The four electoral wards of Mukurwe-ini constituency are Mukurwe-ini West, Gikondi, Mukurwe-ini Central and Rugi.

== Kîahûngû Township ==
In addition to being the former administrative centre, Kîahûngû Township, in Mûhîto location, is also the seat for the following: Mûkûrwe'inî Sub-County Hospital, the Kenya Commercial Bank (KCB), the Nyeri Farmers Sacco, the Wakulima Dairy, Royal milk, Wakulima Farmers Sacco, a branch of Equity Bank and the Divisional offices for the Nyeri County Council.

Kîahûngû township was established in 1945 soon after the second world war. Four aspiring businessmen built three small stores, some still standing. One of those was the late Erastus Kang'aru Wachira. He went on to build and boost the township's commercial stature before expanding business to Nyeri town proper. He went on to become a major business figure in the old Nyeri and surrounding Districts under the business name of E. K. Wachira and Sons.

== Electoral constituencies ==
The district's administrative boundaries also constituted the Parliamentary electoral area known as Mukurweini Constituency. The electoral area was initially known as South Tetu constituency but was renamed Mukurwe-ini in 1971, and ratified in 1974 when Othaya Division was hived off and made an electoral area. The current member of parliament is Hon. Anthony Kiai alias High Flyer of the High Flyer Publishers. Hon. Kabando wa Kabando who was also the Assistant Minister for Youth & Sports in the Government of Kenya represented the constituency in Parliament in the years 2007-2013 and 2013-2017. Past Members of Parliament (MPs) for the area include Henry Wariithi Mutahi(1964–69,1974–79, and 1979–83), Morris Mwai Koigi(1969–74), Ngumbu Njururi Maiyani(1983–88 and 1988–92) and David Muhika Mutahi(1992–97 and 1997-2002), a prominent farmer and businessman who is the leading light behind the Wakulima Dairy Farmers Association. The immediate former Member of Parliament is Hon. Mutahi Kagwe (2002–2007).who is also the former Minister for Information and Communications.

== Education & Health ==
The major educational institutions located in the former division are South Tetu Girls', Mweru and Kaheti High Schools, Mukurweini (former Kiangoma, and the oldest secondary school in the District built in 1951), Giathugu, Ngoru, Gikondi, Mihuti, Wamutitu, Tambaya, Gathungururu, Ndia-ini, Rutune, Kibutio, Karindi, Ichamara, St. Ann Githunguri, Kihuti, Thangathi, ACK Kiuu and Kaharo Secondary Schools and the Reverend Muhoro School for the Deaf. Notable health facilities in the former division include the Mukurwe-ini Sub-District Hospital, a fully fledged hospital with ward and surgical facilities, the Gikondi Mission Hospital(Nyagaitwa), Karaba, Mweru, Giathugu, Gakindu, Thangathi, Kiuu, Ichamara and Gumba Health Centres and Mihuti Dispensary.

== Religion ==
Most citizens of Mukurweini are Christians. The main churches are the Presbyterian Church of East Africa (PCEA), the Catholic Church, the African Independent Pentecostal Church of Africa (AIPCA, the Anglican Church, the Full Gospel Church, Gospel Outreach Church, Orthodox Church and the New Apostolic Church. Presbyterians and Catholic missions established footholds in Mukurweini since 1920's. traditional African religions have declined in importance especially among the young. The early Christian churches were instrumental in the advancement of education in the area. As a consequence, the area is home to many prominent personalities in private, business and public life in Kenya.

== Agriculture ==
The people of Mukurweini are mainly farmers and whereas coffee is the main cash crop in the area, most of them practice subsistence farming due to the small size of family holdings. The north-west tip of the District adjacent to Othaya has a few farmers who grow tea. The area is well endowed and has several permanent rivers and numerous springs and streams. The include Rwarai, Gura, Mugono, Thagana, Gikira, Ndurumo, Thiha, Gathera and Ithanji rivers. There is however very little irrigation activity in spite of the dry spells which are now more frequent. The failure to harness these abundant water resources for irrigated farm production is a draw back to District's economic development and food self security. The Division does not experience extreme weather-related disasters beyond occasional droughts. Wajee Nature Park, a bird conservancy, located in Giathugu Location is a good site for all nature and bird watchers. There are a number of falls along Rwarai river. The river valleys in Mukurweini are home to many bird species a number of which are preserved at Wajee Nature Park. The camp has a restaurant and boarding facilities which include pitched tents. The lower parts of the Division particularly Rutune and Thanu Locations have sandy loam soils which are not conducive to subsistence farming. A few people are however involved in the growing of tobacco in the area. There is also an upcoming trade in the clay soil that is being used in Nairobi for manufacture of ceramic products.

With the establishment of the milk production has become the major source of income in the area. The dairy formed as a "Self Help " group but now operates as a limited company with over 6,000 farmers who are its shareholders. The dairy provides banking services from its SACCO.

== Services ==
An incipient services industry is developing gradually due to the demand created by relative distance to larger centres. Rudimenatary IT and electronics services are now available for general consumption. With encouragement, younger citizens are modernizing rural peoples' access to technical, property and project management, consultancies, and related services.

== Roads ==
The major roads in the area are the Karatina – Mukurwe-ini – Gakindu – Othaya Road which is tarred. The road branches 2 km before reaching Gakindu to connect Mukurwe-ini to [Nyeri] Town through Kanunga, Tambaya, Muthinga, Gichira and Kagumo College and finally joining the Nyeri - Karatina - Nairobi highway (A2) at Gatitu . The Mukurwe-ini – Mihuti – Giathugu – Mweru – Kabuta – Kigetui-ini- Gakonya road is the main road that connects most of the divisions to the district headquarters. It is being upgraded and its tarring has less than 10 km left on Murang'a side to complete (though a new contractor(china) is currentry on site), thereby linking with Murang'a - Sagana Road (C71). The construction of the road was officially launched in September 2007 by Kenya President, His Execellency Hon. Mwai Kibaki. The road also connects the division to Muranga and Kirinyaga Districts. The tarring of this road will transform the economic fortunes of the people of Mukurwe-ini and has been a hot political issue in the Constituency for a long time. Other notable earth roads include the Gakindu-Gikondi-Karaba-Kabuta road, Gakindu-Gaikundo-Tambaya road, Kiahungu – Gikondi – Karaba road and the Thangathi – Ichamara - Thiha road.

== The last Itwīka Ceremony happened at Mūtwe-wa-thī in Mūkūrwe-inī ==
In 1891-1892 the last Itwīka ceremony of the Kikuyu people took place at Mūtwe-wa-thī, Thiha Sub-Location, and as it was the tradition it was concluded at the confluence of River Gura and River Thagana (Tana) at Magomano (Machamanīrio) in Mīkūi, Thiha. During this ceremony rika rīa Irūngū kana Maina īrīa nini took charge and consequently the colonial administration, which colonized Kenya from June 1, 1895, forbid the Itwīka ceremony to be held again. After 40 years, in 1932 when the next Itwīka ceremony was bound to happen the colonial government threatened the 7 elders from going on with the ceremony. Not even the independent administration of Jomo Kenyatta returned this noble ceremony.

In 1932, Rika rīa Mwangi Mandūti silently took charge.

In 1972, an elder of the Anjirū clan, Wachira wa Gathiari, from Mahiga in Othaya, was bestowed as the Chief Seer by the War Council leading traditional ceremonies from where Dedan Kimathi Wachiūri(1920-1937) had left. In fact, this was the return of the MAINA age group for a third time in Kikuyuland.

In 2012, Rika rīa MWANGI (MAANKI for Maasai) returned to power.
