= Cabinet of Kenya =

Body of government officials

The Cabinet of the Republic of Kenya is made up of the elected President and Deputy President, together with the appointed Attorney General, and Cabinet Secretaries. Cabinet Secretaries are nominated by the President and approved by Parliament, following vetting procedure. Once approved, they can be reshuffled at the President's discretion.

Article 152 of the Constitution of Kenya sets the procedure for appointment confirmation and dismissal of cabinet secretaries. It provides that there shall be a minimum of 14 and a maximum of 22 cabinet secretaries. A Cabinet Secretary is not a member of the Kenyan Parliament and has to be vetted by a parliamentary committee before their appointment.

== Cabinet of William Ruto (as of April 2025) ==
The President of Kenya William Ruto appointed his first cabinet in September 2022. On 11 July 2024, following sustained pressure on the government through the Kenya Finance Bill protests, Ruto dismissed his entire cabinet, with the exception of Prime Cabinet Secretary and Foreign and Diaspora Affairs Cabinet Secretary (Minister) Musalia Mudavadi. All ministries became vacant pending appointment of new nominees by the Ruto and vetting by parliament.

On 20 July 2024, Ruto nominated the Cabinet Secretaries, six of whom served in the previous cabinet, who were then vetted and approved by Parliament, despite protests from a section of Kenyans on returning 6 Cabinet Secretaries from the previous Cabinet formation.

On 1 November 2024, Kithure Kindiki was sworn in as the 3rd Deputy President of the Republic of Kenya following the impeachment by the National Assembly on 8 October 2024 and Senate on 17 October 2024 of Rigathi Gachagua as Deputy President. Kindiki resigned as Cabinet Secretary for Interior and National Administration to take up the position of Deputy President following the High Court lifting conservatory orders blocking the swearing in.

On 17 January 2025, President William Ruto appointed Former Uhuru Kenyatta Cabinet member Mutahi Kagwe to his cabinet alongside former Nakuru Governor Mr. Lee Kinyanjui and Former Kiambu Governor Mr. William Kabogo Gitau as Cabinet Secretaries of Agriculture and Livestock Development, Investments Trade and Industry, and Information, Communication and Digital Economy respectively. The three were appointed to replace former Deputy President Rigathi Gachagua allies in Ruto's previous cabinet.

On 26 March 2025, President William Ruto fired Public Service Cabinet Secretary Justin Muturi after months of silent battles between Muturi and the President over Muturi's push to have Cabinet discuss the Gen Z protests of June 2024, which the President dismissed. In further changes, he nominated Mbeere North MP Geoffrey Ruku as Muturi's replacement, subject to Parliamentary approval. Cabinet Secretary for Environment, Hon. Aden Duale was moved the Health Ministry while Deborah Barasa replaced Duale at Environment. President Ruto also nominated Hannah Cheptumo as Gender Cabinet Secretary, filling the position left vacant following the July 2024 reshuffle of Cabinet.

Office	Cabinet Secretary
President	William Ruto
Deputy President	Kithure Kindiki
Attorney General of Kenya	Dorcas Oduor
Prime Cabinet Secretary	Musalia Mudavadi
Ministry of Foreign and Diaspora Affairs (Kenya)	Musalia Mudavadi
Ministry of Defence	Soipan Tuya
Ministry of the Interior and National Administration	Kipchumba Murkomen
The National Treasury and Economic Planning	John Mbadi
Ministry of Investments, Trade and Industry	Lee Kinyanjui
Ministry of Cooperatives and MSME Development	Wycliffe Oparanya.
Ministry of Roads and Transport	Davis Chirchir
Ministry of Information, Communication and the Digital Economy	William Kabogo Gitau
Ministry of Energy and Petroleum	James Opiyo Wandayi
Ministry of Health	Aden Duale
Ministry of Education	Julius Migos Ogamba
Ministry of Agriculture and Livestock Development	Mutahi Kagwe
Ministry of Lands, Public Works, Housing and Urban Development	Alice Wahome
Ministry of Environment, Climate Change and Forestry	Deborah Mlongo Barasa
Ministry of Water, Sanitation and Irrigation	Eng. Eric Muriithi Muga
Ministry of Mining, Blue Economy and Maritime Affairs	Hassan Joho
Ministry of Youth Affairs, Creative Economy and Sports	Salim Mvurya
Ministry of Tourism and Wildlife	Rebecca Miano
Ministry of Public Service and Human Capital Development	Geoffrey Kiringa Ruku
Ministry of Labour and Social Protection	Alfred Mutua
Ministry of Gender, Culture, the Arts and Heritage	Hanna Wendot Cheptumo
Ministry of East Africa Community (EAC), ASALs and Regional Development	Beatrice Askul Moe
Secretary to the Cabinet	Mercy Kiiru Wanjau

== See also ==
- List of Ministers of Kenya
- Ministries of Kenya
- Government of Kenya
