= Mutahi Kagwe =

Kenyan politician (born 1958)

Mūtahi Kagwe Honourable, EGH
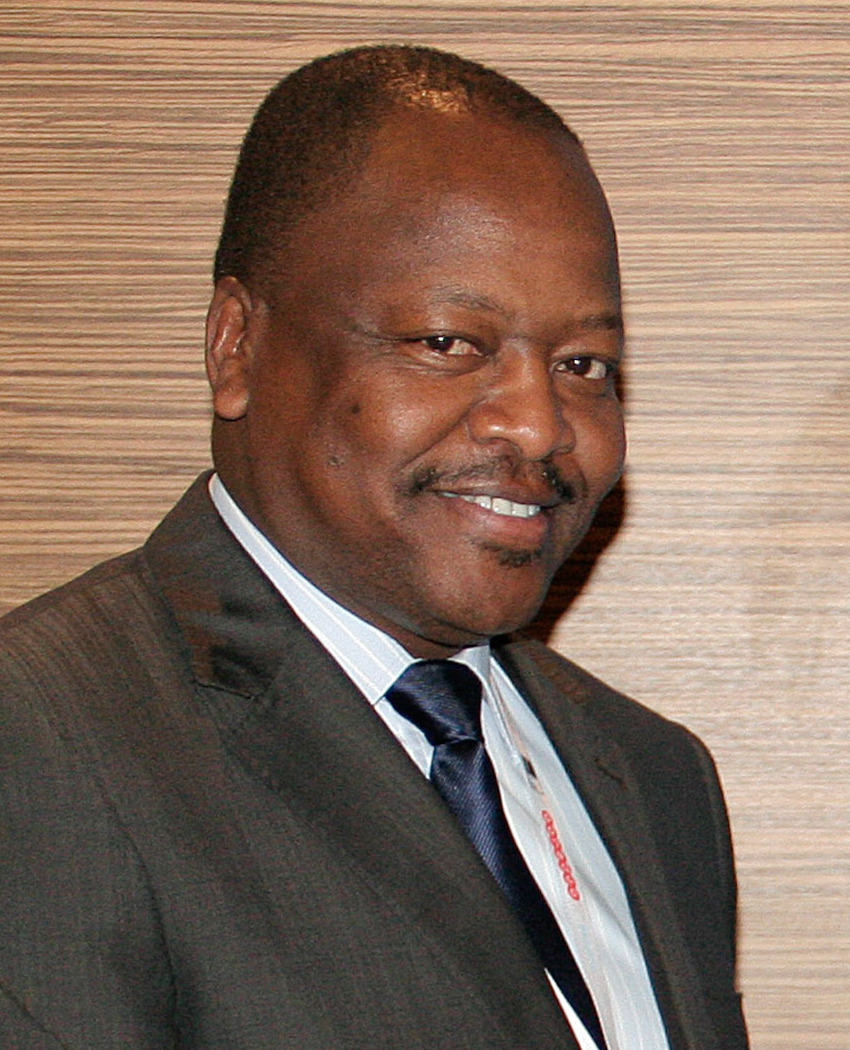
- Mutahi Kagwe in 2013

Cabinet Secretary for Health
- In office 28 February 2020 – 31 October 2022
- President: Uhuru Kenyatta
- Preceded by: Sicily Kariuki
- Succeeded by: Susan Nakhumicha Wafula

Senator for Nyeri County
- In office 28 March 2013 – 7 August 2017
- President: Uhuru Kenyatta
- Succeeded by: Ephraim Mwangi Maina

Minister of Information, Communication and Technology
- In office 2005 – 22 October 2007
- President: Mwai Kibaki
- Preceded by: Raphael Tuju
- Succeeded by: Samuel Poghisio

MP for Mukurweini
- In office 2002–2007
- President: Mwai Kibaki
- Preceded by: David Muhika Mutahi
- Succeeded by: Kabando wa Kabando

Personal details
- Born: January1958}} Nyeri. Kenya.
- Party: Jubilee Party
- Spouse: Anne Wanjiku Mutahi. 1987
- Children: Kagwe Mutahi, Njoroge Mutahi, Nyawira Mutahi. Kahumburu Mutahi
- Education: University of Nairobi; USIU
- Awards: Elder of the Order of the Golden Heart (EGH)

Mūtahi Kagwe is a Kenyan politician serving as the Cabinet Secretary for Agriculture and Livestock Development in the Republic of Kenya. Formerly he was the cabinet secretary for Health in the government of Uhuru Kenyatta. He assumed office on 28 February 2020 after the docket was handed over to him by the previous cabinet secretary for Health, Sicily Kariuki. Kagwe hit the airwaves at the onset of the COVID-19 pandemic when the first case was confirmed in Nairobi on 12 March 2020 following the outbreak in Wuhan, China in December 2019.

== Education ==
Hon. Mūtahi Kagwe was born in 1958 and he attended his early education at Kìhate Primary School from 1965 - 1971. He later joined Kagumo High School in 1972 - 1977 to pursue his O levels and A levels. Kagwe would later join the University of Nairobi from 1978 - 1981 where he graduated with a Bachelor of Commerce (Insurance) degree. He took further studies at the United States International University from 1988 - 1992 and graduated with an MBA.

== Professional career ==
Before Kagwe got into politics he was in private business and had an independent publishing house as well as a public relations company. Between 1987 and 1989 he was working with the Standard Media Group's advertising department where he rose to the position of commercial director of the institution.

== Political career ==
Kagwe's political journey began in the year 2002 when he became the fifth member of parliament for Mukurweini Constituency in Nyeri County on a National Rainbow Coalition (NARC) party ticket. As a member of parliament, he was the chair of the parliamentary committee on Finance, Trade, Tourism, and Planning.

In the year 2005, Kagwe was appointed to the cabinet as the minister of Information, Communication and Technology (ICT) by the late former President Mwai Kibaki.

Kagwe tried to retain his parliamentary seat during the 2007 Kenyan general elections but he lost it to Kabando wa Kabando. He ran in the 2013 Kenyan General Elections for a seat in the Senate of Kenya on a NARC party ticket. He won and became the first senator of Nyeri County.

He assumed office as the senator of Nyeri county in March 2013.

In the 2017 Kenyan general elections, he pursued the Nyeri gubernatorial seat on a Jubilee party ticket, which he lost.
