= Maalim =

Maalim is a family name. It may refer to:

== Given name ==
- Maʽalim ʽAli ʽAden, Somali politician

== Middle name ==
- Hussein Maalim Mohamed, Kenyan politician of Somali origin
- Mohamed Maalim Mohamud, burund politician

== Surname ==
- Farah Maalim Mohamed, Kenyan politician, and an advocate of the High Court of Kenya. Former member of Parliament
- Mahadhi Maalim (born 1972), Tanzanian politician and Member of Parliament
- Mahboub Maalim (born 1958), Kenyan diplomat of Somali origin
