= Nyeri District =

Former district of Kenya

Coordinates: 0°25′S 36°57′E

Nyeri District was a district in the Central Province of Kenya. Its headquarters was in Nyeri town. It had an area of 3,356 km^{2}.

As Nyeri was established in 1901, it served as the headquarters of the Nyeri District as from 1902, and the Kenia Province from 1912. The district was divided into North Nyeri and South Nyeri, with the North being a settler reserve while the south being an African reserve. As of 1933, it was placed within Central Province. The two districts were merged in 1939 and split once more in 1948, with North Nyeri being known as Nanyuki District, and South Nyeri being known as simply Nyeri District. Nyeri District was among the forty districts of 1963.

The district was located on the southwest flank of Mount Kenya. Local people are predominantly of the Kikuyu tribe.

By 2005, the district had been divided into Nyeri North and Nyeri South all with total population of 693,558 in the 2009 census.

In 2010, after the promulgation of the new constitution of Kenya, counties were to be created based on the districts of Kenya as at 1992. This effectively led to the creation of Nyeri County.

== Administrative divisions ==
The district was divided into seven divisions: Kieni East, Kieni West, Mathira, Mukurwe-ini, Nyeri, Othaya and Tetu.

== Constituencies ==
The district had six constituencies:

- Tetu Constituency
- Kieni Constituency
- Mathira Constituency
- Othaya Constituency
- Mukurweini Constituency
- Nyeri Town Constituency
