= Garissa Township Constituency =

Kenyan electoral constituency

Garissa Township Constituency (formerly Garissa Central/Dujis Constituency) is an electoral constituency in Kenya. It is one of six constituencies in Garissa County. The constituency is further subdivided into four Electoral Wards; namely, Waberi, Galbet, Township and Iftin.

== Members of Parliament ==
Elections	MP	Party	Notes
1969-1983	Abdi Aress Mohammed	KANU	One-party system
1978	Abdikadir Yussuf Hassan	KANU	One-party system
1988	Hussein Maalim Mohamed	KANU	One-party system
1992	Hussein Maalim Mohamed	KANU	1st Multi party elections
1997	Hussein Maalim Mohamed	KANU	
2002	Hussein Maalim Mohamed	KANU	
2007	Aden Bare Duale	ODM	
2013	Aden Bare Duale	URP	
2017	Aden Bare Duale	JP	
2022	Aden Bare Duale	UDA	
2023	Dekow Barrow Mohamed	UDA	

== Electoral wards ==
Ward	Ward Population	Area(km^{2})	County Representative	Party
Waberi	9,617	1	Yussuf Dadle Dagane	ODM
Galbet	18,244	1000	Ibrahim Abdi Ali	ODM
Township	12,349	2	Abdifatah Kassim Hussein	ODM
Iftin	10,743	4	Issack Mohamed Shurie	TNA
