= Kenya Forest Service =

Agency of the Government of Kenya

Agency overview
- Formed: 2005
- Preceding agency: Kenya Forest Department
- Dissolved: 2005
- Jurisdiction: Government of Kenya
- Headquarters: Karura , Nairobi
- Minister responsible: Dr. Deborah Mlongo Barasa
- Website: https://www.kenyaforestservice.org/

The Kenya Forest Service is an agency of the Government of Kenya designated by the Forest Act of 2005 as the replacement for the old Forest Department. It is overseen by the Board of the Kenya Forest Service. The former Forest Department was supported almost entirely from forest revenues, and was, as a result, chronically underfunded. Under the 2005 Forest Act this has changed somewhat, for example, with the creation of special funds such as the Water Towers Conservation Fund, a portion of which goes to forest rehabilitation, and the Mau Rehabilitation Trust Fund, for the Mau Forest. As of 2003, Kenya had 1.57 million hectares of gazetted forest.

== Content ==
1. Background
2. History 2.1 Pre-Colonial Era 2.2 Colonial Era (1895-1963) 2.3 Post-Independence; The Forest Department (1963-2007) 2.4 Establishment of Kenya Forest Service (2005–2007) 2.5 Legislative Reform: The FCMA 2016
3. Mandate and Functions
4. Structure and Governance
5. Key Forests Under Management
6. Conservation Programmes
7. Challenges
8. See Also
9. References

== Background ==
Kenya is not a country of extensive natural forest cover. At the time of independence in 1963, forests covered approximately 2.7 per cent of Kenya's total land area. As of 2003, Kenya had approximately 1.57 million hectares of gazetted forest. Despite this relatively limited coverage, forests are critical to the country's water catchment systems, biodiversity, climate regulation, and livelihoods of forest-adjacent communities. The management of these resources has evolved significantly over more than a century, from indigenous community stewardship through colonial administration to the modern regulatory body that KFS represents today.

== History ==
=== Pre-Colonial Era ===
Prior to colonization, Kenya's forests were managed by indigenous communities through customary institutions that regulated access to forest resources. These community based systems maintained sustainable use of forest land, with many communities including the Mijikenda, holding forests in high cultural and spiritual regard, such as the sacred kaya forest of the coast.

== Mandate and Functions ==
The outlined functions of the Kenya Forest Service include; #Conserve, Protect and Manage all Public Forests, #Prepare and Implement Management plans for all public forests and #Receiving and consideration of Permits and licences in relation to Forest resources as stated in the ACT.

== Structure and Governance ==
The Management Structure of the Kenya Forest service is divided into two Categories. The first category is The Board of Directors and the other category is Senior Management.

The Board of Directors is led by the Chairman Mr. Titus Kipkoech Korir. The other members of the board include Representatives from different government bodies and parastatals such as The National Police Service, National Treasury, State Department of Forestry among others.

== Mission ==
Among the responsibilities of the Kenya Forest Service are to:

- Own, manage and protect all state forests
- Promote forestry education and training and operate the Kenya Forestry College
- Enforce the conditions and regulations pertaining to logging, charcoal making and other forest utilisation activities
- Apprehend and prosecute violators of forest law and regulations
- Collect revenues from exploitation of forest products

== Forest management plans ==
The Kenya Forest Service has begun issuing management plans for individual forests. Plans are in effect for:

- Arabuko-Sokoke Forest
- Cherangani Hills Forest consisting of thirteen blocks including the Embobut Forest
- Karura Forest
- Kereita Forest
- Mau Forest
- Saboti-Sosio Forest, a Green Zones Development Support Project supported plan
- South Nandi Forest, a Green Zones Development Support Project and Nature Kenya supported plan
- Vanga, Jimbo and Kiwegu Mangrove Forest, an Air Kenya supported plan
