= Oloolua Forest =

Urban forest in Nairobi, Kenya

Coordinates: 1°21′43″S 36°41′56″E

Oloolua Forest is an urban forest in the Karen area of Nairobi, Kenya. The forest, immediately adjacent to the Karen Blixen Farm, was gazetted in 1932 and is managed by the Kenya Forest Service.

The forest is 618 hectares consisting of eight blocks separated by the Standard Gauge Railway and several road projects cutting through it.

While less used by the public than the better-known Karura Forest, Oloolua is an increasingly popular walking and jogging destination in the Karen area of Nairobi.

== History ==
During the colonial era, Oloolua Forest was one of many bases for the operations of the Mau Mau freedom movement.

== Environmental concerns ==
Increasingly, concerns have been raised by nearby residents over land grabbing, encroachement, and destruction of the forest by private developers, with Kenya Forest Service standing accused of failing to protect the forest.
