= Esther Murugi Mathenge =

Kenyan politician

Esther Mūrugi Mathenge is a Kenyan politician. She is a former Member of Parliament for Nyeri Town Constituency in the National Assembly of Kenya.

== Political career ==
Mūrugi was a Minister of Special Programs under the Kibaki-Raila Coalition government. She first tried her shot in politics in 2002 Kenyan elections where she lost the National Alliance Rainbow Coalition (NARC) ticket to Peter Gichohi Muriithi. Then, she was elected under the Party of National Unity in the 2007 Kenyan parliamentary election. Murugi then retained the seat in the 2013 elections under The National Alliance (TNA) party in the Uhuru and Ruto Jubilee era, becoming the first person to ever retain the Nyeri Town parliamentary seat in history. Mūrugi then lost the seat in the 2017 elections to Ngunjiri Wambugu. She's remembered as the second woman to win an election in the larger Nyeri County after Professor Wangari Maathai won the Tetu constituency parliamentary seat in 2002.
