= Kenyatta High School (Mahiga) =

High school in Kenya

Kenyatta High School (Mahiga) is located in Nyeri County, Kenya.

== History ==
The school was started before Kenya attained independence in 1963. It was started by the community, to offer education to students of parents segregated and denied education by the colonists. The school was first known as Kagere High School, then Mahiga High School and later named Kenyatta High School (Mahiga) in 1965. When the state of emergency was declared in 1952, the school was banned and deregistered on the grounds that its founders were sympathetic or followers of the Mau Mau movement, a group of nationalist Kenyans fighting the British occupation of Kenya.

The school opened again on 1966 and was officially opened on 30 March 1969 by Mbiu Koinange, Minister of State, named Kenyatta High School (Mahiga), after the first President of the Republic of Kenya. The school is sponsored by the African Independent Pentecostal Church of Africa - AIPCA.

Assistance from the Peace Corps and charitable non-governmental organizations such as Voluntary Service Overseas made it possible for the school to continue running and admitting students. Some of the people who helped the school during the formative stages included Mr. Dunstan Kiboi Wariua and Mr. Nguya Kaguora, whilst some teachers were VSO and Peace Corps volunteers, such as Mr. Mansel Richards (1968–1970), Mr. Al Giles (1969–1971) Eluned Barton (1970-1971 and Mr. Hugh Allen (1970-1973)

== Curriculum ==
The school teaches most of the subjects offered by secondary school education. One of the subjects taught is French and the school is ranked number 18 in the country
