= Karura Forest =

Urban forest in Nairobi, Kenya

Coordinates: 1°14′25″S 36°49′25″E

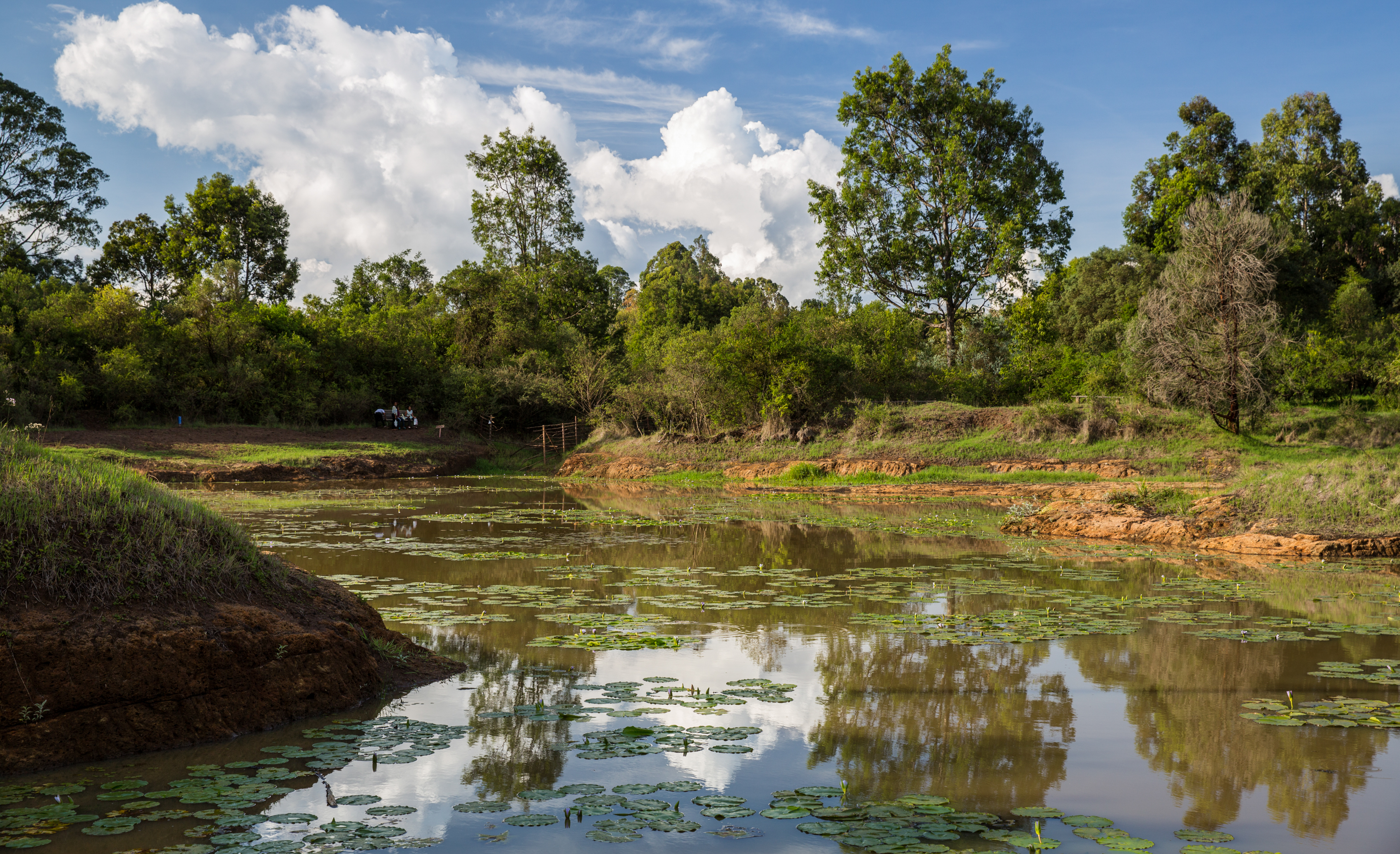
Karura Forest

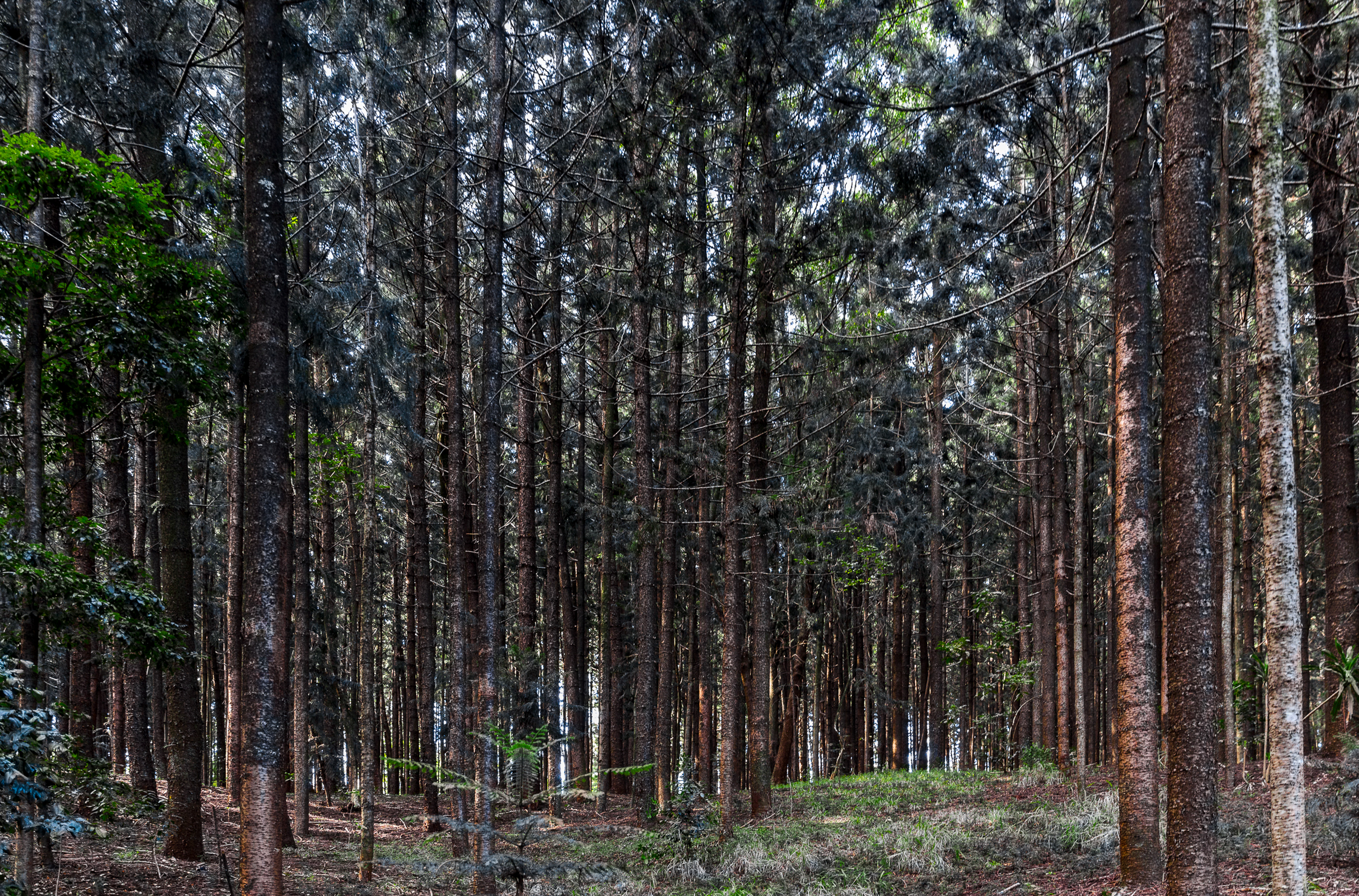
Karura Forest

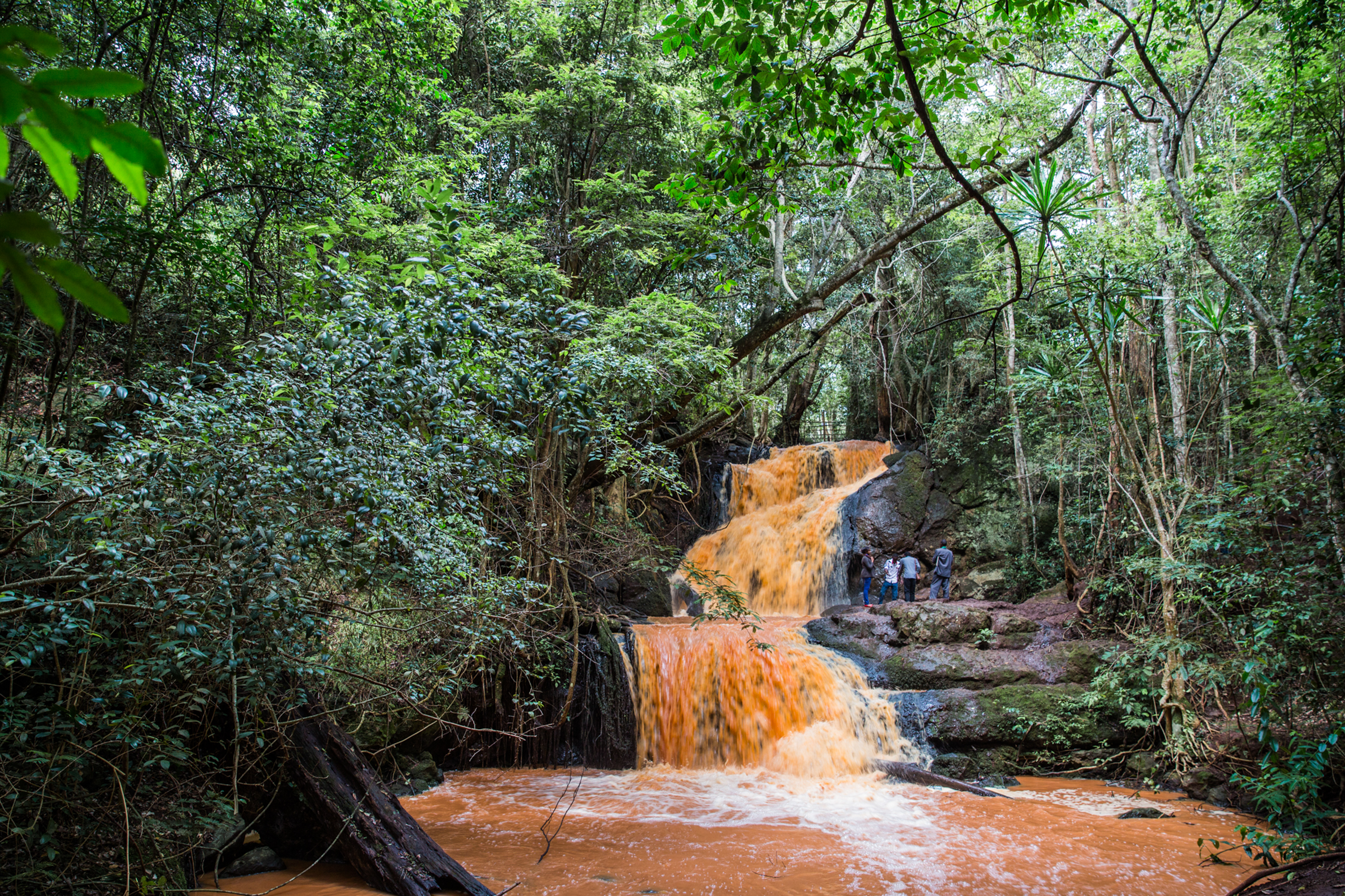
Karura Forest, Waterfall. The water is orange during the rainy season

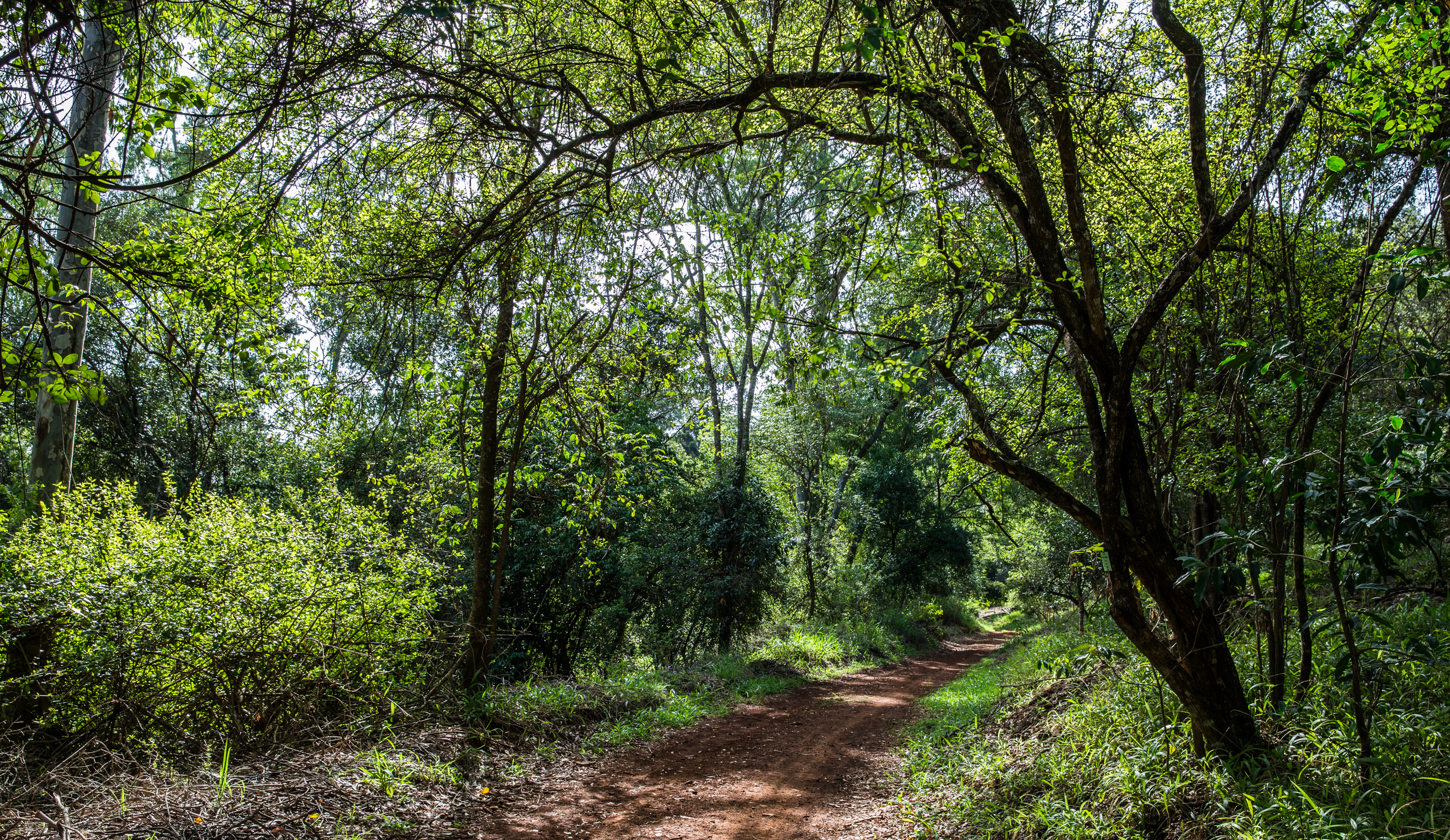
Karura Forest

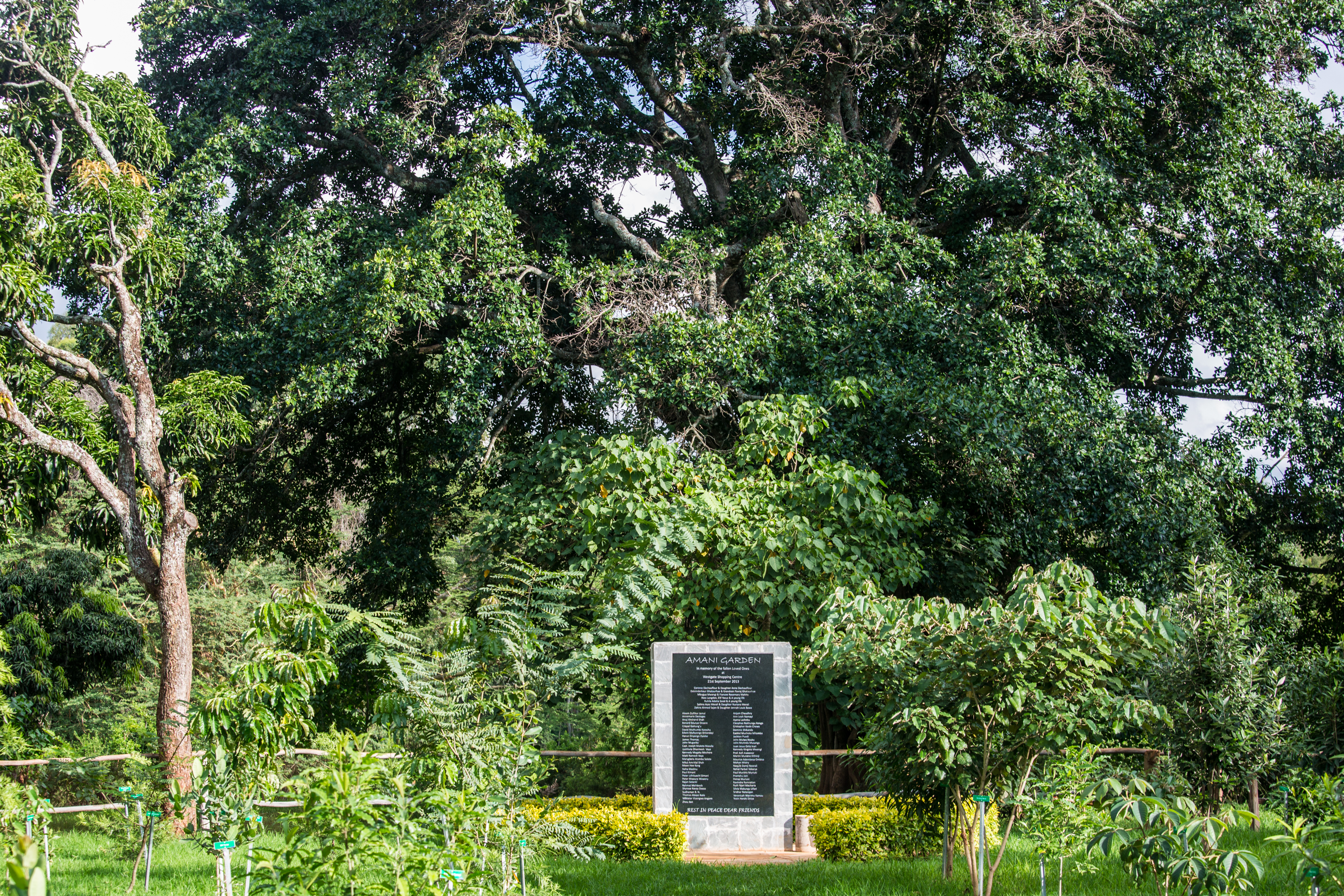
Amani Garden, Karura Forest, in memory of the victims at Westgate Shopping Centre 21 September 2013

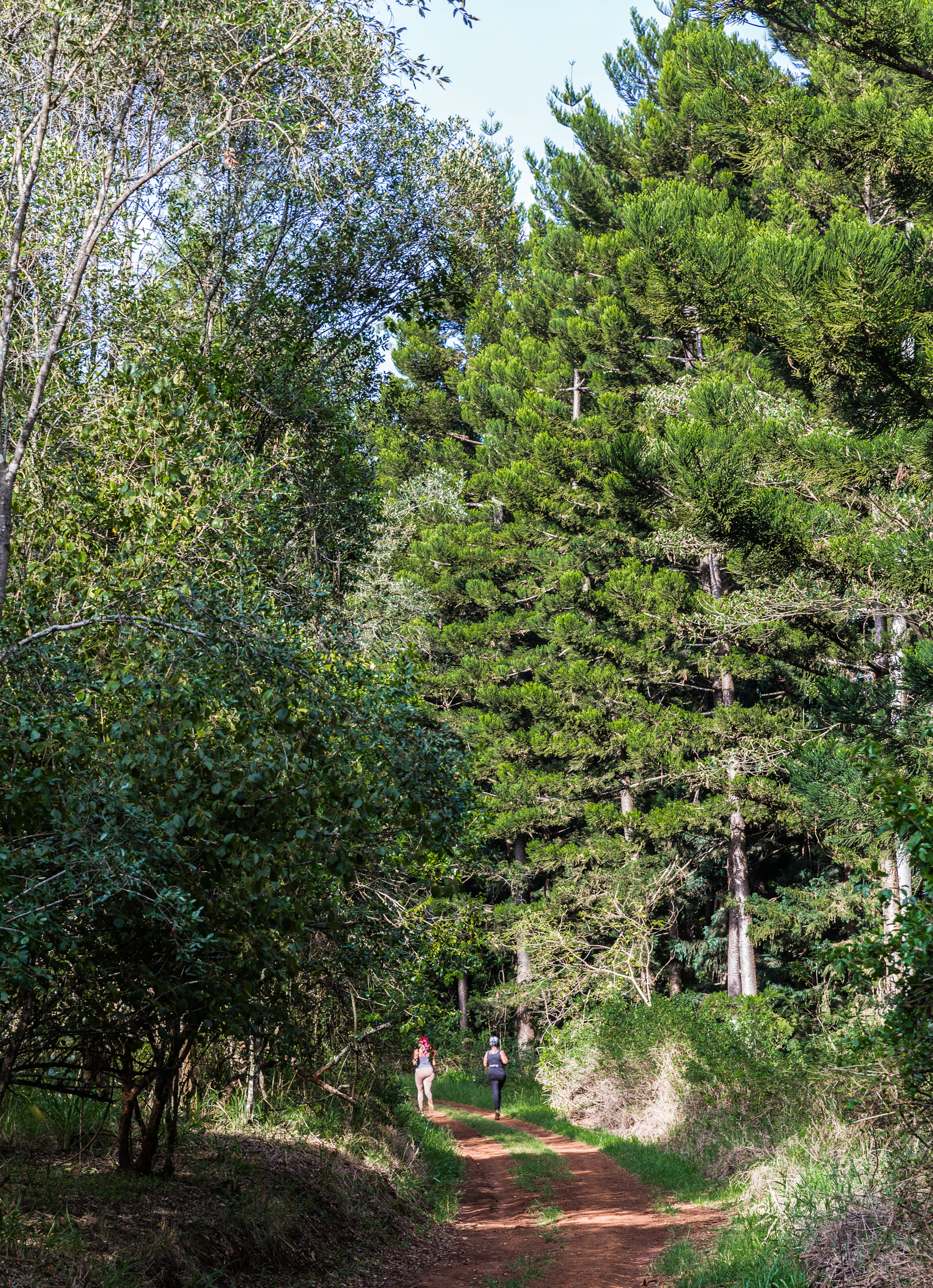
Karura Forest

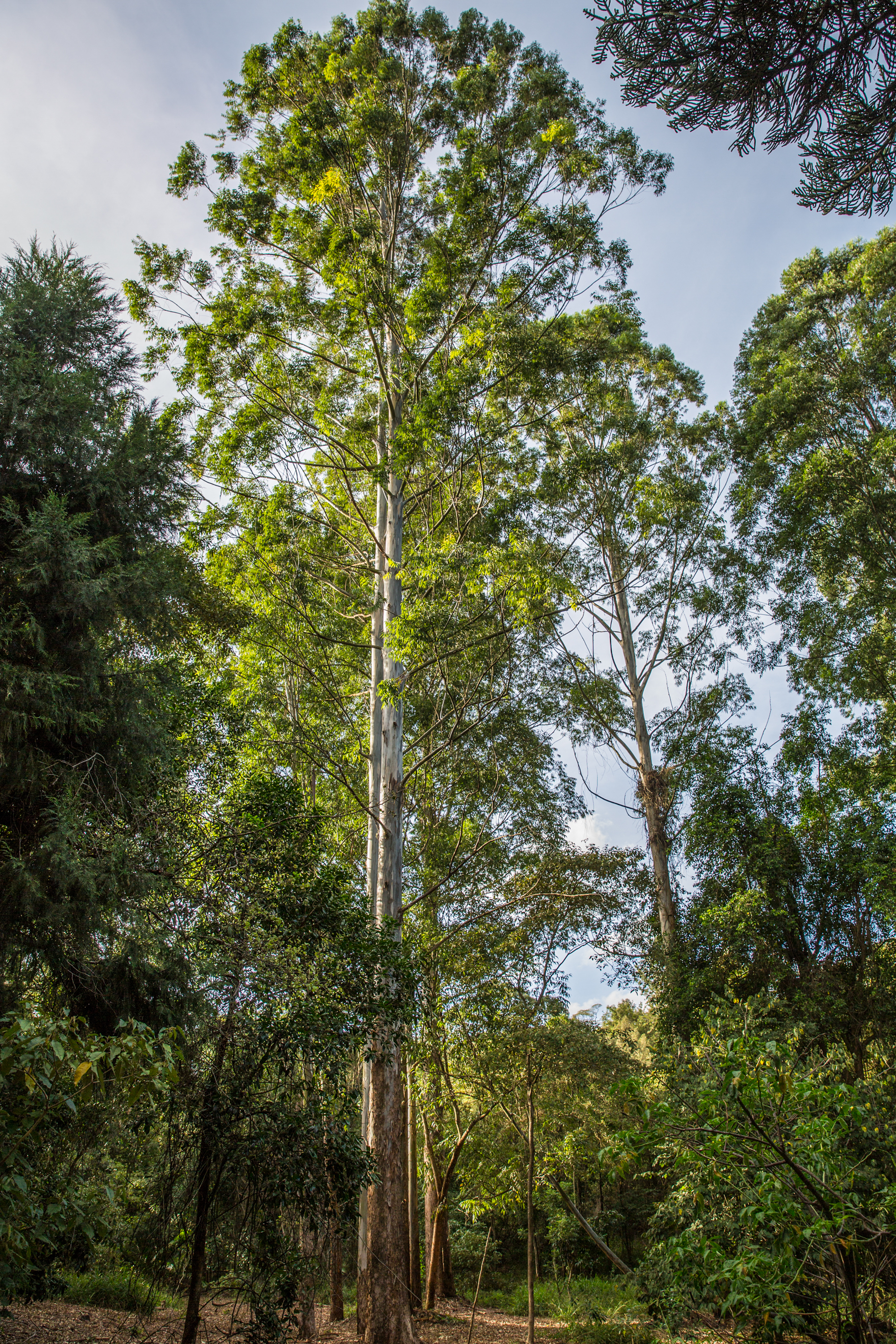
Karura Forest

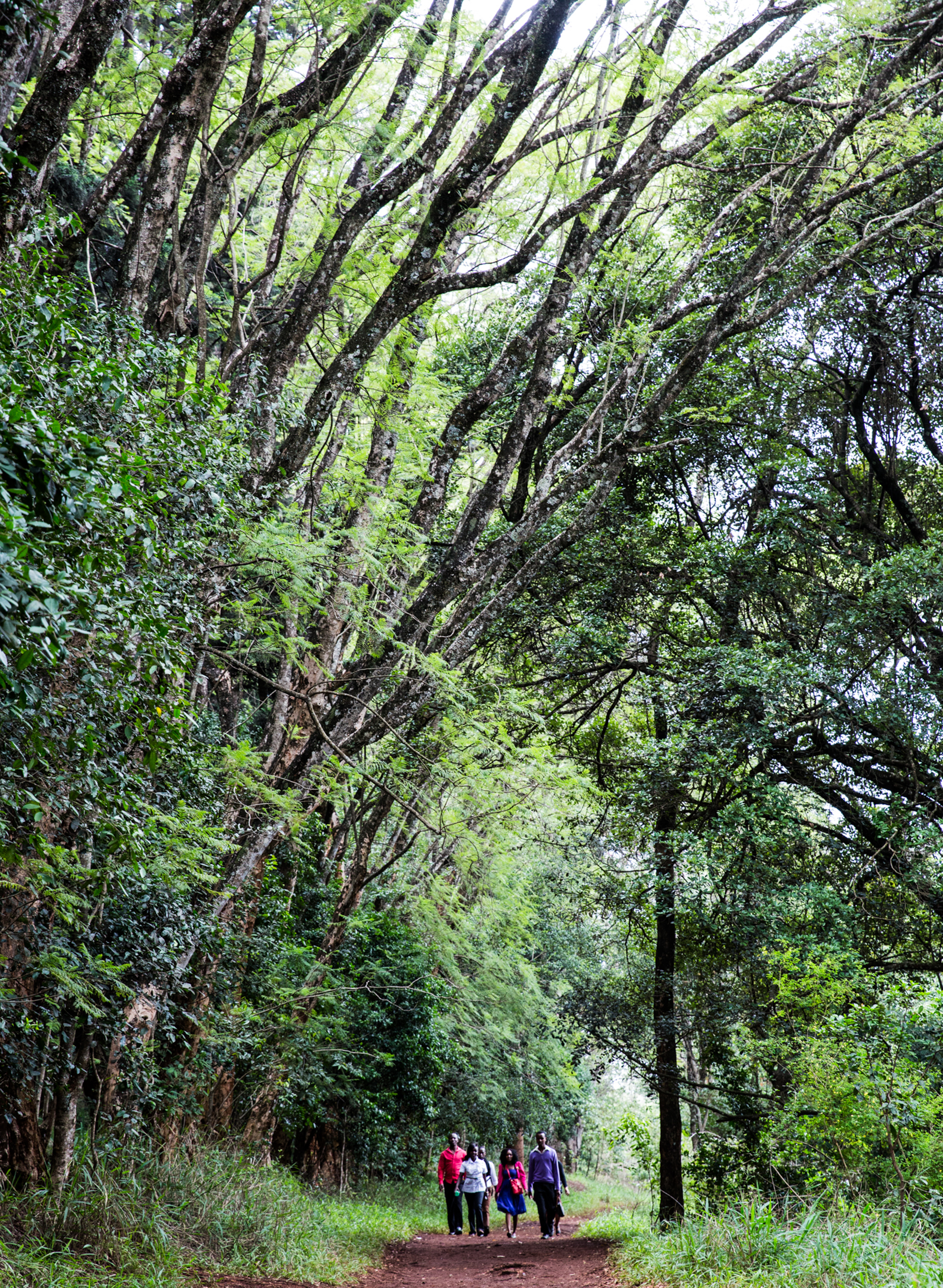
Karura Forest

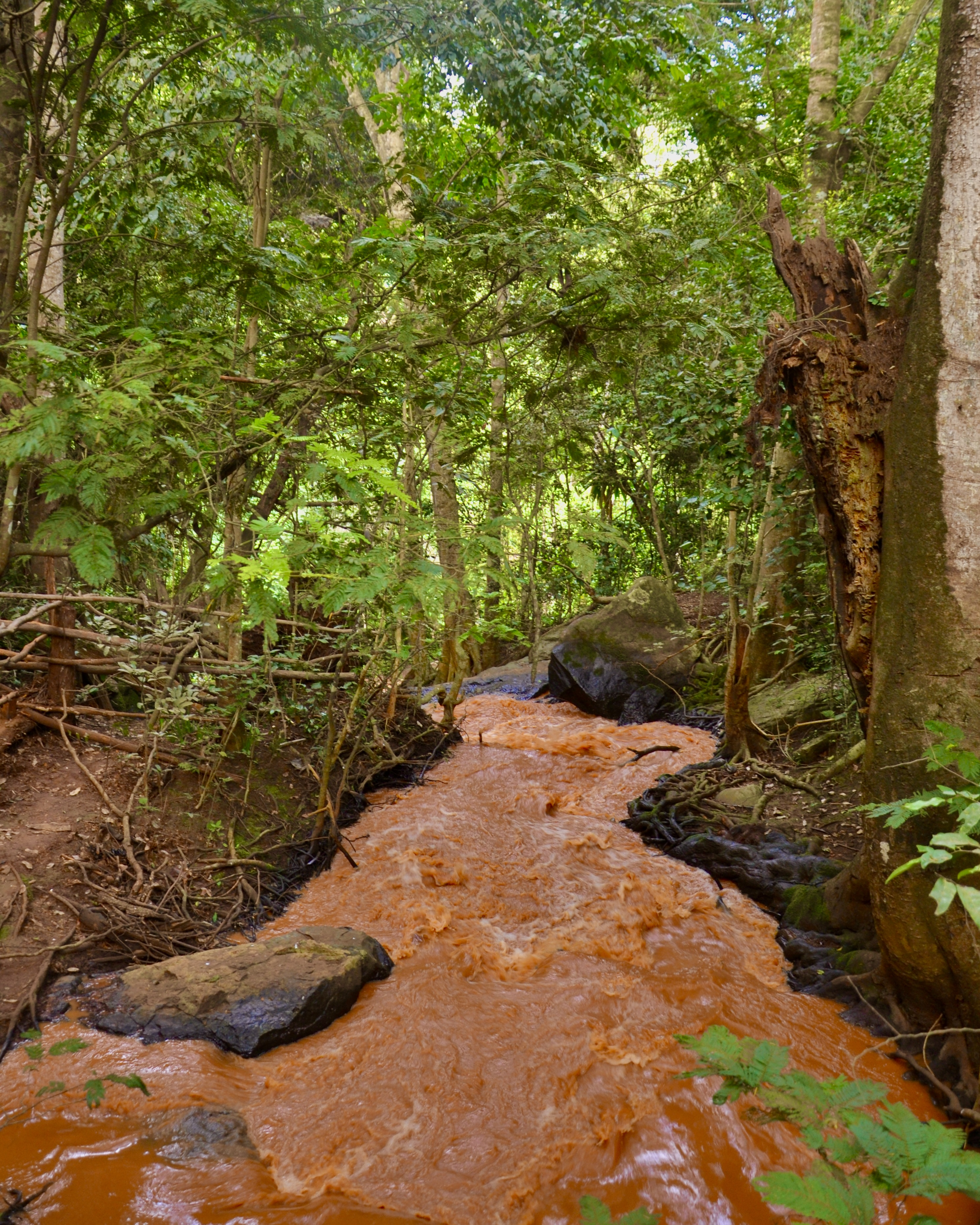
Karura forest and stream of water

Karura Forest is an urban forest in Nairobi, the capital of Kenya. It is the second largest urban forest in the world after the Tijuca Forest in Rio de Janeiro located in Brazil. The forest was gazetted in 1932 and is managed by the Kenya Forest Service in conjunction with the Friends of Karura Forest Community Forest Association.

Karura Forest is 1,041 hectares (2,570 acres) consisting of three parts separated by Limuru and Kiambu roads. The large middle portion is ca. 710 hectares (1,800 acres); the Sigiria salient to the west is ca. 250 hectares (620 acres). The portion to the east of Kiambu road has been allocated to special national priorities. As of mid-2016, 36% of the forest contains indigenous upland forest tree species. The forest is home to some 200 species of bird as well as suni, Harveys Duiker, bushbucks, bush pigs, genets, civets, honey badgers, bush babies, porcupines, Syke's monkeys, bush squirrels, hares, fruit bats, and various reptiles and butterflies. Karura now has over 50 km of trails for visitors to walk, run or bike.

Due to its proximity to a growing city, there have been plans to reduce the forest in favour of housing and other development. However, these plans have been controversial with conservationists. In the late 1990s there were housing projects that would have excised portions of the forest. Conservationists, led by Wangari Maathai, the leader of Green Belt Movement who later became a Nobel Peace Prize Laureate, carried out a much publicised campaign for saving the forest. Karura Forest became also a symbol against controversial land grabbings in Kenya.

== Geography ==
Karura Forest has an area of 1 063.0 ha, making it largest of three main gazetted forests in Nairobi. The others are Ngong Forest and Oloolua Forest. The centrally located Nairobi Arboretum is much smaller.

Karura Forest is located north of central Nairobi and is bordered by the suburbs of Muthaiga, Gigiri, Runda, Ridgeways, Mathare North, Peponi and New Muthaiga. The western part of the forest is also known as Sigiria Forest.

The area north of central Nairobi forms a drainage basin and was once heavily forested, but exists today only as patches like Karura Forest and City Park. The forest is cut by Thigirie, Getathuru, Rui Ruaka and Karura Rivers, all tributaries of Nairobi River.

There are a waterfall, bamboo forest, marshland, Mau Mau caves and an old church in the forest.

The United Nations Office at Nairobi and UNEP headquarters are located adjacent to the forest. The Karura Forest Product Research Centre is also located there.

== Ecology ==
Wildlife in the forest include monkey species (including recently re-introduced Colobus Monkeys), bush baby, bushbuck, bush pig, porcupine, duiker, genet, dik dik, African civet and East African epauletted fruit bat.

Plant species typical to the forest include Olea europaea (var. africana), Croton megalocarpus, Warburgia ugandensis, Brachyleana huillensis and the Uvaridendron anisatum.

== Development projects and environmental issues ==
Parts of the forest were degazetted by Minister of Environment Jeremiah Nyagah in 1989. Between 1994 and 1998 a total of 564.14 hectares of the forest were secretly allocated to 64 different companies for housing projects. Around 1995 there were plans to build a housing estate in the forest, but opposition by local residents led to temporary shelving of the plans.

The projects revitalised again in September 1998, when the Forest Department was issued a quit notice by private developers. The clearing of the forest started igniting fierce protests by environmentalists and others concerned. On 7 October 1998 the construction site was invaded by demonstrators, including 12 opposition MP's. The protest turned violent and bulldozers and other machinery used to clear the forest was destroyed worth more than 80 million Ksh ($2 US million).

Minister for Lands and Settlements Noah Katana Ngala released a list of companies who had been allocated land in Karura Forest in November 1998. However, the records of those companies were not found at Registrar General's office, making it difficult to trace the individuals behind these companies.

On 8 January 1999 when a group of women led by Wangari Maathai were holding a demonstration by planting trees near the forest, a large group of security guards attacked them. Several of them were injured, including Maathai who was taken to Nairobi Hospital. The police were reluctant to investigate the incident. However, the Attorney-General Amos Wako apologised to Maathai and promised an inquiry on the incident.

The Time Magazine, in support of Maathai, named her a Hero of the Week in 1998. Klaus Töpfer, the executive director of UNEP, warned that the organisation may move its headquarters out of Kenya if the forest faces destruction. The UN Secretary General Kofi Annan also condemned the attack on Maathai. Architectural Association of Kenya asked in November 1998 Kenyan architects not to be involved with any design that would threaten the forest

Kenyan President Daniel arap Moi criticised the protesters and asked the Church not to involve itself with the saga. Minister for Natural Resources Francis Lotodo defended the projects in January 1999 stating that Nairobi as a growing city needed space for development. Professor R. A. Obudho of University of Nairobi, who specialises in urbanisation, also supported the projects

University of Nairobi students held several demonstrations for preservation the forest. On 20 January 1999 several students were injured when they clashed with police. The University of Nairobi was closed temporarily following the protests, and all students were ordered to leave the campus. Opposition MP's James Orengo (Ford-Kenya), David Mwenje (DP) and Njehu Gatabaki (SDP) were charged in court for attending student protests.

Eventually housing plans were taken down in lack of public support, but land allocations still stood in place.

In 2003 the NARC government led by Mwai Kibaki replaced the long-standing Moi-led KANU-government. In 2003 the Minister of Environment Newton Kulundu denied the American investor Raymond Chisholm a permit to construct a hotel in the forest. Learning that the new government would revoke dubious KANU-era land allocations, developers started to relinquish their properties in the forest

The new Kenya Forests Act in 2005 made it more difficult to degazette forests in Kenya, thus protecting Karura Forest as well

There was a project by Kenya Forest Service, UNEP and Red Cross Kenya in 2008 to cut down eucalyptus and blue gum trees in parts of the forest and plant indigenous species in their place. Green Belt Movement was doubtful with the project, fearing that logging of the forest could actually lead to private developers invading the forest

In 2009 it was reported that part of the forest had been allocated to the National Environmental Management Authority (NEMA). This plan was also opposed by Wangari Maathai and the Green Belt Movement, who stated that the NEMA should be protecting, not destructing the forest.

The Nairobi Northern Bypass road, constructed in 2009, passes through a wetland that contributes to one of the five Karura Forest water courses, thus posing a threat to the forest.

Karura Forest had a reputation as dangerous spot. Muggings, robbery and violence were common. At one point, said Kenya Forest Service (KFS) Head of the Nairobi Conservancy, Charity Munyasia, they were discovering one dead body there per fortnight, on average. With efforts that began in 2009 to fence the forest and restore safety, Karura has become a popular walking, cycling, and jogging destination for Nairobi residents, and increasingly also for tourists.

The new Kenya Forests Act (2005) also provided for the establishment of Community Forest Associations (CFA). In 2009 an initiative was thus formed under the name 'Friends of Karura Forest Community Forest Association'. Recognising the growing threats to Karura from uncontrolled development the neighbouring Muthaiga and Gigiri Residents Associations begin discussions in early 2009 to form a Community Forest Association for Karura. A letter of intent circulated to northern Nairobi neighbourhoods residents, heads of agencies and VIPs under joint signature of KFS and the Muthaiga Residents' Association (MRA). A stakeholders' Working Committee was formed to steer the process, and, in order to raise awareness, it organised a media event in the form of the opening of Karura's 'Family Trail' on 16 May 2009 with the Hon. Noah Wekesa, Minister for Forestry and Wildlife, presiding. Hundreds of stakeholders participated in walking the length of the trail. On 25 May 2009 KFS wrote a letter to the Registrar of Societies expressing No Objection to the registration of the new CFA. Between April and July 2009 FKF-CFA office-bearers completed the required vetting processes with the Criminal Investigation Division and Registrar of Societies. The FKF-KFS joint management plans were drafted by the Working Committee. On 1 October 2009 the Registrar of Societies signed the Certificate of Registration for the Friends of Karura Community Forest Association. At the First FKF Annual General Meeting on 21 April 2010 Alice Macaire became FKF's first elected chairperson.

The nascent and unique parastatal-stakeholder partnership took its first major management decision on 25 Feb 2010 when FKS and FKF signed an MOU concerning installation and operation of an electric fence to fully secure the forest perimeter. FKF raised the necessary funds and the fence was completed in September. In December 2010 the Strategic Management Plan signed by KFS Director D.K, Mbugua, and on 26–27 February 2011 there was a Grand Opening Ceremony in the forest to celebrate a Karura that was now 'Secure, Safe & Serene' and open for visitors.

At the second FKF Annual General Meeting on 19 April 2011. Prof. Karanja Njoroge, who had served as Wangari Maathai's deputy at the GreenBelt Movement, was elected to chairmanship of FKF. Wangari Maathai and Alice Macaire were anointed as honorary Patrons of the Community Forest Association. Cristina Boelcke-Croze continued as vice-chair along with Judge Sharad Rao.

Thus, in only five years, the FKF Community Forest Association in partnership with the Kenya Forest Service and Kenyan corporate and private donors, fenced, secured and transformed Karura "from the dumping site for hijackers and murderers and illegal private developers" into a popular local recreation and conservation site. From literally zero visitors in 2009, the forest is now welcoming an average of 16,000 visitors a month, 70% of whom are Kenyan citizens. In 2015 there were some 600,000 visitors.

A documentary about the transformation of the forest, " Rejuvenating The Karura Forest: Danger Spots to Green Haven," was produced by Duncan Ndotono and directed by Brenda Okoth, recognised efforts being made to nurture Karura Forest back to life The Friends of Karura Forest Community Forest Association can be contacted at rafiki@karurafriends.org.

== Tourism ==
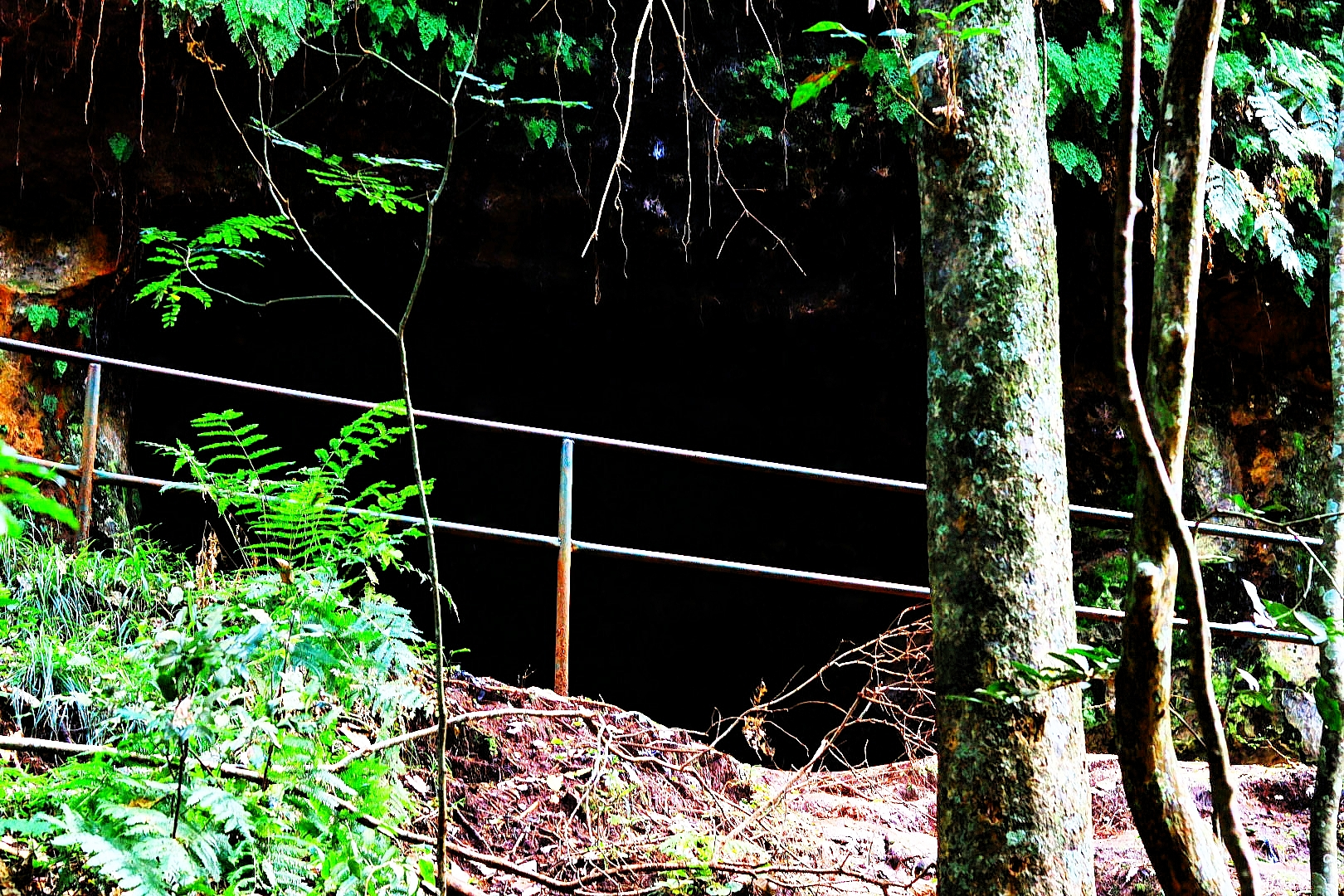
Tke Karura Caves

Karura Forest is now developed as a visitor's attraction for both local and international, with more than 16,000 entries per month. This includes creation of some 50 km of nature trails for walking, running and biking. The first trail, which is four kilometres long and connects Limuru Road with Old Kiambu Road was opened in May 2009. An electric fence has been built around the forest for security reasons. Karura Caves are set of historic, naturally formed caverns located within the Karura Forest in Kiambu, serving as hideout for Mau Mau freedom fighters during the 1950s independenve struggles, the caves are also known for historical significance as stone age shelters. 70% of Karura's visitors are Kenyan citizens, there is a growing appreciation by an international clientele as witnessed by Karura having received a TripAdvisor Certificate of Excellence for two years running (2014–15) and being listed as No. 4 out of 101 Things To Do in Nairobi.

The Karura Forest Environmental Education Trust (KFEET) was formed in 2010, and launched by then Minister for Forestry and Wildlife Noah Wekesa. KFEET manages an environmental education centre located in Karura Forest and facilitating access to thousands of Kenyan school children.

== Harvesting of mature exotic trees ==
Since late 2024, the Kenyan government, through the Kenya Forest Service (KFS), has embarked on a phased approach of cutting down mature exotic trees from the Karura forest, among other forests. Exotic trees were first planted centuries ago to provide fuel during the construction of the Kenya-Uganda railway and to build houses.

The exercise is being guided by the Forest Conservation and Management Act of 2016 and the Karura Forest Participatory Forest Management Plan (PFMP), amongst other laws, and aims to restore the forest to its natural state. The cut sections of the forest are to be replaced with indigenous trees such as Markhamia that are more suitable for the ecological area. Some other sections will be left to coppice.

The exercise of replacing exotic trees with indigenous ones had been on hold for six years due to a ban on logging in public forests since 2018. The ban was lifted in mid 2023.

The targeted trees include Eucalyptus and Cypress trees. An area of 6.3 hectares within the forest has been marked for the exercise. These exotic trees, such as eucalyptus trees, have bad hydrological consequences on water resources since they absorb much of it. Moreover, the colobus monkeys in the forest cannot feed on them, unlike the native trees.

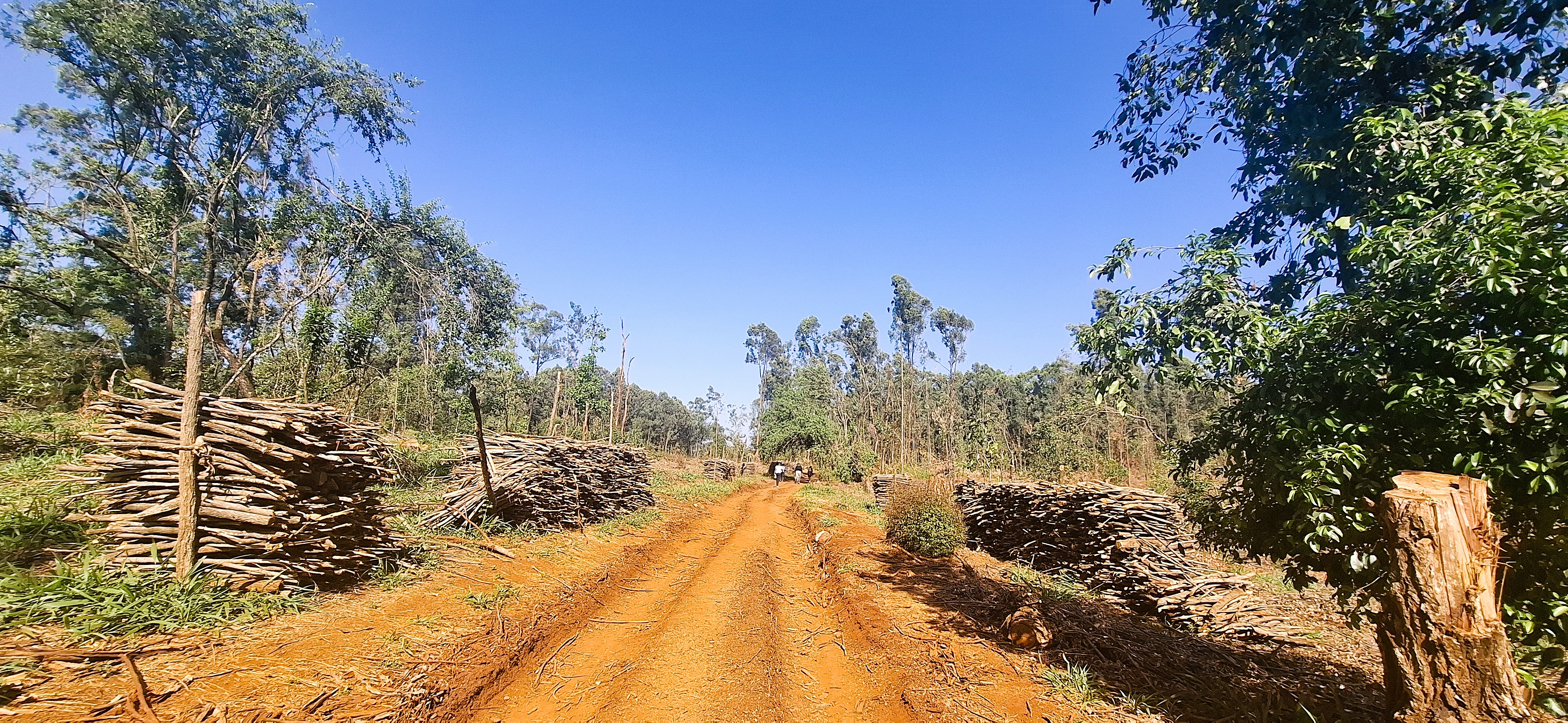
Tree cutting in Karura Forest

This move attracted much attention, with most people wrongly assuming that the forest was being cleared so as to be grabbed.

== External ==
- Kenya Forest Service
- Friends of Karura Forest
- Kenya Ministry of Wildlife
- Karura Caves
