= Morris Gachamba =

Kenyan airplane builder

- Born: Nyeri District, Kenya
- Known for: First Kenyan to build an airplane

Morris Gachamba (born 1932) is a basement mechanic in Kenya, a country in East Africa. Gachamba is known for having built and flown his own plane in 1968. Gachamba lived in his home-cum-garage at blue valley in Majengo, Nyeri town.

== Plane project ==
In the 1960s, Gachamba became friends with an English tourist he would go out fishing with. The tourist owned a small plane and took Gachamba out for a short trip around Lake Naivasha. Gachamba became enamored with flying and soon wanted to build his own. Come the 1970s, he became the first Kenyan to build an airplane.

== Education ==
Gachamba dropped out of Kenya's Standard Four after Ambrose Wambugu, a Maths teacher beat him for not being able to answer a question on addition of fractions. He has commented on his education experience, "“I was never one to remember things easily and that made me a bad student." But, that hasn't turned him off the idea of becoming a teacher. He's said, “I would really like students to come and learn from me. I have a lot of practical knowledge and I want to leave it to them.”
