= Kiawaithanji =

- Country: Kenya
- County: Nyeri
- Time zone: UTC+3 (EAT)

Kiawaithanji Village is a settlement in Nyeri County in Kenya's former Central Province.

The village has the administrative status of a Sub-Location in Gaaki Location of Nyeri County. It is located between Mutathiini and Kangaita villages and is adjacent to the Kagumo river and the teachers college named after that river - Kagumo College.

Local schools include Kiawaithanji primary school, Kiawaithanji Secondary School, Kiawaithanji PCEA academy, and Nanny Lyrle Academy.

Churches in the village including a Roman Catholic church, Baptist Church, Presbyterian Church of East Africa church, AIPCA church, and a Church of the Nazarene.
