= Mukurweini Constituency =

Constituency in Kenya

Mukurweini
- constituency for the Parliament of Kenya
- Mukurweini Constituency within Nyeri County

- Nyeri County within Kenya
- County: Nyeri
- Population: 89,137
- Area: 179 km^{2} (69.1 sq mi)

Current constituency
- Number of members: 1
- Party: UDA
- Member of Parliament: John Kaguchia
- Wards: 4

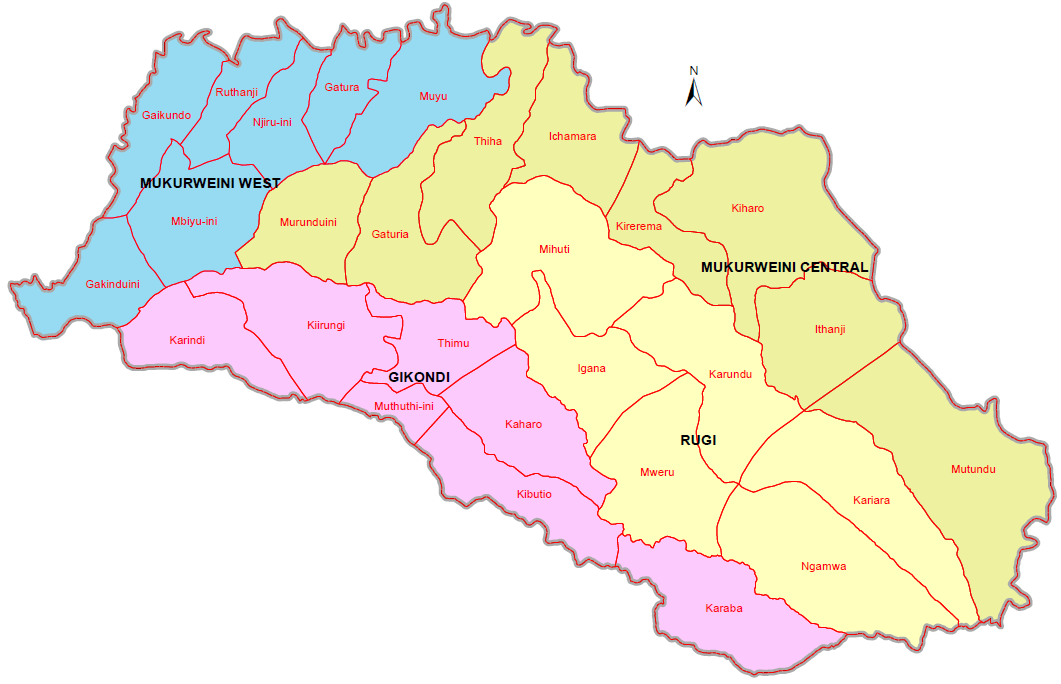
Mukurweini Constituency, IEBC, March 2012

Mukurweini Constituency is an electoral constituency in Kenya, being one of six constituencies in Nyeri County. Mukurweini Constituency comprises Mukurweini division of Nyeri County, which is administratively divided into four wards; Mukurwe-ini Central, Mukurwe-ini West, Rugi and Gikondi wards. It has approximate population of 110,000. The current member of parliament is Hon. John Kaguchia P.G. Mukurwe-ini residents are mainly farmers; coffee and dairy farming is the main agricultural activity carried out. The area does not experience extreme weather conditions and has several scenic features. Wajee Nature Park, a bird conservancy, located in Rugi ward, Giathugu Sublocation is a bird watchers paradise where rare birds are found. The lower parts of Mukurwe-ini is endowed with ball clay deposits that are used to manufacture ceramic products. Mukurwe-ini is also proud to have a vibrant industry, anchored by Wakulima Dairy, that packages milk under the brand name Royal Fresh.

== Members of Parliament ==
Elections	MP	Party	Notes
1963	Henry Clement Wariithi	KANU	One-party system
1969	Morris Mwai Koigi	KANU	One-party system
1974	Henry Clement Wariithi	KANU	One-party system
1979	Henry Clement Wariithi	KANU	One-party system
1983	Ngumbu Njururi Maiyani	KANU	One-party system.
1988	Ngumbu Njururi Maiyani	KANU	One-party system.
1992	David Muhika Mutahii	Democratic Party	
1997	David Muhika Mutahi	Democratic Party	
2002	Mutahi Kagwe	NARC	
2007	Kabando wa Kabando	Safina	
2013	Kabando wa Kabando	The National Alliance	
2017	Anthony Githiaka Kiai	Jubilee Party	
2022	John Kaguchia	United Democratic Alliance	

== Wards ==
There are 4 wards in Mukurweini constituency and 58,534 registered voters as of 2022.

Ward	Registered Voters
Mukurwe-Ini Central	19,130
Rugi	13,959
Mukurwe-Ini West	12,801
Gikondi	12,644
Total	58,534
*As of 2022
