= Majority Leader (Kenya) =

The Majority Leader is the leader of the parliamentary delegation of the largest party in the National Assembly of Kenya. Though not directly the head of government, the Majority Leader acts as the leader of the members of parliament from the ruling party. It is similar to the Leader of the House of Commons in the Westminster system. The current Majority Leader is Kimani Ichung'wah from the Kenya Kwanza party. The position was established following the introduction of the 2010 Constitution of Kenya. Under the original 1963 Constitution and during the 10th Parliament of Kenya, the Leader of Government Business was typically the Prime Minister of Kenya and later the Vice President.

== List of majority leaders ==
Portrait	Name	Term of office		Political party	President	Parliament
Portrait	Name	Took office	Left office	Political party	President	Parliament
	Aden Duale	28 March 2013	June 22, 2020	Jubilee Party	Uhuru Kenyatta	11th
	Amos Kimunya	June 22, 2020	October 6, 2022	Jubilee Party	Uhuru Kenyatta	12th
	Kimani Ichung'wah	October 6, 2022	Present	Kenya Kwanza	William Ruto	13th
