= Hanna Wendot Cheptumo =

Kenyan politician

Cabinet Secretary for Gender, Culture, the Arts and Heritage
- Incumbent
- Assumed office April 2025
- President: William Ruto
- Preceded by: Aisha Jumwa

Personal details
- Spouse: William Cheptumo
- Occupation: Lawyer, politician
- Profession: Advocate of the High Court of Kenya

Hanna Wendot Cheptumo is a Kenyan lawyer and politician. She is the Cabinet Secretary for Gender, Culture, the Arts, and Heritage, appointed by President William Ruto in April 2025.

== Political life ==
Cheptumo was nominated to the Cabinet in March 2025 as part of a reshuffle that filled the Gender docket, which had remained vacant since August 2024.She assumed office during a time of heightened concern over gender-based violence and femicide in Kenya. Her appointment was seen as both a continuation of her late husband's legacy and a strategic move to address ongoing gender-related issues in the country.

During her vetting by the National Assembly Committee on Appointments, Cheptumo made controversial remarks suggesting that many femicide victims were uneducated women, while implying that educated victims were sometimes motivated by financial gain. These comments sparked public criticism and concern among legislators and civil society groups.Despite the controversy, she was approved by Parliament and continues to serve in her Cabinet role.

== Early life ==
Cheptumo was born and raised in Kenya. She is the widow of the late Baringo Senator William Cheptumo, who died in February 2025.

== Education ==
Cheptumo furthered her education at the University of Nairobi, where she obtained a Bachelor of Laws (LLB) degree. She later obtained a Postgraduate Diploma in Law from the Kenya School of Law and a Diploma in Cooperative Management from the Cooperative College of Kenya. She has extensive experience in public service and legal practice.

== Career ==
She co-managed the family’s legal practice and previously served as a cooperative officer at Nyayo House. In the year 2006 she was admitted as an Advocate of the High Court of Kenya till to date, marking the beginning of a distinguished legal career.
