= Maʽalim ʽAli ʽAden =

Somali politician

Deputy Minister for Religious Affairs of Somalia
- Incumbent
- Assumed office 6 February 2015
- Prime Minister: Omar Abdirashid Ali Sharmarke

Personal details
- Born: Somalia
- Party: Independent

Maʽalim ʽAli ʽAden is a Somali politician. He is the Deputy Minister for Religious Affairs of Somalia, having been appointed to the position on 6 February 2015 by Prime Minister Omar Abdirashid Ali Sharmarke.
