= Nyeri Town Constituency =

Kenyan electoral constituency

Nyeri Town Constituency is an electoral constituency in Kenya. It is one of six constituencies in Nyeri County. The constituency in its current form was established for the 1988 elections, after splitting of former Nyeri Constituency into two; Tetu Constituency and Nyeri Town constituency.

== Members of Parliament ==
Elections	MP	Party	Notes
1988	Waruru Kanja	KANU	One-party system.
1990	Waihenya Ndirangu	KANU	By-elections, one party system
1992	Isaiah Mwai Mathenge	Democratic Party	
1997	Wanyiri Kihoro	Democratic Party	
2002	Peter Gichohi Mureithi	NARC	
2007	Esther Murugi Mathenge	PNU	
2013	Esther Murugi Mathenge	TNA	First MP for the Area to get a second term
2017	Ngunjiri Wambugu	JP	
2022	Duncan Maina Mathenge	UDA	

2027 kenyan general elections {2027}} //Ngujiri Wambugu]]// Gachagua allies party one umbrella(Kenya)

== Wards ==
Ward	MCA
Gatitu/Muruguru Ward	Hon. Wangechi Njithi
Kamakwa/Mukaro Ward	John Ndumia Mwangi
Kiganjo/Mathari Ward	Margaret Muthoni Kuruga
Ruring'u Ward	Samuel Kariuki Gichuki
Rware Ward	Paul Gichuhi Kanyari
*September 2005,
