= Aden Duale =

Kenyan Cabinet Secretary for Health

Aden Duale EGH
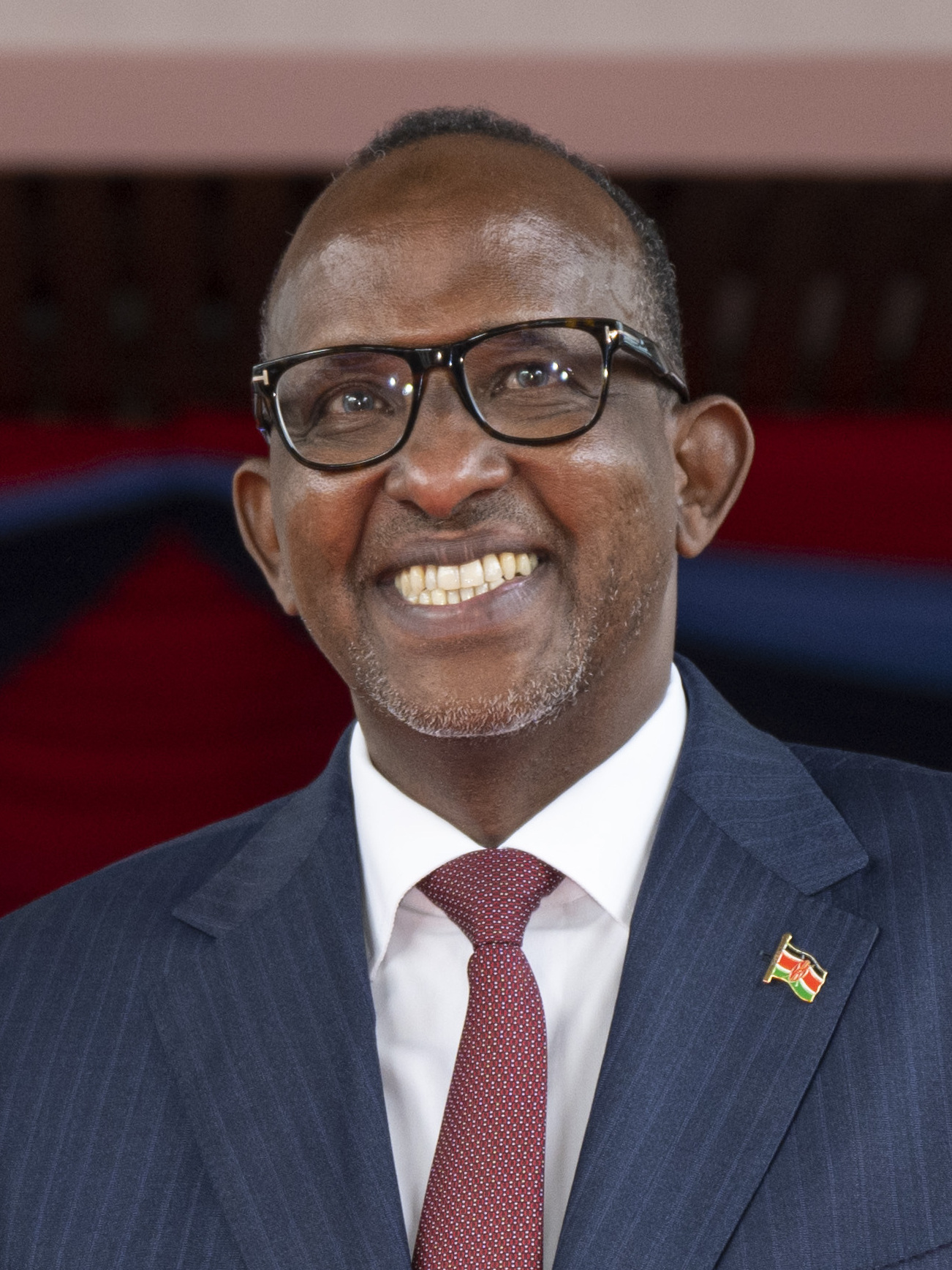
- Duale in September 2023

Cabinet Secretary for Defence
- In office 31 October 2022 – 11 July 2024
- President: William Ruto
- Preceded by: Eugene Wamalwa
- Succeeded by: Soipan Tuya

Cabinet Secretary for Health
- Incumbent
- Assumed office 25 March 2025
- President: William Ruto
- Preceded by: Deborah Mlongo Barasa

Majority Leader
- In office 28 March 2013 – June 22, 2020
- President: Uhuru Kenyatta
- Succeeded by: Amos Kimunya

Member of Parliament for Dujis
- In office 2007–2022
- Preceded by: Hussein Maalim Mohamed
- Succeeded by: Dekow Mohamed Barrow

Personal details
- Born: 15 June 1969 (age 57) Garissa County, Kenya
- Education: Moi Forces Academy, Nairobi
- Alma mater: Moi University; Jomo Kenyatta University of Agriculture & Technology

Aden Bare Duale EGH (Somali: Aadan Barre Ducaale) is a Kenyan politician who serves as the Cabinet Secretary of Health since his 2025. He previously served as the Cabinet Secretary for Defence in the cabinet of President William Ruto, having assumed the position on 31 October 2022. He was dismissed on 11 July 2024 and then reinstated on 19 July 2024 in a different capacity as Cabinet Secretary Ministry of Environment, Climate Change and Forestry before being moved to Ministry of Health.

A former Member of the National Assembly for Garissa Township Constituency, Duale served as the Majority Leader of the National Assembly under the Jubilee Party in the 11th Parliament from 2013 to 2017 and in the 12th Parliament from 2017 to 2020, when he was ousted for perceived disloyalty to former President Uhuru Kenyatta, the Jubilee Party leader. He was first elected in 2007 under the Orange Democratic Movement (ODM), but left the party in 2009, teaming up with Ruto to form the United Republican Party.

== Early life and education ==
Duale received his Certificate of Primary Education from Garissa Primary School in 1981. He then enrolled in Garissa High School where he received his Kenya Certificate of Secondary Education in 1985, and later joined Moi Forces Academy, Nairobi for his Kenya Advanced Certificate of Secondary Education, which he completed in 1987. He enrolled in Moi University for his undergraduate studies in education before transferring to Jomo Kenyatta University of Agriculture and Technology for his master's degree in business administration (MBA).

== Early career ==
In 1992, Duale began his teaching career as a graduate teacher at Sankuri Secondary School. He did, however, leave after two months and thereafter worked for six months as a clerical officer at the office of the provincial commissioner in Garissa. After that, he worked for their family business until becoming a director for Kenya Broadcasting Cooperation from 1999 to 2003. He is the Livestock Marketing Society of Kenya's co-founder and CEO.

== Political career ==
=== Member of the National Assembly ===
Duale has served as a representative of the Dujis Constituency in the National Assembly of Kenya since the 2007 parliamentary elections. After initially being elected with the Orange Democratic Movement, he switched parties for the 2013 elections, and won re-election as a member of the United Republican Party. He also served as an assistant minister in the Ministry of Livestock Development between 2008 and 2013. In the 11th Parliament he was a member of the House Business and House Broadcasting Committees, while in the 12th Parliament he was a member of the House Business Committee.

He is known for sponsoring a bill which many consider 'a bill that killed student activism in Universities'. The bill introduced the electoral college system as opposed to the previous direct democracy system where university students directly elected their leaders. It required that students' associations would be constituted into electoral colleges based on their academic departments, schools, or faculties. During his time as leader of the majority, Duale was the sponsor of an unsuccessful 2018 bill that would have reserved one in three seats in parliament for women.

== Cabinet position ==
Duale was appointed defence cabinet secretary in Ruto's first cabinet in 2022. Early in his tenure as Cabinet Secretary for Defence, Duale officially deployed troops to eastern Democratic Republic of Congo to join an East African Community Joint Regional Force aiming to combat armed groups in the region.

On 23 May 2024, Duale was among the guests invited to the state dinner hosted by U.S. President Joe Biden in honor of President Ruto at the White House.

A cabinet reshuffle in July 2024 saw Duale removed from the defence docket and appointed to the Environment, Climate Change and Forestry docket. He was later removed and on 25 March 2025, he took over the mantle to lead the Ministry of Health as the Cabinet Secretary for Health from his predecessor Deborah Mlongo Barasa after another cabinet reshuffle.

His tenure as Health CS has been riddled with scandals, the most recent one being the Social Health Authority Scandal where many "ghost" hospitals have claimed treatment payments worth billions of shillings with other existing hospitals falsifying patient records to receive money for services never offered to patients. This has led to Kenyans and the opposition calling him out to resign for failing to address this with some accusing him of being complicit in the financial malfeasance. He has however maintained that he will not resign saying that his duty is to fix the country's health sector. There have been threats for his impeachment from a section of lawmakers over the same. He still maintains his stance and continues to serve the country under the docket.

In January 2026, new claims of fraudulent activities where Ksh.11 billion was lost within six months within the Social Health Authority arose which he dismissed. He said, "When I went there, that time I denied (it). After three weeks, I realized there was some truth about why Kenyans called it Mafia House, but today it is Afya House. Why should I resign? I don't need to resign. If I commit anything contrary to my oath of office, there are various ways of dealing with me: impeaching me by Parliament; the criminal justice system dealing with me if I have integrity issues; I'm a political appointee, the President can one morning say I need another minister for Health,"

== Political positions ==
In 2014, Duale argued that homosexuality in Kenya was "as serious as terrorism", but argued against stepping up legal sanctions on the grounds that the Kenyan constitution and the penal code were tough enough.

== Personal life ==
A Kenyan of Somali descent, Duale has a wife and five sons. His eldest son is in university while the youngest is in kindergarten.
