= Eric Muriithi Muga =

Kenyan Cabinet Secretary

Eric Mugaa

Cabinet Secretary for Water, Sanitation and Irrigation
- Incumbent
- Assumed office 8 August 2024
- Nominated by: William Ruto
- Preceded by: Alice Wahome

Personal details
- Born: Eric Muriithi Mugaa; 14 July 1992 (age 34) Athi, Meru District, Eastern Province, Kenya
- Education: University of Nairobi

Eric Muriithi Mugaa (born 14 July 1992) is the current Kenyan Cabinet Secretary in charge of the Ministry of Water, Sanitation, and Irrigation. At 32 years old, Eric was appointed as the youngest member of President William Ruto's cabinet on July 19, 2024. He hails from Athi, Igembe South, Meru County, and is a civil engineer by profession.

Eric studied at Lenana School from 2006 to 2009. He later on enrolled to the University of Nairobi for his undergraduate studies. Eric holds a Master’s degree in Civil Engineering with a specialization in Water Resources from the University of Nairobi. Eric joined the list of young Kenyans serving in President Ruto's administration.

On August 2, 2024, he appeared before the Parliamentary Committee on Appointments for vetting, where he declared his wealth at Ksh. 31 million. Upon approval by Parliament, Eric was sworn in as Cabinet Secretary on August 8, 2024.
