= Susan Nakhumicha Wafula =

Kenyan logistics expert and politician

- Born: Kitale, Kenya
- Citizenship: Kenya
- Education: Kenya Medical Training College (Diploma in Pharmacy); Kenya Institute of Management (Diploma in Healthcare Management); Jomo Kenyatta University of Agriculture and Technology (Bachelor's Degree in Procurement and Management, MIT, USA) (Master of Science in Supply Chain Management) (Doctor of Philosophy in Business Management)
- Occupations: Logistics expert, Politician
- Years active: 21
- Known for: Public service

Susan Nakhumicha Wafula (née: Susan Nakhumicha) is a Kenyan politician and former cabinet secretary of health and supply chain expert in the Cabinet of Kenya. Beyond the KMTC diploma, she has a first class honours bachelor in Procurement and Logistics from JKUAT. Before that she oversaw the supply chain for the Global Programme for Research and Training at the University of California, San Francisco (UCSF).

== Background and education ==
Reliable Kenyan online sources report that she was born in the town of Kitale, in the Trans-Nzoia County.

After attending primary and secondary school, she was admitted to the Kenya Medical Training College (KMTC), where she graduated with a Diploma in Pharmacy. She then enrolled at the Kenya Institute of Management (KIM), where she obtained a Diploma in Healthcare Management.

In 2012 she claims that she was admitted to the Jomo Kenyatta University of Agriculture and Technology (JKUAT) where she obtained a Bachelor's Degree in Procurement and Management followed by a Master of Science in Supply Chain Management. All these are however unverifiable including an online pharmacy degree that she claims to have studied at Ege University, Turkey but the University refuted the claims by assuring the public that they do not offer online degree courses.

== Career ==
=== Before politics ===
For a period of time, she worked at Mission for Essential Drugs and Supplies (MEDS), a Catholic NGO in Kenya. She also worked at the Nairobi Women's Hospital as the manager of procurement and logistics. Earlier in her career, she served as the Pharmaceutical Technologist-in-charge of the AAR Healthcare Kisumu Branch. At the time she was appointed Cabinet Secretary for Health, she worked as the Head of Supply Chain at the Institute for Global Health Sciences of the University of California, San Francisco.

=== Political career ===
In 2022, she joined Kenya's elective politics. She contested for the Trans-Nzoia Women's Constituency seat on the Ford Kenya political party ticket. She lost to the incumbent, Lillian Chebet Siyoi Walubengo of the United Democratic Alliance (Kenya).
