= Hussein Maalim Mohamed =

Kenyan politician

Hussein Maalim

Minister of State in Kenya
- In office 1983 – Jan. 2002

Personal details
- Born: Sankuri, Kenya
- Nickname: Hussein Maendeleo

Hussein Maalim Mohamed (Somali: Huseen Maalim Maxamed) is a Kenyan politician. He is a former Minister of State in the office of the president.

== Career ==
Mohamed was born to an ethnic Somali family from the Abdulwak sub-clan of the Ogaden Darod. His older brother Mahamoud Mohamed was the Chief of General Staff of the Kenya Defence Forces, and was responsible for successfully suppressing the 1982 coup d'état attempt against then President of Kenya Daniel arap Moi.

In 1983, Hussein became the first Somali and Kenyan Muslim to be appointed to Kenya's cabinet, when he was named Minister of State in the office of the presidency.

== See also ==
- Mahamoud Mohamed
- Aden Bare Duale
- Ahmed Issack Hassan
