= Deborah Mlongo Barasa =

Kenyan physician and politician

- Born: Kenya
- Citizenship: Kenya
- Education: University of Nairobi (Bachelor of Medicine and Bachelor of Surgery) (Master of Medicine in Internal Medicine); London School of Hygiene and Tropical Medicine (Master of Science in Infectious Diseases)
- Occupations: Consultant physician, Politician
- Years active: 18
- Known for: Cabinet Secretary, Government of the Republic of Kenya
- Title: Cabinet Secretary for Environment, Climate Change & Forestry

Deborah Mlongo Barasa, also Debra Mulongo Barasa (née: Mlongo), is a Kenyan consultant internist, infectious diseases expert and politician. She was the Cabinet Secretary of health in the cabinet of Kenya, from August 2024 until 1 April 2025. Prior to that, she was an infectious diseases consultant at the World Health Organization, based in Nairobi, Kenya.

== Background and education ==
She is a Kenyan national. She graduated in 2006, from the University of Nairobi (UoN), with a Bachelor of Medicine and Bachelor of Surgery degree. Later, she obtained a Master of Medicine in Internal Medicine, also from UoN. As of July 2024, she was pursuing a Master of Science degree in infectious diseases, from the London School of Hygiene and Tropical Medicine.

== Career ==
=== Before politics ===
At the WHO hub in Nairobi, Kenya, she established infectious diseases programmes in Eastern and Southern Africa and "supported member states in developing and implementing national action plans, in addition to offering technical guidance on global policies and guidelines". Her core competencies include internal medicine, infectious diseases, communicable and non-communicable disease prevention. For a period of time she worked as an internal medicine physician at The Mater Misericordiae Hospital, in the Nairobi Industrial Area and as consultant internist at CHANF Community Health Services, based in Kitengela, Kajiado County.

Political career

On 19 July 2024, one week after sacking his entire cabinet, William Ruto, the Kenyan head of State, nominated 11 new cabinet secretaries. Deborah Mlongo Barasa was nominated as cabinet secretary for health. After approval by the vetting panel in Parliament, she replaced former Health Cabinet Secretary, Susan Nakhumicha Wafula. Mlongo Barasa was sworn in as the Cabinet Secretary for Health on Thursday, 8 August 2024, a position she held until 1 April 2025. She was replaced by Aden Duale at the health ministry and was appointed as the Cabinet Secretary for Environment, Climate Change & Forestry. Later in 2025 she was the Cabinet Secretary, Ministry of Environment, Climate Change and Forestry when she and Jane Makori met a Chinese delegation.
