= Nyeri County =

Coordinates: 0°25′S 36°57′E

- County
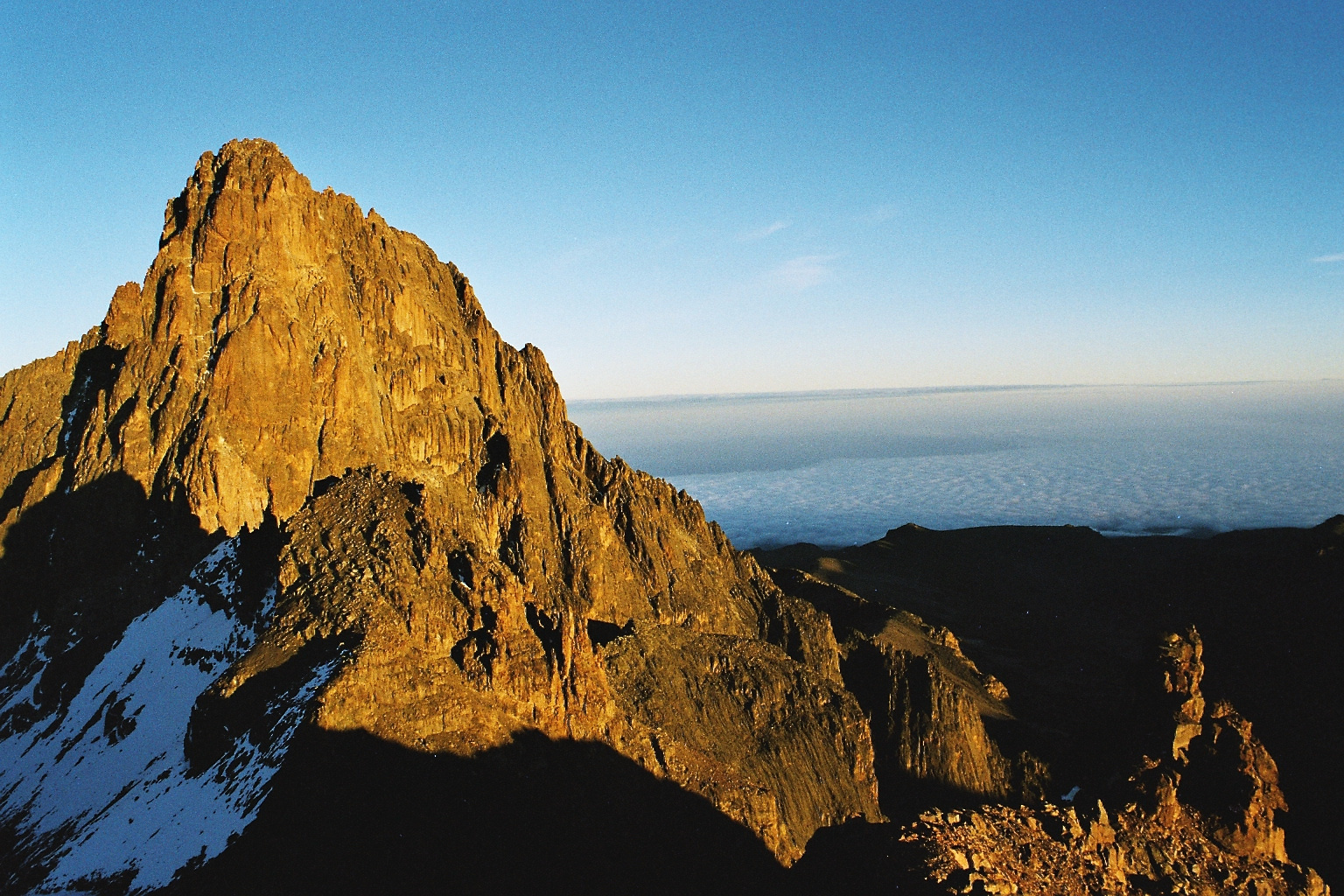
- Mount Kenya

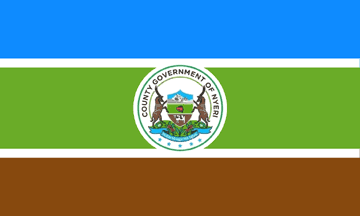
- Flag

- Location in Kenya
- Country: Kenya
- Formed: 4 March 2013
- Capital: Nyeri

Government
  - Governor: Mutahi Kahiga

Area
  - Total: 3,325.0 km^{2} (1,283.8 sq mi)

Population (2019)
  - Total: 759,164
  - Density: 228.32/km^{2} (591.3/sq mi)
- Time zone: UTC+3 (EAT)
- GDP (PPP): ▲$5.657B (14th)
- Per Capita (PPP): ▲$6,841 (3rd)
- Per Capita (nominal): ▲$2,512 (3rd)
- GDP (nominal): ▲$2.077B (14th)
- HDI (2023): 0.678 (3rd): medium
- Website: nyeri.go.ke

Nyeri County is a county located in the Mount Kenya region of Kenya. Its capital and largest town is Nyeri. It had a population of 759,164 according to the 2019 census and an area of 2361 km^{2}.

Mutahi Kahiga was governor as of 2022. Previous governors include Nderitu Gachagua, who died while receiving treatment in London, Wamathai Samuel Githaiga, and Wahome Gakuru, who died in a road accident at Kabati near Kenol heading towards Thika Super Highway. It is also the home county of the third president of Kenya, the late President Mwai Kibaki.

== Demographics ==
=== Religion ===
Religion in Nyeri County

Religion (2019 Census)	Number
Catholicism	210, 407
Protestant	285,723
Evangelical Christianity	145,046
African Instituted Churches	68,441
Orthodox	4,772
Other Christian Groups	21,342
Islam	4,501
Hindu	171
Traditionists	575
Other	4,578
Atheists	6,102
Don't Know	1,001
Not Stated	36

== People ==
The county is located on the southwest flank of Mount Kenya. Local people are predominantly of the Kikuyu ethnicity.

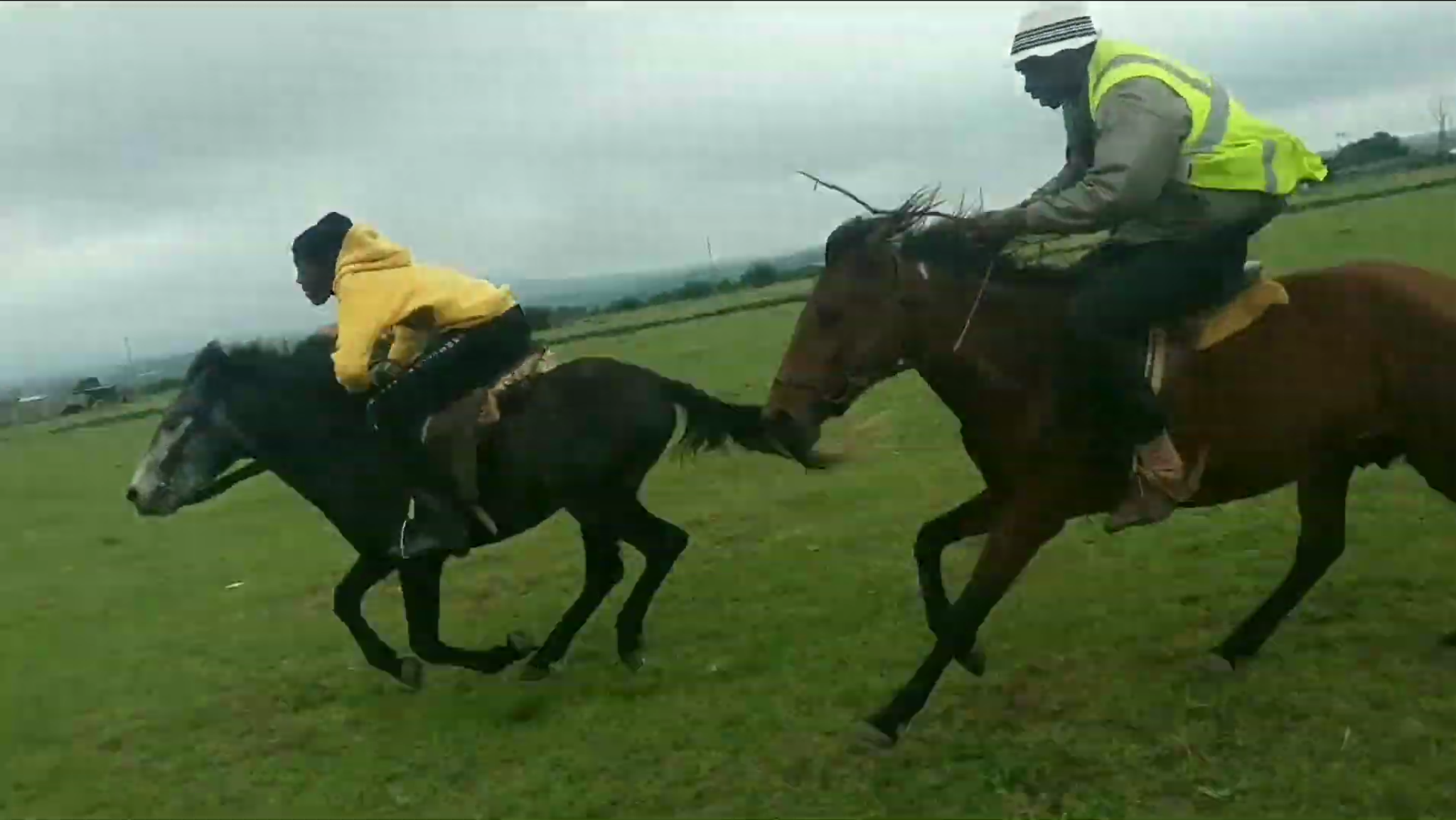
Horse riding as a means of transport in the mountainous area

Historical population
Year	Pop.	±%
1979	486,477	—
1989	607,292	+24.8%
1999	661,156	+8.9%
2009	693,558	+4.9%
2019	759,164	+9.5%

== Local authorities ==
Authority	Type	Population*	Urban pop.*
Nyeri	Municipality	98,908	46,969
Karatina	Municipality	6,852	6,852
Othaya	Town	21,427	4,108
Nyeri county	County	533,969	10,047
* 1999 census. Source:

LOCAL GOVERNMENT

In reference to the 2022 general elections, the 3rd County Assembly was successfully formed. Its members are as follows:

Speaker – Hon. James Gichuhi Mwangi

Deputy Speaker - Hon. Samuel Kariuki Gichuki, MCA Ruring'u Ward

Majority Leader - Hon. James Kanyugo Mwangi, MCA Mahiga Ward

Majority Whip - Hon. Sabastian Mugo Theuri, Majority Whip, MCA Wamagana Ward

Elected MCAs

Name	Ward	Political Party
Hon. Atanasio Kabaire Gichohi	Mukurwe-ini West	UDA
Hon. Gathagu Stephen Kigotho	Gikondi	UDA
Hon. Gichuhi Jackson Kabingu	Magutu	UDA
Hon. Kabatha David Mwangi	Iria-ini	UDA
Hon. Kagwi Cyrus Ngure	Rugi	UDA
Hon. Kamau Martin Matu	Naromoru-Kiamathaga	UDA
Hon. Kanyi Patrick Wachira	Thegu River	IND
Hon. Kawanjiku Njuguna Wanjiku	Mweiga Ward	UDA
Hon. Kibiru Cyrus Ndiritu	Mukurwe-ini Central	IND
Hon. Kiragu Simon Mbogo	Rware	UDA
Hon. Kuruga Margaret Muthoni	Kiganjo/Mathari	IND
Hon. Mbichi Christopher Wambugu	Mwiyogo/Endarasha	UDA
Hon. Muriuki Erastus Karanja	Ruguru	UDA
Hon. Mwangi Johnstone Kamau	Mugunda	UDA
Hon. Ndagita Anthony Muriithi Maina	Kirimukuyu	UDA
Hon. Ndaini Julius Kamiri	Konyu	UDA
Hon. Ndegwa Clement Warutere	Gatarakwa	UDA
Hon. Njithi Ziporah Wangechi	Gatitu Muruguru	UDA
Hon. Nyaga Wilfred Wambari	Iria-ini	UDA
Hon. Taiti Jonah Kamau	Kamakwa/Mukaro	UDA
Hon. Thuku Meshack Kiruga	Chinga	UDA
Hon. Wachira Charity Wangui	Gakawa	UDA
Hon. Wahinya Gibson Kuria	Dedan Kimathi	UDA
Hon. Wakibia Stanely Ngaru	Aguthi/Gaaki	IND
Hon. Wambui Patrick Muriithi	Kabaru Ward	UDA
Hon. Wanderi Eunice Wagaki	Karima	ANC
Hon. Weru Watson Mburungo	Karatina Town	UDA

Nominated MCAs

Name	Position	Party
Hon. Gichuki Pauline Nyokabi	People With Disabilities	UDA
Hon. Kamiru Janet Muthoni	Gender	UDA
Hon. Macharia Agnes Wanjiru	Ethnicity	UDA
Hon. Mwangi Jane Wandia	Ethnicity	UDA
Hon. Mwangi Priscilla Thanji	Gender	UDA
Hon. Nderitu Fidelis Wangui	Gender	UDA
Hon. Nyawira Emma Wangui	Gender	UDA
Hon. Thumbi Ann Muthoni	Gender	UDA
Hon. Wachira Agnes Wanjiku	Gender	UDA
Hon. Wambui Kelvin Kariithi	Youth	UDA
Hon. Wanyitu Lucy Mugure	Gender	UDA

== Administrative divisions ==
Sub-counties	Population*	Urban pop.*	Headquarters
Kieni east	0	0	Naro Moru
Kieni west	0	0	Mweiga
Mathira east	0	0	Karatina
Mukurwe-ini	0	0	Mukurwe-ini
Nyeri Central	0	0	Nyeri
Nyeri South(Othaya)	0	3,846	Othaya
Tetu	0	2,022	Wamagana
Mathira West	0		Kaiyaba
* 1999 census. Sources: , ,

== Constituencies ==
The county has six constituencies:

- Tetu Constituency
- Kieni Constituency
- Mathira Constituency
- Othaya Constituency
- Mukurweini Constituency
- Nyeri Town Constituency

== Central Kenya Region ==
=== Urbanisation ===
Urbanisation in Central Kenya
County	Urbanisation in Central Kenya (Per cent)
Kiambu County	60.8
Nyeri County	54.21
Nyandarua County	18.5
Muranga County	16.3
Kirinyaga County	15.8
Kenya Average	32.3
Urbanisation by County in Central Kenya

Source: OpenDataKenya

=== Wealth/poverty level ===
Wealth/Poverty Level in Central Kenya
County	Poverty Level in Central Kenya (Per cent)
Kirinyaga County	20.0
Muranga County	28.5
Kiambu County	28.9
Nyeri County	19.30
Nyandarua County	46.6
Kenya Average	45.9
Poverty level by County

Source: OpenDataKenya Worldbank

== Education ==
Secondary schools

- Kenyatta High School (Mahiga)
- Chinga Boys High School
- Othaya Boys High School
- Karima Boys High School
- Endarasha Boys High School
- Kagumo High School (National)
- Nyeri High School
- Kanjuri Boys High School
- Dedan Kimathi Boys
- Chinga Girls High School
- Mahiga Girls High School
- Othaya Girls High School
- Naromoru Girls High School
- Gatarakwa Girls High School
- Bishop Gatimu Ngandu Girls(National)
- Tumutumu Girls High School
- Kangubiri Girls High School
- Muruguru Girls High School
- South Tetu Girls High School
- Mukurwe-ini Boys High school
- Kaheti Boys High school
- Birithia Girls
- Kiriti Day Secondary
- Naromoru Boys
- Moi Equator Girls

Colleges

- Kamwenja Teachers college
- Kagumo Teachers college
- Kmtc Nyeri campus
- Kmtc Othaya
- Kmtc Mukurweini
- Mathenge Technical College

Universities

- Karatina university
- Dedan Kimathi university
- Nyeri National polytechnic

== See also ==
- Morris Gachamba
- Gathukimundu
- Gathuthi
- Kiawaithanji
- Munyange
