= Sicily Kariuki =

Kenyan politician

Sicily Kariūki

Cabinet Secretary for Water, Sanitation and Irrigation
- Incumbent
- Assumed office 14 January 2020
- President: Uhuru Kenyatta
- Succeeded by: Mūtahi Kagwe

Personal details
- Born: Ol Kalou, Kenya
- Party: ODM
- Education: University of Nairobi (Bachelor's degree); Eastern and Southern African Management Institute (Master of Business Administration); Michigan State University (Postgraduate Diploma in Law and Regulation)

Sicily Kanini Kariūki is a Kenyan politician who has been the Cabinet Secretary for Water, Sanitation and Irrigation, since 20 January 2020. She was previously the Cabinet Secretary for Health. She was also previously the Cabinet Secretary for Public Service, Youth and Gender Affairs, from December 2015 until January 2018.

== Early life and education ==
Kariūki was born in Kiambu County, Kenya.

Kariūki has a bachelor's degree, from the University of Nairobi. Her Master of Business Administration (MBA) degree, was awarded by the Eastern and Southern African Management Institute (ESAMI) in conjunction with Maastricht School of Management in the Netherlands. She also has a Postgraduate Diploma in Law and Regulation, from Michigan State University in the United States.

== Career before politics ==
Kariūki enjoyed a wide-ranging career in the business world, including as an officer of the Kenya Investment Authority, and as chief executive officer of Fresh Produce Exporters Association of Kenya.

Kariūki then served as the Managing Director and CEO of "Tea Board of Kenya". In 2012, while at the helm of the tea board, the tea industry rose to become the top earner of foreign exchange in the country, accounting for KSh130 billion (approx. US$1.3 billion), in 2012. She also served as the Principal Secretary, in the Department of Agriculture, in the Kenyan Ministry of Agriculture, Livestock and Fisheries.

== Political career ==
In December 2015, Kariūki was appointed as the Cabinet Secretary for Public Service, Youth and Gender Affairs. She served in that capacity until January 2018, when she was appointed Cabinet Secretary for Health.

In her capacity as minister, Kariūki was appointed by WHO Director-General Tedros Adhanom Ghebreyesus to serve on the Independent High-level Commission on Non-Communicable Diseases from 2018 until 2019.

== See also ==
- Raychelle Omamo
- Judy Wakhungu
- Phyllis Kandie
