= Government of Kenya =

National legislative, executive and judiciary powers of Kenya

Government of Kenya Swahili: Serikali ya Kenya
- Coat of arms of Kenya
- Formation: 1963
- Jurisdiction: Republic of Kenya
- Website: gok.kenya.go.ke

Legislative branch
- Legislature: Parliament of Kenya
- Meeting place: Parliament Buildings

Executive branch
- Leader: President of Kenya
- Appointer: Direct popular vote
- Headquarters: State House
- Main organ: Cabinet (22 Ministries of Kenya)

Judicial branch
- Court: Supreme Court
- Seat: Nairobi

The Government of the Republic of Kenya (GoK) is the national government of the Republic of Kenya located in East Africa. It is composed of 47 counties, each county with its own semi-autonomous governments, including the national capital of Nairobi, where the national government is primarily based.

The national government is composed of three distinct branches: The Legislature (Parliament), the Executive and the Judiciary. Each arm is independent of the other and their individual roles are set by the Constitution of Kenya while their powers and duties are further defined by acts of Parliament.

== Naming ==
The full name of the country is the "Republic of Kenya". Its official Swahili name is "Jamhuri ya Kenya". No other names appear in the Constitution, and these are the names that appear on the country's currency, in treaties, and in legal cases to which the nation is a party.

Other terms such as "GoK", "GK" and "Serikali" are often used officially and informally to distinguish the national government from the county governments.

== History ==
The Government's structure consists of power shared between the national government and the county governments. It is a unitary state with a decentralised system as per the new Constitution of Kenya 2010.

Originally the central government delegated power through devolution since gaining independence from the United Kingdom in 1963 until the country held a referendum in 2010 to amend the Constitution, among which amendments was the devolving of certain powers and duties of the national government to the semi-autonomous governments of the newly created counties.

The country was initially led by a Prime Minister, but upon the country becoming a full republic in 1964, the Prime Minister's title was changed to President of Kenya.

The current structure of government allows power to be held on two levels: the national level and the county level.

The country is a representative democracy legislatively, and a direct democracy in the election of its president, who is leader of the Executive branch of government.

== Legislative branch ==
The Legislative branch is known as the Parliament of Kenya, and is established under Chapter Eight of the Constitution. It is bicameral, comprising the National Assembly and the Senate. The Legislature is primarily mandated with legislation within the country and is organised as follows:

=== Makeup of Parliament ===
==== The National Assembly ====
The National Assembly is made up of 349 elected members (known as Member of Parliament or MP), consisting of 290 members elected from constituencies within the counties, 47 women elected at county-level, 12 nominated representatives and the Speaker, who is an ex-officio member. Each of the 290 members represents the constituency from where they were elected. The members of Parliament serve five-year terms..

In order to be elected as a member of the National Assembly, an individual must be registered as a voter, satisfies any requirements prescribed by the Constitution or by an act of Parliament and is nominated by a political party, or is an independent candidate.

All members are elected or nominated, including the Speaker, who is elected from persons qualified to be elected as members of Parliament but are not members.

==== Senate ====
In contrast, the Senate is made up of 47 Senators representing each of the 47 counties, 16 women nominated by political parties according to the parties' proportions in the Senate, one man and woman to represent the youth, one man and woman to represent persons with disabilities, and the Speaker, who is also an ex-officio member like the National Assembly's Speaker.

==== Separate powers ====
The National Assembly and Senate each have particular powers. The National Assembly mainly deals with legislation affecting the country at the national level as well as exercising oversight over the national government while the Senate mainly deals with legislation concerning counties as well as exercising oversight over the county governments. However, both Houses' approval is required in any matter so determined by an act of Parliament, such as presidential appointments to the Executive and Judiciary, military officers and ambassadors.

==== County Assembly ====
The 47 counties also have a legislative branch within their governments known as the County Assembly, made up of elected Members of the County Assembly (MCA) as per the number of wards within the county and nominated members. The county assembly is responsible for legislation at the county level in furtherance of the counties' functions and powers as stated in the Constitution.

== Executive branch ==
The executive branch is established by Chapter Nine of the Constitution, which vests the country's executive authority in the President of Kenya. The president is both the country's head of state (performing ceremonial functions) and the head of government (the chief executive).

=== President ===
The President is the head of state and government, as in most republics. The President is also the Commander-in-chief of the Kenya Defence Forces.

The President is the head of the country's Cabinet, which consists of the President, the Deputy President, the Attorney-General and Cabinet Secretaries nominated and appointed by the President with the approval of the National Assembly.

The National Assembly with at least a third of all the members, may set in motion an act to impeach the President. The National Assembly may do so on the grounds of gross violation of the Constitution or any other law, where there is reasons to believing that the President has committed a crime under national or international law or for gross misconduct.

If the motion to impeach passes in the National Assembly the act to impeach moves to the Senate and if at least two-thirds of all the members of the Senate vote to uphold any impeachment charge, the President shall cease to hold office.

=== Deputy President ===
The Deputy President is the second-highest executive office in the republic. The position before the 2013 general election was known as the Vice-President of Kenya. There have been 12 deputy presidents since independence.

The incumbent is Kithure Kindiki who as William Ruto is part of the Kenya Kwanza. The first person to hold the position was Jaramogi Oginga Odinga. The 8th person to hold the office, Michael Kijana Wamalwa was the first and only person to pass away while in office. George Saitoti has held the position twice on separate occasions.

The Deputy President's functions are to be the main assistant to the President and shall deputise for the President in the execution of the President's functions. He must be qualified to become president in order to take the office as he is first in line in the order of presidential succession.

The Deputy President as the president is limited to two terms in office.

The coat of arms of Kenya

The Government is run by the Ministries of Kenya. The constitution limits the number of Ministries to a minimum of 14 and maximum of 22. The headings of the ministries are known as Cabinet Secretaries who are all nominated by the President. The President has power to assign and dismiss a Cabinet Secretary.

A Cabinet Secretary cannot be an MP and their deputies are known as Principal Secretaries.

All civil servants e.g. teachers in public schools or diplomats fall under one of the ministries in the Cabinet.

=== The Judiciary ===
The Judiciary is charged with applying and upholding the law. This is done through a legal system consisting of courts.

==== The Court System ====
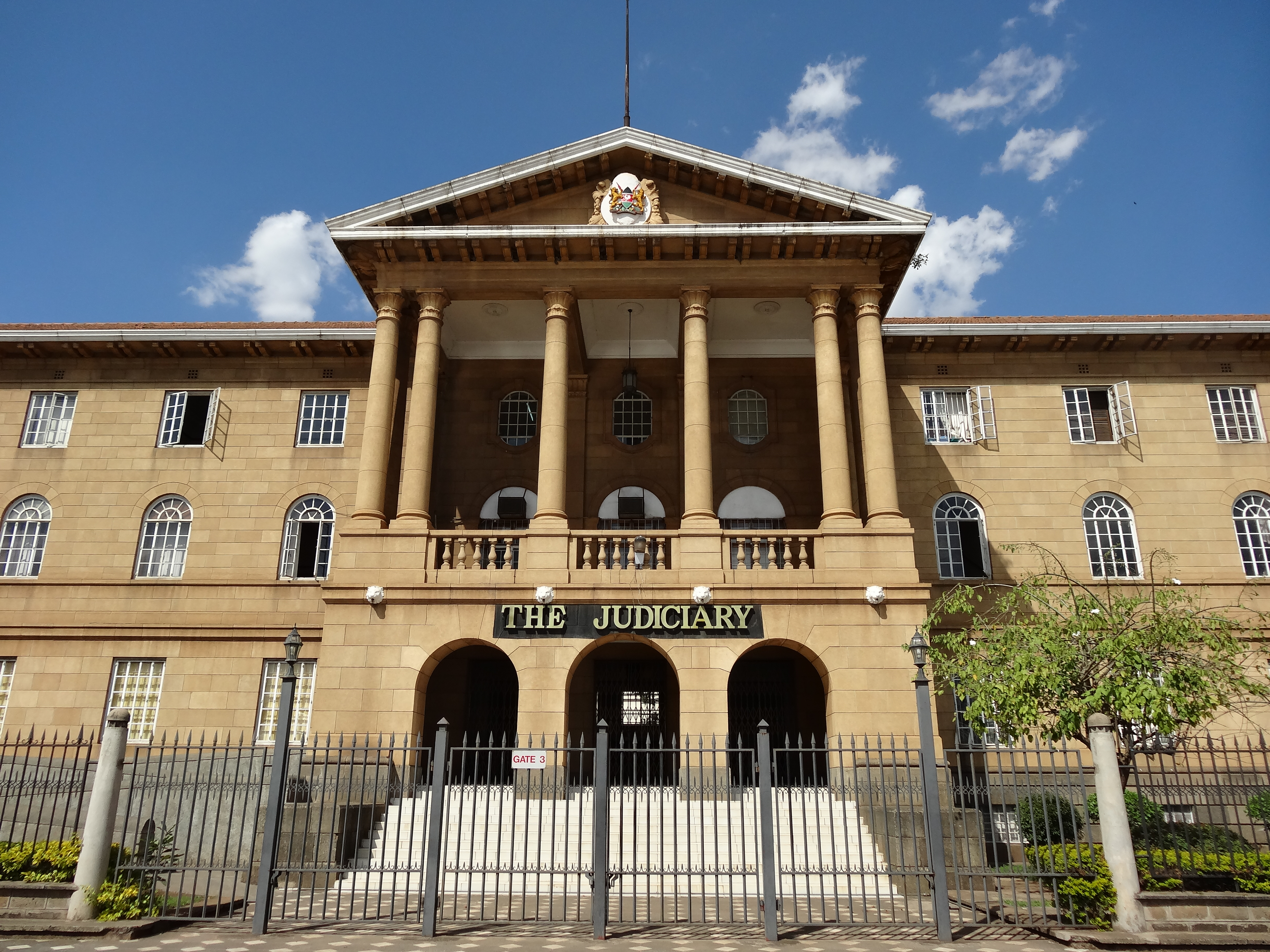
Supreme Court Buildings

The Judiciary is led by the Chief Justice. The Chief Justice sits at the Supreme Court whose court decisions are binding to all courts. The current Chief Justice is Chief Justice Martha Koome who is the fifteenth person to hold the office.

The courts are divided into two levels: Superior Courts and Subordinate Courts. Superior Courts are the higher courts and are presided over by Judges. These are the Supreme Court, the Court of Appeal, the High Court which hears almost every type of case., the Environment and Land Court and the Industrial Court.

The subordinate courts consist of the Magistrates courts, the Kadhi courts, the Courts Martial and any other court or local tribunal as may be established by an Act of Parliament, other than the currently established courts.

All Judges, including the Chief Justice and the Deputy Chief Justice, are selected by the Judicial Service Commission but are officially appointed by the President. However, the persons selected to be the Chief Justice and Deputy Chief Justice must first be vetted by Parliament before being appointed by the President. All other Judges do not need Parliamentary vetting and approval. Magistrates who preside over the subordinate courts are selected and appointed by the Judicial Service Commission without the involvement of the President or Parliament.

=== Elections and voting ===
Map of the Counties of Kenya

Elections in Kenya that predate 1992 were not multiparty elections. On independence, Kenya voted for Kenyatta as President. However, over the next few years Kenya slowly transitioned from being a democracy to being a one-party state. Kenyatta's regime greatly oversaw the gradual limitation of the democratic system. Kenyatta died in 1978; his vice President Moi took over and in 1982 the country was officially made a one-party state with every other party being outlawed. This was met by resistance over the next decade or so. In 1992 Kenya's first multiparty elections were held.

Ever since then elections have been held every 5 years. In 2013 the general election paved the way for semi-autonomy of the 47 counties of Kenya. Uhuru Kenyatta, the fourth president won and his coalition the Jubilee Alliance controlled the majority in both houses of Parliament, i.e. the National Assembly and the Senate.

The incumbent president William Ruto won the 2022 general elections and his coalition Kenya Kwanza now controls the majority in both houses of Parliament, i.e. the National Assembly and the Senate.

The state allows universal suffrage based on the aspiration for fair representation and equality. The only people not allowed to vote are people convicted of an election offence during the preceding five years. Elections in Kenya are overseen by the Independent Electoral and Boundaries Commission.

=== County governments ===
The Counties of Kenya have devolved functions of the former central government. Each county has its own Governor who is directly elected and thereafter becomes the highest elected official in the county. Each county has its own County Assembly with MCAs (Members of the County Assembly) as representatives.

The powers of the County are provided in Articles 191 and 192, and in the Fourth Schedule of the Constitution of Kenya and the County Governments Act of 2012.

Functions and duties not assigned by the Constitution automatically become the National governments responsibility.

As opposed to other devolved governments around the world, only the national government may impose income tax, value-added tax, customs duties and other duties on import and export goods and excise tax.

The counties are individually allowed to impose property rates, entertainment taxes and any other tax that it is authorised to impose by an Act of Parliament.

== See also ==
President

- The Cabinet
- The Judiciary
- The Supreme Court

Law

- The Constitution

Counties

- Counties
