= Kabando wa Kabando =

Kenyan politician

Kabando wa Kabando (born in 1969) is a Kenyan politician and activist. He represented the Mukurweini Constituency in the National Assembly of Kenya for two terms, having been elected for the first time in the 2007 Kenyan general election under the Safina Party, which he was member of until 2022. He is the founder Chairman of Nairobi Water Company (Kenya's biggest water supply company), and a founder of Students' Opinion (STOP) lobby which led to the revival of Students' Organisation of Nairobi University (SONU), where he was elected President in 1992. He is a regular author and media commentator on public affairs, locally and globally. In 2014, he was voted the most progressive public interest legislator in Kenyan Parliament.

== Education ==
Kabando attended the University of Nairobi and pursued Bachelor of Arts in Political Science in International Training in Corporate Governance and Leadership between 1990 and 1993. Later, he completed his Masters in Public Policy & Management at State University of New York, USA between 1999 and 2001. In 2008, he received a Distinguished Alumnus award from SUNYSB.

== Politics ==
Kabando was elected chairman of the Students Organization of Nairobi University (SONU) in 1992. Although at the time campus politics was highly tribal, Kabando was able to unite all ethnic groups together to vote for him. At around that time he changed his name to Kabando wa Kabando to conceal his ethnicity at the period since the then president was the Chancellor to the University and he was very interested in campus leadership.

Kabando served as the Chairman of Nairobi City Water Board from 2004 to 2007. He also doubled as the Chiefs Executive of Kenya Hotelkeepers Association 2003-7.

Kabando joined parliament in 2007. His first party, the Safina Party, was openly supporting the reelection of former president Mwai Kibaki in 2007. In 2013, Kabando joined The National Alliance party which was led by President Uhuru Kenyatta.

During the 2017 General Election in Kenya, Kabando contested the Jubilee Party's nomination to vie for the parliamentary seat in Mukurweini Constituency but he lost the bid and left the party to contest the parliamentary seat on an independent ticket but was again unsuccessful.

In 2022, Kabando ran unsuccessfully for the Nyeri county senator seat.
