= Embassy Property Purchase Scandal =

The Embassy Property Purchase Scandal is a scandal that resulted in the Kenyan Minister for Foreign Affairs Moses Wetangula leaving his post. Wetangula left his ministerial post on October 27, 2010, due to ongoing investigation on his alleged involvement in the Kenyan Tokyo embassy scandal.

It was alleged that instead of accepting free property from the government of Japan for the embassy, 1.6 billion shillings was withheld from the sale of Kenyan property in Nigeria and used to buy a less suitable property.

George Saitoti served as acting foreign minister during Wetangula's absence. Wetangula returned to the ministry in August 2011 after he was absolved from any wrongdoing by five separate probes, though he permanently left the position a few months later.

Later on 30th Wednesday 2016, Former Foreign Affairs permanent secretary Thuita Mwangi and two others were acquitted of all charges in relation to the Tokyo Embassy scam.

In making the ruling, a Nairobi court said the prosecution had failed to prove the case against the three.

The former PS had been charged alongside former ambassador to Libya Anthony Muchiri and former chargé d'affaires in Tokyo Allan Mburu.

They were charged with abuse of office in procuring the embassy and ambassador's residence in Tokyo at a price of Sh1.4 billion, and for failing to involve the ministerial tender committee in approving the purchase.

== See also ==
- Moses Wetangula
- National Cereals and Produce Board scandal
- National Youth Service scandal
- 2009 Triton Oil Scandal
- 2009 Kenyan Maize Scandal
- Corruption in Kenya
