= Chris Murungaru =

Kenyan politician

Christopher Ndarathi Mūrūngarū (born August 19, 1954, Nyeri, Kenya) is a former Kenyan politician, a former Member of Parliament for Kieni Constituency in Nyeri District and a former Minister of Transport.

Mūrūngarū was named Minister for Internal Security in 2003 after the National Rainbow Coalition(NARC) government took power from Kenya African National Union(KANU) upon their victory in the 2002 Kenya general elections . He was later transferred to the Ministry of Transport in a cabinet reshuffle following revelation of the Anglo-Leasing scandal, allegations he didn't expressly deny. When President Mwai Kibaki reconstituted the cabinet following a humiliating defeat in the November 21, 2005 Kenyan constitutional referendum, he was dropped from the cabinet. He was a close ally of Kenyan President Mwai Kibaki.

== Anglo Leasing Scandal ==
Mūrūngarū was embroiled in a conflict with the British Government following cancellation of his visa to enter the United Kingdom due to his involvement in the Anglo-Leasing scandal. He took the British Government to court challenging the cancellation of his visa after hiring Kenyan lawyer Paul Muite and a group of British lawyers, Mr. Rabinder Singh, a Queen's Counsel of Matrix Chambers, London, Mr. Richard Stein, a senior partner in Leigh, Day and Company and Ms. Tessa Hetherington, a junior counsel of Matrix, to represent him. Murungaru accused the then former British High Commissioner to Kenya, Edward Clay, of fostering his ban from the UK.

On November 23, 2005, President Mwai Kibaki of Kenya dissolved his cabinet following a humiliating defeat on a referendum on the proposed constitution of Kenya. The President and his key allies, including Mūrūngarū were campaigning for a 'Yes' vote on the constitution, which they lost, forcing the president to reconstitute his cabinet.

=== Fallout ===
On January 22, 2006, John Githongo named Mūrūngarū as one of three top politicians (along with Kiraitu Murungi, former Justice Minister and present Energy Minister, and Finance Minister David Mwiraria) as being involved in a financial scam involving up to US$600 million. On February 1, 2006, Finance Minister David Mwiraria announced that he was stepping down as a minister and a member of cabinet to pave way for investigation. The news was received with joy by many Kenyans, though some saw him as a scapegoat who had been sacrificed to protect a president whose support had been waning.

On January 16, 2006, President Kibaki allowed anti-corruption chief Aaron Ringera to request Mūrūngarū to declare and account for his wealth. Mūrūngarū moved to court to prevent the Kenya Anti-Corruption Commission from investigating, saying fulfilling the commission's request would amount to self-incrimination.

Vice President Moody Awori announced on February 2, 2006 that he would not step down despite being adversely mentioned in the Anglo-Leasing scandal. He insisted that he was innocent, and that nothing short of due process will make him resign his post. He has criticized by many for defending those involved in the scandal before Parliament.

== Legal battles ==
=== Refusal to disclose wealth ===
On February 17, 2006, the Kenya Anti-Corruption Commission (KACC) arraigned Mūrūngarū in a Nairobi court charging him with failing to declare and account for his wealth. The Commission believed that Mūrūngarū had become so rich too quickly and was keen to investigate the source of his wealth, especially in relation to the Anglo-Leasing scandal. He denied refusing to declare his wealth, and was released on a bond of KSh200,000.

On December 1, 2006, the Kenyan High Court determined that KACC's notice to Mūrūngarū was not carried out according to the laid down law which subsequently led to the High Court quashing KACC's case against Mūrūngarū. The High Court did not however stop KACC from investigating Mūrūngarū or anyone else for corruption but insisted that any orders issued by the commission be done so in a legal manner.

A society in Kenya under the banner of the Name and Shame Corruption Network (NASCON) held a demonstration in the streets of Nairobi to push for the resignation of more senior people in President Mwai Kibaki's administration. Those being called to resigned included civil service boss Francis Muthaura and vice president Moody Awori.

=== Defamation lawsuit against Githongo ===
In May 2022, the Court of Appeal in Kenya reduced the fine payable to Mūrūngarū by Githongo from KSh27 million (US$228,000) to KSh10 million (US$84,000). Mūrūngarū had successfully sued Githongo for leaking a dossier that implicated him [Mūrūngarū] in the Anglo Leasing scandal.

In an upset, Mūrūngarū was defeated by a comparatively obscure candidate in the Party of National Unity's primary elections for its parliamentary candidates in November 2007.

== See also ==
- Anglo-Leasing scandal
- David Mwiraria
- Francis Muthaura
- Kiraitu Murungi
- Mwai Kibaki
- Moody Awori
