= John Harun Mwau =

Former Assistant Minister For Transport in Kenya and businessman

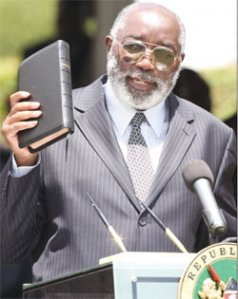

Assistant Minister for Transport
- In office 2008–2011
- President: Mwai Kibaki
- Prime Minister: Raila Odinga

Member of the Kenyan Parliament
- In office 2008–2012
- Preceded by: John Mutinda Mutiso
- Succeeded by: Regina Nthambi Muia
- Constituency: Kilome Constituency

1st Director of the Kenya Anti-Corruption Authority
- In office December 1997 – March 1999
- President: Daniel arap Moi
- Succeeded by: Aaron Ringera

Personal details
- Born: 24 June 1948 (age 77)
- Party: Party of Independent Candidates of Kenya
- Occupation: Businessman; Politician

John Harun Mwau (born 24 June 1948) is a Kenyan businessman, politician and former Assistant Minister for Transport in the Kibaki administration. He is the former Member of Parliament for Kilome Constituency.He was the first director of the defunct Kenya Anti-Corruption Authority but was removed after a year when a tribunal ruled that he was unfit to hold the office.

Harun Mwau is the founding chairman Party of Independent Candidates of Kenya (PICK) and ran as a Presidential Candidate in the 1992 Kenyan general election. Mwau polled 10,449 votes and later petitioned the High Court to declare him the only validly nominated candidate, as other candidates did not present the list of supporters nominating them using the correct paper size. The case was dismissed by the High Court.

Prior to his career as a politician, he was a sports shooter and competed at the 1968 Summer Olympics and the 1972 Summer Olympics.

== Controversy ==
=== Drug trafficking accusations ===
In 2011, the United States designated Harun Mwau, who was MP at the time, on a list of seven “narcotic kingpins”. Under this legislation, American assets are frozen, and access to the American financial system is denied. Harun Mwau has been cited as one of "the more powerful and active narcotics traffickers in the region" by the Director of the Office of Foreign Assets Control of the US Department of Treasury. Harun Mwau has been denying the charges and says that the United States government is attempting to unjustly seize his businesses, which are estimated to be worth $750 million.

=== Litigations ===
In 2005, Harun Mwau sued the Nation Media group for an alleged defamatory article which implicated him in a tax evasion scandal. The same year, he filed four suits against the senior executives and editors of Kenya's leading media houses to permanently bar the media from publishing reports linking him to drug trafficking. In 2011, Harun Mwau sued the United States Ambassador Michael Ranneberger for associating him to narcotic drug trafficking. In 2013, he sued a student over a Facebook post linking him to the murder of Internal Security minister, George Saitoti. In 2014, he sued the author of a report from the International Peace Institute, where his designation by the US government as a foreign narcotics kingpin was mentioned. In January 2015, a Nairobi high court rejected Mwau's legal bid to compel former president Uhuru Kenyatta to confer Mwau state honors for his service as Kilome Mp between 2008 and 2012. In 2017, he sued the authors of two blog posts which link him to a businessman believed to be close to Colombia's drug cartels. The same year, he sued the Kenyan Independent Electoral and Boundaries Commission for "intending to conduct a fresh presidential election without nominations". In June 2017, a Malindi court ordered Mwau to be compensated for a botched real estate agreement for luxury apartment purchases following contract breaches by Kilifi based property developers. In August 2023,a Nairobi high court ordered Kenya Police to compensate Mwau for illegally detaining his vehicle for over 6 years and in the process violated his property rights.

== 2013 election ==
Mwau vied for senatorial position for Makueni in 2013 Election. He was defeated by Mutula Kilonzo

Candidate	Party	Vote
Kiki Mulwa	NARC	2,668
Harun MWau	PICK	51,162
Mutula Kilonzo	Wiper	193,539
Muthoka Katumo	Independent	2,459
Rejected		1,544
Vote Cast		251,363

=== 2013 Makueni by-election ===
Mutula Kilonzo Jnr a son of former senator Mutula Kilonzo of Wiper Democratic Party won 163,232 votes to win the Makueni Senate seat in the 2013 by-election. Mwau therefore has lost senatorial election to father and son in a span of 5 month.

Cadindate	Party	Votes
Mutula Kilonzo Jnr	Wiper	163,232
John H. Mwau	PICK	6,431
Philip Kaloki	NARC	9,762
Katumo Urbanus	Independent	517
Kitundu Jane	Labour	387
Rejected		
Total Cast		180,329

Makueni by-election, the first after the 4 March 2013 general election, was occasioned by the death of Mutula Kilonzo on 27 April 2013. The voter turnout was 60.4%.

== See also ==
- Corruption in Kenya
- Kenya Anti-Corruption Authority
- Kenya Anti-Corruption Commission
- Ethics and Anti-Corruption Commission
