= Philip Murgor =

Kenyan lawyer

Philip Kipchirchir Murgor is a Kenyan lawyer.

== Early life and education ==
Philip Kipchirchir Murgor was born on the 4th of July 1961 at Iten District Hospital to Christine Chebor, a nurse, in Elgeyo-Marakwet District (now Elgeyo-Marakwet County), Kenya. His father, Charles Murgor, was employed by the colonial administration as a District Officer.

Murgor spent his formative school years in Kiambu town, Central Province, and Kisumu town, Nyanza Province. His father Charles retired as a Provincial Commissioner in 1969 and the family moved to Eldoret in present-day Uasin Gishu County.

=== Education ===
In 1981, he joined the University of Nairobi for his undergraduate Bachelor of Laws (LLB) degree. Upon graduation in 1985, he joined the Kenya School of Law for his post-graduate Diploma in Law while undertaking his pupillage at Hamilton Harrison and Matthews.

=== Coup D'état ===
During the abortive coup d'état by the Kenya Air Force in 1982, Murgor and a couple of his classmates were arrested and charged with being sympathetic to the coup and demonstrating seditious intentions. Murgor and his classmates were incarcerated to await trial under the authority of the then Attorney General of Kenya Joseph Kamere. He spent several months imprisoned before the incoming Attorney-General Matthew Guy-Muli, who served as the Attorney General of Kenya between 1983 and 1991, dropped all charges against Philip and his classmates due to lack of evidence.

=== Kenya School of Law ===
Murgor went on to finalize his Bachelor of Laws with honors and thereafter, his postgraduate diploma program at the Kenya School of Law. While at the School of Law in 1986, he was selected, among seven others, to participate in an American student exchange program. During this period he had the opportunity to intern at the Superior Court of the United States in Washington DC.

In 2008, he returned to his alma mater University of Nairobi for his Master of Laws (LLM) in International Trade and Investments Law for which he graduated with honors in 2011.

== Early career ==
As a law student, Murgor interned at Mereka & Company which specialized in insurance law. Thereafter, he joined Hamilton Harrison and Matthews, one of the oldest law firms with a strong commercial civil litigation practice. After completing his studies, in 1986 he took a position as State Counsel in the Public Prosecutions Department, where he was posted to the Kisumu Provincial State Counsel Office. As a criminal prosecutor, he was responsible for advising and directing the criminal investigators on the adequacy or direction of their investigations to ensure successful prosecutions.

Public Prosecutor of Kenya Bernard Chunga transferred Murgor back to Nairobi in 1992

=== President Daniel arap Moi Election Petition Case ===
In 1992 Murgor resigned from the civil service and joined his wife in private practice at Murgor and Murgor Advocates. He was appointed to the legal team that defended President Daniel arap Moi in election petitions filed after the first multiparty general elections in 1992.

=== Goldenberg Scandal ===
In 1995, he was appointed by the Central Bank of Kenya to unravel the Goldenberg scandal and recover the billions lost in the scam. His successful handling of the scandal cases on behalf of the Central Bank of Kenya against Kamlesh Pattni and his associates led to direct threats to his life, which forced him to go public on the same. Thereafter, he was denied his legal fees in an attempt to force him to compromise the cases. He was eventually forced to quit the cases in 1998, rather than succumb to the threats.

When Mwai Kibaki became President in 2003 on an anti-corruption platform, the president immediately re-appointed him to the Goldenberg scandal cases, and a month later he was appointed as the Public Prosecutor, a post he reluctantly accepted on condition that he would be granted a free hand in reforming the failed public prosecution services, and prosecution perpetrators of grand corruption. By 2004, the Kibaki government had fallen back on its anti-corruption pledges, and many of officials had slipped into corruption the most significant of which was the Anglo-Leasing Scandal and trafficking of cocaine.

=== Anglo-Leasing Scandal ===
Murgor faced resistance in relation to the prosecution of Anglo-Leasing Scandal and a thorough investigation into a case involving the trafficking of 1.2 tonnes of cocaine worth KShs 6.4 billion. The cases were thwarted by Presidential insiders. The correlation between the prosecution and threats to his person was heightened when his home was attacked. He was terminated as Public Prosecutor in May 2005.

== Private Practice Career ==
Murgor returned to private practice as a Litigation Partner at Murgor and Murgor Advocates. In 2007, he took over as the Managing Partner at the Firm when his wife was appointed as Group Counsel and company secretary for East African Breweries Limited (EABL). In 2008, he represented the Central Bank of Kenya in the Grand Regency Scandal on the sale of the Grand Regency Hotel. In 2011, he became the 10th Kenyan Lawyer and the 568th in the world to be admitted as a legal practitioner at the International Criminal Court.

Murgor has since handled several landmark cases touching on the enforcement of fundamental rights under the new constitution relating to gender rights. Recently, he sued the directors and shareholders of Imperial Bank Limited on behalf of the Kenya Deposit Insurance Corporation to recover KShs.45 Billion of customer deposits lost due their negligence and breach of fiduciary duties.

Murgor supports civil society initiatives and forums that are concerned about the growing ethnic tensions and runaway corruption, both of which threaten the very existence of Kenya. He is an advocate for the rights of the disadvantaged members of society. He holds memberships in various prestigious legal and civil society groups.

== Philanthropy ==
In 2014, Murgor was appointed as the Chairman of Wildlife Direct Kenya (WLD). He was part of the team that initiated the Hands Off Our Elephants Campaign to help save our endangered animals from poachers. In April 2016, in partnership with the Kenya Wildlife Service and the Government of Kenya, he helped make history by participating in the destruction of 105 tonnes of ivory

== Personal life ==
Murgor met his wife, Justice Agnes K. Murgor, in 1986 during their time in the exchange program in Washington, D.C. They were married in 1990 and have three children. They own a 650-acre dairy project .
