= National Cereals and Produce Board scandals =

Corruption scandals in Kenya

The National Cereals and Produce Board scandals were a series of scandals associated with Kenya's state-owned entity NCPB, which is mandated to manage the storage of cereals and agricultural produce in the country and sell of the produce to local consumers and millers. The most renowned NCPB scandals happened in the late 2000s and the most recent scandals happened in 2018 and 2024, spanning nearly two decades.

== 2000s scandal ==
The 2009 scandal revealed that millers existing only on paper were awarded large quantities of maize after thousands of tonnes of maize were imported to supplement the local produce after an acute maize shortage and were to be sold to local millers. Genuine millers were sidelined from accessing import quotas with key people in government implicated in the scandal. William Ruto was the then Minister for Agriculture.

== Recent scandals ==
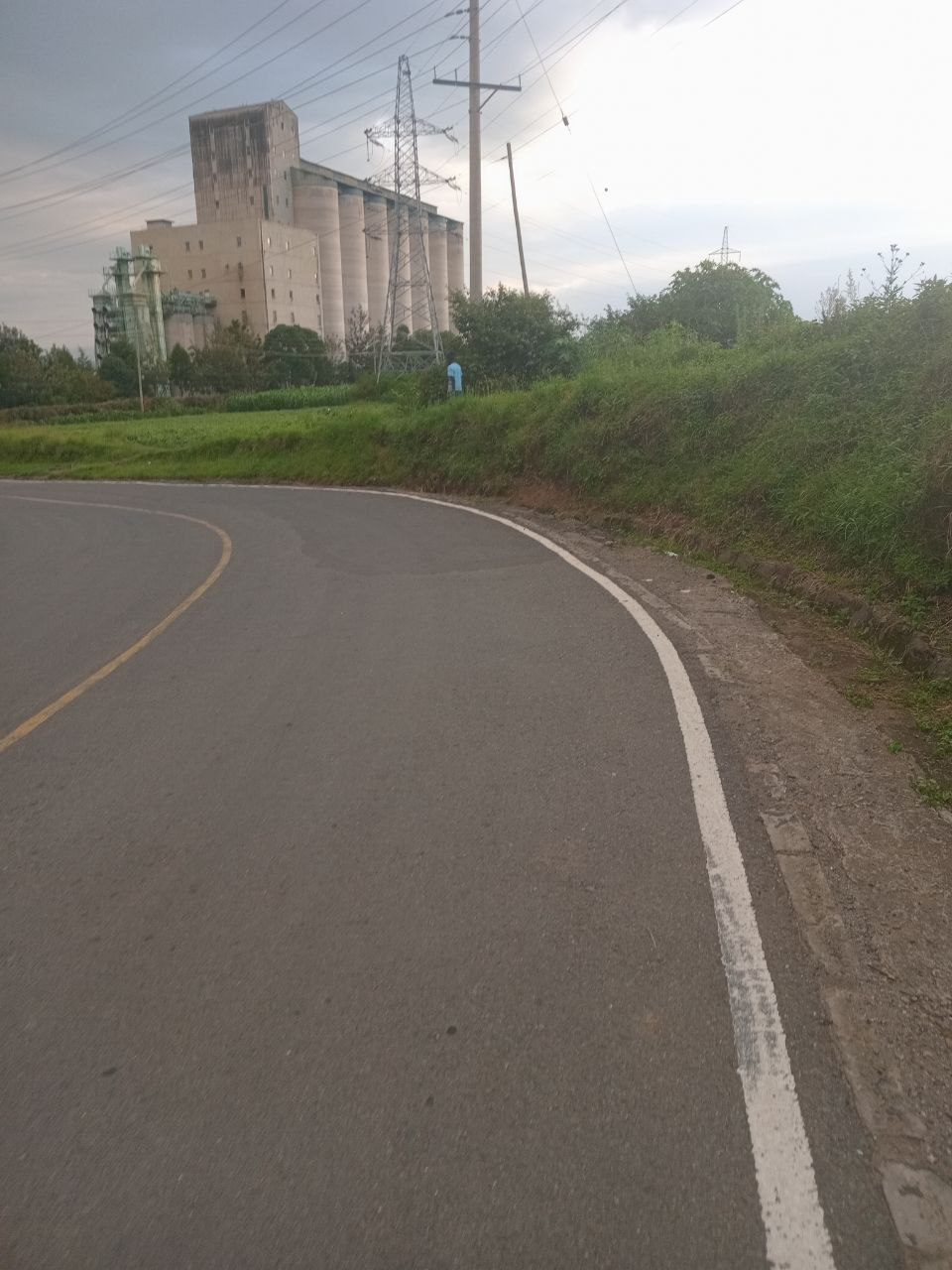
Nakuru NCPB stores

=== 2018 scandal ===
In 2018 eleven suspects including Renson Kibet Korir (Silo Manager, Eldoret), Willy Kipkoech Kosgei (Silo Manager, Kisumu), Jeremiah Omutsani Omwayi (Deputy Silo Manager, Kisumu), Laban Momanyi Michira (Cashier, NCPB Kisumu) and Thomas Kipkurgat Sang (Extension Officer, Soi Ward) were arrested and charged with economic crimes and breach of law in a scandal where KES100million was lost by the cereals board. The same year it was reported that NCPB lost Ksh.1.6 billion shillings over irregular purchase of maize..

== 2019 scandal ==
In 2019 in yet another maize scandal, it emerged that NCPB had paid Ksh768.3 million to unscrupulous traders across the country for maize supplies which were never delivered while others were inflated. Legitimate farmers who had supplied their maize to the NCPB depots were yet to receive their payments. The then NCPB Managing Director Newton Terer resigned, Mwangi Kiunjuri had been appointed CS Agriculture at that time and was reported to be on a major house-cleaning in his portfolio. Five top managers including the Eldoret and Kisumu depot managers were suspended and 59 other officials put under investigation in the purge

=== Fake fertilizer scandal ===
In 2024, KES209million was reportedly lost in a fertilizer scandal. The then NCPB managing director Joseph Muna Kimote, corporate secretary John Kiplangat Ngetich, and general marketing manager John Mbaya Matiri were arrested and prosecuted by the Directorate of Public Prosecutions. They were accused that jointly with others, they conspired with intent to defraud Kenyan farmers, sold a total of 139,688 bags of 25 Kgs each of soil amendment and conditioner valued at Sh209,532,000 purporting it to be a genuine fertilizer a fact they knew to be false. Kimote was later suspended.. In the scandal, farmers were sold fake fertilizer which was mixed with sand and donkey poop by NCPB stores. The Law Society of Kenya threatened to take legal action against the then Agriculture cabinet secretary Mithika Linturi, who was at the center of scandal. Subsequently, an impeachment against him was filed to the National Assembly. The government promised to compensate farmers who had bought the fake fertilizer. No one has since been convicted. In October 2025 Kimote was acquitted of the graft charges by Milimani high court for lack of evidence. The ruling was made by Chief magistrate Celesas Asis Okore .

In 2025, Kenya's auditor general revealed irregularities in the procurement and distribution of fertilizer worth KSh31.5 billion. Payments worth billions of Kenya shillings were made to non-existent companies and suppliers during procurement by NCPB.

It also emerged that NCPB paid KSh139.6 million to a chemical company for the supply of NPK fertiliser under the Fertiliser Subsidy Programme. KEBS later flagged the product as substandard and unsuitable for planting. Despite this, it still found its way to the market and was sold to farmers.

== See also ==
- 2009 Kenyan Maize Scandal
- 2009 Triton Oil Scandal
- Anglo-Leasing scandal
- Corruption in Kenya
- Grand Regency Scandal
- Goldenberg Scandal
