= Corruption in Kenya =

Corruption in Kenya has a history that spans the era of the founding president Jomo Kenyatta, to Daniel arap Moi's KANU, Mwai Kibaki's PNU governments. President Uhuru Kenyatta's Jubilee Party government, and the current William Ruto's Kenya Kwanza administration have also been riddled with massive cases of graft, topping in the list of corrupt presidents in Africa.

In Transparency International's 2025 Corruption Perceptions Index, Kenya scored 30 on a scale from 0 ("highly corrupt") to 100 ("very clean"). When ranked by score, Kenya ranked 130th among the 182 countries in the Index, where the country ranked first is perceived to have the most honest public sector. For comparison with regional scores, the best score among sub-Saharan African countries (Note: Angola, Benin, Botswana, Burkina Faso, Burundi, Cameroon, Cape Verde, Central African Republic, Chad, Comoros, Côte d'Ivoire, Democratic Republic of the Congo, Djibouti, Equatorial Guinea, Eritrea, Eswatini, Ethiopia, Gabon, Gambia, Ghana, Guinea, Guinea-Bissau, Kenya, Lesotho, Liberia, Madagascar, Malawi, Mali, Mauritania, Mauritius, Mozambique, Namibia, Niger, Nigeria, Republic of the Congo, Rwanda, Sao Tome and Principe, Senegal, Seychelles, Sierra Leone, Somalia, South Africa, South Sudan, Sudan, Tanzania, Togo, Uganda, Zambia, and Zimbabwe.) was 68, the average was 32 and the worst was 9. For comparison with worldwide scores, the best score was 89 (ranked 1), the average was 42, and the worst was 9 (ranked 181, in a two-way tie).

Most bribes paid by urban residents in Kenya are fairly small but large ones are also taken – bribes worth over KSh.50,000/= (€297.59, US$324.89) account for 41% of the total value. There is also corruption on a larger scale with each of the last two regimes being criticised for their involvement.

Despite market reforms, several business surveys reveal that business corruption is still widespread and that companies frequently encounter demands for bribes and informal payments to 'get things done' in Kenya, a trend that has contributed to an increased cost of doing business in Kenya. The country ranks 56 among 190 economies globally on the World Bank's Ease of Doing Business Index 2019.

The public procurement sector in Kenya suffers widespread corruption and is the leading form of graft in the public service and is always at the centre of all major corruption scandals. The use of agents to facilitate business operations and transactions in Kenya is widespread and poses a risk for companies, particularly at the market entry and business start-up stage.

Despite positive developments, the Kenya Anti-Corruption Commission (KACC) was disbanded and replaced by the newly instated Ethics and Anti-Corruption Commission (EACC) on 5 September 2011. Observers describe the new agency as superficial.

It is observed that in Kenya bribery and nepotism as the most prevalent forms of corruption according to surveys carried out.

On 22 July 2019, Kenya's finance minister Henry Rotich became the country's first sitting minister to be arrested for corruption. This followed an order by the director of public prosecution (DPP), Noordin Haji, for the arrest and prosecution of Mr. Rotich and his principal secretary (PS) Kamau Thugge among other top government officials over the multibillion-shilling Arror and Kimwarer dams scandal.

In 2017, the US government cut health funding to Kenya over widespread corruption in the Ministry of Health. USAID suspended $21M funding for activities carried out by a number of the Ministry's departments over corruption and weak accounting procedures.

== Before 1990 ==
- The first corruption incident in Kenya is widely regarded as the Ngei maize scandal of 1965. Paul Ngei, an independence hero and at the time the minister for marketing and cooperatives, was involved in a maize scandal that caused a national maize shortage. The Commission of Maize Inquiry, the first of its kind in independent Kenya, found that Ngei's wife, Emma, was getting preferential treatment for her business, Emma Stores (Uhuru Millers of Kangundo), through which she bought maize directly from farmers, which was illegal at the time.
- Between 1986 and 1991 the construction of the Turkwel Hydroelectric Power Station was riddled with claims of corruption. The dam was eventually built at three times the estimated cost, twice the allocated amount and producing energy significantly below capacity.

=== Turkwel Dam Scandal ===
The Turkwel Gorge Hydro Electric Dam Project was commissioned in 1986 and completed by French company Spie Batignolles in 1991. The construction of the dam is one of the controversial projects that characterized former president Moi's administration in the late 80s and early 90s. According to media reports the project was riddled by allegations over pricing, lack of environmental assessment and feasibility study, and failure to have an open tendering process that saw the contract awarded to the French company.

In 1986, Achim Kratz, then European Commission delegate to Kenya, in an internal memo that was leaked to the Financial Times alleged that Kenya's failure to have an open tendering process resulted in the government paying more than double the cost.

The blame on alleged corruption surrounding the dam was blamed on two government officials: then Minister of Energy Nicholas Biwott and then Finance Minister George Saitoti who were accused of handpicking the French company for the job for their own gain in terms of kickbacks.

In 2000, the permanent secretary, secretary to the cabinet, and head of Public Service to the Kenyan government, Dr. Richard Leakey declassified the Turkwel dam files making them publicly accessible. The information, which falsified the graft allegations raised against the project including the lack of an open tendering process, was also made public in Hansard, parliamentary debates of June 8, 2000.

The late president Moi had appointed Dr. Leakey in 1999 to head the civil service and help reform the corrupt civil service and privatization of state-owned companies but Leakey stepped down in 2001.

In March 2002 in High Court Case No. 2143 of 1999, Nicholas Biwott successfully sued the People's Daily Newspaper over libel after the paper published a story accusing him of colluding with the French firm to award it the contract in disregard of due process. Justice Aluoch awarded him 10M KSh in damages.

== 1990–1999 ==
- The longest-running scandal is the Goldenberg scandal, where the Kenyan government subsidized exports of gold, paying exporters in Kenyan shillings (KSh.) 35% over their foreign currency earnings. In this case, the gold was smuggled from Congo. The Goldenberg scandal cost Kenya the equivalent of more than 10% of the country's annual GDP.
- A KSh.360 million/= helicopter servicing contract in South Africa. Military officers had argued that the contract was too extravagant and servicing the helicopters could be done locally. Kenya Air Force (KAF) went ahead to spend KSh.108 million/= as a down payment for servicing the Puma helicopters, whose tail number is logged as 418 at Denel Aviation, a South African firm.

== 2000–2009 ==
"In 2003, because of the corruption and misuse of the arms under their custody, 600 KPRs (Kenya Police Reserves) were disarmed in Tana River, and in most urban areas of Kenya, they were disbanded as of 18 April 2004. Among the reasons given was that officers had become a threat to national security instead of defending it. In some areas, the officers commanding police divisions did not know the number of men they had, even though they were issued with firearms, ammunition and walkie-talkies."

- In 2003, the military was split over plans to buy new Czech fighter jets. The plan to buy the jet fighters would have cost taxpayers KSh.12.3 billion/=.
- A KSh.4.1 billion/= Navy ship deal. A Navy project was given to Euromarine, a company associated with Anura Pereira, the tender was awarded in a process that has been criticised as irregular. The tender was worth KSh.4.1 billion/=. Military analysts say a similar vessel could have been built for KSh.1.8 billion/=.
- Chamanlal Kamani had been involved in a supply contract, with Kamsons Motors. Kampsons tendered for the supply of Mahindra Jeeps to the Police Department in the mid-1990s for close to KSh.1 million/= (US$13,000) each, at a time when showrooms would have charged customers a sixth of the price. Moreover, the vehicles were being bought for a government department and were therefore imported duty-free. Few of the more than 1,000 units that were imported over several years are in service today.
- The Kamanis were also involved in a deal to build a CID forensic laboratory. On 7 June 2004 an amount of $4.7 million was wired back. The payment was a refund against the money paid for the Criminal Investigations Department forensic laboratory. Another €5.2 million was paid back in respect of the E-cop project, which involved computerisation of the police force and the installation of spy cameras in Nairobi by Infotalent Systems Private Limited.
- The Prisons department lost $3 million after contracting Hallmark International, a company associated with Deepak Kamani of Kamsons Motors, for the supply of 30 boilers. Only half of the boilers were delivered – from India and not the United States as had been agreed.
- The construction of Nexus, a secret military communication centre in Karen, Nairobi. The Government spent KSh.2.6 billion/= (US$36.9 million) to construct the complex. Three years later, military personnel have not moved into the centre. A phantom company, Nedermar BV Technologies, which is said to have its headquarters in the Netherlands, implemented the secret project situated along Karen South Road. Nedermar is linked to businessman Anura Pereira. However, Pereira has denied this. The tendering process for the Nexus project was circumvented by DoD's Departmental Tender Committee. Funding for the project was made through the Ministry of Transport and Communications. The complex is currently headed by Colonel Philip Kameru. Nexus was first meant to be an ammunition dumpsite before it was turned into a military communication and operations centre. Construction continued without any site visits by either the DoD staff or Ministry of Public Works officials. The Nexus project was implemented during the tenure of General Joseph Kibwana.
- In 2005 plans to buy a sophisticated £20 million stg. passport equipment system from France, as the government wanted to replace its passport printing system, created conditions for a corruption scandal. The transaction was originally quoted at 6 million euros from François Charles Oberthur of Paris (a supplier of Visa and MasterCards) but was awarded to a British firm, the Anglo-Leasing and Finance Company Limited, at 30 million euros, who would have sub-contracted the same French firm to do the work. Despite the lack of competitive tendering Anglo Leasing was paid a "commitment fee" of more than £600,000 stg. Anglo Leasing's agent is a Liverpool-based firm, Saagar Associates, owned by a woman whose family has enjoyed close links with senior officials in the Moi regime. Company records show Saagar Associates is owned by Sudha Ruparell. Ruparell is the daughter of Chamanlal Kamani, the multimillionaire patriarch of a business family that enjoyed close links with senior officials in the Moi regime. Anglo Leasing made a repayment of €956,700 through a telegraphic transfer from Schroeder & Co Bank AG, Switzerland on 17 May 2004.
- The local chapter of Transparency International and the Kenya National Commission on Human Rights (KNCHR), a government body released a report in February 2006, stating that between January 2003 and September 2004, the National Rainbow Coalition government spent about US$12 million on cars that were mostly for the personal use of senior government officials. The vehicles included 57 Mercedes-Benz, as well as Land Cruisers, Mitsubishi Pajeros, Range Rovers, Nissan Terranos and Nissan Patrols. The US$12 million substantially exceeded what the government spent over the 2003/04 financial year on controlling malaria – "the leading cause of morbidity and mortality in Kenya", says the report.
- In late February 2006, the newspaper The Standard ran a story claiming that the president Mwai Kibaki and senior opposition figure Kalonzo Musyoka had been holding secret meetings. On 2 March at 1:00 am local time (2200 UTC on the 1st), masked gunmen carrying AK-47s raided multiple editorial offices of The Standard, and of its television station KTN. They kicked and beat staff members, forcibly took computers and transmission equipment, burned all the copies of the 2 March edition of the newspaper, and damaged the presses. At KTN, they shut down the power, putting the station off the air. Initially, the Kenyan information minister claimed no knowledge of the raid, but it has since revealed that Kenyan police were responsible. The Ministry of Internal Security later stated that the incident was to safeguard state security. "If you rattle a snake you must be prepared to be bitten by it," John Michuki said. Three journalists at The Standard, arrested after the critical story was printed, are still being held without charge. The story also featured the bizarre case of two Armenian businessmen, Artur Margaryan and Artur Sargasyan, mocked in the press for their taste for heavy gold chains, watches and rings, referred to as Mercenaries, who the opposition said they led the raid and had shady dealings with Kibaki's government. Raila Odinga referred to them as mamluki (Swahili word for mercenaries), implicating Kibaki of having been involved with the brothers.
- In November 2006, the government was accused of failing to act on a banking fraud scam worth $1.5bn involving money laundering and tax evasion, reported by whistle-blowers as early as 2004. Investigators believe sums worth 10% of Kenya's national income are involved. An auditor's report said the scale of the operations "threatens the stability of the Kenyan economy".
- In November 2006, British Foreign Office minister Kim Howells warned, that corruption in Kenya is increasing the UK's exposure to drug trafficking and terrorism. "People can be bought, right from the person who works at the docks in Mombasa up to the government. (...) This weakness has been recognised by drug traffickers and probably by terrorists too." Said Howells for the BBC.
- On 31 August 2007, The Guardian newspaper featured on its front page a story about more than £1 billion stg. transferred out of Kenya by the family and associates of former Kenyan leader Daniel arap Moi. The Guardian sourced the information from the WikiLeaks article The looting of Kenya under President Moi and its analysis of a leaked investigative document ("the Kroll report") prepared for the Kibaki government in 2004 to try to recover money stolen during Moi's rule.
- On November 6, 2009 parliament passed the Statute Law (Miscellaneous Amendments) Bill, restricting investigations by the Kenya Anti-Corruption Commission to offences committed prior to May 2003, excluding the Goldenberg and Anglo-Leasing scandals and other major cases. The move was condemned by anti-corruption campaigners. Mwalimu Mati, former chief executive of the Transparency International Kenya Chapter, declared that "grand corruption has swallowed the government and parliament that Kenyans elected to fight it in 2002". In response to public outrage generated by the move, President Kibaki announced that he would veto the bill.
- In September 2007, WikiLeaks released documents exposing a KSh.500 million payroll fraud at Egerton University] and subsequent cover-up. The subject of ongoing legal dispute in the High Court.
- In June 2008, the Grand Regency Scandal broke, wherein the Central Bank of Kenya is alleged to have secretly sold a luxury hotel in Nairobi to an unidentified group of Libyan investors for more than KSh.4 billion (approx US$60 million) below the appraised market value. Finance Minister Amos Kimunya negotiated the sale, and was censured in a near-unanimous motion by the Kenyan Parliament, though he vehemently denies the charges. This follows on the heels of the Safaricom IPO, overseen by Kimunya, which has been alternatively praised and questioned for possible corruption in the execution of the sale. Safaricom is the largest mobile phone service provider in Kenya, having operated with a near-government monopoly for many years. The government of Kenya sold its 50% stake in Safaricom in the IPO.
- In January 2009, a scandal became public over the sale of imported maize.
- The 2009 Triton Oil Scandal regarding the unauthorised releasing of oil by Kenya Pipeline Company (KPC) without informing financiers became public in January 2009.

== 2010–present ==
- In October 2012, allegations surfaced that top Foreign Affairs Ministry officials ignored land offered by Japan that could have saved the country loss of KSh.1.1 billion. The scandal led to the resignation of the then Foreign Affairs Minister Moses Wetangula.
- In October 2010, the Department of Defence uncovered a bribery scandal involving senior Kenya Defence Force Officers in the corrupt KSh.1.6 billion purchase of armoured personnel carriers from South African company OTT Technologies (Pty) Ltd. Minister of Defence Mohamed Yusuf Haji retired several high-ranking officers in January 2011 accused of taking bribes by OTT Technologies (Pty) Ltd, and the matter was referred for further investigation to Parliament. The September 2012 Report on Military Modernization Programmes by the Departmental Committee on Defence and Foreign Relations found that the irregular procurement of the PUMA M26 armoured carriers had violated multiple sections of the Public Procurement Act 2005, that OTT Technologies (Pty) Ltd's business partners in Kenya had been identified by the US Government as being involved in international crime and drugs smuggling, and recommended that OTT Technologies (Pty) Ltd be barred from doing any business with the Government of Kenya in the future. In 2014, the same company was accused by the government of Mozambique of irregular tax and export control activities in the transport of similar armoured carriers through Mozambique for onward trafficking into Africa.
- Mega corruption scandals hit Kenya in 2018. The country lost over KSh.13 billion/= to graft deals in key state departments such as the National Youth Service, Kenya Pipeline Company, National Cereals and Produce Board, National Health Insurance Fund (NHIF) and shoddy land transactions at the Ministry of Lands. Mohammed Abdalla Swazuri, the chairman of National Land Commission, and Atanas Kariuki Maina, managing director of the Kenya Railways Corporation, were among 18 officials, businesspeople and companies arrested on corruption charges involving land allocation for the $3 billion flagship Nairobi-Mombasa railway.
- In February 2019, The Ministry of Lands headed by lands CS Farida Karoney, could not account for the loss of KSh.20 billion/= worth of taxpayer's money. The details regarding this saga was delivered by the country's auditor general Edward Ouko. This report indicated a lot of discrepancies and inaccuracies in the ministry's 30 June 2018 financial Statement.
- In July 2019, the director of public prosecution, Noordin Haji uncovered a mega-graft scandal on the procurement of two dams. The graft case led to the Kenyan public purge losing KSh.19 billion. The scandal involved high-profile people in the government such as the then CS of treasury Henry Rotich and 28 others. Rotich, his principal secretary, the chief executive of Kenya's environmental authority and other 28 accused handed themselves into police custody after being criminally charged with corruption. The allocated budget of Sh19,714,366,991 that was lost through graft was meant to construct 2 dams, Arwor and Kimwarer Dams in Elgeyo Marakwet County.
- On 6 December 2019, Nairobi Governor Mike Mbuvi Sonko was arrested on multiple corruption charges On 11 August 2020, Nairobi County Assembly Speaker Beatrice Elachi resigned. On 21 December 2020, recently elected Nairobi County Assembly Speaker Benson Mutura was sworn in as acting Nairobi Governor four days after Sonko was impeached and removed from office. At the time of Mutura's swearing in as acting governor, a position which he would constitutionally hold for at least 60 days, Nairobi did not have a deputy governor as well.
- On 14 January 2020, Kenyatta officially replaced Rotich with Labour Secretary Ukur Yatani
- On 9 December 2020, it was confirmed by the Kenya News Agency that the National Anti-Corruption Campaign Steering Committee (NACCSC) was in the process of strengthening its collaboration with other crime fighting agencies, including those in Kenyatta's government. The group had National Government Administrative Officers (NGAO) in hopes they would support the County Anti-Corruption Civil Oversight Committee (CACCOC). The day before, Winnie Guchu, who served in Kenyatta's government as the Chief Administrative Secretary (CAS) in the office of the attorney general and the Department of Justice, confirmed in a press conference that she had met with members of CACCOC to strengthen relations.
- On 11 December 2020, Kenya's Ethics and Anti-Corruption Commission (EACC) released a statement confirming that Robert Pavel Oimeke, the director general of Kenya's Energy and Petroleum Regulatory Authority, was arrested and taken into police custody on charges of demanding KSh.200,000/= ($1,795) to approve the re-opening of a petrol station that had been shut down over violations.

== COVID-19 funds ==
In August 2020, Activists in Kenya embarked on countrywide protests to demand full accountability of all the COVID-19 funds from the government, following media reports of misappropriation of the funds. Narc party leader and human rights defender, Martha Karua, was the first leader to come out publicly call on the President Kenyatta's government to provide full disclosure and accountability of the Covid-19 funds and equipment from all sources including loans, grants, donations and in-kind support both locally and internationally.

== KEMSA scandal ==
The Ethics and Anti-Corruption Commission has been investigating an alleged procurement scandal at the Kenya Medical Supplies Authority (KEMSA), which is the state organ tasked with the procurement and supply of medical equipment and drugs. The country lost close to KES8billion in the scandal. Jonah Manjari, the then CEO Jonah Manjari and procurement officer Charles Juma among other officials were suspended and charged in court over the scandal, which rocked the nation at the height of covid-19 pandemic. Manjari and others were accused of illegally diverting money meant for purchase of medical ewuipment including PPEs and also procurement fraud where PPEs were bought at an inflated price of over 3 times the actual market price. Manjari was suspended and has not yet been convicted as the case is still ongoing.

== Arror and Kimwarer Dams Scandals ==
The Arror and Kimwarer dams scandals is one of the major corruption sagas that characterised former president Uhuru Kenyatta and his deputy William Ruto's (now president) government. At the center of the once ambitious project that turned out to a major graft scandal is an Italian firm; CMC di Ravenna and 28 government officials that included former treasury cabinet secretary Henry Rotich and his principal secretary Kamau Thugge, who has recently been nominated by the president as Governor of the Central Bank of Kenya.

The Italian construction company failed to construct the Arror and Kimwarer dams despite being paid billions of shillings.

President William Ruto in March 2023 announced plans to revive the project following discussions with Italian president Sergio Mattarella, who was on an official tour in Kenya.

== SHA scandal ==
Kenya lost billions of shillings in a scandal involving insurance fraud and financial crime.

== Anti-Corruption Initiatives ==
Despite corruption being rampant in Kenya, the country has had an anti-corruption legislation dating back to 1956; The Prevention of Corruption Act (Cap. 65), which was in operation from August 1956 to May 2003 when the Anti-Corruption and Economic Crimes Act, No. 3, became operational.

The Ethics and Anti-Corruption Commission has also provided a framework for reporting cases of graft in the Government and the public Sector. The reports can be reported in person, via phone call or email at the EACC headquarters or any of the commission's regional offices across the counties or at the Huduma Centre. Whistleblowers can also file reports anonymously.

Since 2003, EACC has secured 293 convictions in Court and recovered assets worth KSh.26.65 billion/=, acquired from corruption.

=== Wealth Declaration for Civil Servants ===
In an effort to curb corruption and promote ethics and integrity in the public service, all senior civil servants in Kenya are required to declare their wealth. The wealth declaration for public officials is backed by The Public Officer Ethics Act, 2003, which sets out one-year jail term or one million fine for those who fail to submit a declaration or clarification.

The declarations are meant to detect and prevent corrupt practices, evaluate potential conflicts of interest, promote transparency and accountability and increase public confidence in government. The wealth declaration forms have helped EACC nab corrupt public officers especially in the graft-ridden police service.

In 2015 President Uhuru Kenyatta, in a bold move to tame the massive corruption that has tainted his first term in office, asked all public officials, who had adversely been named in a graft report handed to him by the EACC, to step aside and pave way for investigations. The officials named in the report consisted of members of the Public Accounts Committee in Parliament, MPs, heads of parastatals and various principal secretaries. Then Lands cabinet secretary Charity Ngilu was among the leaders mentioned in the report, who stepped down following President Kenyatta's directive. Secretary to the Cabinet Francis Kimemia, Labour minister Kazungu Kambi, Transport and infrastructure CS Eng Michael Kamau, Transport PS Nduva Muli and Energy and Petroleum CS Davis Chirchir also resigned.

==== Office of the Director of Public Prosecutions (ODPP) ====
The office of the director of public prosecutions, whose core functions include prosecution of those charged by the police and other investigative agencies with criminal offences, has also helped in the war against graft. The current DPP Noordin Haji has particularly introduced a new vigour in the fight against corruption since he assumed the office in 2018.

Senior government officials including sitting ministers, governors, principal secretaries and MPs, linked to corruption scandals, have been arrested and prosecuted on the DPP's orders.

Some of the governors who have been charged with misappropriation of public funds include; Migori governor Zachary Okoth Obado, Nairobi governor Mike Sonko, Kiambu governor Ferdinard Waititu, Samburu governor Moses Kasaine and Tharaka Nithi governor Muthomi Njuki. In 2019 Noordin Haji also ordered the arrest and prosecution of former treasury cabinet secretary Henry Rotich, who became Kenya's first sitting minister to be arrested for corruption.

In July 2020, Haji's office issued new rules for prosecutors on preferring charges against suspects in corruption and other criminal cases. The new rules outline the thresholds that prosecutors must check to see if the potential case either passes the evidence test, the public interest test, or both and only pursue cases with realistic prospects of conviction.

== Activists ==
The Civil society in Kenya has been at the fore front of fighting graft in the country. Renowned activists like Boniface Mwangi, Wanjeri Nderu and Okiya Omtatah have always put the government on the spot over corruption and often lead anti-corruption protests to demand for accountability.

The Kenya Police has often been condemned by citizens and Human Rights groups for meting out excessive force on protesters and infringing on their rights.

== Strong Institutions ==
According to the Ethics and Anti-Corruption Commission, Kenya is losing an estimated KSh.608 billion/= (7.8% of the country's GDP) to corruption annually. Reduced corruption is therefore crucial for the country's development. Sustainable Development Goal 16 advocates for justice and strong institutions as essential elements to every democratic society. Targets 16.3 and 16.5 aim to Promote the rule of law at the national and international levels and ensure equal access to justice for all, and substantially reduce corruption and bribery. The Sustainable Development Goals are consistent with Kenya's primary development blueprint, the Kenya Vision 2030, and President Uhuru Kenyatta's Big 4 Development Agenda.

== Security contracts ==
Listed in Githongo's dossier are a number of companies that won security-related contracts :-

Payee	Purpose	Amount (millions)	Signatories	Date signed
Anglo Leasing	Forensic LAB – CID	US$54.56	PS-Treasury; PS-Internal Security OP	16 August 2001
Silverson Establishment	Security Vehicles	US$90	PS-Treasury; PS-Internal Security OP	16 August 2001
Apex Finance	Police Security	US$30	PS-Treasury; PS-Internal Security OP	9 February 2002
LBA Systems	Security-MET	US$35	PS-Treasury	7 June 2002
Apex Finance	Police Security	US$31.8	PS-Treasury; PS-Internal Security OP	14 June 2002
Universal Satspace	Satellite Services	US$28.11	PS-Treasury; PS-Transport	11 July 2002
First Mechantile	Police Security	US$11.8	PS-Treasury; PS-Transport	11 July 2002
Apex Finance Corp	Police Security	US$12.8	PS-Treasury; PS-Internal Security OP	12 July 2002
LBA Systems	Prison security	US$29.7	PS-Treasury	19 November 2002
Nedemar	Security	US$36.9	PS-Treasury; PS-Transport	19 November 2002
Midland Bank	Police security	US$49.65	PS-Treasury	29 May 2003
Naviga Capital	Oceanographic vessel	€26.6	PS-Treasury	15 July 2003
Empressa	Oceanographic vessel	€15	PS-Treasury	15 July 2003
Euromarine	Oceanographic vessel	€10.4	PS-Treasury	15 July 2003
Infotalent	Police security	€59.7	PS-Treasury; PS-Internal Security OP	19 November 2003
Apex Finance Corp	Police security	€40	PS-Treasury; PS-Internal Security OP	17 December 2003
Ciaria Systems Inc	Design, maintain satellite NSIS	US$44.56	PS Treasury; Director NSIS	20 January 2004

== Anti-corruption authorities ==
The Ethics and Anti-Corruption Commission (EACC) was established after Kenya's president Mwai Kibaki signed the Ethics and Anti-Corruption Act on 29 August 2011. The EACC replaced the Kenya Anti-Corruption Commission (KACC).

Previously, the Kenya Anti-Corruption Commission (KACC) was established in April 2003 to replace the Kenya Anti-Corruption Authority, after Parliament enacted new legislation.

== See also ==
- 2009 Triton Oil Scandal
- 2009 Kenyan Maize Scandal
- Aaron Ringera
- Crime in Kenya
- International Anti-Corruption Academy
- International Anti-Corruption Day
- ISO 37001 Anti-bribery management systems
- Group of States Against Corruption
- Kenya Police
- Larry Timmons
- National Cereals and Produce Board scandal
- National Youth Service scandal
- OECD Anti-Bribery Convention
- Politics of Kenya
- Transparency International
- United Nations Convention against Corruption
