= Grand Regency Scandal =

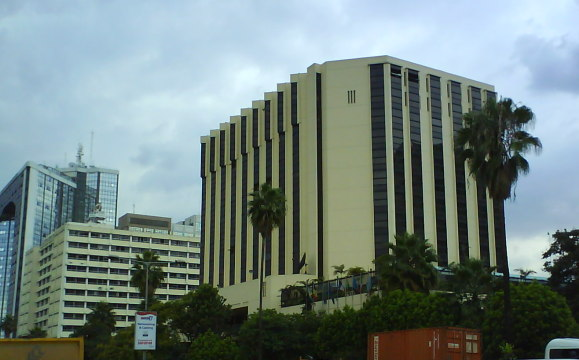

Erupting in June 2008, the Grand Regency Scandal concerned the sale of the Grand Regency Hotel in Downtown Nairobi, Kenya, from the Central Bank of Kenya to an unspecified group of Libyan investors called "Libya Arab African Investment Company". The sale was directed by Finance Minister Amos Kimunya, leading to the passage of a near-unanimous censure of Kimunya by the Kenyan Parliament on 1 July 2008. On 8 July 2008 Kimunya submitted his resignation, and called for an investigation to clear his name.

The controversy involved the no-bid nature of the sale, the secrecy under which it was negotiated, the identity of the buyers, and the price of the luxury hotel- reportedly 2.9 billion Kenyan Shillings (approx. US$44 million), around one-third of previous appraisals of the property's value in the neighbourhood of 7 billion Kenyan Shillings (approx, US$114 million). The value of the hotel was disputed by Kimunya. Lands Minister James Oreng'o blew the whistle on the sale, charging his fellow cabinet minister, Kimunya, with corruption.

== Background ==
The Grand Regency hotel played a minor part in the Goldenberg Scandal, one of the largest corruption scandals uncovered in Kenya (See article: Corruption in Kenya.) Goldenberg involved the trans-shipment of large quantities of gold through Kenya, with a 35% subsidy paid to the Goldenberg company by the Government of Kenya. Much of the gold was smuggled out of the Democratic Republic of the Congo, site of a civil war. It was estimated the earlier scandal cost the country around 10% of one years' GDP, and many of the country's current leaders have been implicated.

Kamlesh Pattni, a central figure in the Goldenberg investigations and a founder of the Goldenberg company, reportedly used proceeds from the Goldenberg scandal to build the Grand Regency. In addition to the questionable source of the funds, Pattni acquired the lands from the Central Bank of Kenya in highly suspicious circumstances. Under a law passed in 2002 offering amnesty to those who return proceeds of corruption, Pattni negotiated immunity from prosecution for his role in Goldenberg in exchange for the transfer of the Grand Regency to the Central Bank of Kenya.

== Political Fallout ==
The scandal was the first major test of the Grand Coalition government following the resolution of the 2007-2008 Kenyan crisis. The Grand Coalition included Kimunya's Party of National Unity (PNU) and their rivals, the Orange Democratic Movement (ODM).

The political dimensions to the scandal are still unfolding. Kimunya had been identified as a potential successor to President Mwai Kibaki of PNU, while Oreng'o was a member of ODM. When first alerted of the sale, Oreng'o ordered his ministry to block the transfer of the land grant, but members of the Secret Police arrived at the ministry and reportedly threatened Orengo's employees into completing the transfer. Other members of PNU, including presidential aspirant Martha Karua, joined Oreng'o and ODM in calling for full disclosure of the details of the sale, and Kimunya's resignation or dismissal, though Karua later backed off the call for dismissal. The sole member of Parliament to vote against the motion of censure was PNU-allied vice-president Kalonzo Musyoka, whose own presidential ambitions stood to improve with the divisions within the Kikuyu ethnic block of PNU, giving him a motive to support Kimunya.

On 3 July, a parliamentary committee investigating the sale issued a preliminary report recommending the suspension of the sale. The committee, headed by PNU-affiliated attorney general Amos Wako, called for the resignation or dismissal of Kimunya, as well as National Intelligence Services, Maj-Gen Michael Gichangi, Central Bank governor Njuguna Ndung'u and the secretary to the board of directors at the CBK. Additionally, the Parliament refused to consider any bills relating to the Finance Ministry, pending Kimunya's ouster. This included the National Budget.

== Commission ==
On 25 November 2008, an official inquiry cleared Kimunya of any wrongdoing. The commission's report was not made public.

=== Cost ===
In response to a query by Joseph Lekuton, on 16 December 2008, Orwa Ojode the Assistant Minister for Provincial Administration and Internal Security confirmed to parliament that the commission had cost the Kenya Government Kshs 51,224,990.

== Aftermath ==
On 23 January 2009, Kimunya was reappointed to the cabinet by President Mwai Kibaki as Minister of Trade.

== See also ==
- 2009 Kenyan Maize Scandal
- Corruption in Kenya
- 2009 Triton Oil Scandal
- Goldenberg Scandal
- Anglo-Leasing scandal
