= Joseph Kobla Wemakor =

Ghanaian journalist and youth leader

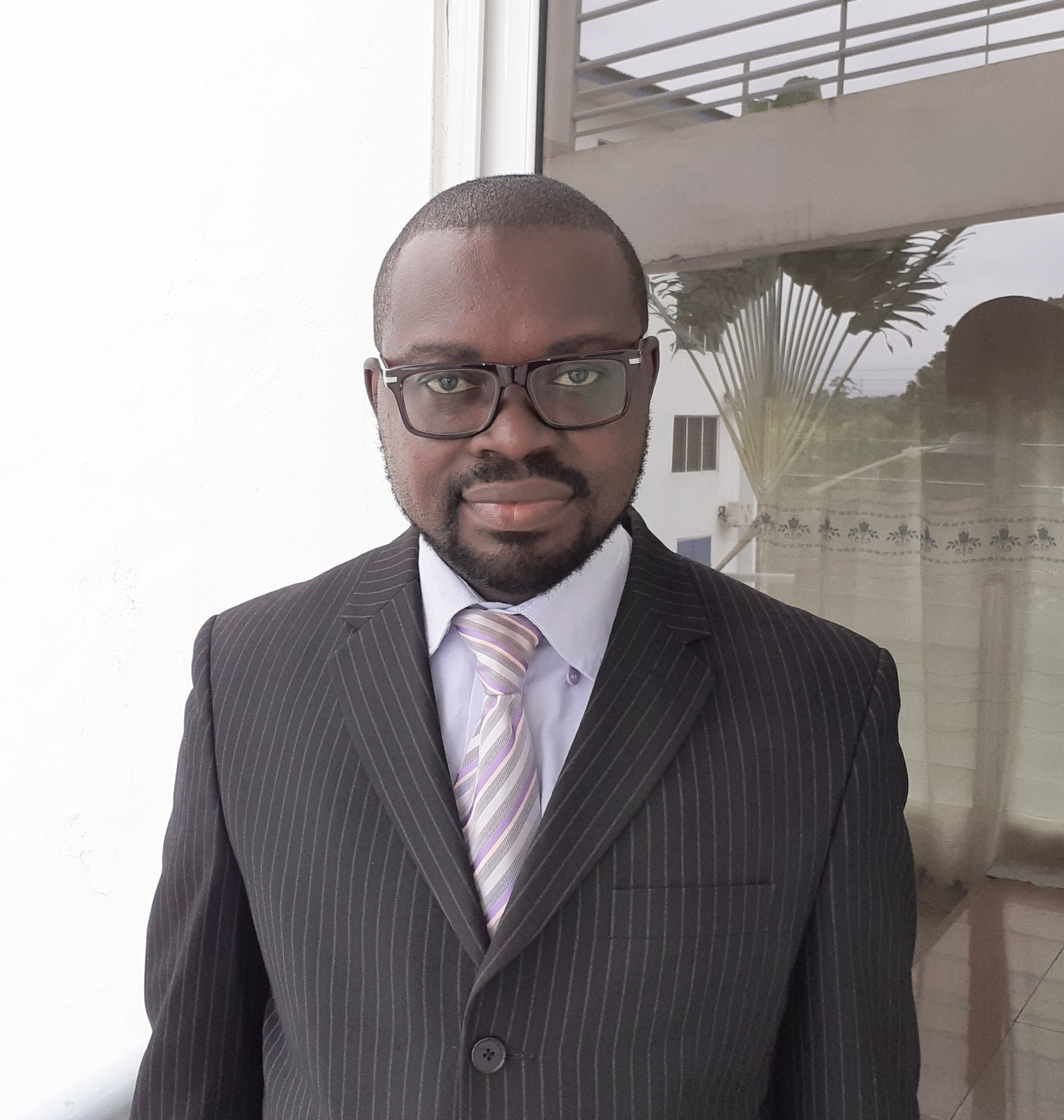
- Born: May 6
- Education: Ghana Institute of Journalism
- Occupation: Journalist
- Years active: 2010–present
- Organization: Human Rights Reporters Ghana
- Known for: Human rights activism and SDG advocacy
- Website: humanrightsreportersgh.org

Joseph Kobla Wemakor is a Ghanaian freelance journalist, youth leader, Sustainable Development Goals advocate (the Convenor of Civil Society Organizations Youth Sub-Platform on SDGs in Ghana), a trained climate change proponent and human rights activist. He is also the Head of Media and Communications of the Ghana Chapter of the PLO Lumumba Foundation and the Public Relations Officer of the Greater Accra Regional Youth Network (GARYN). In the African Network of Young Leaders for Peace and Sustainable Development, he is the National Focus Person of the taskforce in Ghana. In line with his passion as a human rights advocate, he set up Human Rights Reporters Ghana. This is a non-governmental organization which seeks to end human rights abuse against women and children both within and out of Ghana. He has worked with the United Nations Information Centre, the United Nations Population Fund, and others.

Human Rights Reporters Ghana is a non-governmental organization whose aim is to rid society of discrimination and advocate for human rights, especially for women and children. The non-governmental organization embarked on a nationwide campaign to create awareness of the dangers of kidnapping, tramadol abuse and teenage pregnancy. Within two years, over 60,000 people in three regions across Ghana benefited from the sensitization exercise.

== Role in PLO Lumumba Foundation ==
The PLO Lumumba Foundation is a Non-Governmental Organization that was registered in 1990 as a company limited by guarantee. It was established by Patrick Loch Otieno Lumumba, a Kenyan lawyer and human rights advocate, with the objective of helping make the academic dreams of brilliant but needy students become a reality. Joseph Wemakor became the Deputy Head of Media and Communications of the Ghana chapter of the foundation in February 2019 and later the Head of Media of Communications in the same foundation in 2020.

== Climate change advocacy ==
In October 2019, he was part of 19 journalists who were selected from all over Africa to receive skills training and knowledge about climate change in Addis Ababa, Ethiopia. The training program was organized by the Climate and Development Knowledge Network (CDKN) in collaboration with the Inter-Governmental Panel on Climate Change (IPCC) and the Future Climate for Africa (FCFA).

== Human rights promotion ==
In July 2022 Human Rights Reporters Ghana investigated and exposed an abuse issue in Ampaame in the Ashanti Region of Ghana. A seven-year-old girl was beaten, tied up and starved, for stealing a biscuit according to witness accounts. Their publicity of the situation got public attention, which resulted in the intervention by authorities to rescue the girl.

In 2024, Joseph Kobla Wemakor was invited by the United Nations Special Rapporteur to participate in the Pan Africa Human Rights and Social Justice Conference held in South Africa. The conference focused on addressing critical human rights and social justice issues across the continent, showcasing Wemakor's dedication to advocating for justice and equality.

Earlier that year, he was selected to join the "Fortifying the Truth" Cohort, an initiative by WITNESS, a global human rights organization. This program equips participants with skills in digital verification and video-based advocacy to counter misinformation and document human rights violations effectively. Wemakor's involvement in these international initiatives highlights his contributions to advancing human rights both in Ghana and globally.

== Awards and recognition ==
He was awarded for being the winner of the 2018 media competition on migration reporting. At the Ghana Institute of Journalism, he was the most influential media personnel during the first edition of the Campus Clique Awards in April 2016. In October 2019 he was awarded for a report he put together that gives insight into the Sustainable Development Goals (SDGs). This competition was in commemoration of the Ghana Institute of Journalism's 60th anniversary. In October 2020, he was featured in the international Business Woman Magazine based in Ukraine, with an update on upholding women's rights after the lockdown. The Human Rights Reporters Ghana (HHRG) was among the top 10 finalists for the 2020 Africans Rising Activism Award under the Movement of the Year category.

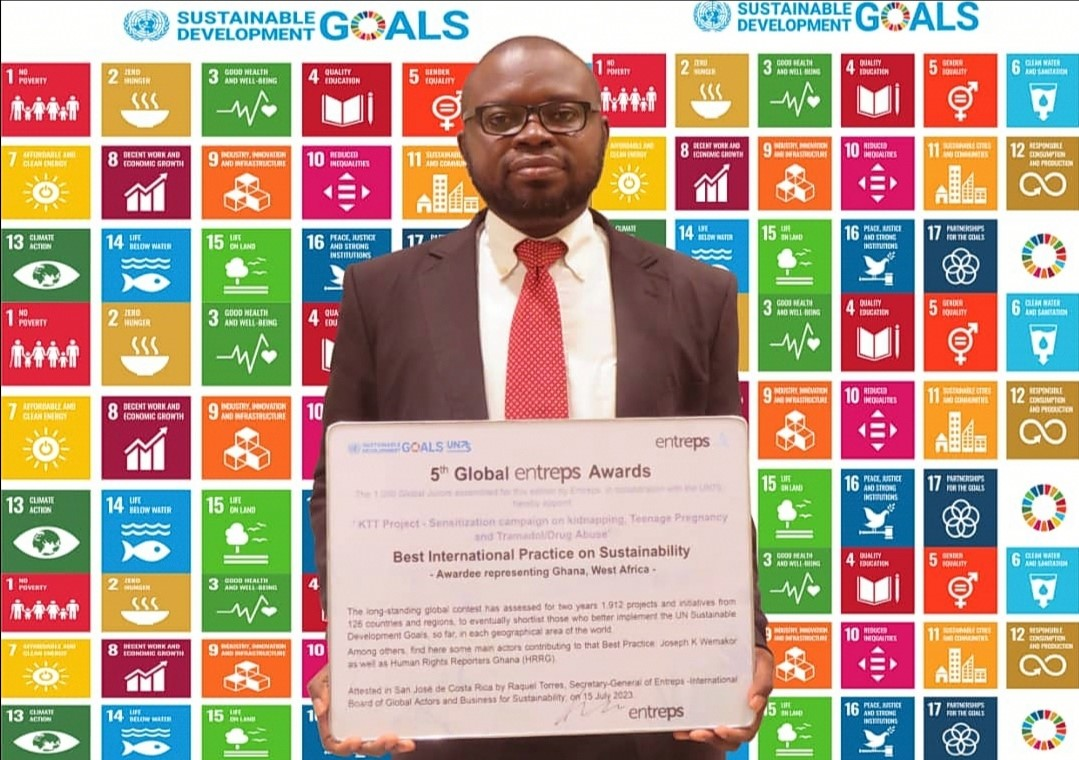
Joseph Kobla Wemakor

He won the Honorary Award for Peace, Security & Education of the Year at the maiden edition of the Africa Early Childhood Awards (AECEA) in 2021. He received a nomination for the Send Ghana Health Reporters Award in Epidemic Preparedness Response Financing. He emerged finalist for the 2023 AfricanDefenders Shield Awards by the AfricanDefenders held in Addis Ababa.

In Costa Rica, Human Rights Reporters Ghana (HRRG) won the "Best International Practice Award on Sustainability" presented at the Global Entreps Awards. The award was presented to HRRG and its founder Joseph Kobla Wemakor by Entreps-International Board of Global Actors and Business for Sustainability in partnership with UN.

Wemakor was honored with the Africa Peace Advocate Award by the International Association of World Peace Advocates in recognition of his contributions to peacebuilding.

In 2024, Joseph Kobla Wemakor, the executive director of Human Rights Reporters Ghana (HRRG), was recognized with the Global Humanitarian and Ministerial Excellence Award for his contributions to human rights advocacy and social impact. In the same year, he was awarded an honorary doctorate by the International Kingdom University in Margate, Florida, USA, in acknowledgment of his remarkable achievements.
