= Amos Kimunya =

Kenyan politician

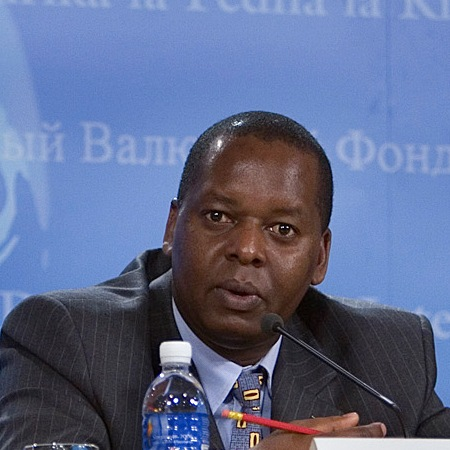
Amos Kimunya at the 2006 IMF Annual Meetings

Amos Mūhìnga Kìmunya (born March 6, 1962) is a Kenyan politician and a former Majority Leader of the National Assembly of Kenya under the Jubilee Party and former Member of Parliament for Kipipiri Constituency. He also previously served as Kenya's Minister of Trade. He was Minister of Finance from 2006 to July 2008, when he resigned due to the Grand Regency Hotel scandal. Previously, he was the Minister of Lands and Settlement. In 2019, Amos Kìmunya graduated from the United States International University (Nairobi) with a PhD in Business Administration. On June 22, Kìmunya replaced Aden Duale as the majority leader of the National Assembly.

== Early life and education ==
Kìmunya was born in Kiambu and around the same time, his family relocated to the new Nyandarua District, where he grew up. He attended Njabini Boys High School in the 1980s before joining the University of Nairobi.

He holds a Bachelor of Commerce (Accounting option) from the University of Nairobi. He is also a Certified Public Accountant (CPA) and a Certified Public Secretary (CPS). He previously served as the Chairperson of ICPAK which is the national body of Certified Public Accountants. In 2014, he was awarded a Global Executive Masters of Business Administration (GEMBA) from the United States International University Africa. He was the top student that year in the program with a GPA of 4.0.

== Political career ==
When the National Rainbow Coalition (NARC) won the December 2002 general election, President Mwai Kibaki appointed Kìmunya as the Minister of Lands and Settlement. He had been elected Member of Parliament for Kipipiri Constituency. On February 14, 2006 he was appointed as Minister of Finance by President Mwai Kibaki following the resignation of David Mwiraria, who had resigned to pave way for investigation into the Anglo Leasing Scandal.

Kìmunya remained Finance Minister in the Cabinet appointed by Kibaki on January 8, 2008, following the controversial December 2007 election. After a power-sharing agreement was reached between Kibaki and Raila Odinga, both of whom claimed victory in the presidential election, Kìmunya retained his post in the Grand Coalition Cabinet named on April 13, 2008.

== Corruption allegations ==
On July 2, 2008, Kìmunya lost a parliamentary vote of no confidence, which was based on concerns related to the sale of the Grand Regency Hotel. It was alleged that the hotel was sold for far less than its actual value when it was purchased by a Libyan company. In his defense, Kìmunya asserted that he had a clean record of fighting corruption.

Kìmunya resigned from the cabinet on 8 July 2008 to pave way for an independent commission to investigate the sale, in which he was involved, after intense public pressure for him to resign over his role in the sale of the hotel. A few days prior to his resignation, he had vowed to remain in his post and fight any attempt to force his resignation, going so far as to announce "I would rather die than resign!" Therefore, his resignation came as a surprise to many.

On 25 November 2008, an official inquiry cleared Kìmunya of any wrongdoing. The commission's report was not made public.

Kìmunya was reappointed to the cabinet by President Kibaki as Minister of Trade on 23 January 2009.

On August 15, 2009, his guard was shot dead by gangsters while driving in Nairobi. Kìmunya was not at the scene.

== See also ==
- David Mwiraria
- Joseph Githongo
