= City Council Cemetery Land Scandal =

Alleged land fraud case in Nairobi, Kenya

The City Council Cemetery Land Scandal is a scandal that in March 2010, resulted in Kenyan Deputy Prime Minister Musalia Mudavadi coming under investigation by the Kenya Anti-Corruption Commission over a Sh283 million cemetery incidence of land fraud at the Nairobi City Council. Commission officials said that they wanted to establish whether the minister was party to the fraud in which the Council bought land valued at Sh24 million for nearly Sh300 million. Mudavadi however protested his innocence and said that the commission was being unfair by accusing him without giving him a chance to be heard. Investigations are currently ongoing into the matter.

In 2016, a high court in Kenya established that Musalia Mudavadi did not receive any funds from the scandal, neither was he involved in any way in the conspiracy that led to the scandal. Thus, he was judged not culpable in any way.
