= David Munyakei =

David Sadera Munyakei (1968 - 31 July 2006) was a Kenyan noted for his role as the whistleblower of the Goldenberg scandal which significantly damaged the Kenyan economy in the early 1990s. He was born in 1968 at Lang'ata Women's Prison where his mother worked as a prison warden.

== Employment at Central Bank of Kenya ==
Before Munyakei was offered employment at the Central Bank of Kenya (CBK) he had also been accepted as a cadet in the Army. He was planning to join the army when he received the CBK offer. He accepted the CBK offer which was prestigious and difficult to come by and joined CBK in 1991.

Munyakei would later narrate that he was qualified and followed the proper procedure to get the CBK job which also included opportunities for further studies. He intimated that he went to CBK instead of college since after three years he would be given a scholarship to university within the banking provisions for training.

== Goldenberg and aftermath ==
When Munyakei realized that he was processing payment for the export of diamonds and gold (which did not exist in Kenya), he grew suspicious and informed Onyango Jamasai. Jamasai was a trusted senior confidante of Munyakei at CBK. When Jamasai confirmed Munyakei's suspicions, he (Munyakei), sneaked out copies of sensitive documents and presented them to then opposition MPs Paul Muite and Peter Anyang' Nyong'o. Nyong'o and Muite would later present the papers in parliament and this would cause an uproar across the whole country.

Munyakei was arrested and spent several days in jail before a judge ruled that he had no case to answer. Munyakei was subsequently fired from his position at the Central Bank of Kenya. After being told by a friend that his life might be in danger, he moved to Mombasa. He spent the next decade of his life poor and largely unemployed. He died in August 2006, leaving behind three daughters and his wife.

== Personal life ==
While living in Mombasa, Munyakei worked as an advertising agent for the Standard group and later Nation Media Group. After leaving Nation, he worked as a sales representative for a furniture company. While in Mombasa, he converted to Islam and took the name Rajab. He was married to Mariam with whom he had three daughters. After failing to find employment in Mombasa, he moved to his rural Olokurto, in Narok County, where he took up subsistence farming. He had an elder brother, Daniel. His story has been serialized in a book The True Story of David Munyakei (ISBN 9966-7008-9-7).

== See also ==
- Corruption in Kenya
- Goldenberg scandal
