= Abdul Rahim Dawood =

Kenyan businessman

Honourable Abdul Rahim Dawood MP

Member of the Kenyan Parliament
- Incumbent
- Assumed office March 2013
- Preceded by: Silas Muriuki
- Constituency: North Imenti
- Majority: 26,871

Personal details
- Born: 1964 (age 61–62) Maua, Kenya
- Party: APK
- Other political affiliations: PNU; KNC
- Spouse: Hawa
- Children: 2;Tanya Musani and Alisha Musani
- Education: KeMU (BBA)
- Occupation: Member of Parliament
- Nickname: Muhindi (Indian)Marete

Abdul Rahim Dawood is a Kenyan businessman who was elected as a member of the Kenyan Parliament in the 2013 parliamentary elections.
