= 2013 Samburu local elections =

Local elections in Kenya

Local elections were held in Samburu to elect a Governor and County Assembly on 4 March 2013. Under the new constitution, which was passed in a 2010 referendum, the 2013 general elections were the first in which Governors and members of the County Assemblies for the newly created counties were elected.

== Gubernatorial election ==
Candidate	Running Mate	Coalition	Party	Votes
Lekupe, Stephen Lmosta	Lanyasunya, Andrew Ropilo		The National Alliance	--
Legala, David William	Koronyokwe, Fred Marmalei		Mazingira Green Party of Kenya	--
Lenolkulal, Moses Kasaine	Lemarkat, Joseph		United Republican Party	--
Lolwerikoi, Michael	Letoiye, Daniel Lejaroi		Orange Democratic Movement	--
