= James Kabingu Muregi =

Kenyan politician

J. K. Muregi

Member of Parliament, Kipipiri Constituency
- In office 1988–1992
- Succeeded by: Laban Muchemi

Member of Parliament, Nyandarua South Constituency
- In office 1969–1979
- Preceded by: Gideon J. Kago

Deputy Speaker, Parliament of Kenya
- In office 1975–1979
- Preceded by: Jean-Marie Seroney

Minister for Livestock Development
- In office 1991–1992

Assistant Minister for Environment
- In office 1989–1991

Chairman, Pyrethrum Board of Kenya
- In office 1980–1988

Personal details
- Party: KANU

James Kabingu Muregi is a Kenyan clergyman and former politician from Nyandarua County. He served as an elected MP representing the old Nyandarua South Constituency during the presidency of the late Jomo Kenyatta. He was later elected MP Kipipiri Constituency, as its inaugural Member of Parliament, during the presidency of the late Daniel arap Moi. He was a staunchly loyal member of KANU, and Arap Moi rewarded his loyalty with cabinet positions in the late 1980s.

A plaque marking the opening of a District Livestock Office by James Kabingu Muregi, while Minister for Livestock Development

He lost his parliamentary seat when Multiparty politics returned to Kenya in the General election of 1992. He also served as chairman of the Pyrethrum Board of Kenya in the 1980s, as well as several stints as a chairman of various local KANU branches in Nyandarua. He retired from politics in 1994 to enter religious ministry.
