= P. L. O. Lumumba =

Kenyan lawyer (born 1962)

Professor, SC P. L. O. Lumumba
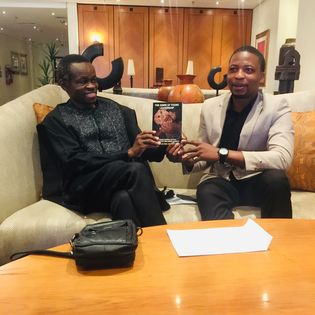
- Timothy and PLO Lumumba in Lusaka

Director of Kenya School of Law
- Incumbent
- Assumed office March 2014
- Deputy: Margaret Muigai
- Preceded by: Bitonye Kulundu

Director of Kenya Anti-Corruption Commission
- In office September 2010 – August 2011
- President: Mwai Kibaki
- Preceded by: Aaron Ringera

Personal details
- Born: Patrick Loch Otieno Lumumba; 17 July 1962 (age 64) Usenge, Kenya
- Children: 2
- Education: University of Nairobi (LL.B), (LL.M); Kenya School of Law (PGDip); Ghent University (PhD)
- Profession: Lawyer
- Positions: Founder, PLO Lumumba Fndn; Dean, School of Law, Kabarak University

Patrick Loch Otieno Lumumba (born 17 July, 1962) is a Kenyan lawyer, activist, and public speaker. Born in Usenge, a town in Siaya County, Kenya., he is an Advocate of the High Courts of Kenya and Tanzania and a notable Pan-Africanist recognised as one of the leading public speakers across the African diaspora. He served as the director of the Kenya School of Law and as director of the Kenya Anti-Corruption Commission from July 2010 to August 2011. He holds honorary doctorate degrees from the University of Cape Coast in Ghana and Bells University in Nigeria.

== Education ==
Lumumba earned his LLB and LLM degrees at the University of Nairobi, where his LLM thesis was titled National Security and Fundamental Rights. He holds a Doctor of Laws (LL.D) in the Law of the Sea from Ghent University in Belgium, with a thesis entitled Exclusive Economic Zone: The Use and Delimitation of Economic Zones. He also holds honorary doctorate degrees from the University of Cape Coast in Ghana and Bells University in Nigeria.

== Academic and public positions ==
Lumumba was the secretary of the Constitution of Kenya Review Commission, whose proposed draft constitution was rejected in a 2005 referendum.

=== Kenya Anti-Corruption Commission ===
On 23 July, 2010, Lumumba was named as the new director of the Kenya Anti-Corruption Commission. He took office on 26 July, succeeding Aaron Ringera. The commission launched several high-profile investigations during his tenure, but none led to significant criminal convictions.

After just over a year in office, on 29 August 2011, Lumumba and his four deputies vacated their offices as required by the recently enacted Ethics and Anti-Corruption Commission Act, which replaced the commission with a new Ethics and Anti-Corruption Commission. During the parliamentary debate on the new legislation, several politicians had been highly critical of Lumumba's performance.

=== Kenya School of Law ===
On 17 March 2014, Lumumba took office as director of the Kenya School of Law. In August 2018, he said that he would not seek another term in the office.

== Political views and public speaking ==
He is a notable Pan-Africanist and has delivered several speeches alluding to or about African solutions to African problems. He is an admirer of Kwame Nkrumah, the first president of Ghana, and of Patrice Lumumba and Thomas Sankara, the assassinated revolutionary leaders of the Democratic Republic of the Congo and Burkina Faso respectively. Lumumba has referred to and quoted them several times in his speeches. Lumumba is also remembered for his emotion-laden and energetic speech in Uganda at the third Anti-Corruption Convention. On 28 August 2015, the PAV Ansah Foundation invited Lumumba to speak at the 2015 PAVA Forum on "Good Governance and tiop, Whither Africa?"

At the lecture, Lumumba expressed his serious concern about the energy crises that African leaders have allowed to reach such a devastating stage. Lumumba also talked about the issue of African youth fleeing the continent. Lumumba blamed them on the economic hardships and the "misgovernment" from their leaders. Lumumba encouraged African leaders to rise to the challenge of changing the fortunes of the continent. In 2017, Lumumba gave a moving speech to youths in Kenya on the importance of making bold choices at The Fearless conference 2017.

In July 2023, Lumumba gave the keynote speech at the ten-year anniversary celebration of the Economic Freedom Fighters, a South African political party. The event, held at the University of Cape Town, attracted protests because of Lumumba's views about homosexuality, including his support for Uganda's anti-homosexuality bill.

In 2024, Lumumba started hosting a TV show, Lumumba's Africa, on the Russian state-owned RT TV network.

== Personal life ==
According to Lumumba, he has practiced martial arts since 1975 and is a third dan black belt in shotokan karate.

Prof. Lumumba is married to Celestine Lumumba and together, they have two daughters.

== Books ==
Lumumba has written several books on law and politics:

- Kenya's Quest for a Constitution: The Postponed Promise
- Call for political hygiene in Kenya
- An Outline of Criminal Procedure in Kenya
- Judicial review in Kenya
- Call for Hygiene in Kenyan Politics
- The Quotable P.L.O. Lumumba
- Judicial review of administrative actions in Kenya
- A handbook on criminal procedure in Kenya
- Stolen Moments
- The Constitution of Kenya, 2010: An Introductory Commentary
- Mhhh Afrika!!!
- Ang'o marach?
