= North Imenti Constituency =

Kenyan electoral constituency

North Imenti
- constituency for the Parliament of Kenya
- North Imenti Constituency within Meru County

- Meru County within Kenya
- County: Meru
- Population: 177,567
- Area: 232 km^{2} (89.6 sq mi)

Current constituency
- Number of members: 1
- Party: JP
- Member of Parliament: Abdul Rahim Dawood
- Wards: 5

North Imenti is an electoral constituency in Kenya. It is one of nine constituencies of Meru County. The constituency was established for the 1988 elections. The constituency contains 5 wards.

It was one of three constituencies of the former Meru Central District. Its headquarters are in Meru Town.

== Members of Parliament ==
Election/ Year	MP	Party	Notes
1988	Jackson Angaine	KANU	One-party system.
1992	Daudi Mwiraria	DP	
1997	Daudi Mwiraria	DP	
2002	Daudi Mwiraria	NARC	
2007	Silas Muriuki	Mazingira	
2013	Abdul Rahim Dawood	APK	
2022	Abdul Rahim Dawood	JP	

== Wards ==
There are 5 wards in North Imenti Constituency: Municipality, Nyaki West, Nyaki East, Ntima West, and Ntima East. As of 2022, there are 96,241 registered voters.

Ward	Registered Voters
Municipality	23,655
Nyaki West	21,192
Ntima West	19,161
Nyaki East	17,329
Ntima East	14,904
Total	96,241
*As of 2022
