= James Kanyotu =

Kenyan Spy Chief (1936–2008)

James Kanyotu (1936-2008) was Kenya's longest serving spy chief. He headed the Directorate of Security Intelligence (‘Special Branch’), for 27 years, from 1965 until his retirement in 1991. Born in 1936 in Kirinyaga District, Kanyotu attended Alliance High School (Kenya) and Makerere University where he got a diploma in teaching. Kanyotu joined the police force in 1960. In 1965, he became the deputy head of intelligence and took over from Bernard Hinga who was Kenya’s first spy chief - and remained so until 1992. He had seven children: John Kariuki, Stephen Njau, Christopher Ngata, Sandra Gathoni, Grace Nyawira, Christine Wangari, and Stephani Njeri.

He was implicated as one of the masterminds of the Goldenberg scandal as he was a director at Goldenberg international. He left office as one of the wealthiest businessmen in the country. His family has been locked in a battle for his estate since.
