= Wanjeri Nderu =

Kenyan activist

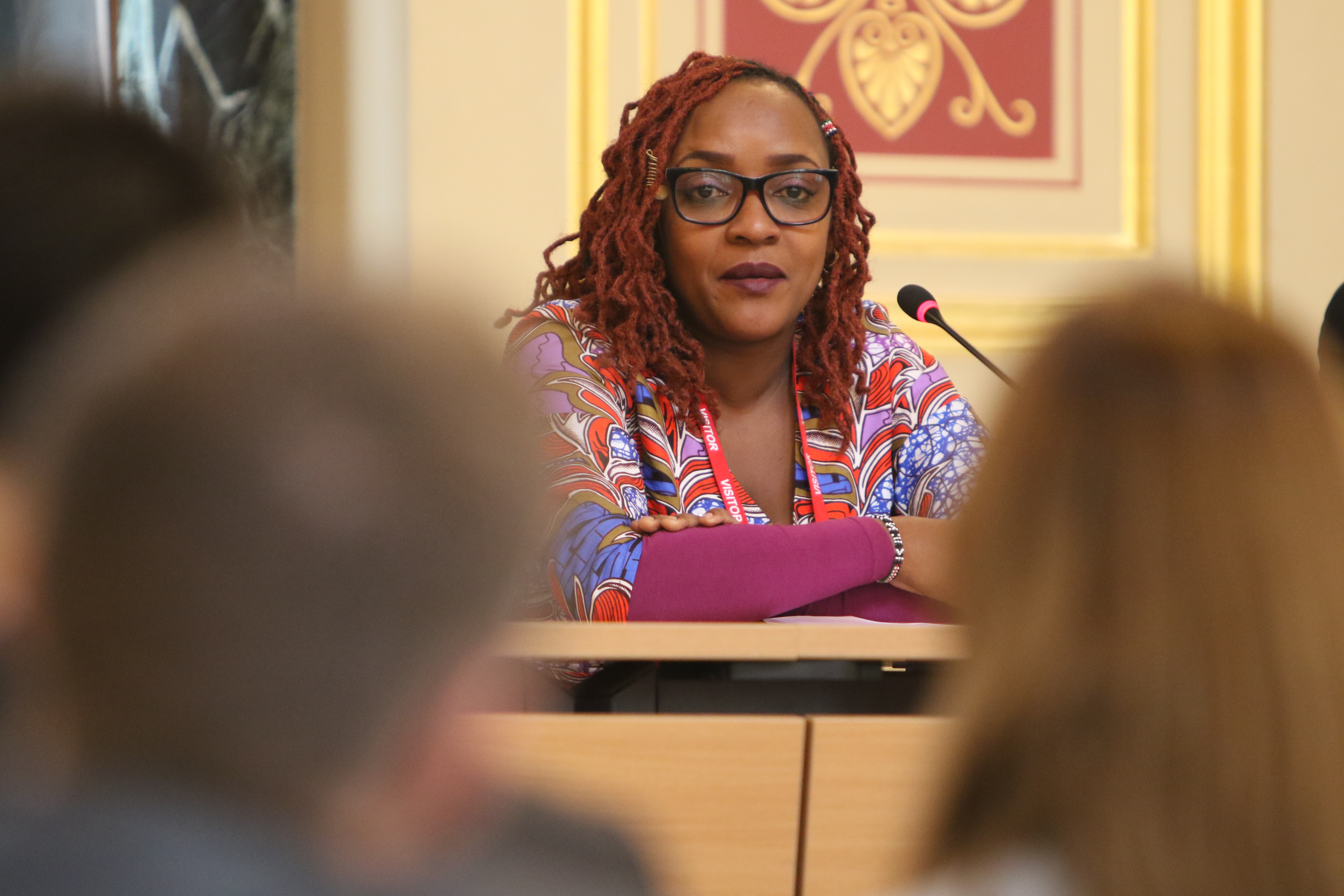
- Born: Nairoibi
- Occupation: Human Rights Activist

Wanjeri Nderu (born 1979) is a human rights activist from Kenya.

== Biography ==
Nderu was born in 1979 and grew up in Nairobi. She attended Racecourse Primary School in Kariakor, Mountain View Academy in Thika and then Kahuhia Girls High School. Her political awareness began in childhood, when her estate was attacked as part of the 'Saba Saba' riots. She studied broadcast journalism at the Kenya Institute of Mass Communications, before beginning a career in 2005 in the insurance industry.

In 2013 Nderu left the insurance industry with the idea of volunteering for social justice organisations for one year. It was this period that kick started her activism. To fund her activism and support her family she is a self-employed communications consultant for third sector organisations. She is Kikuyu and is married with four children.

== Activism ==
Nderu sees herself as a social justice crusader, working to shed light on many injustices in Kenya. She uses social media to mobilise people and often campaigns on issues that have fallen through the gaps between NGOs, such as the rape of male minors. She has run several campaigns online, including: #StopExtraJudicialKillings, #FreeSSudan4, as well as campaigning for free and peaceful elections. She has been harassed in person and online on many occasions. In 2014 she was arrested for attending a peaceful protest against higher wages for politicians in Kenya. In 2015 she was attacked by a man in a shopping centre, which left her face swollen ad bruised. She came close to losing her eye. Nderu believes she was attacked because she had been speaking out about corruption in Kenya, at the centre, as well as online. In 2017 she was followed home by an unmarked vehicle, which forced her to leave her car elsewhere, escape through a cafe and get a taxi home. The #JusticeForKhadija case, which Nderu was involved in, highlighted the roles that women in particular play at the level of grassroots activism in Kenya.

In 2018, Nderu joined the University of York on a Human Rights Defenders Fellowship, with the goal in mind to learn how to create space and systems for mental health wellbeing for activists in Kenya. She also hosted an event for International Human Rights Day at the British Foreign and Commonwealth Office. Earlier in the year she and other human rights activists took the Kenya government to court over corruption within state-owned companies - the campaign was called Stop These Thieves On Your Own.

In 2019 she participated in the University of Birmingham Report on gender-based violence in Kenya, highlighting her experiences as an activist.

== Awards ==
- International Anti-Corruption Day Awards, 2016 - Integrity Award
- Protective Fellowships for Human Rights Defenders, 2018 - Fellowship
