= Goldenberg scandal =

1991–1993 Kenyan gold export political scandal

The Goldenberg scandal was a political scandal where the Kenyan government was found to have subsidised exports of gold far beyond standard arrangements during the 1990s, by paying the company Goldenberg International 35% more (in Kenyan shillings) than their annual foreign currency earnings. Although it notionally appears that the scheme was intended to earn hard currency for the country, it is estimated to have cost Kenya the equivalent of more than 10% of the country's annual gross domestic product, and it is possible that no or minimal amounts of gold were actually exported. The scandal appears to have involved political corruption at the highest levels of the government of Daniel Arap Moi. Officials in the former government of Mwai Kibaki have also been implicated.

== Background ==
At the end of 1991, the Kenyan government faced pressure to implement major reforms. As a condition for the restoration of US$ 350 million of loans, Kenya's donors demanded the implementation of reforms including, liberalisation of the marketing of agricultural products, budget cuts, privatisation of state owned enterprises, and exchange rate liberalisation.

Nairobi's black market had seen a growing volume of gold and other precious jewels smuggled from countries like Angola, Rwanda, and Congo. This illicit trade drew attention from the Central Bank and various businessmen including Kamlesh Pattni.

== Details ==
The scheme began in 1990, almost immediately after the Kenya government, following directions from the IMF, introduced measures to reform the economy and increase international trade and investment, and seems to have stopped in 1993 when it was exposed by a whistleblower, David Munyakei.

Goldenberg International Limited was granted a monopoly in November 1990 on the condition that the business would guarantee minimum annual earnings of US $50 million to the Central Bank. The Export Compensation Act set the compensation for non traditional exports at 20%. George Saitoti Kenya's finance minister authorised another 15% ex gratia payment to Goldenberg International to the objections of Treasury advisers.

By 1991, Goldenberg was falsifying invoices and even illegally importing gold in order to claim the export compensation. At the peak of the scheme Goldenberg exported US $400 million (on paper), and received US $45 Million in export compensation.

Pattni was also granted the right become a foreign currency dealer and operate a bank. These businesses allowed him to account for the alleged sales and launder money to various members of KANU, Kenya's ruling party at the time.

The immediate consequence of the scheme was a sharp increase inflation which coincided with low GDP growth by the end of 1992. The exchange rate went from 30 Ksh per US$ in 1990, 70 Ksh per US$ in 1994.

Munyakei, the whistleblower, was fired from his position at the Central Bank of Kenya, and remained largely unemployed until his death in 2006. There have been two investigations on the scam, one under the Moi government and the other under the Kibaki's government.

== Bosire report ==
On 3 February 2006, following an investigation under the Kibaki government, a report by Justice Bosire recommended that the Education Minister at that time, George Saitoti, should face criminal charges for his actions and that former President Daniel arap Moi should be further investigated. Saitoti was both vice-president and finance minister under Moi in the early 1990s. On 13 February, Saitoti's resignation was announced by President Kibaki in a television address.

The Bosire report found that KSh.158.3 billion/= of Goldenberg money was transacted with 487 companies and individuals. A list of exhibits compiled by the commission placed Goldenberg International Ltd at the top of the primary recipients of the money, at KSh.35.3 billion/=. The directors of Goldenberg were named as Pattni and James Kanyotu. Although Kanyotu was the director of the Special Branch (intelligence unit of the Kenya Police, now known as National Intelligence Services, NIS) and a director of First American Bank, he described himself as a farmer in Goldenberg documents. President Moi was named by Pattni as having been a shareholder of GIL by nominee. However, President Moi himself was never called to present evidence despite this alleged link.

=== Cost ===
In response to a query by Joseph Lekuton, on 16 December 2008, Orwa Ojode the Assistant Minister for Provincial Administration and Internal Security confirmed to parliament that the commission had cost the Kenya Government Kshs 511,569,409.90.

=== Travel restrictions ===
Shortly after, Saitoti along with 20 several others suspected to be involved in the scandal were prohibited from leaving the country and ordered to surrender any weapons they possessed. Among those named were

- Gideon Moi, retired President Moi's son, also the Baringo Central MP
- Mr Philip Moi, retired President Moi's son
- Mr Moi's lawyer, Mr Mutula Kilonzo
- Mr Moi's former personal assistant, Mr Joshua Kulei
- Former Central Bank of Kenya governor Eric Kotut
- former Central Bank of Kenya deputy governor Eliphas Riungu
- former Central Bank of Kenya employee Job Kilach.
- former Central Bank of Kenya employee Tom Werunga
- former Central Bank of Kenya employee Michael Wanjihia
- Philip Murgor, the former director of public prosecutions
  - Mr Murgor's law firm represented the Central Bank of Kenya during the two-year public inquiry headed by Mr Justice Bosire.
- Former Treasury permanent secretary Charles Mbindyo
- former Treasury permanent secretary Wilfred Karuga Koinange
- former Treasury permanent secretary Joseph Magari
- Prof George Saitoti, who resigned as Education minister.
- Goldenberg architect Kamlesh Pattni
- Pattni's business partner and former Special Branch chief James Kanyotu
- former commissioner of Mines and Geology Collins Owayo
- Mr Arthur Ndegwa, senior mining engineer in the Commissioner of Mines Nairobi office
- former commissioner of Customs and Excise Francis Cheruiyot.
- former Kenya Commercial Bank general manager Elijah arap Bii

Former president Moi himself was not listed.

The Law Society of Kenya chairman Tom Ojienda criticised Police Commissioner Hussein Ali's move to seize travel documents. He described the decisions as "a total violation of the law and the Constitution". Ojienda regretted that individuals had been charged, tried and convicted by the court of public opinion and the media or through political statements. He commended three Cabinet ministers who resigned to pave way for investigations into the Anglo Leasing and Goldenberg scandals. "The resignation of three members of Cabinet signifies the maturity of our democracy, where leaders whose reputations are besmirched would opt to resign pending investigations to clear their names rather than hold the Government hostage. Such resignations are no pointers to guilt."

== Prosecution ==
Two transactions stand out – one for KSh.5.8 billion/= from the Central Bank to Goldenberg International in 1993, personally authorised by then-president Daniel Arap Moi, and another for KSh.13.5 billion/=. The then CID director Joseph Kamau told reporters on 9 March 2006 that files on Pattni, Kanyotu, Koinange, Kotut, Bii, Riungu and Werunga had been passed to attorney-general Amos Wako. Wako has been attorney-general since 1991, when Moi was in power.

Wako is recommending that the country's chief justice consider overturning a previous court order exempting Mr Saitoti from prosecution. All except Werunga are to be charged. The prosecution hopes that Werunga will be their witness.

In August 2006, it was reported that a constitutional court had ruled that Saitoti could not be charged. The Kenyan media reacted negatively to the decision. The Kenya Times saw political motives behind it, while The Daily Nation editorialised that the "War on graft is, indeed, lost".

== See also ==
- Corruption in Kenya
- Anglo Leasing Scandal
- 2009 Triton Oil Scandal
- 2009 Kenyan Maize Scandal
- Kenya Police
- Politics of Kenya
- Crime in Kenya
- Group of States Against Corruption
- International Anti-Corruption Academy
- International Anti-Corruption Day
- ISO 37001 Anti-bribery management systems
- OECD Anti-Bribery Convention
- United Nations Convention against Corruption
- Transparency International
