= Kipipiri Constituency =

Kenyan electoral constituency

Kipipiri
- constituency for the Parliament of Kenya
- Kipipiri Constituency within Nyandarua County

- Nyandarua County within Kenya
- County: Nyandarua
- Population: 93,855
- Area: 456 km^{2} (176.1 sq mi)

Current constituency
- Number of members: 1
- Party: UDA
- Member of Parliament: Muhia Wanjiku
- Wards: 4

Kipipiri Constituency is an electoral constituency in Kenya. It is one of five constituencies in Nyandarua County. The constituency has four wards, all of which elect MCAs for the Nyandarua County. The constituency was established for the 1988 elections and borders Olkalou, Kinangop and Gilgil Constituencies. The inhabitants of the constituency are largely of Kikuyu extraction. Its biggest town is Miharati, which acts as the subcounty headquarters. The constituency is largely poor, with a poverty index of below the national average. The main activity for the residents is farming, with cabbages, Irish potatoes, milk, carrots, and onions being the main products. It has poor roads, and receives rainfall for a large part of the year, save for the lower areas bordering Gilgil that are dry.

== Members of Parliament ==
Elections	MP	Party	Notes
1988	James Kabingu Muregi	KANU	One-party system.
1992	Laban Muchemi	Ford Asili	
1995	Githiomi Mwangi	DP	By-elections
1997	Githiomi Mwangi	DP	
2002	Amos Kimunya	NARC	
2007	Amos Kimunya	PNU	
2013	Samuel Gichigi	APK	
2017	Amos Kimunya	JAP	
2022	Wanjiku Muhia	UDA	

== Wards ==
Ward	Registered Voters
Geta	8,599
Kipiriri	12,589
Githioro	8,018
Wanjohi	13,911
Total	37,117
*September 2005.
