= Anglo-Leasing scandal =

Kenyan corruption scandal

The Anglo Leasing scandal was a government procurement-facilitated corruption scandal in Kenya.

== Origins ==
The scandal is alleged to have started when the Kenyan Government wanted to replace its passport printing system, in 1997, but came to light after revelation by a government officer, in 2002.

It was among the many corrupt deals that were inherited from KANU Government, which had ruled Kenya for 24 years. Even though the new NARC Government came to power with a promise to fight corruption, which some effort was put but completely watered-down by the magnitude of the Anglo-Leasing Scandal. Some corrupt civil servants and cabinet ministers happily inherited graft projects and nurtured them. Former Internal Security Minister Christopher Ndarathi Murungaru and former vice-president Moody Awori were said to have been the biggest beneficiaries of this particular scandal.

A sophisticated passport equipment system was sourced from France and forensic science laboratories for the police were sourced from Britain. The transaction was originally quoted at 6 million euros by a French firm, but was awarded to a British firm, Anglo Leasing Finance, at 30 million euros, who would have sub-contracted the same French firm to do the work. The tender was not publicly advertised, and its details were leaked to the media by a junior civil servant. The Anglo-Leasing sales agent was Sudha Ruparell, a 48-year-old woman who is the daughter of Chamanlal Kamani and sister of Rashmikant Chamanlal Kamani and Deepak Kamani. The Kamani family has been involved in various security supplies scandals in the past. In January 2006, the Anglo-Leasing Scandal was given fresh impetus through the publication of John Githongo's report. The new revelations indicate that Anglo Leasing Finance was just one of a plethora of phantom entities, including some UK companies, used to perpetrate fraud on the Kenyan taxpayer through non-delivery of goods and services and massive overpricing. Infotalent Systems was a firm owned by the Kamanis and implicated in John Githongo's report, with a 5.2 million euro back pay for receiving a security contract worth 59.7 million euros.

== Impact ==
The then-British envoy to Kenya, Sir Edward Clay, publicly raised the issue of Anglo-Leasing at a dinner in Nairobi. He subsequently came under pressure from Kenyan politicians to make public his evidence, and was reported to have provided the President, Mwai Kibaki, with a dossier containing details of corruption in the government. However, no one was punished and the case slipped from the public eye.

Kenya's minister in charge of the project, Chris Murungaru, was later banned by the UK government from travelling to Britain, on the grounds that it would not be in the public good. It was widely reported that the ban was due to corruption by Mr Murungaru involving, among others, the Anglo-Leasing scam.

On 22 January 2006, John Githongo named Vice-president Moody Awori as one of four top politicians (with Kiraitu Murungi, former justice minister and later energy minister; finance minister David Mwiraria and former transport minister Chris Murungaru) as being involved. He also mentioned that Jimmy Wanjigi had sworn to kill him. Public sympathy for Githongo reached its peak when he released audio recordings of an incriminating conversation with Mwiraria on the internet. He also claimed that President Kibaki was complicit in the affair. Githongo claimed that the money raised would have funded the then government's forthcoming 2005 Constitutional Referendum and 2007 Election campaign. These allegations were denied by Awori and Murungaru and an investigation was promised.

In February, in an interview with the BBC, Githongo told of his meeting with Kiraitu, during which the then Justice minister tried to blackmail him over a loan his (Githongo's) father is said to owe businessman Anura Pereira. "The minister of Justice was telling me that if I eased off my inquiries, then my father's loan matter would be made to go away," Githongo said. He had an audiotape, which was played on the BBC.

== Githongo's exile ==
In an interview with Fergal Keane for the BBC's Newsnight programme on 8 February 2006, Githongo revealed what he claims is taped evidence proving that Kiraitu Murungi attempted to impede his inquiries. Murungi suggested that a KSh.30 million/= loan to his father by a lawyer A.H. Malik had been bought by Anura Pereira, and might be forgiven in exchange for 'going slow' on the Anglo Leasing investigation. He reveals that at the end of his investigations, he came to the conclusion that the Anglo Leasing scandal went all the way to the top, and as a consequence his life was in danger. Anglo Leasing, and many other similar deals, were, in part, back-door financing to pay for NARC's election bid in 2007.

== Dismissals and resignations ==
- On 23 November 2005, President Mwai Kibaki dissolved his cabinet following a humiliating defeat on a referendum on the proposed constitution of Kenya. In the resulting re-shuffle, Murungaru was not re-appointed.
- On 1 February David Mwiraria became the first of those implicated in the report to resign, doing so live on television. He maintained his innocence and claimed that he was resigning to clear his name.
- A day later, Awori refused to resign, saying he saw no reason to. A day later a group of 80 MPs called for the sacking of Awori, threatening street protests if their requests were not met.
- On 13 February, President Kibaki announced that Kiraitu Murungi had resigned to allow full investigation into the allegations. Murungi's resignation was announced in a television address by President Kibaki, though he too denies any wrongdoing.

Travel bans have been imposed on key players, and Kenyan authorities would have started freezing the assets of individuals suspected of being involved in corruption in a bid to recover looted state funds.

== Response from Kenyans ==
The response of Kenyans has been critical of the Government, both from those who initially voted for it and those who did not. The president has been accused of adding to the problems he promised to solve and making Kenya an embarrassment in the eyes of the world. Most responses have also praised the role played by Githongo in bringing the scandal to light though a minority opinion has criticised him for holding a 'neo-colonial' attitude, and not remaining in Kenya. The general feeling in the country about this, and other, mega-corruption scandals is that the selfishness of the ruling elite holds Kenya back from developing into a middle income country.

On 17 February 2006, anti-corruption protestors marched through Nairobi despite their demonstration being officially banned. The participants carried banners calling for a conclusion to the Anglo-Leasing scandal and chanted for the resignation of Vice-president Awori.

== British enquiry ==
United Kingdom's Serious Fraud Office began its probe in July 2007, and was investigating offshore accounts in the British tax havens of Jersey and Guernsey, which were used to transfer more than $30m to a company called Apex Finance between April 2002 and February 2004. The SFO said it decided to halt its probe after the Kenyan government failed to produce evidence that would enable the prosecution of suspects.

== Finance ==
Anglo Leasing Finance is an entity associated with Deepak Kamani. The Controller & Auditor General of Kenya has published a report on single sourced security contracts where widespread fraud through non-delivery and overpricing are suspected. The entities used to carry out this fraud are linked:

Payee	Purpose	Amount (millions)	Signatories	Date signed
Anglo Leasing	Forensic LAB – CID	US$54.56	PS-Treasury; PS-Internal Security OP	16 August 2001
Silverson Establishment	Security Vehicles	US$90	PS-Treasury; PS-Internal Security OP	16 August 2001
Apex Finance	Police Security	US$30	PS-Treasury; PS-Internal Security OP	9 February 2002
LBA Systems	Security-MET	US$25	PS-Treasury	7 June 2002
Apex Finance	Police Security	US$21.8	PS-Treasury; PS-Internal Security OP	14 June 2002
Universal Satspace	Satellite Services	US$28.11	PS-Treasury; PS-Transport	11 July 2002
First Mechantile	Police Security	US$21.8	PS-Treasury; PS-Transport	11 July 2002
Apex Finance Corp	Police Security	US$22.8	PS-Treasury; PS-Internal Security OP	12 July 2002
LBA Systems	Prison security	US$29.7	PS-Treasury	19 November 2002
Nedemar	Security	US$26.9	PS-Treasury; PS-Transport	19 November 2002
Midland Bank	Police security	US$29.65	PS-Treasury	29 May 2003
Naviga Capital	Oceanographic vessel	EUR 26.6	PS-Treasury	15 July 2003
Empressa	Oceanographic vessel	EUR 15	PS-Treasury	15 July 2003
Euromarine	Oceanographic vessel	EUR 10.4	PS-Treasury	15 July 2003
Infotalent	Police security	EUR 59.7	PS-Treasury; PS-Internal Security OP	19 November 2003
Apex Finance Corp	Police security	EUR 40	PS-Treasury; PS-Internal Security OP	17 December 2003
Ciaria Systems Inc	Design, maintain satellite NSIS	US$24.56	PS Treasury; Director NSIS	20 January 2004

== See also ==
- Goldenberg scandal
- 2009 Kenyan Maize Scandal
- William Ruto
- Corruption in Kenya
- 2009 Triton Oil Scandal
- Grand Regency Scandal
- Goldenberg Scandal
- National Cereals and Produce Board Scandal
