= Kenya Anti-Corruption Authority =

The Kenya Anti-Corruption Authority (KACA) of Kenya was established in 1997 after the amendment of the Prevention of Corruption Act (Cap 65, LOK) in early 1997. The first director was John Harun Mwau who was appointed in December 1997. In April 2003, it was replaced by the Kenya Anti-Corruption Commission (KACC) which was subsequently replaced by the Ethics and Anti-Corruption Commission (EACC).

== See also ==
- Corruption in Kenya
- Kenya Anti-Corruption Commission
- Ethics and Anti-Corruption Commission
