= Farida Karoney =

Kenyan politician

Farida k Karoney

Cabinet Secretary for Lands
- Incumbent
- Assumed office 26 January 2018
- President: Uhuru Kenyatta

Personal details
- Born: Tanzania
- Education: Kenyatta University (Bachelor of Science Education); University of Nairobi (Postgraduate Diploma in Mass Communication) (Master of Business Administration) (Doctor of Philosophy)

Farida Karoney is a Kenyan who was nominated by President Uhuru Kenyatta as Cabinet Secretary for Lands, on 26 January 2018. Immediately prior to her present position, she served as the chief operating officer (COO) of the Royal Media Services (RMS), a media conglomerate that includes radio and television stations. Before that, she served as the Group Editorial Director at RMS.

== Background and education ==
Farida Karoney attended Kenyatta University, from 1989 until 1992, graduating with a Bachelor of Science Education degree in Botany and Zoology. She then went on to the University of Nairobi (UoN), where she obtained a Postgraduate Diploma in Mass Communication, in 1996, after one year of study. She enrolled in the MBA degree course at UoN in 2005, graduating in 2008 with a Master of Business Administration, specializing in Strategy. Later, she obtained a Doctor of Philosophy degree, also from UoN, specializing in strategic management.

== Career ==
For a period of less than one year, in 1993, Farida taught biology at Khamis High School in Mombasa. In June 1994, she joined Kenya Television Network (KTN), first as a freelance correspondent, then as a reporter, rising to the position of Features Editor, at the time she left KTN in December 2000.

In January 2001, she joined the Nation Media Group (NMG), as an editor and rose to the rank of Associate Editor by July 2004, when she left NMG. She then worked as the Managing Editor at The Standard Group, for a period of two years, from September 2004 until August 2006.

From there, Farida worked as a freelance contributor to Radio France Internationale, working in that capacity for about one year, between 2006 and 2007. For the last six months of that period, she also freelanced for the Al Jazeera English language network, as a producer.

In 2007 she went back to Standard Media Group and worked as the Head of Editorial at their flagship TV station, KTN, for about one year. During that period, she concurrently served as the assistant director for broadcasting at Standard Group Limited, until December 2008. For five consecutive years, beginning in February 2009, Farida Karoney served as the Group Editorial Director at Royal Media Services, until 2014. In August 2014, she was promoted to the position of chief operating officer, at RMS, a position she occupied at the time of her nomination to become the Cabinet Secretary for Lands.

== See also ==
- Amina Mohamed
- Raychelle Omamo
- Margaret Kobia
