= Moses Wetang'ula =

8th and Current Speaker of the National Assembly of Kenya

The Right Honourable Moses Wetang'ula E.G.H.
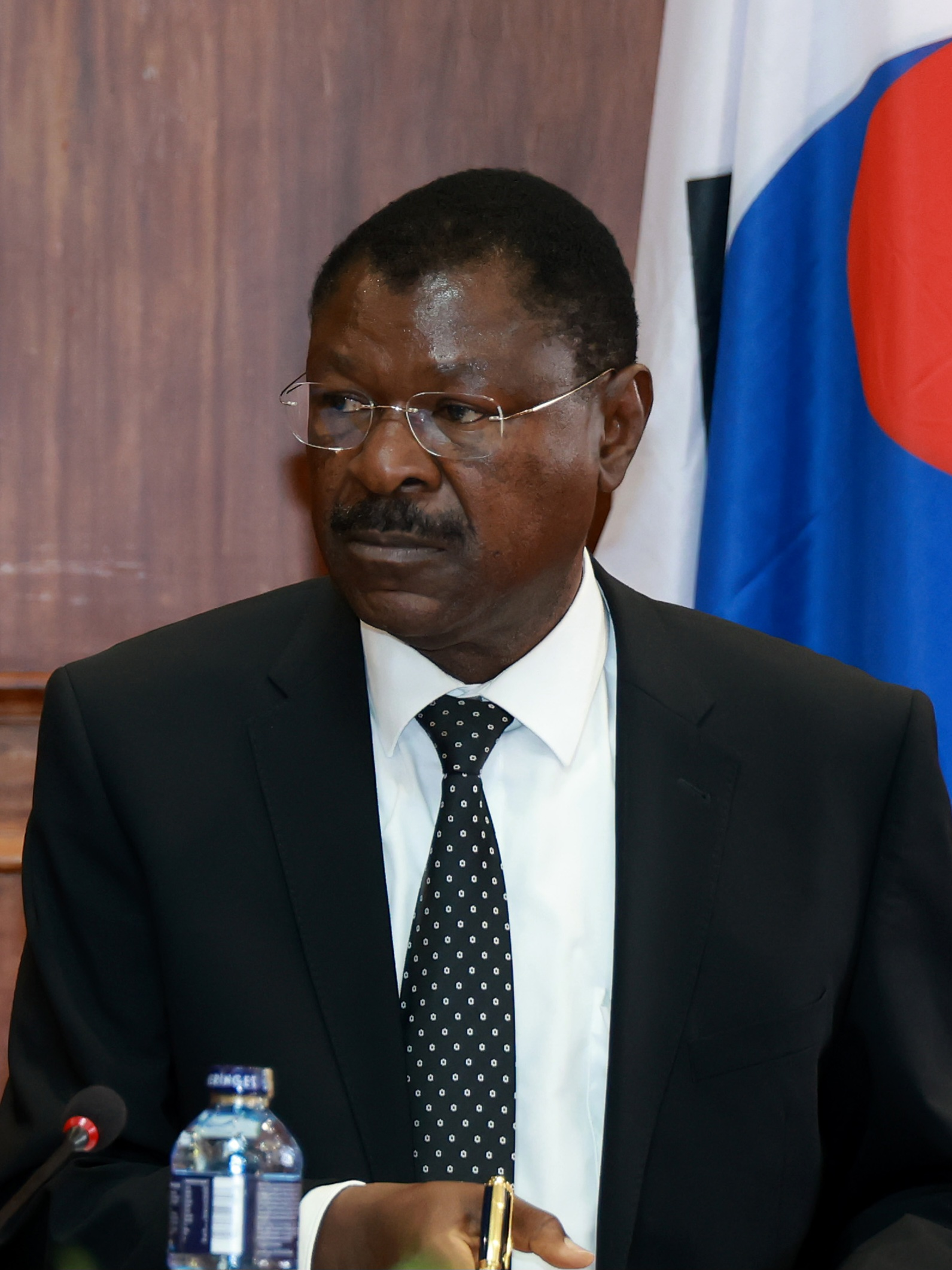
- Wetang'ula in 2026

8th Speaker of the National Assembly of Kenya
- Incumbent
- Assumed office 8 September 2022
- Preceded by: Justin Muturi

Leader of Minority in the Senate
- In office 17 April 2013 – 15 March 2018
- Preceded by: Position established
- Succeeded by: James Aggrey Orengo

Senator for Bungoma County
- In office 28 March 2013 – 8 September 2022
- Preceded by: Position established
- Succeeded by: Wafula Wakoli

Minister for Trade
- In office 27 March 2012 – 10 April 2013
- President: Mwai Kibaki
- Preceded by: Chirau Ali Mwakwere
- Succeeded by: Position abolished

21st Minister for Foreign Affairs
- In office 10 January 2008 – 27 March 2012
- President: Mwai Kibaki
- Preceded by: Raphael Tuju
- Succeeded by: George Saitoti (acting)

Assistant Minister for Foreign Affairs
- In office 17 June 2003 – 10 January 2008
- President: Mwai Kibaki

Member of Parliament
- In office 9 January 2003 – 14 January 2013
- Preceded by: John Barasa Munyasia
- Succeeded by: John Waluke Koyi
- Constituency: Sirisia

Nominated Member of Parliament
- In office 26 January 1993 – 10 November 1997
- President: Daniel arap Moi

Personal details
- Born: Moses Masika Wetang'ula; 13 September 1956 (age 70) Nalondo, Bungoma County, Kenya (then North Nyanza District, Colony and Protectorate of Kenya)
- Party: FORD-Kenya; Kenya Kwanza
- Other political affiliations: KANU (before 1997)
- Spouse(s): Phyllis Wetang'ula, Ann Wacheke Wetangula and others
- Relations: Timothy Wanyonyi Wetangula (brother)
- Children: 5
- Parent: Mzee Dominic Wetang'ula (father)
- Education: University of Nairobi (LLB)
- Occupation: Politician
- Profession: Lawyer
- Website: http://www.parliament.go.ke https://www.facebook.com/WetaMosse

Moses Francis Masika Wetang'ula (born 13 September 1956), is the Speaker of the National Assembly of Kenya in 2025, after being elected on September 8, 2022. He is also the leader of the FORD-Kenya, one of the most popular political parties in Western Kenya. He served as Kenya's Minister for Foreign Affairs from 2008 to 2010 and from 2011 to 2012, and as Minister for Trade from 2012 to 2013.

== Early life and education ==
Wetangula attended Nalondo Primary School, Busakala Secondary school, Teremi Secondary School, and Friends School Kamusinga. He graduated from the University of Nairobi with a Bachelor of Laws (LLB) degree. He was a member of the Board of Directors of ICROSS Kenya from 1989, until he became Kenya's Minister for Foreign Affairs.

== Political career ==
Wetangula was nominated as a Kanu MP after the 1992 general election, serving until 1997. He had served as a magistrate before his nomination and later as chairman of the Electricity Regulatory Board after his 1997 election loss. Wetangula actively participated in organisation of funds-drives to set up projects on self-help basis and has been offering legal services to the local people. He has mobilised women and the youth to initiate income generating projects.

Wetangula was elected to the National Assembly in the December 2002 parliamentary election, and has never lost in any of the election he has participated ever since. He was appointed into the cabinet by President Mwai Kibaki on 8 January 2008, amid Kenyan crisis, 2007-2008 regarding the results of the concurrent presidential election, Wetangula was named Minister for Foreign Affairs. Later in January, in reaction to criticism from the United Kingdom regarding the presidential election, Wetangula summoned the United Kingdom's High Commissioner, Adam Wood, to complain, and he said that "our elections don't need a stamp of authority from the House of Commons". After a power-sharing agreement was reached between Kibaki and Raila Odinga, both of whom claimed victory in the presidential election, Wetangula retained his post in the Grand Coalition Cabinet named on 13 April 2008.

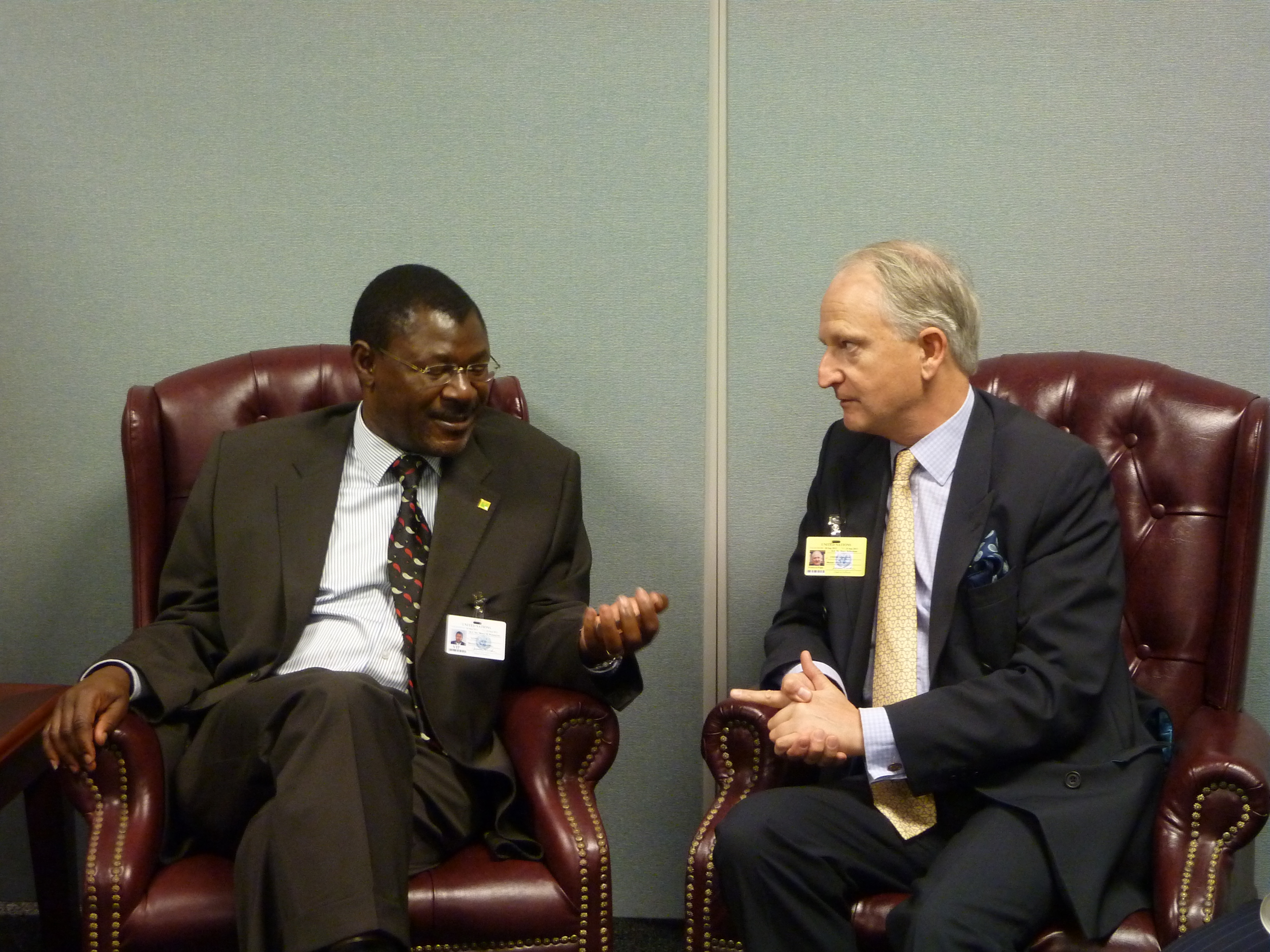
British Minister for Africa Henry Bellingham met Kenyan Foreign Minister Moses Wetangula on 21 September 2011 in New York City.

In March 2012, Wetangula was stranded in Bamako, Mali during a coup d'état. He was evacuated after being trapped in his hotel room for several days. Shortly after his return, he was appointed Trade Minister by Kibaki.

He was elected to the Senate of Kenya in 2013, representing Bungoma County, and became Minority Leader in the Senate of Kenya. He was later replaced in the position of Minority Leader by the then Senator of Siaya County James Orengo. This is because Raila Odinga was unhappy with the fact that his fellow party member ODM was not given that position and therefore instructed that Orengo should replace Wetangula. 16 ODM senators signed a petition to oust him out as the minority leader. Wetangula warned them, "If anyone wants a divorce, it would be messy, it would be noisy, it would be unhelpful, it would not be easy, it would have casualties", he said. Raila Odinga became a casualty after losing the presidential contest in 2022 general election, as Wetang'ula made William Ruto the fifth President of Kenya. In the run-up to the August 2022 Kenyan general election, Wetang'ula and his party Ford Kenya joined forces with other parties to form the Kenya Kwanza Alliance, where he became a co-principal. Wetang'ula was re-elected with a landslide win as Bungoma senator in the August 2022 Kenyan general election, but he resigned shortly afterwards to vie for the position of the Speaker of the National Assembly of Kenya, hence becoming the third in line of succession in the Republic of Kenya. On 8 September 2022, Wetangula defeated his only competitor, former speaker Kenneth Marende to become the speaker of the 13th Parliament of Kenya.

=== Tokyo embassy scandal ===
Wetangula stepped down as Minister for Foreign Affairs on 27 October 2010 due to an investigation on his alleged involvement in the Kenyan Tokyo embassy scandal. It was alleged that instead of accepting free property from the government of Japan for the embassy, his ministry opted to spend 1.6 billion shillings($14million then) for a building further away from central Tokyo, against the advice of an estate agency. Money was also allegedly lost on embassy deals in Egypt, Nigeria, Pakistan and Belgium, some of which was withheld from the sale of Kenyan property in Nigeria.George Saitoti served as acting foreign minister during Wetangula's absence.

Wetangula was later absolved of the allegations and any wrongdoing by five separate probes and returned to the ministry in August 2011, though he permanently left the position a few months later to successfully contest for the position of Senator for Bungoma County.

=== Senate Minority Leader ===
After winning election to the Senate, Wetangula was selected to serve as Minority Leader of the Senate of Kenya representing the Coalition for Reforms and Democracy. The Bungoma High Court nullified his election on 30 September 2013 and the Speaker of the Senate declared the seat vacant on 16 October 2013. In a by-election held on 19 December 2013, Ford Kenya candidate Moses Wetangula recaptured his Bungoma senatorial seat with a landslide win after garnering 149,458 votes against his main contender Musikari Kombo, who got about a half of the votes.

Kombo, who was vying on a New Ford Kenya ticket, came second with 81,016 votes followed by independent candidate David Makali and Labour Party of Kenya candidate Bifwoli Wakoli at a distant third and fourth place respectively.

Makali secured 2,155 votes while Wakoli garnered 1,899 votes from a total of 942 polling stations, with a 57 per cent voter turnout.

On 20 March 2018, Wetangula was replaced by Siaya senator James Orengo as Senate Minority leader.

=== Speaker of The National Assembly ===
Wetangula retained his Bungoma senate seat in the August 2022 Kenyan general election, winning by a landslide. However, he resigned shortly after from that position in order to vie for the position of the Speaker of the National Assembly of Kenya. On 8 September 2022, he contested successfully to become the speaker of the 13th Parliament of Kenya. Wetangula had garnered a total of 214 votes against Marende's 130 votes, while he did not attain the requisite 2/3's of the votes cast in order to win in the first round, he was nevertheless elected as speaker since his only competitor Kenneth Marende withdrew from the second round. Wetangula took over from Justin Muturi and became the 8th Speaker of the National Assembly of Kenya.

== Personal life ==
Wetangula's father, Mzee Dominic Wetangula, is a retired teacher in Nalondo, Bungoma County and lives in the village together with his wives. His family is a political family with his younger brother Timothy Wanyonyi Wetangula being the MP for Westlands Constituency in Nairobi County. His other siblings include Fred Wetangula a Nairobi-based businessman and the Late Tony Waswa Wetangula. He also has a younger sister Emmeryncian Naswa.

Moses Wetangula has several wives. He has several wives, including Ann Wacheke Wetangula and Phyllis Wetangula, but lives separately only from the latter. Wetangula's Children include his son Fidel Wetangula, Daughter Sheila Wetangula, Tamara Wetangula, and Alvin Habwe Wetangula who was appointed as board member of Kenya Railways. Both Tamara and Alvin Habwe are civil engineers. He also has many other children with his other wives.

Wetangula is a supporter of English Premier League club Arsenal.

== See also ==
- James Orengo
- Embassy Property Purchase Scandal
