= Mazingira Green Party of Kenya =

Political party in Kenya

- Founder: Wangari Maathai
- Founded: 1997?
- Headquarters: Akiba Estate, Plot 42, South C, Nairobi
- Ideology: Green politics
- International affiliation: Global Greens

Website
- https://www.mazingiragreenparty.com/

The Mazingira Green Party of Kenya is a Kenyan political party associated with green politics. Formerly known as the Liberal Party of Kenya (LPK), it participated in the National Rainbow Coalition in the 2002 general election and in the Party of National Unity in the 2007 general election, while also fielding its own candidates in 2007. The word Mazingira is Swahili for environment.

== History ==
The party was formerly known as the Liberal Party of Kenya (LPK).

At the 2002 general election, the party was part of the victorious NARC coalition. Wangari Maathai won the Tetu Constituency parliamentary seat.

At the 2007 general election, Mazingira was part of the newly created Party of National Unity led by President Mwai Kibaki. Mazingira also fielded its own candidates. Silas Muriuki defeated PNU candidate David Mwiraria to win the North Imenti Constituency parliamentary seat for Mazingira.

== Terminology ==
The word Mazingira is Swahili for environment.

== See also ==
- Conservation movement
- Environmental movement
- List of environmental organizations
- Sustainability
- Sustainable development
