= David Mwiraria =

Kenyan politician

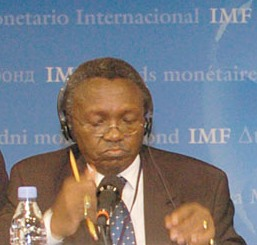
- Mwiraria taken during the IMF Spring Meeting 2004
- Constituency: North Imenti

Minister for Environment and Natural Resources
- In office 24 July 2007 – December 2007
- President: Mwai Kibaki
- Preceded by: Kivutha Kibwana
- Succeeded by: John Michuki

Minister for Finance
- In office 2003 – 1 February 2006
- President: Mwai Kibaki
- Preceded by: Chris Obure
- Succeeded by: Amos Kimunya

Personal details
- Born: David (Daudi) Mwiraria; September 3, 1938 Kenya
- Died: April 13, 2017 (aged 78) Nairobi, Kenya
- Party: Party of National Unity
- Other political affiliations: Mazinga Green Party of Kenya
- Education: Makerere University (MSc in Statistics)
- Occupation: Politician
- Known for: Anglo Leasing scandal

David (Daudi) Mwìraria (3 September 1938 – 13 April 2017) was the Minister for Environment and Natural Resources and previously Finance Minister of Kenya until December 2007 when Kenya held its General Elections. Running for re election on a Party of National Unity ticket, defending his seat as Member of parliament for North Imenti Constituency, he was defeated by Silas Muriuki, who was running on a Mazingira Green Party of Kenya ticket.

Prior to going into elective politics, he had a long and distinguished career in Kenya's civil service, serving in various senior positions hence his having recently appeared as a witness before Kenya's Truth, Justice and Reconciliation Commission as a witness to testify on the Government of Kenya's role in the Wagalla massacre. Following allegations that he had been involved in the Anglo Leasing Scandal, he decided to resign as Finance Minister on 1 February 2006. He maintained that he was innocent and claimed that he was stepping down to pave the way for investigations. Despite there being no investigation report clearing Mwìraria, President Mwai Kibaki appointed him Minister for Environment on 24 July 2007. He got his master's degree in statistics from the Makerere University, Uganda 1966 (then part of the University of East Africa). Mwìraria features prominently in audio recordings released on the internet in 2006 by John Githongo, exiled former Permanent Secretary in the Kenya Government, which indicate Mwìraria was trying to stop Gìthongo's inquiries into the theft of over 700 million US Dollars in a series of 18 security related contracts, colloquially called Anglo Leasing. He died of bone cancer on 13 April 2017 at Karen Hospital in Nairobi, Kenya.

== Travel ban ==
In December 2007, Mwìraria, Nicholas Biwott, and Ramniklal Panacha Shah were banned from traveling to or through the United Kingdom due to the then pending corruption charges.
