= Silas Muriuki =

Kenyan politician (1949–2023)

Silas Mūriūki Rūteere (12 January 1949 – 6 September 2023) was a Kenyan politician who was a member of the National Assembly of Kenya. Mūriūki was the sole representative of the Mazingira Green Party of Kenya and represented the North Imenti Constituency.

Prior to becoming a member of parliament, Mūriūki worked as a teacher and was the head teacher of a school for the deaf.

Mūriūki died on 6 September 2023, at the age of 74.
