= Kamlesh Pattni =

Kenyan politician (born 1965)

Paul Kamlesh Pattni
- Born: Kamlesh Mansukhlal Damji Pattni; 1965 (age 60–61); Mombasa, Kenya
- Occupations: Businessman; politician; pastor
- Political party: Kenya National Democratic Alliance
- Awards: Lifetime Africa Achievement Prize for Humanitarianism and Equity

Paul Kamlesh Pattni (born 1965; also known as Brother Paul) is a Kenyan businessman and politician who was implicated in the 1990s Goldenberg scandal.

== Background ==
Kamlesh Pattni was born and raised in Mombasa, Kenya. He later moved to practice business in Nairobi, where he allegedly used his company to acquire billions of shillings, in league with prominent politicians and government officials in the Goldenberg scandal.

The Daily Nation reports that Kamlesh Pattni is now a baptised Christian, taking the name of Paul and running his own church.

In March 2013, a High Court judge, Justice Joseph Mbalu Mutava, let Pattni and his associated companies "off the hook" over the KSh 5.8 billion Goldenberg scandal.

== Political career ==
Pattni is the chairman of the Kenya National Democratic Alliance (KENDA), a political party in Kenya. He was a parliamentary candidate at the 2007 elections. He unsuccessfully contested the Westlands Constituency in the 2013 election and received 10,083 votes.

== Personal life ==
He was born into a Hindu family and later converted to Christianity and took the name Paul on his baptism.

In 2012, he was awarded the Lifetime Africa Achievement Prize for Humanitarianism and Equity by the Ghanaian Excellence Awards Foundation.
