= Ethics and Anti-Corruption Commission =

Kenyan government agency

The Ethics and Anti-Corruption Commission, abbreviated as the EACC, is a Kenyan government agency established to combat and prevent corruption in the country. The commission operates through direct law enforcement and preventive measures in addition to the education and promotion of standards and best practices in integrity and ethics in Kenya.

The EACC was established on 29 August 2011 after Kenya's President Mwai Kibaki signed the Ethics and Anti-Corruption Act, replacing the former Kenya Anti-Corruption Commission pursuant to the 2010 Constitution of Kenya.

== Background ==
Kenya has had anti-corruption legislation dating back to 1956; The Prevention of Corruption Act (Cap. 65) was in operation from August 1956 to May 2003 when the Anti-Corruption and Economic Crimes Act of 2003 became operational and repealed it. Combined with the Public Officer Ethics Act of 2004, the Kenya Anti-Corruption Commission was established, replacing the earlier Kenya Anti-Corruption Authority.

In 2006, the African Peer Review Mechanism (APRM) conducted a peer review in Kenya. Corruption was identified as an overreaching obstacle to sustainable development in the country. Kenya's Country Review Report from the APRM indicated a lack of effectiveness in Kenya's mechanism to combat corruption, namely with the KACC and Public Officer Ethics Act. For example, the KACC was mandated to investigate corruption but lacked the authority to prosecute cases. Additionally, many of the cases recommended to Attorney General failed to target top political officials, which the APRM attributed to a lack of security of tenure among KACC officials.

Additionally, critics of Kenya's anti-corruption mechanisms had pointed to a lack of constitutional order regulating ethics and corruption among Kenya's public officials. Kenya had relied on statutory order which grants executive, legislative, and judicial actors' broad powers without establishing effective procedural mechanisms to oversee their exercise.

Regionally and internationally, Kenya has been known for an eagerness for launching anti-corruption initiatives: in 2003 Kenya ratified the United Nations Convention Against Corruption and in 2007 Kenya ratified the African Union Convention on Preventing and Combating Corruption.

=== Establishment ===
This Parliament of Kenya disbanded the KACC on 24 August 2011, in line with the requirements for change as stipulated after the promulgation of the 2010 Constitution. The 2011 Ethics and Anti-Corruption act replaced the former KACC with the Ethics and Anti-Corruption Commission. Commissioners Irene Keino and Prof. Jane K. Onsongo were appointed on 11 May 2012 to be the first heads of the agency.

== Function ==
The EACC is operationally independent from the legislative and executive branches of government. The commission consists of 5 members: a chairperson, vice-chairperson, and 3 other commissioners, each of whom require a formal appointment from the President followed by the approval of the National Assembly. A similar process is required for any commissioner to be removed before the end of their term. Each commissioner has the security of tenure, serving six-year terms, and can only be removed by a tribunal following a recommendation by Parliament to the President. Commissioners must sign a Leadership and Integrity Code, committing them to abide by the regulations set by the 2012 Leadership and Integrity Act.

The operational wing of the EACC is led by the Secretary of the Commission, who is appointed by the commissioners with the approval of the National Assembly and may serve a maximum of one, six-year term. The Secretary oversees the Secretariat, which is composed of professional, technical, and administrative officers and support staff who are appointed by the Commissioners and are responsible for the day-to-day functions of the EACC.

The 2011 Ethics and Anti-Corruption Act empowers the agency to perform the following functions:

- Use preventive measures against corrupt and unethical behavior.
- Conduct investigations on its own initiative, or as a result of a complaint made by any person.
- To educate and create awareness of the commission's mandate among the public.
- To conduct mediation, conciliation and negotiations

The EACC's mandate is limited to public officials and public funds, which includes state-owned enterprises or private-sector entities with public investment, such as Kenya Airways, a publicly traded company where the government of Kenya is a stakeholder. As a part of this mandate, any person is able to submit a complaint of corruption with the protection of anonymity.

The Commission is headquartered in Nairobi, with five regional offices in Mombasa, Kisumu, Nyeri, Eldoret and Garissa.

The current chairperson is David Oginde, who assumed office May, 9th 2023. The current secretary is Abdi Mohamud Ahmed, who was appointed by the commission November 23rd, 2024.

== Implications ==
The EACC has had mixed reactions from politicians, the international community, and the citizens of Kenya.

=== Citizen Engagement ===
A 2016 EACC survey showed that 79.3 percent of Kenyans believed corruption was high in Kenya. Despite this, there is little public trust in the commission, with only 43.9 percent of respondents saying they trusted the EACC in the same 2016 survey. In the 2016/17 fiscal year of the 8,044 corruption complaints lodged with the EACC only 3,735 were investigated.

In response to a lack of trust in the formal systems, citizens have taken to grassroots movements to bring awareness to corruption. For example, the 2015 #KnockOutCorruption campaign sought to pressure public officials to fight corruption and declare their wealth to increase transparency through grassroots mobilization. In March 2016, President Uhuru Kenyatta announced a "war on corruption" during his State of the Nation Address. During his address Kenyatta unveiled new asset recovery initiatives and the retrieval of hundreds of millions of shillings in addition to the formation of the new Anti-Corruption and Economic Crimes Division of the High Court to take on EACC cases. While the campaign forced some changes, its stalling out was attributed to the public's perception of a lack of significant change, as well as a fear of police brutality: a December 2016 protest ended in beatings and 33 arrests.

=== International Assessment ===
The 2016 APRM review of Kenya once again mentioned corruption as an overreaching obstacle to development in the country. While the 2010 Constitution, 2011 Ethics and Anti-Corruption Act, and ratification of the United Nations Convention Against Corruption established a legal framework grounded in accountability, the EACC and other anti-corruption mechanism remained weak in Kenya. A significant critique was the EACC's lack of prosecutorial powers, which seen by a lack of charges filed against those found culpable by the EACC's investigative processes. The EACC's lack of prosecutorial powers has been attributed to a prevailing view in Kenyan politics that the Director of Public Prosecutions should have the exclusive mandate to prosecute.

Kenya receives considerable international aid, amounting to US$2.4 billion annually, yet only US$4.9 million of that amount is targeted toward anti-corruption initiatives, yet many sources of aid have expressed concern that their aid would be misused as a result of corruption.

=== Covid-19 ===
The Government of Kenya allocated nearly KES100 billion towards COVID-19 related expenditures to combat the effects of the pandemic, as a part of its Covid-19 Emergency Response Project. Additionally, Kenya received nearly KES200 billion in foreign aid to combat the pandemic through December of 2020.

During the Pandemic, there were widespread allegations of public embezzlement and misuse of response funds, especially against the Kenyan Medical Supplies Authority Offices (KEMSA). An investigation by the EACC revealed irregular expenditure of US$71.96 million and established criminal culpability of public officials involved in the improper purchase and supply of Covid-19 emergency commodities. Despite the EACC recommending charging the suspected officials and businesses under Kenya's anti-corruption and economic crimes legislation, no officials had been charged for graft related to the actions of KEMSA during the pandemic.

== See also ==
- Corruption in Kenya
- Kenya Anti-Corruption Authority
- Kenya Anti-Corruption Commission
