= 2009 Triton Oil Scandal =

Illegal embezzlement of Kenyan oil production

The 2009 Triton Oil scandal involved the alleged theft of up to $47 million (USD) worth of petroleum products from the Kenya Pipeline Company by the Triton Petroleum Company. Yagnesh Devani, the CEO of Triton Oil during the scandal, fought extradition for years before returning to Kenya for trial in 2024. The scandal was one of the three large corruption scandals in Kenya that broke in 2009, alongside ones involving maize importation and the embezzlement of primary education funds. It was one of the largest corporate fraud cases in Kenya's history.

== The scheme ==
The Kenya Pipeline Company (KPC) is a state corporation owned by the Kenyan government. In the late 2000s, the KPC handled oil imports via a monthly open-tender bidding system. The company with the winning bid was tasked with importing that month's oil supply and selling it to the other companies at a pre-set price. The system was implemented to benefit from economies of scale; by selecting a single importer each month, that company would ideally be able to import a large quantity at a lower price. This process covered oil imports not only into Kenya, but also Uganda, Rwanda and Burundi.

As part of this process, the oil companies stored their oil at a KPC storage space, and the amount of storage was allocated between companies based on their market share. Triton had a small market share, but they began storing a disproportionate amount of oil at the Kipevu Oil Storage Facility in 2008. Their large oil stores allowed them to engage in profitable market speculation, as the price of oil was volatile but rising; by stockpiling excess oil, they could sell it later once the price rose.

Triton amassed this oil in collusion with KPC staff; they took advantage of a new but not yet completely-implemented computer tracking system to transfer oil to Triton without paying for it. 126.4 million litres of oil were released to Triton without approval. In late 2008, the price of oil fell by nearly two-thirds, from 140 USD per barrel to 50 USD. Triton could no longer sell their oil at a profit, and by December 2008, Triton was placed into receivership, with outstanding debts of 7.6 billion Kenyan shillings (approx. US$100 million USD in 2008). The investigation into the missing stocks found that oil had been being released to Triton since November 2007.

== Aftermath ==
The Triton scandal became public knowledge in early January 2009, around the same time as the 2009 Kenyan Maize Scandal. Kenya's Energy Minister, Kiraitu Murungi ordered Kenya's anti-corruption commission to investigate the oil theft, and the next day, the managing director of KPC was sacked. KPC's chairman of the board was also removed shortly thereafter.

Triton Oil was owned by Yagnesh Devani. By the end of January 2009, he was at large and believed to be in hiding in the UK or India. A warrant for his arrest was obtained in June 2009. In 2011, Kenya agreed to extradite two Kenyans facing charges of money laundering, with the UK working to locate and extradite Devani as part of the deal. The UK eventually filed a deportation order against Devani for extradition to Kenya. Although Devani appealed the order, he was extradited to Kenya in January 2024.

During Devani's time outside the country, four people who had been considered as co-defendants alongside him were cleared for lack of evidence. Devani was charged separately in August 2024, after his return. However, in October 2024, prosecutors dropped the case against Devani, citing a lack of evidence and difficulty obtaining testimony from witnesses. The former energy minister, Kiraitu Murungi, who had ordered the initial 2009 investigation, was considered a crucial witness but was no longer willing to testify. In addition, the court was unable to locate the complainant who had originally brought the case. A 2025 application to restart the trial was rejected.

== See also ==
- Anglo-Leasing Scandal
- 2009 Kenyan Maize Scandal
