= Kenya Anti-Corruption Commission =

Government body

The Kenya Anti-Corruption Commission (KACC) was established in April 2003 to replace the Kenya Anti-Corruption Authority after Parliament enacted new legislation.

== Legal framework ==
The legislation enacted to establish the commission was:

- The Anti-Corruption and Economic Crimes Act (ACECA) No. 3 of 2003
- The Public Officer Ethics Act, No 4 of 2003.

These two legislations became operational on 2 May 2003. Section 70 of the (ACECA) repealed the Prevention of Corruption Act (Cap. 65). The Anti-Corruption and Economic Crimes Act established the Kenya Anti-Corruption Commission (KACC) as a body corporate, prescribing its composition and conferring powers and functions to it.

The Act also established the Kenya Anti-Corruption Advisory Board, an unincorporated body comprising persons nominated by a cross-section of stakeholders. The Advisory Board made recommendations for appointment of a Director and Assistant Directors. It also advised the Commission generally on the exercise of its powers and performance of its functions under the Act.

== Initial directors ==
The first Director was Justice (Rtd.) Aaron G. Ringera. The three Assistant Directors appointed were Ms. Fatuma Sichale (Deputy Director and Legal Services), Dr. John P. Mutonyi (Investigations and Asset Tracing), and Dr. Smokin Wanjala (Preventive Services). They formally took office on 10 September 2004. Mr. Wilson Shollei would later be appointed to the vacant position of Assistant Director Finance and Administration.

== Change of directorship ==
Following parliamentary pressure in July 2011, Justice Ringera was forced to resign from office together with Ms. Sichale and Dr. Wanjala, paving way for appointment of Prof. PLO Lumumba to take office in September 2011. Prof. Jane Onsongo (Preventive Services) and Mr. Pravin Bowry (Legal Services) joined the existing team of Dr. Mutonyi and Wilson Shollei as KACC assistant directors.

== See also ==
- Corruption in Kenya
- Kenya Anti-Corruption Authority
- Ethics and Anti-Corruption Commission
