= 2009 Kenyan Maize Scandal =

This was a scandal in Kenya that became public in January 2009, over the sale of imported maize. In late 2008, the ban on importation of maize was lifted by the government to allow capable businessmen to import maize to supplement the local produce that was short of the minimum required to satisfy the local market.

In early 2009 after parliamentary debate on a maize scandal, William Ruto was accused of illegally selling maize by Ikolomani MP Bonny Khalwale (Public Accounts Committee chairman). All the documents bearing the National Cereals and Produce Board seal that linked Ruto to the illegal sale of maize were accepted by Parliament’s deputy speaker.

The scandal alleges that the following events might have taken place:

- Briefcase millers, existing only on paper, some of whom were defunct at the time when the scandal unfolded, were awarded large quantities of maize by the Strategic Grain Reserve. They accomplished this by inflating their milling per-hour capacity and having four Permanent Secretaries approve them.
- The briefcase millers and local businesses that were either awarded quotas by the SGR or awarded import permits by the NCPBK (the National Cereals Produce Board of Kenya) respectively might have also re-directed the bags of maize outside the country to avoid price controls stated by the government and thus make bigger profits.
- Some of the maize imported in 2009 by local businesses was certified unfit for human consumption and might have been released into the market after directions of senior government officials.

The following ministries and departments as have been implicated:

- Ministry of Agriculture – The PS in this ministry was a signatory to the SGR quota allocations.
- Ministry of Special Programmes – The PS in this ministry was a signatory to the SGR quota allocations.
- Ministry of Finance & Treasury department – The PS in this ministry was a signatory to the SGR quota allocations.
- Ministry of the Prime Minister – The PS in this ministry was a signatory to the SGR quota allocations. The Office of the Prime Minister also gave instructions not to return the contaminated maize back to South Africa and was retained in Kenya to be destroyed.

The Kenya Anti-Corruption Commission is currently investigating the scandal but is yet to make an official report on its findings.

== See also ==
- National Cereals and Produce Board scandal
- National Youth Service scandal
- 2009 Triton Oil Scandal
