= List of ministers of Kenya =

This is a list of ministers of Kenya.

These ministers were appointed into office by the presidents that have served in Kenya since Kenya gained independence in 1963. Although the first three presidents appointed ministers and had them assume their roles immediately, Kenya's new Constitution (2010) introduced the vetting of the appointed ministers by the Parliament before being confirmed into their posts.

The following are the ministers and cabinet secretaries since 1963 and their respective dockets.

== Office of the Prime Minister ==
=== Prime Minister of Kenya ===
- Jomo Kenyatta (1963–1964)
- Raila Amolo Odinga (2008–2013)

=== Deputy Prime Minister of Kenya ===
- Wycliffe Musalia Mudavadi (2008–2013)
- Uhuru Kenyatta (2008–2013) – second DPM, following the 2008 power-sharing agreement between President Mwai Kibaki and Raila Odinga.

=== Minister of State office of the Prime Minister ===
- Joseph Murumbi (1963)

== Office of the President ==
In the Office of the President, Ministers of State include:

=== Provincial Administration and National Security ===
- Godfrey Gitahi Kariuki (1978–1982)
- Nahashon Kanyi Waithaka (1990–1992)
- Christopher Murungaru (2003–2005)
- John Michuki (2006–2008)
- George Saitoti (2008–2012)

=== Defence ===
- Dr. Njoroge Mungai (1966)
  - Reappointed in 1965
- James Gichuru (1969–1982)
- Njenga Karume (2006?–2008)
- Mohamed Yusuf Haji (2008–2013)
- Raychelle Omamo (2013–2020)
- Monica Juma (2020–2021)
- Eugene Wamalwa (2021–2022)
- Aden Duale (2022–2024)
- Soipan Tuya (2024–present, as of October 2026)

=== Special Programmes ===
- Naomi Shabaan (2008–2010)
- Abdisalam Eydarus

=== Minister of State ===
- Mbiyu Koinange (1966)
- James Nyamweya (1965)
  - Reappointed in 1966

== Office of the Vice President ==
The Deputy President of Kenya office has been held by the following:

- Jaramogi Oginga Odinga (1964–1965)
  - Appointed Minister without portfolio in 1965
- Joseph Murumbi (1965–1967)
- Daniel arap Moi (1967–1978)
- Mwai Kibaki (1978–1988)
- Josephat Karanja (1988)
- George Saitoti (1988–1997, 1998–2002)
- Wycliffe Musalia Mudavadi (2002)
- Michael Kijana Wamalwa (2003–2004)
- Moody Awori (2004–2007)
- Kalonzo Musyoka (2007–2012)
- William Ruto (2013–2022)
- Rigathi Gachagua (2022—2024)
- Kithure Kindiki (2024–present, as of October 2026)

=== Home Affairs ===
In the Office of the Vice President, the Ministry of Home Affairs has had the following Ministers of State:

- Jaramogi Oginga Odinga (1963)
- Daniel arap Moi (1965)
  - Reappointed in 1966
- Najib Balala

=== National Heritage ===
In the Office of the Vice President, the Ministry of National Heritage has had the following Ministers of State:

- William Ole Ntimama

=== Immigration and Registration of Persons ===
In the Office of the Vice President, the Ministry of Immigration and Registration of Persons has had the following Ministers of State:

- Otieno Kajwang

== External Affairs ==
=== Ministry of East African and Regional Cooperation ===
- John Koech
- Amason Kingi Jeffa (2008–2010)

=== Minister of State (Pan African Affairs) ===
- Mbiyu Koinange (1963)

== Governance and Internal Affairs ==
=== Ministry of Justice, National Cohesion and Constitutional Affairs ===
- Douglas mogere

=== Ministry of Local Government and Regional Affairs ===
- Samuel Onyango Ayodo (1963)
- Lawrence George Sagini (1965)
  - Reappointed in 1966

== Commerce and Economy ==
=== Ministry of Economic Planning and Development ===
- Tom Mboya (1966)
  - Reappointed in 1965

=== Ministry of Commerce and Industry ===
- Dr. Julius Gikonyo Kiano (1963)
- Eliud Ngala Mwendwa (1965) – Commerce, Industry and Co-operative Development
- Mwai Kibaki (1966)
- Arthur Magugu (1988–1992) – Ministry of Commerce and Industry
- Francis Masakhalia (1998) – Ministry of Industrial Development
- Mukhisa Kituyi (2003–2007) – Minister for Trade and Industry
- Adan Mohammed (2013–2019) – Industrialization and Enterprise Development
- Peter Munya (2019–2020) – Ministry of Trade and Industrialization
- Betty Maina (2020–2022) – Ministry of Trade and Industrialization
- Moses Kuria (2022–2024) – Ministry of Investment, Trade and Industry (MITI)
- Lee Kinyanjui (2024–current, as of October 2026) – Ministry of Investment, Trade and Industry (MITI)
- Andrew Omanga (Industry)
- Eliud Mwamunga
- Prof. Jonathan Ng'eno

=== Ministry of Investment, Trade and Industry (MITI) ===
- Salim Mvurya (Appointed, awaits parliament's approval)
- Rebecca Miano (2023–2024) – Ministry of Investment, Trade and Industry (MITI)
- Moses Kuria (2022–2023) – Ministry of Investment, Trade and Industry (MITI)
- Abubakar Hassan Abubakar – Principal Secretary, State Department for Investment Promotion

=== Ministry of Co-operative Development and Marketing ===
- Ronald Ngala (1966) – Co-operatives and Social Services
- Kamwithi Munyi
- Peter Njeru Ndwiga
- Joseph Nyagah

== Infrastructure ==
=== Ministry of Energy ===
- Eliud Ngala Mwendwa (1966) – Power and Communications
- J Nyamweya (1968–1969) – Power and Communications
- Ronald Ngala (1970–1972) – Power and Communications
- Isaac Omolo Okero (1973–1979) – Power and Communications
- Munya Waiyaki (1980)
- J. H. Okwanyo (1981–1982)
- Gilbert Kabere M'mbijiwe (1983)
- Nicholas Biwott (1984–1985) – Energy and Regional Development
  - Appointed again in 1990
- Darius Msagha Mbela (1996)
- Kirugi Laiboni M’Mukindia (1997)
- Chris Okemo (1998–2000)
- Francis Lotodo (2000)
- Francis Masakhalia (2001)
- Raila Odinga (2001–2002)
- Simeon Nyachae
- Henry Obwocha (2006)
- Kiraitu Murungi
- Charles Keter (2015–2021)

=== Ministry of Works ===
- Dawson Mwanyumba (1963) – Works, Communications and Power
  - Reappointed in 1965
  - Reappointed in 1966
- T. K. Mibei (1990) – Public Works
- William Cheruiyot Morogo (2000–2002) – Roads and Public Works

=== Ministry of Information and Communication ===
- Achieng Oneko (1963) – Information, Broadcasting and Tourism
  - Reappointed in 1965 – Information and Broadcasting
- James Charles Nakhwanga Osogo (1966) – Information and Broadcasting
- Raphael Tuju
- Mutahi Kagwe
- Samuel Poghisio
- Dr. Fred Okengo Matiangi
- Robert Stanley Matano – Information and Broadcasting
- Joseph Mucheru (2015) – ICT, Innovation and Youth Affairs

== Social Services ==
=== Ministry of Labour and Human Resource Development ===
- Eluid Ngala Mwendwa (1963) – Labour and Social Services
- Dr. Julius Gikonyo Kiano (1965) – Ministry of Labour
  - Reappointed in 1966
- Peter Fredrick Kibisu (1970s –?) James Nyamweya, ouko, okondo, mwangale, titus mbithi, ngutu, balala, mwakwere
- Newton Kulundu (2003–2007)
- John Munyes
- James Orengo
- Kazungu Kambi
- Ukur Yattani (2017–2020)

=== Ministry of Gender, Sports, Culture and Social Services ===
- Najib Balala (2002–2003)
- Ochilo Ayacko (2003–2005)
- Maina Kamanda (2005–2007)
- Esther Murugi Mathenge (2008–2009)
- Naomi Shaaban (2009–2013)
- Rashid Mohammed (2013–2018)
- Amina J. Mohammed (2018–?)

=== Ministry of Housing and Social Services ===
- Taaita Toweett (1961) – Minister of Labour and Housing
- Taaita Toweett (1962) – Minister of Lands, Survey & Town Planning
- Paul Ngei (1965)
- Taaita Toweett (1974) – Minister of Housing and Social Services

=== Ministry of Health ===
- Bernard Mate (1961–1963)
- Dr. Njoroge Mungai (1963) – Health and Housing
- Joseph David Otiende (1965)
  - Reappointed in 1966
- Samuel Ole Tipis (1963–?)
- Mwai Kibaki (1988–1991)
- Charity Kaluki Ngilu (2003–2007)

(Ministry divided into Ministries of Public Health and Medical Services upon formation of Grand Coalition government in 2008)

==== Ministry of Public Health ====
- Beth Wambui Mugo

==== Ministry of Medical Services ====
- Peter Anyang Nyong'o
- Cleopa Kilonzo Mailu (2013–2017)
- Sicily Kariuki (2018–2020)
- Mutahi Kagwe (2020–2022)
- Susan Nakhumicha Wafula (2022–Present)

=== Ministry of Research, Science and Technology ===
- Wilson Ndolo Ayah (1987)

=== Ministry of Education, Science and Technology ===
- Daniel arap Moi (1962)
- Joseph Daniel Otiende (1963)
- Jeremiah J. M. Nyagah (1966)
- Mbiyu Koinange (1965)
- Taaitta Toweett (1961–1979) – Minister for Labour & Housing and Minister for Education
- Peter Oloo-Aringo (1985–1991)
- George Saitoti (2003–2006)
- Noah Wekesa (2006–2007?)

(Ministry of Higher Education, Science and Technology was created out of the Ministry of Education upon the creation of Grand Coalition in 2008)

==== Ministry of Education ====
- William Ruto (2009–2011)
- Mutula Kilonzo (2012–2013)
- Jacob Kaimenyi (2013–2015)
- Fred Matiang'i (2016–2017)
- Amina Mohammed (2018)
- Paul Warinda – Chief Officer, Ministry of Education, Science and Technology
- George Magoha (2018–2022)

== Natural Resource Management ==
=== Ministry of Lands and Settlement ===
- Jackson Angaine (1963) – Lands and Settlement
  - Reappointed in 1965
  - Reappointed in 1966
- GG Kariuki (1982–1985?)
- Amos Kimunya (2002–2006?)
- James Orengo (2008–2012)
- Charity Kaluki Ngilu (2013–2015)
- Farida Karoney (2018–present, as of October 2026)

=== Ministry of Environment and Natural Resources ===
- Lawrence George Sagini (1963) – Lands, Game, Fisheries, Water and Natural Resources
- Samuel Onyango Ayodo (1965) – Natural Resources and Tourism
- C. M. G. Argwings-Kodhek (1966)
- William Odongo Omamo (1982) – Environment and Natural Resources
- Joseph Kamotho (2002)
- Stephen Kalonzo Musyoka
- Kivutha Kibwana
- John Njoroge Michuki (2008–2012)

=== Ministry of Tourism ===
- Samuel Onyango Ayodo (1966) – Tourism and Wildlife
- Karisa Maitha (2002–2004) – Tourism and Wildlife
- Najib Balala
- Peninah Malonza (2022)

=== Ministry of Livestock and Fisheries Development ===
- Dr. Appolling Mukasa Mango (1981)
- Joseph Konzolo Munyao
- Charles Murgor – Assistant Minister Livestock Development (1981)
- Mohammed Kuti (2008–2013)

== See also ==
- Cabinet of Kenya
- Department of Justice (Kenya)
- Ministry of Finance (Kenya)
- Ministry of Information and Communication
- Ministry of Health (Kenya)
- Ministry of Education, Science and Technology
- Ministry of Agriculture (Kenya)
