= The Kennedy Airlift =

Program to support Kenyan students in North America

The Kennedy Airlift was a program that brought hundreds of students from East Africa to study in the United States and Canada between 1959 to 1963. Kenyan Tom Mboya and the African-American Students Foundation (AASF) started the program to allow promising Kenyan students to receive college and university educations in the United States and Canada, and was supported by many North American educational institutions, foundations, and individuals including Harry Belafonte, Jackie Robinson, Sidney Poitier, and Martin Luther King Jr. It got its popular nickname in September 1960 when Senator John F. Kennedy in a close presidential campaign arranged a $100,000 donation from the Joseph P. Kennedy Jr Foundation to cover airfare for the autumn 1960 group of East African students just as the program was running out of funds.

== Background ==
The program began in earnest in 1959, when Tom Mboya embarked on a speaking tour of the United States to seek scholarships for students from East Africa. The first batch of 81 students touched down in New York City on September 11, 1959. They would be settled in various universities in the United States and Canada. In Kenya, Mboya liaised with Julius Kiano and Kariuki Njiiri to identify potential students for the airlifts. Both Kiano and Njiiri were alumni of US universities.

The airlifts were opposed by Britain, which did not want American meddling with any of its colonies, one of which was Kenya. British officials spread propaganda among top Kenyan students that American education was inferior to British education.

== Legacy ==
The airlifts officially ended in 1963. Most of the graduates from American and Canadian colleges and universities went back to help build the newly-independent Kenya. Some were employed even before they had graduated, mainly in the public administration sector as district and provincial officers. Men found it easy to get jobs for which they qualified, but women faced a tougher challenge since they were offered secretarial duties despite being better qualified than most male officers in the same departments. However, the inclusion of women demonstrated foresight on the part of the airlift organizers. One of these women, Wangari Maathai, later won the Nobel Peace Prize, and another, Leah Marangu, later become the first female head of a university in Africa.

== Notable beneficiaries ==
Over 800 students, mainly from Kenya, benefited from the Kennedy Airlift. Notable recipients include Kenya's Wangari Maathai, the first African female and first environmentalist to win the Nobel Prize; Mahmoud Mamdani, a prominent Ugandan academic listed in the top 100 list of public intellectuals by Prospect Magazine; and George Saitoti, a former vice president of Kenya. Other notable recipients include

=== Academia and education ===
- Prof. Leah Marangu (Former Vice Chancellor of African Nazarene University)
- Prof. Mahmoud Mamdani (Prominent Ugandan author and academic. Director of Makerere Institute of Social Research)
- Prof. Miriam Were (Chancellor, Moi University. Winner of the Hideyo Noguchi Africa Prize)

=== Diplomatic service ===
- Pamela Odede Mboya (Former Kenyan representative to UN Habitat)
- Hon. Simon Thuo Kairo (First Kenyan ambassador to China)
- Prof. Washington Aggrey Okumu (Kenyan diplomat, economist and politician)

=== Environmentalism and conservationism ===
- Hon. Wangari Maathai (First African female and first environmentalist Nobel Prize winner)

=== Journalism, writing and media ===
- Maina wa Kinyatti (Kenyan Author and Mau Mau historian. Winner of the PEN freedom to write award)

=== Politics, trade unionism and civil rights ===
- Hon. Arthur Magugu (Kenyan politician and former cabinet minister)
- Prof. George Saitoti (Mathematician. Former Vice President of Kenya)
- Hon. Ochola Ogaye Mak'Anyengo (Kenyan trade unionist and politician)
- Hon. Wilson Ndolo Ayah (Kenyan politician and former cabinet minister)
- Dr. Zachary Onyonka (Kenyan politician and former cabinet minister)
- Hon. Maina Wanjigi (James Maina) (Kenyan politician and former cabinet minister)

=== Science, technology and medicine ===
- Prof. Miriam Were (Prominent A.I.D.S. researcher. Chancellor, Moi University. Winner of the Hideyo Noguchi Africa Prize)
- Dr. Ng'endo Mwangi (First Kenyan female physician. First black African student at Smith College in Massachusetts and the Albert Einstein College of Medicine in New York)
- Prof Reuben Olembo (Kenyan scientist and environmentalist. Former Deputy Director of UNEP)

== Barack Obama Sr. ==
Contrary to some media reports, Barack Obama Sr., the first husband of Stanley Ann Dunham and father of Barack Obama II, was not a direct beneficiary of the airlifts. Instead, inspired by the airlift program, he applied to various American universities and received private funding to attend the University of Hawaii. He also received funding from the African American Students Foundation (AASF) with the help of Mboya and so was part of the so-called "airlift generation".
