= Gecaga =

Gecaga is a surname. Notable people with the surname include:

- Jemimah Gecaga (1920–1979), Kenyan politician
- Nana Gecaga (born 1978), Kenyan businesswoman
