= Ngethe Njoroge =

Kenyan journalist and diplomat (1928–2023)

Kenyan High Commissioner to the United Kingdom
- In office 1970–1979
- Preceded by: Josephat Karanja
- Succeeded by: Shadrack Kimalel

Personal details
- Born: 10 November 1928 Colony and Protectorate of Kenya
- Died: 24 December 2023 (aged 95)
- Spouse: Mary Morello (divorced)
- Children: 4, including Tom Morello
- Parents: George Segeni Njoroge (father); Leah Magana (mother)
- Relatives: Njoroge Mungai (brother); Jemimah Gecaga (sister); Jomo Kenyatta (cousin)
- Education: BSc Central State College; MSc Boston University

Ng'ethe Njoroge (10 November 1928 – 24 December 2023) was a Kenyan journalist and diplomat. In 1970, Njoroge assumed the role of Kenyan High Commissioner to the United Kingdom, a position he held until 1979. He was married to Mary Morello, with whom he had one child, the musician Tom Morello of Rage Against the Machine.

== Biography ==
Njoroge was born to a Kikuyu family in the Colony of Kenya. His parents, Leah Magana and George Segeni Njoroge, were pioneer Christians who attended the Church of the Torch which had been founded by the famous Church of Scotland minister, John William Arthur. The news and entertainment site Tuko has alleged that the elder Njoroge was born an ethnic Masai but changed his name from Segeni ole Mbuchucha to the Kikuyu name Njoroge. The elder Njoroge worked as a cook at a Presbyterian mission in Nairobi and later opened a store and a transport company. Njoroge has five brothers and one sister. His sister, Jemimah Gecaga (1920–1979), was the first female member of parliament in Kenya and his brother was Kenyan Cabinet Minister and Member of Parliament Njoroge Mungai (1926–2014). His cousin, Jomo Kenyatta, was the first elected president in Kenya.

Njoroge attended Alliance High School in Kikuyu, Kenya and Busoga University in Iganga, Uganda before moving to the United States where he attended Central State College in Wilberforce, Ohio and then in 1960 he went to Boston University where he received a M.S. in journalism in 1961.

According to an interview with his son, American guitarist Tom Morello, Njoroge was involved in the Mau Mau Uprising for Kenyan independence (1952–1960). Morello said in the same interview that his anti-authoritarian viewpoints are inspired by the involvement of his father in the uprising.

== Career ==
After the ascension of his cousin, Jomo Kenyatta, to the presidency, Njoroge held a number of positions in his government. He was named assistant secretary, Ministry of Lands and Settlements (1963–1964); senior assistant secretary, Ministry of Foreign Affairs (1964); delegate to the Organisation of African Unity (1964); member of the Delegation to the Commonwealth Heads of Government Meeting (1964); member of the Kenyan Delegation to the United Nations General Assembly (1964, 1965, 1966); head of the Africa and Middle East Division of the Ministry of Foreign Affairs in Nairobi (1964–1967); counselor of the Kenyan Embassy in Bonn, Germany (1968–1970); Ambassador to Italy and Switzerland (1974); and Kenyan High Commissioner to the United Kingdom (1970–1978).

== Personal life ==
Njoroge married teacher and activist Mary Morello; they had one son, Rage Against the Machine guitarist Tom Morello. They were divorced a year after their son was born. When Morello was 16 months old, Njoroge returned to Kenya, he later remarried and had three more sons.

Ngethe Njoroge died on 24 December 2023, at the age of 95.
