= George Saitoti =

6th Vice President of Kenya

Honourable George Saitoti E.G.H.
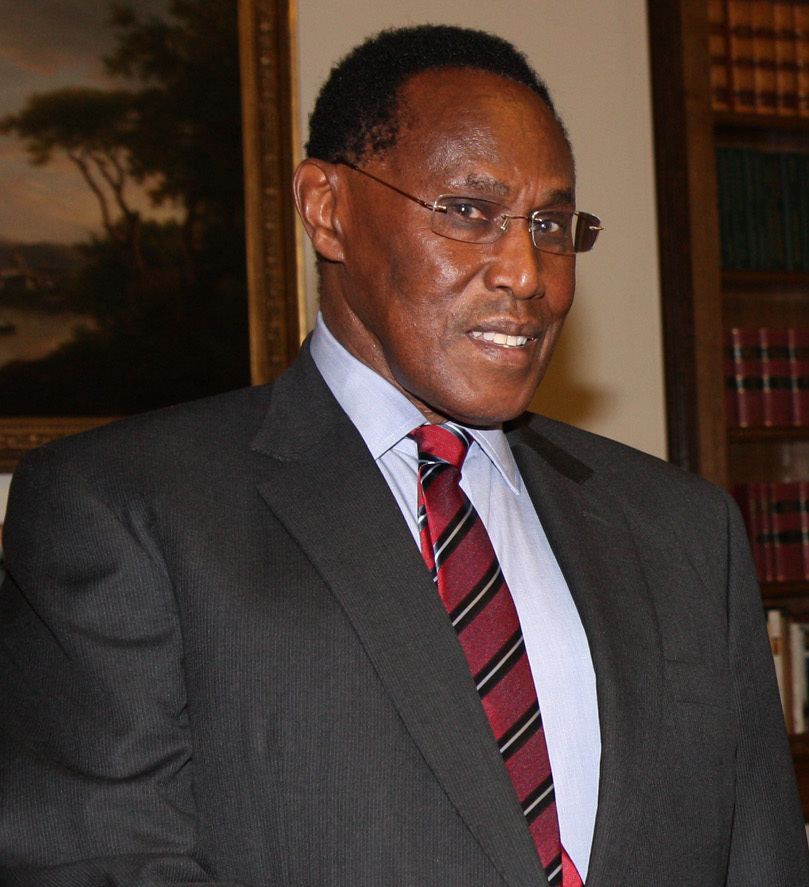

6th Vice-President of Kenya
- In office 1 June 1989 – 28 August 2002
- President: Daniel arap Moi
- Preceded by: Josephat Karanja
- Succeeded by: Musalia Mudavadi

Minister of State for Internal Security and Provincial Administration
- In office 8 January 2008 – 10 June 2012
- President: Mwai Kibaki
- Prime Minister: Raila Odinga
- Preceded by: John Michuki
- Succeeded by: Mohamed Yusuf Haji (Acting)

Minister of Education
- In office 3 January 2003 – 8 January 2008
- President: Mwai Kibaki
- Preceded by: Henry Kosgey
- Succeeded by: Sam Ongeri

Minister of Finance
- In office 1988–1993
- President: Daniel arap Moi
- Preceded by: Arthur Magugu
- Succeeded by: Musalia Mudavadi

Member of Parliament
- In office April 1988 – 10 June 2012
- Preceded by: Philip Odupoy
- Succeeded by: Moses Ole Sakuda
- Constituency: Kajiado North Constituency

Personal details
- Born: George Musengi Saitoti; 1945 Maasailand, Kenya
- Died: 10 June 2012 (aged 66–67) Kibiku Forest, near Ngong, Kajiado District, Kenya.
- Resting place: Kitengela, Kajiado County.
- Party: KANU (1988–2002); NARC (2002–2007); PNU (2008-2012)
- Other political affiliations: United Democratic Front (Kenya)
- Spouse: Margaret Saitoti
- Relations: Ronald Saitoti (brother); Penny Musengi (niece)
- Children: Zachary Musengi
- Parents: Zacharia Kiarie (father); Zipporah Gathoni (mother)
- Education: Brandeis University; University of Sussex; University of Warwick
- Occupation: Politician
- Profession: Businessman; economist; mathematician

George Musengi Saitoti, E.G.H. (3 August 1945 – 10 June 2012) was a Kenyan politician, businessman and American- and British-trained economist, mathematician and development policy thinker.

As a mathematician, Saitoti served as head of the Mathematics Department at the University of Nairobi, pioneered the founding of the African Mathematical Union and served as its vice-president from 1976 to 1979.

As an economist, Saitoti served as the executive chairman of the World Bank and the International Monetary Fund (IMF) in 1990–91, and as President of the African Caribbean and Pacific (ACP) Group of States in 1999–2000, at the crucial phase of re-negotiating the new development partnership agreement to replace the expired Lomé Convention between the ACP bloc and the European Union (EU). His book The Challenges of Economic and Institutional Reforms in Africa influenced practical policy directions on an array of areas during the turbulent 1980s and 1990s.

Saitoti joined politics as a nominated Member of Parliament and Minister for Finance in 1983, rising to become Kenya's longest-serving Vice-President, a proficient Minister for education, Internal Security and Provincial Administration and Foreign Affairs. Few recognise him as a "reformist", but his recommendations as the chair of the KANU Review Committee, popularly known as the "Saitoti Committee" in 1990–91, opened KANU to internal changes and set the stage for the repeal of Section 2A and Kenya's return to pluralist democracy. Saitoti left KANU and joined the opposition, becoming a kingpin figure in the negotiations that led to the "NARC Revolution" in 2002. As Minister for Internal Security and Provincial Administration, Acting Minister for Foreign Affairs and key member of the National Security Advisory Committee (NSAC), he later worked closely with the national Ministry of Defense to see through the Operation Linda Nchi against the Al-Shabaab insurgent group. In addition, rival factions had for decades invoked the infamous Goldenberg fraud to knock Saitoti out of politics, but the legal courts cleared him of the scandal in July 2006. Saitoti's dual heritage as a Maasai with Kikuyu family members predisposed him to a pan-Kenyan vision, but also denied him a strong ethnic base unlike his competitors. Saitoti was running as a candidate to succeed President Mwai Kibaki when he died in a helicopter crash in 2012.

== Early life and education ==
George Saitoti attended Ololua Primary School, Kajiado where he acquired his basic education in the 1950s. Between 1960 and 1963, he secured a place at Mang'u High School in Thika where he attained his high school education. He joined the ranks of Mang'u High School's highly decorated alumni, including Kenya's third president, Mwai Kibaki, former vice-president Moody Awori, Catholic archbishop Ndingi Mwana-a-Nzeki, the late environment minister John Michuki, the late trade unionist and former minister for justice and constitutional affairs, Tom Mboya, and late cardinal Maurice Michael Otunga.

Saitoti was one of the recipients of the Kennedy Airlift scholarships in 1963 at the age of 18. This was a scholarship program started by Tom Mboya and William X. Scheinmann and supported by the John F. Kennedy foundation and the African American Students Association to address the educational needs of newly independent Kenya. Through this program, hundreds of East Africans studied in the United States of America and Canada. Saitoti studied at Brandeis University between 1963 and 1967 where he was a mathematician. During his time there, he was on the Wien Scholarship, specialising in Mathematics and Economics. His colleagues at the time remember that he enjoyed spending time in Cholmondeleys (the coffeehouse in the Castle) and excelled at high jump, ranking as one of the best in New England. In 1988, Saitoti received the first Brandeis Alumni Achievement Award, the highest honour the university bestows upon its graduates.

Saitoti later moved to the United Kingdom where he acquired a Master of Science (MSc) degree in mathematics from the University of Sussex, Brighton. He enrolled for his doctoral studies at the University of Warwick where he acquired his PhD in mathematics in 1972; writing his dissertation under the supervision of professor Luke Hodgkin in the area of algebraic topology under the topic: Mod-2 K-Theory of the Second Iterated Loop Space on a Sphere.

== Academic career ==
Upon his graduation, Saitoti returned to Kenya in 1972, commencing a career as a Mathematics lecturer at the University of Nairobi. One of his contributions was the institutionalisation of Mathematics as a discipline in Africa. During the first Pan-African Conference of Mathematicians held in Rabat, Morocco, in 1976, Saitoti was involved in the creation of the African Mathematical Union (AMU). He was elected the AMU's vice-president, a post which he held on up to 1979. By 1983, Saitoti's academic career was on the rise as associate professor and Head of the Mathematics Department. Outside the academy, Saitoti received several public appointments. On 3 November 1972, the Minister of Labour appointed him as the chairman of the Agricultural Wages Council (AWC). On 4 September 1979, the Minister for Tourism and Wildlife, John Ogutu, also appointed him as a committee member of the Natural Sciences Advisory Research Committee (TNSARC) chaired by professor S. O. Wandiga. In September 1983, he was appointed chairperson of the board of directors for the Rift Valley Institute of Science and Technology. He also served in other public capacities as chairman of Mumias Sugar Company and the Kenya Commercial Bank.

=== Development thinker ===
Top decision-makers in government had recognised Saitoti as a policy thinker and technocrat, of whom the KANU desperately needed to fix its institutions, politics and the economy. His seminal book, The Challenges of Economic and Institutional Reforms in Africa was widely praised by leading officials as providing practical policy proposals to deal with the various challenges facing Kenya and Africa. The book drew from Saitoti's experience as a seasoned scholar, consultant and experienced policy-maker/thinker, presenting a rigorous and multidisciplinary analysis of strategies for poverty alleviation, sustainable development, poverty reduction, combating HIV/AIDS and peace diplomacy. Saitoti also emphasised the importance of institutional reforms and sound public policies to sustainable economic growth in Africa.

== Political career ==
Long before joining mainstream politics, Saitoti had a stint in the legislative duties. From 1974 to 1977, he represented Kenya in the defunct (since-revived) East African Community as a member of the East African Legislative Assembly.

=== Dual ancestry and politics of diversity ===
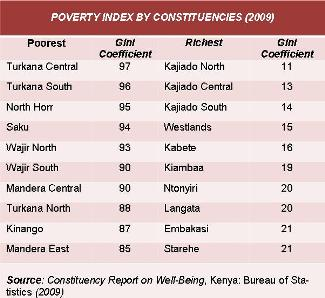
Kenya Poverty Index by Constituency 2009

In October 1983, President Daniel arap Moi nominated Saitoti as a member of parliament and subsequently appointed him to the Cabinet as Minister for Finance. He held the position until 1989. During the 1988 general elections, Saitoti entered competitive politics and won the Kajiado North parliamentary seat that was previously held by Philip Odupoy. Prior to the tenure of Adupoy and Saitoti, the Kajiado North multi-ethnic constituency was held by the popular politician, John Keen, another half-Maasai who champion a nationalist vision and worked over the years to ensure the advancement of his mother's people. For more than 25 years, professor George Saitoti has represented Kajiado North since 1988, recapturing the seat in consecutive elections in 1992, 1997, 2002 and 2007. Building on John Keen's legacy of a cosmopolitan constituency, Saitoti transformed Kajiado North into Kenya's most ethnically integrated multi-ethnic legislative area that also provided a safe haven to Kenyans, forcibly displaced by the 1991–2008 cycles of ethnic violence in neighbouring areas.

The area is also ranked among the top ten wealthiest, economically dynamic and fastest growing regions in Kenya. According to figures released by the Government of Kenya in 2009, Kajiado North has had an average poverty index of 10.66 per cent for the last three years, making it one of the richest constituencies in Kenya (see table 1).

=== Kenya's sixth vice-president ===
After the 1988 General Election, President Moi appointed Saitoti as Kenya's sixth vice-president. Saitoti became Kenya's longest-sitting vice-president serving for 13 years under President Daniel arap Moi between May 1989 and January 1998 and again between April 1999 and August 2002 (see table 2). At the same time, he served as minister for finance. In 1990–1991, Saitoti was the executive chairman of the World Bank and the International Monetary Fund (IMF). In 1999–2000, Saitoti also served as president of the African, Caribbean and Pacific Group of States, becoming instrumental in helping negotiate a new development partnership agreement to succeed the previous Lomè Convention that expired in February 2000 between the ACP and the European Union. The hallmarks of Saitoti tenure as vice-president were efficiency, sobriety and loyalty as President Moi's most trusted lieutenant. Even when President Moi dithered in naming a new deputy after the 1997 elections, Saitoti was still his favoured choice 14 months down the line. The same traits of efficiency, patience and loyalty would make him one of President Mwai Kibaki's trusted Ministers.

=== Reforming KANU'S one-party system ===
When Saitoti was appointed vice-president on 1 May 1989, KANU was back-pedaling on re-democratizing the country. At the same time, the party was fragmented over the succession divide between a sit-tight "KANU-A" and a more pro-change "KANU-B" led by Saitoti. The new vice-president was, therefore, compelled to walk the tightrope between being the face of change in the ruling party and remaining loyal to his principal who, after re-election as president in 1988, had amended the constitution to increase his power to dismiss judges and widened police powers. On New Year's Day 1990, the vocal cleric Rev. Timothy Njoya called on all Africans to demand a multiparty system of government. Following the Saba Saba riots on 7 July 1990, President Moi announced the formation of the KANU Review Committee under the chairmanship of Prof George Saitoti, popularly known as the Saitoti Committee.

=== The Saitoti Review Committee ===
The Saitoti Review Committee was mandated to investigate the party's internal electoral and disciplinary conduct. The committee traversed the country collecting people's opinions on the party, astounding foe, friend and critics alike and offering a rare forum for direct criticism and outbursts. In January 1991, KANU's executive committee adopted the recommendation by George Saitoti, that critics of the party cease being expelled but suspended for one or two years.

The recommendations of the report were open for debate during the National Delegates Conference at Karasani in Nairobi. President Moi backed the adoption and implementation of the report in toto, against what many speakers at the conference had expected. This opened the reforms gates, eventually setting the stage for the repeal of Section 2A in 1991 that returned Kenya to back to a multiparty system of government. The Saitoti Review Committee thrust the party on the reform path, but also widened internal ideological schisms between "KANU-A" conservatives and "KANU-B" pro-reformers over the Moi succession question.

=== KANU'S war on Saitoti ===
Saitoti was in the eye of a nasty succession storm that rocked KANU before and after the 1997 elections. Maasai purists led by Minister William Ole Ntimama and senior Maasai elders 're-Kikuyunized' Saitoti's dual ancestry, amplifying his Kikuyu family linkages as a scheme to weaken his political base and to challenge his status as a Maasai elder. Despite his steadfast loyalty to KANU and President Moi, Saitoti was frequently ignored, humiliated and frustrated by the party and its top echelons. Around the same time Foreign Affairs Minister Robert Ouko was murdered in February 1990, Saitoti claims that attempts were made on his life. After the 1997 general elections, he was dropped as vice-president, although no replacement was appointed. Even as President Moi reappointed him in April 1999, on the roadside in Limuru, Kiambu he made a scathing remark to the effect that: "I've given back Prof Saitoti the seat of Vice-President, hopefully now your sufurias (pots) will be full of food." Months before the general elections of 2002, Saitoti's name was deleted from the list of KANU delegates and his ascendancy to the presidency blocked by 'unknown' party members. On 18 March 2002, when KANU held its national delegates conference at the Kasarani sports complex, the move to block Saitoti from the succession game was manifest. The meeting amended the party constitution to allow for the merger between KANU and Raila Odinga's National Development Party (NDP) to create the "New KANU". But it also introduced four new positions of party vice-chairmen primarily to water down Saitoti's position as vice-president and Moi's most likely successor as president.

=== The National Rainbow Coalition (NARC) ===
It was clear that Moi did not even want him as one of the four vice-chairmen posts reserved for Uhuru Kenyatta, Kalonzo Musyoka, Katana Ngala and Musalia Mudavadi. Moi told Saitoti to his face that he was not "presidential material". As a "Maasai-Kikuyu," Saitoti lacked the ethnic numbers he needed in the political horse-trading in Moi's power game. Instead, Moi finger-pointed as his heir Uhuru Kenyatta, perceived to have a large ethnic base as a pure-bred Kikuyu with the "Kenyatta" mystique. Saitoti gracefully bowed out of the race, living to fight another day, but not without his famous line: There comes a time when the nation is much more important than an individual. But the KANU-NDP marriage came to a tragic end when Moi named Uhuru rather than Raila Odinga as his successor. In August 2002, Odinga left KANU to defeat Moi's "use and dump game," and joined a group of KANU rebels" coalesced around the "Rainbow Alliance" lobby that later transformed itself into the Liberal Democratic Party (LDP). Saitoti also walking out of KANU and became a key LDP figure. In October 2002, LDP joined the National Alliance of Kenya (NAK) of Mwai Kibaki, Charity Ngilu and Wamalwa Kijana to form the National Rainbow Coalition (NARC). Saitoti became a member of the NARC Summit, the highest organ of the coalition.

== The "NARC revolution" ==
When the NARC flag-bearer, Mwai Kibaki, decisively defeated KANU and Uhuru Kenyatta, Saitoti was appointed to the Ministry of Education. He was the man in charge of implementing NARC's flagship and globally acclaimed free primary education in Kenya.

=== The Kibaki stalwart ===
After 2004, as the NARC consensus crumbled, Saitoti left the agitating LDP camp and threw his lot behind President Kibaki. He canvassed for the government-sponsored draft Constitution, which lost to a combined KANU-LDP campaign during the November 2005 referendum. During the 2007 elections, Saitoti defended his Kajiado North parliamentary seat on the Party of National Unity (PNU) ticket, Kibaki's re-election vehicle, launched three months to the election on 16 September 2007. The courts ordered a vote recount in Kajiado North, but Saitoti beat his closest competitor, Moses Ole Sakuda with close to 20,000 votes. Saitoti blamed his re-election glitch on intrigues of power by KANU forces within the PNU campaign which underwrote his rivals to knock him out of politics and potentially out of the 2012 Presidential elections. But he had remained reticent about it.

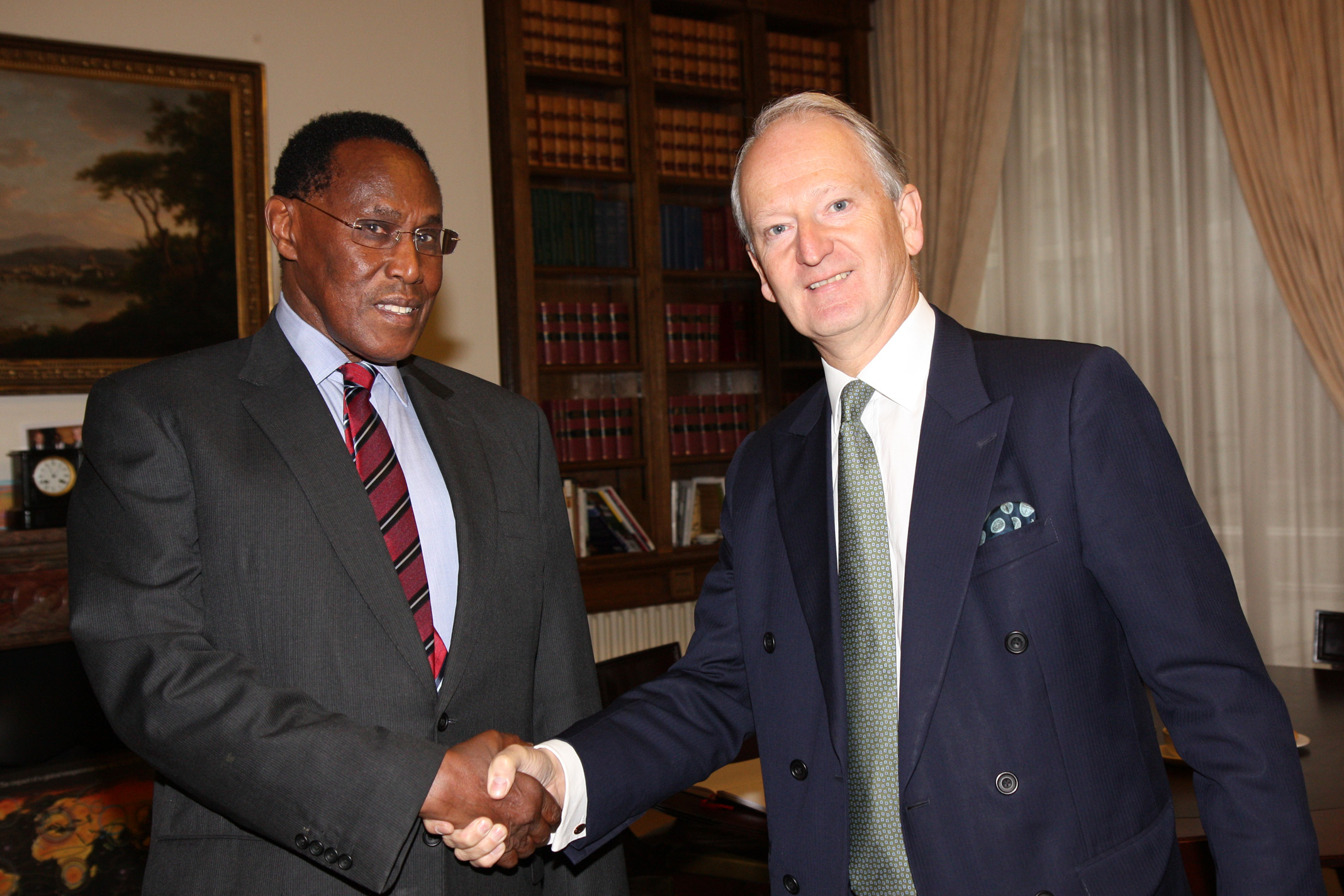
British Foreign Office Minister Henry Bellingham meeting George Saitoti, the Kenyan Minister of State for Provincial Administration & Internal Security in London, 21 November 2011

Saitoti's traits of patience, efficiency and loyalty to Kibaki paid off. On 8 January 2008, he was appointed Minister of State for Internal Security and Provincial Administration in the Office of the President, a position previously occupied by a Kibaki confidant, John Michuki. Saitoti retained the Internal Security docket even after President Kibaki and Prime Minister Raila Odinga established the power-sharing government that ended the 2008 post-election crisis. Between October 2010 and August 2011, Saitoti was appointed Minister for Foreign Affairs on an acting capacity after the incumbent, Moses Wetangula, stepped aside to allow investigations on alleged corruption.

=== Cabinet sub-committee on ICC ===
In July 2009, Saitoti was appointed to head a special cabinet sub-committee formed to oversee the affairs of the International Criminal Court (ICC) in Kenya. Members of this bi-partisan committee include; George Saitoti, Mutula Kilonzo and Moses Wetangula (PNU) and James Orengo, Otieno Kajwang and Amason Kingi (ODM). (Following a cabinet reshuffle in April 2012, Eugene Wamalwa and Prof. Sam Ongeri have replaced Kilonzo and Wetangula). The role of the sub-Committee as a liaison and co-ordination body between the ICC and the Kenyan government took a center-stage from December 2010 when the ICC Chief Prosecutor, Luis Moreno Ocampo, indicted six prominent Kenyans for alleged crimes against humanity relating to the 2008 post-election violence.

As the Minister of Internal Security and the chairman of the Cabinet Sub-committee on ICC on YouTube and security matters, Saitoti is the guarantor of the government's commitment to the ICC process. Arising from this, several analysts have claimed the suspects' fate lie with the sub-committee. Saitoti came out strongly criticising the invocation of President Kibaki in the ICC debate, calling for sobriety from politicians. Saitoti has maintained a legal interpretation on whether the suspects can vie for presidency in the coming elections, stressing that only the constitution can bar or let them free to enter the race.

=== PNU party politics ===
On 19 December 2008, President Mwai Kibaki who was unanimously endorsed as Party Leader at the PNU National Delegates Conference (NDC) held at Kasarani sports complex in Nairobi. In accordance with the Political Parties Act (2008), Saitoti was elected PNU chairman, becoming the second-in-command in the party hierarchy since he lost as KANU Vice-President in the battle for the Moi succession in March 2002. His elevation, however, complicated coalition politics and raised the stakes for the Kibaki succession in PNU. Other presidential hopefuls, Uhuru Kenyatta and Kalonzo Musyoka, shunned the party and embarked on consolidating their respective parties. In November 2010, Musyoka, Kenyatta and Saitoti signed a protocol to form and transform the PNU Alliance into a common political vehicle for the 2013 presidential race. But the imperative to comply with the Political Parties Act (2011) forced them to abandon the Alliance and shift attention to their respective parties.

== Goldenberg scandal ==
Saitoti was both Vice-President and Finance Minister at the height of the 1991–1993 Goldenberg scandal. Even though his own culpability in the fraud has never been established, for decades the Goldenberg has become the proverbial Sword of Damocles used against Saitoti in intra-elite power wars. In early 1999, Raila Odinga as a presidential contender to succeed Moi as president, sued Saitoti and others over alleged role in the Goldenberg scandal. Three months after his re-appointment as vice-president on 3 April 1999, Otieno Kajwang', a Raila ally, moved a private member's motion of no confidence in the vice-president for his alleged role in the Goldenberg fraud. Saitoti survived the onslaught.

The Goldenberg spectre returned to haunt Saitoti in the wake of the fierce political infighting between the LDP/KANU faction and Kibaki supporters in NARC that followed the 2005 referendum. On 3 February 2006 a report by the Goldenberg Commission of Inquiry, chaired by Justice Samuel Bosire, recommended that George Saitoti should face criminal charges for his involvement in the Goldenberg scandal. On 13 February 2006, Saitoti voluntarily stepped aside from his ministerial docket to pave way for investigations into the allegations. However, on 31 July 2006, a three-judge bench headed by Justice Joseph Nyamu issued a certiorari order clearing Prof Saitoti of any wrongdoing, expunging his name from the Bosire Commission Report and issuing an order on permanent stay of prosecution against Saitoti.

In dismissing the 23 paragraphs of the report, the High Court (Kenya) bench cited three inter-related errors of commission and omission by the Bosire Commission:

- The inquiry into the Goldenberg fraud had created a pyramid of noticeable bias, discriminatory treatment of evidence, submissions and factual errors that undermined the pursuit of justice and fairness.
- The factual flaws, biased and unprofessional handling of evidence by Inquiry led to wrong findings. The Inquiry's claim that Prof Saitoti illegally approved the 15 per cent ex-gratia payments as additional payment over and above the 20 per cent export compensation allowed at the time under the law were factually wrong. Indeed, the customs refunds, which Saitoti was accused of approving, were actually passed by Parliament.
- Long delay and wrong findings by the Goldenberg inquiry denied Prof. Saitoti any conceivable chance fair trial and justice.

On 15 November 2006, President Kibaki reappointed Saitoti back to Cabinet. In April 2012, the vetting board found Justice Samuel Bosire unfit to serve in the judiciary citing fails as the chairman of the Goldenberg Commission of Inquiry. He ignored a High Court Order to summon retired president Daniel arap Moi, Musalia Mudavadi and Nicholas Biwott as witnesses. The vetting board also accused Justice Nyamu of undermining public confidence in the courts for issuing a permanent stay of prosecution against Saitoti.

== Linda Nchi ==
Starting October 2011, Saitoti worked closely with national Minister of Defence Mohamed Yusuf Haji to see through Linda Nchi, a coordinated operation in southern Somalia between the Somali military and the Kenyan military against the Al-Shabaab group of insurgents. The mission was officially led by the Somali army, with the Kenyan forces providing a support role. In early June 2012, Haji signed another agreement re-hatting Kenya's deployed military forces in Somalia under the AMISOM general command.

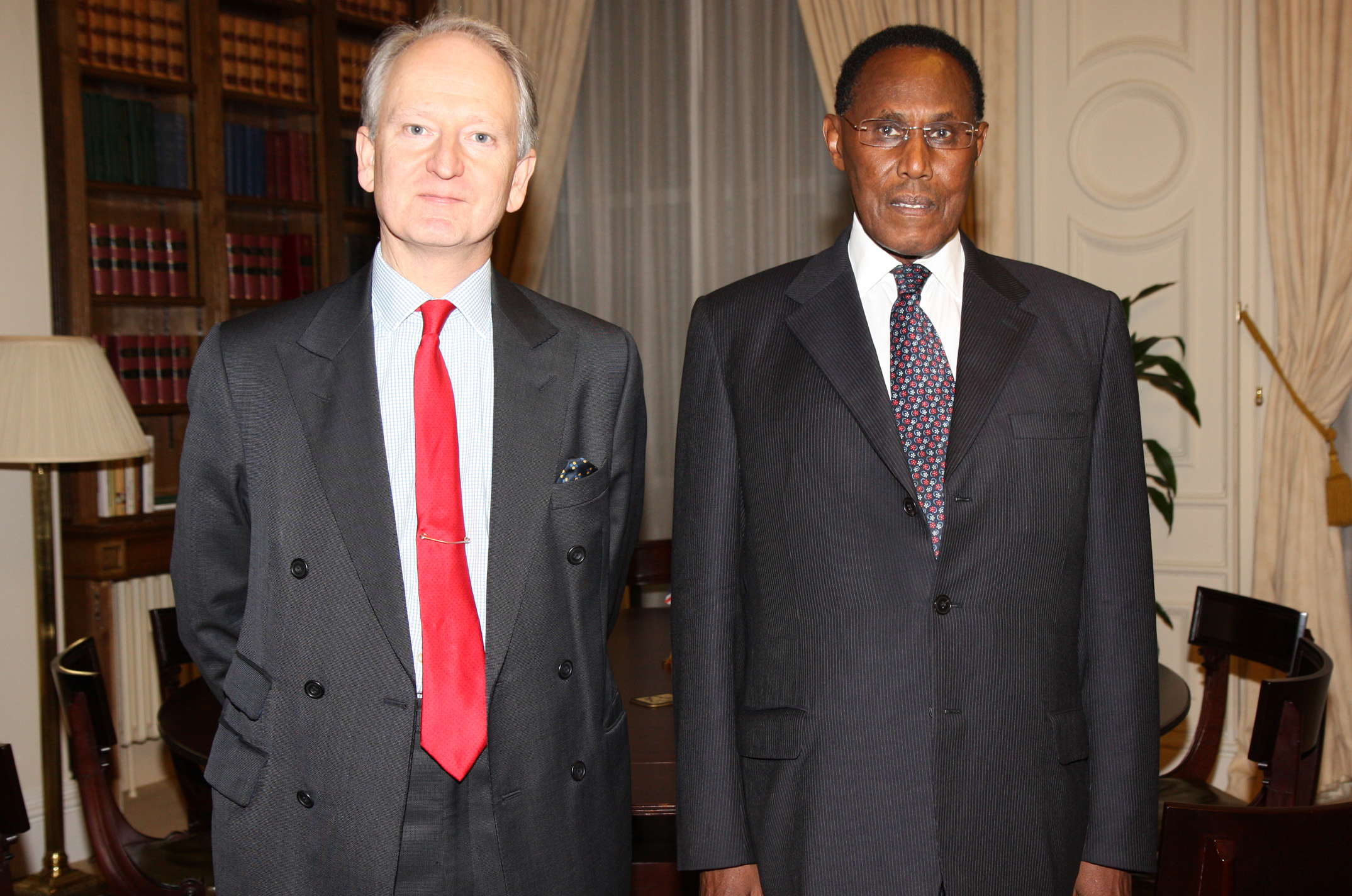
British Foreign Office Minister Henry Bellingham meeting the Acting Kenyan Foreign Minister Hon Prof George Saitoti in London, 10 February 2011

== The Kibaki succession race ==
In November 2011, Saitoti confirmed that he was in the race to succeed President Kibaki, who is set to retire after the next general election. Saitoti reiterated his candidature in January 2012, continuing to tour Kenya, with meet-the-people excursions to the Rift Valley, Eastern and Central provinces.

It appeared to be history repeating itself in the battle for the soul of the Kikuyu between, Saitoti, a Maasai with Kikuyu kith and kin, and Uhuru Kenyatta, a thorough-bred Kikuyu. Uhuru is widely thought as the presumptive successor to President Kibaki, but Saitoti was emerging also, as a likely candidate. In the event that Uhuru's run for the presidency is thwarted by the confirmed charges by the ICC, it remains a too-up as to whether Saitoti would have benefited from the spin-off.

== Private life ==
Saitoti was a businessman who had interests in agriculture, horticulture, real estates, hospitality and pastoralism.

Saitoti's family life received little publicity. His wife, Margaret Saitoti, was with him when the High Court dropped charges in the 16-year Goldenberg case. His brother, Ronald Musengi, has been a banking executive with the Kenya Commercial Bank. In February 2012, Ronald Musengi applied to be a member of the National Police Service Commission.

== Death ==
Saitoti died on Sunday 10 June 2012 at around 9:00 am when a Eurocopter AS350 helicopter belonging to the Kenya Police Air Wing registration 5Y-CDT, carrying him and the assistant Minister for Internal Security, Joshua Orwa Ojode, crashed in the Kibiku area of Ngong forest, killing them and four others. He was buried on 16 June in Kajiado North constituency. After the Maasai elders agreed to abandon the traditional burial rites and embrace the Catholic way, fifty bulls were slaughtered at the funeral in accordance with Maasai tradition. Al Shabaab militias and drug traffickers are the main suspects for the disaster. Investigations have not yet found anyone guilty. Saitoti was to table a ministerial statement in Parliament.

== List of publications ==
Saitoti, G. (2005). "Keynote address given during the official opening of the sub-regional seminar for TIVET policy makers and UNESCO UNEVOC Center Coordinators". Nairobi, Kenya.

____________(2004). "Education in Kenya: Challenges and policy responses". Paper presented at the Council on Foreign Relations, Washington D.C.

____________(2003) "National conference on education and training, Meeting the challenges of education and training during 21st century". Nairobi.

____________(2003). "Reflections on Africa Development", Journal of Third World Studies.

Saitoti, G. and KANU Review Committee(2002), Report of the KANU Review Committee, 1990. The committee, Nairobi.

____________(2002).The Challenges of Economic and Institutional Reforms in Africa. Ashgate Publishers Limited.

____________(1985). i mathematica, Politechnika Warszawska Technical.

____________ "A remark on Mod 2 K-Theory fundamental classes". Ann. Fac. Sci. Univ. Nat. Zaïre (Kinshasa)Sect. Math.-Phys. 3 (1977), no. 1, 61–63.

____________"Homology of a differential algebra". Publ. Math. Debrecen 23 (1976), no. 3-4, 235—237.

____________"K-Theory fundamental classes". Demonstration Math. 8 (1975), No. 4, 365–377.

____________A note on the homology of a differential graded algebra. Nigerian Journal of Science. 8 (1974), no. 1-2,127–130.

____________Loop spaces and K-theory. Journal of London Mathematics Society.(2) 9 (1974/75), 423–428.

== Positions ==
- Member, National Security Committee (NSAC), Kenya. (2008 – death)
- Chairman, Cabinet Sub-committee on ICC, Kenya. (2009 – death)
- Chairman, Party of National Unity (PNU) (2008 – death)
- Acting Minister for Foreign Affairs (October 2010 – August 2011)
- Minister of State for Provincial Administration and Internal Security (January 2008 – death)
- Minister of Education (November 2006 – January 2008)
- Minister of Education (7 December 2005 – 13 February 2006)
- Minister of Education (January 2003 – November 2005)
- Vice-President (3 April 1999 – 30 August 2002)
- Minister for Planning and National Development (December 1997 – April 1999)
- Vice-President (1 May 1989 – 8 January 1998)
- Minister of Finance (1983–1988)
- Vice-President, African Mathematical Union (1976–1979)

Political offices
Preceded by Josephat Njuguna Karanja	Vice-President of Kenya; 1989–1998	Succeeded by Vacant
Preceded by Vacant	Vice-President of Kenya; 1999–2002	Succeeded by Musalia Mudavadi
