= Kenyan High Commissioner to the United Kingdom =

Official Kenyan representative

Coordinates: 51.520794°N 0.145450°W

High Commissioner of Kenya to the United Kingdom
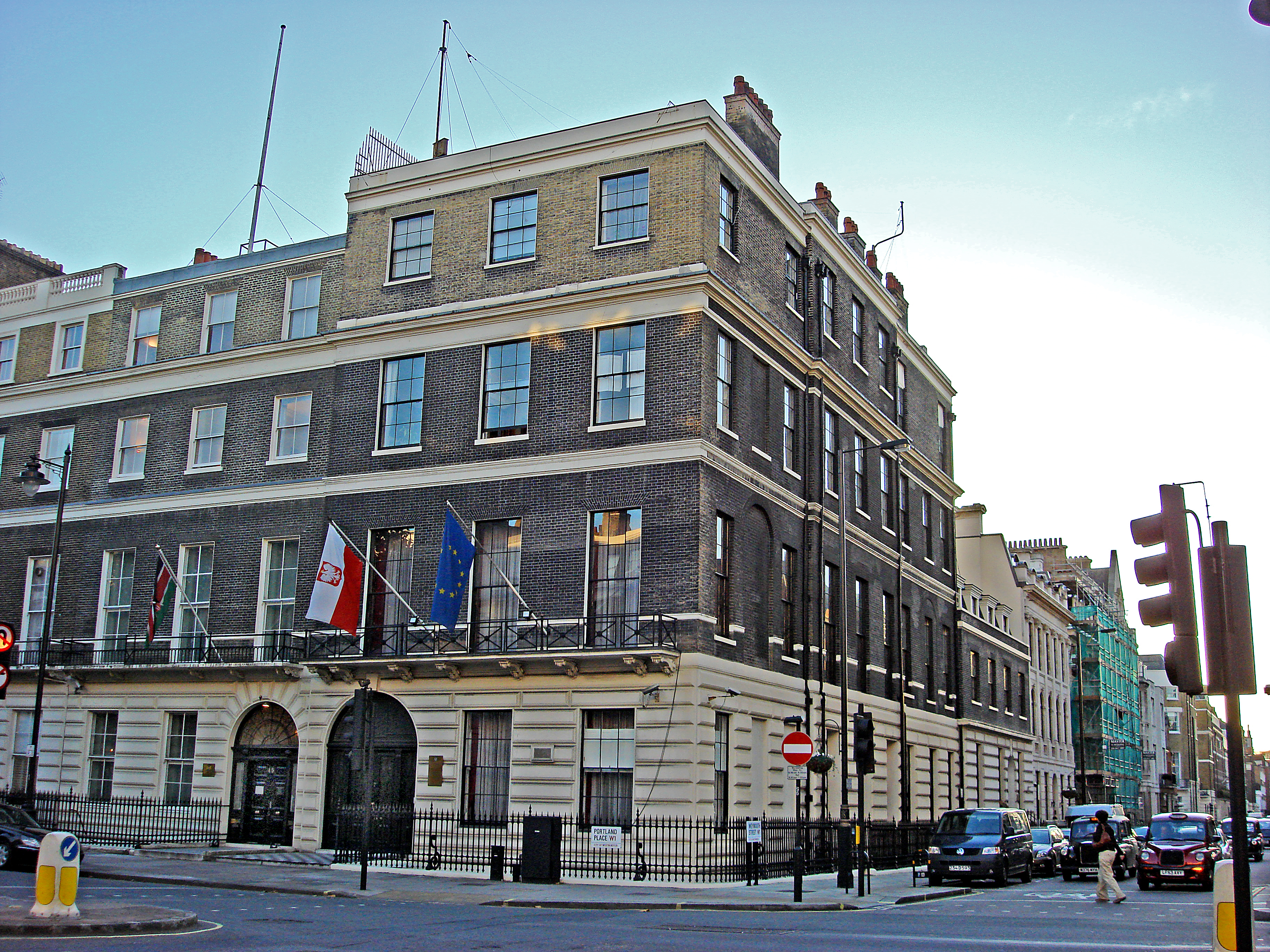
- Incumbent; Manoah Esipisu since November 14, 2018
- Inaugural holder: Josephat Karanja
- Formation: 1963

The Kenyan high commissioner in London is the official representative of the government in Nairobi to the government of the United Kingdom.

== List ==
Commissioned	High Commissioner	Observations	President of Kenya	Term end
1963	Josephat Karanja		Jomo Kenyatta	1970
1970	Ngethe Njoroge	Ng'ethe Njoroge was appointed Kenya's high commissioner in London. Njoroge was the brother of Njoroge Mungai, the minister for foreign affairs, and a relative of Kenyatta.	Jomo Kenyatta	1978
1978	Shadrack Kimalel		Daniel arap Moi	1981
1981	Bethwel Kiplagal		Daniel arap Moi	1983
1983	Benjamin Kipkulei		Daniel arap Moi	1986
1986	Sally Kosgei		Daniel arap Moi	1991
1991	Simon Bullut		Daniel arap Moi	1992
1992	Josephat Ruto		Daniel arap Moi	
1997	Mwanyengela Ngali		Daniel arap Moi	
2000	Nancy Kirui		Daniel arap Moi	
2005	Joseph Muchemi		Mwai Kibaki	
2009	Ephraim Ngare		Mwai Kibaki	
2014	Lazarus Ombai Amayo	1999-2004 he was high commissioner to India	Uhuru Kenyatta	2018
2018	Manoah Esipisu	rowspan=2|Uhuru Kenyatta	Uhuru Kenyatta	
2024	Catherine Karemu Kirumba		William Ruto	
2025	Maurice Odhiambo Makoloo		William Ruto	William Ruto

== See also ==
- List of high commissioners of the United Kingdom to Kenya
