= Chicago Urban League =

Affiliate of the National Urban League

The Chicago Urban League, established in 1916 in Chicago, Illinois, is an affiliate of the National Urban League that develops programs and partnerships and engages in advocacy to address the need for employment, entrepreneurship, affordable housing and quality education. As a consequence of the Northern Migration the League was established by an interracial group of community leaders as a resettlement organization assisting African-American migrants arriving in Chicago.

== History ==
Barbara A. Lumpkin was appointed Interim President and CEO of the Chicago Urban League in June 2018.

In the second quarter of 2021, the League received a $100,000 USD grant from Pfizer for a "Vaccine Safety and Effectiveness Campaign".

== Reports ==
Still Separate ..., published in 2005, found that Chicago had the fifth most racially segregated residential metropolitan area in the United States.

- The Vicious Circle: Race, Prison, Jobs and Community in Chicago, Illinois and the Nation (Chicago Urban League, 2002)
- Still Separate, Unequal, Race: Place and Policy in Chicago (Chicago Urban League, 2005)

== Supporters ==
- Earl W. Renfroe
- Mary Morello
- Parents for Rock and Rap
- Joanna Snowden Porter
