= Mary Morello =

American activist (1923–2026)

- Born: October 1, 1923; Marseilles, Illinois, U.S.
- Died: July 12, 2026 (aged 102); Los Angeles, California, U.S.
- Education: M.S. Loyola University
- Occupations: High school teacher; activist
- Spouse: Ngethe Njoroge (divorced)
- Children: Tom Morello
- Family: Njoroge Mungai (brother-in-law); Jemimah Gecaga (sister-in-law)

Mary Rose Morello (October 1, 1923 – July 12, 2026) was an American activist who founded the anti-censorship group Parents for Rock and Rap in 1987.

== Early life ==
Morello was born in Marseilles, Illinois, on October 1, 1923, to a mother of Irish and German descent, and a father of Italian (Piedmontese) descent. In 1954, she earned a master's degree in African and Latin American/Peru history at Loyola University Chicago. She spent the rest of the decade teaching English in Germany, Peru, and Japan while once circling the globe on a freighter.

From 1960 to 1963, Morello lived in Kenya, where she married Ngethe Njoroge. He had been an activist for Kenyan independence during the Mau Mau Uprising (1952–1960), and was the brother of politicians Njoroge Mungai and Jemimah Gecaga. Njoroge later became the first Kenyan delegate to the United Nations.

== Career ==
In the 1960s, Morello was involved in the Civil Rights movement and the NAACP. She was a long-time activist for the Chicago Urban League. In 1964, she and her husband moved to Harlem, New York, where she gave birth to their son Tom Morello (later known as the guitarist of Rage Against the Machine). They divorced in 1965 when Tom was one. Morello moved with him to Libertyville, Illinois, a small suburb north of Chicago where she taught social studies and US history at Libertyville High School.

In 1987, she quit her teaching job after 22 years to found Parents for Rock and Rap, an anti-censorship group in opposition to Tipper Gore's Parents Music Resource Center. She made three trips to the Soviet Union, through Siberia and Mongolia.

In 1991, Morello and many others battled against legislation being proposed in Congress titled Pornography Victims Compensation Act, numbered S. 983, or, later, S. 1521. The legislation was not enacted, in part because of grass-roots activism. On June 24, 1996, she received the Hugh M. Hefner First Amendment Award in Arts and Entertainment for her work with Parents for Rock and Rap.

In the fall of 1991, Morello began a volunteer teaching job at the Salvation Army Rehabilitation Center in Waukegan, Illinois, where she taught adult literacy. She was involved in the Cuba Coalition in Chicago, which works toward lifting the U.S. embargo against Cuba.

Morello is also known for her involvement in the 1999 debate on the incarceration of then death row inmate Mumia Abu-Jamal, convicted of the 1982 shooting of a Philadelphia police officer. In an editorial, she said:

"When a cop is shot someone must be found guilty. As my son Tom says, '...all rational thinking goes out the window'. A cop being killed is no different than any other person being killed. They choose their profession."

In 2007, Morello had a podcast together with Cindy Sheehan called The Mary Morello and Cindy Sheehan Show.

== Personal life and death ==
Morello was married to Ngethe Njoroge, a Kenyan journalist and diplomat. In 1964 they had a son, Rage Against the Machine guitarist Tom Morello, and divorced the following year in 1965.

Morello turned 100 in October 2023. She died in Los Angeles July 12, 2026, at the age of 102, following a hospitalization for pneumonia.

== Public appearances ==
Before Rage Against the Machine hit the stage at the Pinkpop Festival in 1994, Morello introduced them as the "Best Band in the Fucking Universe". On August 24, 2007, for the Rage Against the Machine reunion, she appeared again. On September 13, 2016, at a Prophets of Rage concert, she introduced them as "The best fucking band in the universe."
