= Githunguri Constituency =

Electoral constituency in Kenya

Githunguri
- constituency for the Parliament of Kenya
- Githunguri Constituency within Kiambu County

- Kiambu County within Kenya
- County: Kiambu
- Population: 165,232
- Area: 174 km^{2} (67.2 sq mi)

Current constituency
- Number of members: 1
- Party: UDA
- Member of Parliament: Gathoni Wamuchomba
- Wards: 5

Githunguri Constituency is an electoral constituency in Kenya. It is one of twelve constituencies in Kiambu County. The entire constituency is located within Kiambu County Council and was established for the 1963 elections.

== Members of Parliament ==
Elections	MP	Party	Notes
1963	Waira Kamau	KANU	
1969	Arthur Kinyanjui Magugu	KANU	One-party system
1974	Arthur Kinyanjui Magugu	KANU	One-party system
1979	Arthur Kinyanjui Magugu	KANU	One-party system
1983	Arthur Kinyanjui Magugu	KANU	One-party system.
1988	Arthur Kinyanjui Magugu	KANU	One-party system.
1992	Josephat Karanja	Ford-Asili	Karanja died during his tenure
1994	Njehu Gatabaki	Ford-Asili	By-elections
1997	Njehu Gatabaki	Social Democratic Party	
2002	Arthur Kinyanjui Magugu	Kenya African National Union	
2007	Peter Njoroge Baiya	Safina	
2013	Peter Njoroge Baiya	TNA	
2017	Gabriel Kago Mukuha	Jubilee Party	
2022	Gathoni Wamuchomba	UDA	

== Locations and wards ==
Location	Population
Githiga	30,918
Githunguri	35,365
Ikinu	24,504
Komothai	40,073
Ngewa	24,031
Total	154,891
1999 census.

Ward	Registered Voters
Githiga	13,407
Githunguri	15,246
Ikinu	12,292
Komothai	19,375
Ngewa	11,464
Total	71,784
*September 2005.
