= Tokyo International Conference on African Development =

Diplomatic conference

Tokyo International Conference on African Development (TICAD) (アフリカ開発会議, Afurika Kaihatsu Kaigi) is a conference held regularly with the objective "to promote high-level policy dialogue between African leaders and development partners." Japan is a co-host of these conferences. Other co-organizers of TICAD are the United Nations Office of the Special Advisor on Africa (UN-OSAA) and the United Nations Development Programme (UNDP). The series has included: TICAD I (Tokyo, 1993); TICAD II (Tokyo, 1998); TICAD III (Tokyo, 2003); TICAD IV (Yokohama, 2008); TICAD V (Yokohama, 2013); TICAD VI (Nairobi, Kenya, 2016); TICAD 7 (Yokohama, 2019); TICAD 8 (Tunis, Tunisia, 2022); and TICAD 9 (Yokohama, Japan, 2025). The next conference, TICAD 10, is scheduled to take place in Africa in 2028. It was the first time the event will be held in Africa while previous conferences were all held in Japan.

TICAD has been an evolving element in Japan's long-term commitment to fostering peace and stability in Africa through collaborative partnerships. In this context, Japan has stressed the importance of "Africa's ownership" of its development as well as of the "partnership" between Africa and the international community. The exchange of views amongst the conference delegates serves to underscore the case for more, not less assistance from the major world economies.

== Conference chronology ==
The TICAD conferences were intended to help to promote high-level policy dialogue amongst African leaders and their development partners. It emerged in 1993 after the end of the Cold War in an era of 'aid fatigue' among donor countries, and was critical in regenerating strong donor interest in Africa. TICAD has evolved into a major global forum to promote development on the continent under the principles of African "ownership" and international "partnership." These concepts became essential factors in the launch of the New Economic Partnership for Africa's Development (NEPAD), a strategy for development designed by Africans themselves. Earlier TICAD meetings have also resulted in key outcomes, in particular when Japan is hosting the G8, as it is in 2008. In 2000, for example, Japan hosted the Okinawa G8 Summit and invited leaders from several African countries to attend. Ideas proposed at TICAD II were also taken up by the G8 in the creation of the Global Fund to fight AIDS, Tuberculosis and Malaria.

== TICAD-I ==
TICAD I was held in 1993. African countries and their development partners discussed strategies for steps toward greater African prosperity. TICAD was formed at a time when the international community's interest in Africa was starting to wane, and donor fatigue was setting in. This conference produced the "Tokyo Declaration on African Development."

Delegations from 48 African nations participated in the conference, including four heads of state: Twelve other nations sent delegations; and a number of international organizations also attended as delegates and as observers.

=== Analysis ===
The conference was considered promising, but prospects remained uncertain. In the decades since that beginning, TICAD's quality has evolved in both complexity and quality. The emphasis has shifted from TICAD-I's relatively simple issues of direct aid to more multi-faceted and inter-related topics which combine in sustainable development programs.

== TICAD-II ==
TICAD II in 1998. African countries and their development partners agreed on the "Tokyo Agenda for Action" (TAA), which was intended to become a commonly understood strategic- and action-oriented set of guidelines. Poverty reduction in Africa and Africa's fuller integration into the global economy were recognized a fundamental goals. Following the TICAD II, a 2001 ministerial conference provided opportunity to discuss NEPAD.

Invitations were extended to a number of African countries and others. Some heads of state decided to attend; and a range of government ministers and others were amongst the participants in the conference.

=== Analysis ===
The agreement on an agenda was only considered a first step.

== TICAD-III ==
TICAD III was held in 2003, bringing together over 1000 delegates, including 23 heads of state and the Chairperson of the African Union. African countries and their development partners reviewed the achievements of the ten-year TICAD process, and there was discussion about future direction TICAD should take.

Invitations were extended to a number of African countries and others. Some heads of state decided to attend; and a range of government ministers and others were amongst the participants in the conference.

=== Analysis ===
The increase in numbers of heads of state attending signaled the modest acceptance of the forum as a potentially effective venue. Participants reaffirmed the contributions of the TICAD process to African development, noting its role in mobilizing the international community's interest and commitment to African development. In the years since TICAD-III, there has been the Africa-China, Africa-India and EU-AU summits, among others.

== TICAD-IV ==
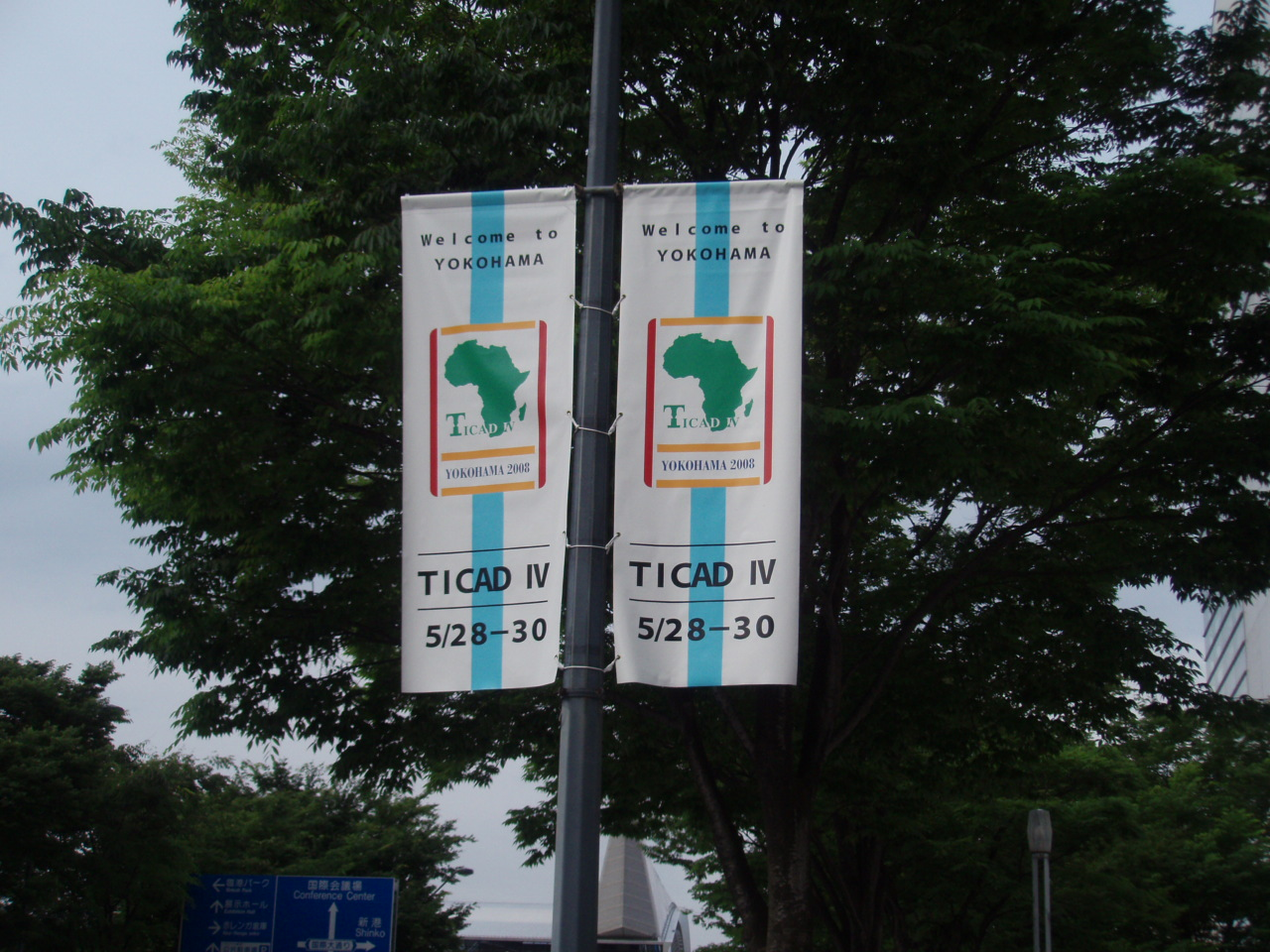
The crisp TICAD-IV banners become something of a bright token of welcome as Yokohama Meets Africa.

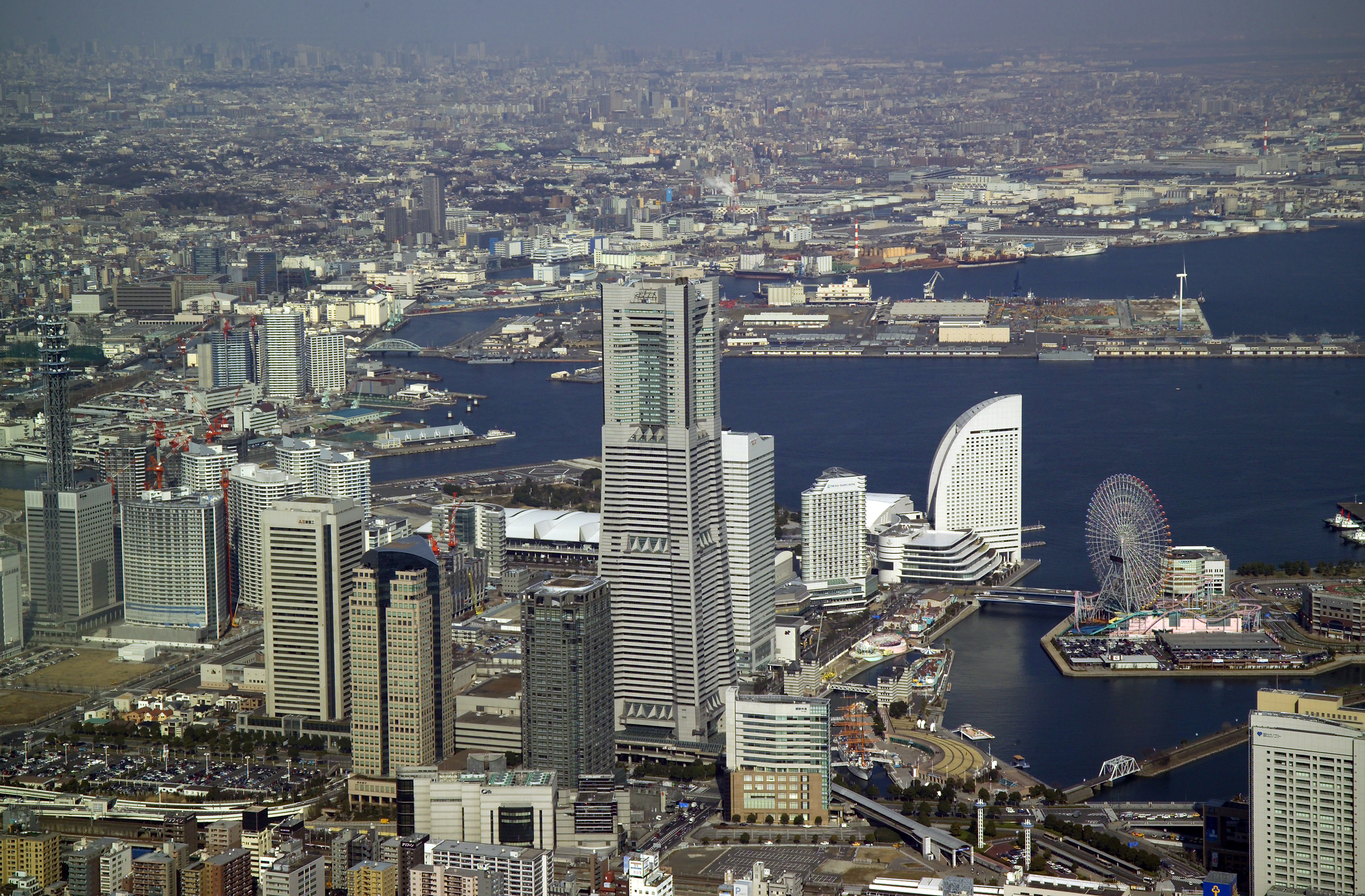
The TICAD-IV venue was Pacifico Yokohama, a centrally located waterside complex. The Minato Mirai area's most recognizable feature is the bold architectural plane of the grand InterContinental Hotel -- a stark, white, sail-shaped structure silhouetted against the contrasting expanse of the harbor.

TICAD IV (May 2008) was convened in Yokohama. In its 15-year history, this was the first time the conference was convened in a city other than Tokyo. Yokohama was preparing to mark the 150th anniversary of the opening of the port and the 120th anniversary of the commencement of the City Administration. In this context, TICAD IV and the slogan, Yokohama Meets Africa were intended to underscore the international character of the port and city.

This was the most heavily attended of the four TICAD events. Responding to the invitation were 51 African nations (all except Somalia), 17 African organisations, 12 Asian nations, 22 donor nations, and 55 international organizations, with a total of about 2,500 delegates. These included 40 presidents or prime ministers of African countries, twice the number of those present at TICAD III (2003). Also in Yokohama were organizers associated with "official side events" and other participants in the conference.

TICAD IV consisted of plenary sessions and twenty-four "thematic" sessions. TICAD focused on strategies for better mobilizing the knowledge and resources of the international community in the core areas of: (a) economic growth; (b) human security, including achieving the UN's Millennium Development Goals; and (c) environment/climate change issues. In addition, TICAD IV tried to identify possible inter-linkages within the context of the G8 Hokkaidō Tōyako Summit in July 2008. In this context, World Bank and International Monetary Fund Development Committee Executive Secretary, Kiyoshi Kodera, spoke at a pre-event meeting in which he argued that everyone needs to "accept the harsh reality" that sub-Saharan African countries will remain heavily dependent on foreign aid until they find a new growth path.

Attending the conference were representatives of the World Bank, the United Nations Development Programme (UNDP), a number of donor countries, non-governmental organisations (NGOs) and other relevant agencies. The shared perspectives of the conference delegates served to underscore the case for immediate assistance to help Africa's vulnerable economies to weather the global food and fuel crisis. Participants agreed that emergency food aid was necessary, but it was also necessary to carry out medium-to-long-term interventions, with special attention on the division of roles and complementarity among various development agencies.

Smaller scale projects were also included in the TICAD agenda. The Japanese introduced a projected JICA investment in replicating the "One Village One Product movement" (OVOP) in African contexts. In this context, the President of Malawi's visit to Japan also included a visit to OVOP headquarters in Osaka.

=== Making a difference ===
In a speech delivered at TICAD-IV, Japanese Prime Minister Yasuo Fukuda committed the government to extending yen-denominated loans worth up to ¥415-billion (US$4-billion) and financial assistance totalling about ¥260-billion (US$2.5-billion) over the next five years. Fukuda also committed the government to establishing a fund at the Japan Bank for International Cooperation aimed at doubling investment in Africa. The financial assistance would be provided through the fund over the next five years to help develop road networks and other traffic infrastructure. The Japanese Prime Minister also announced plans to deploy a "water defense force" tasked with providing instruction in water management. Moreover, Fukuda explained that his government aimed to help foster as many as 100,000 experts in the health and medicine fields.

Fukuda's announcement that Japan would extend generous assistance to African countries in spite of its tight financial condition is aimed at burnishing Japan's credentials in the international community. Prime Minister Fukuda's speech was designed to strengthen Japan's leadership as host of the G-8 meeting because aid to Africa would be an important item on the meeting's agenda. Another reason for the government's magnanimity is that Japan is trying to strengthen its relations with African countries to win their support for its bid to gain a permanent seat on the UN Security Council. The Japanese government learned a lesson from the failure of its 2005 campaign for permanent membership at the Security Council: Support from African countries, which account for one-fourth of U.N. membership, is construed as indispensable if Japan is to succeed in its bid. In his speech, Fukuda said, "Japan would like to work on U.N. Security Council reform in cooperation with its African friends."

Fukuda's actions during TICAD attracted media attention for what some journalists called the "marathon of mini-summits." In two days, the 71-year-old Prime Minister of Japan met one by one with 40 leaders of African nations, dedicating approximately twenty minutes to each one; and he also met with seven private sector Africa supporters. In addition, the Economy, Trade and Industry Minister, Akira Amari, met with African leaders in an effort to work towards developing closer relationships with countries participating in the conference. During TICAD week, Amari met with the leaders of Angola, Gabon and Uganda on Tuesday and Wednesday (May 27–28). Amari met with the leaders of Madagascar, Botswana, Democratic Republic of Congo, South Africa and Namibia on Thursday (May 29); and he met on Friday (May 30) with the leader of Nigeria. These Africa leaders are mainly exporters of resources necessary for manufacturers in Japan. For example, Nigeria is the biggest oil producer in Africa, and Angola has promising oil reserves. South Africa produces zirconium that is used for nuclear fuel rods, while the Democratic Republic of Congo produces cobalt, which is used by many industries for various purposes.

=== Analysis ===
Japan has long used aid as a key diplomatic tool. It was the world's top donor in 1991, but its overall assistance has been slipping as its debts increased. As China and India seeking to forge closer ties with the African continent, the conference is a key opportunity for Japan to maintain its diplomatic clout. According to the Japanese Foreign Ministry, Africa accounts for 89 percent of the world's total reserves of platinum, 60 percent of its diamonds, 53 percent of the cobalt, 37 percent of the zirconium and 34 percent of the chrome. The African continent remains a potential markets for Japan; and both China and India recognized an urgent need to secure commodities to fuel their economic booms.

In this context, the Forum on China-Africa Cooperation (FOCAC) in 2006 can be said to have marked a watershed for Africa's economic relations. The summit re-awakened the world's major powers not only to China's growing strategic influence in Africa but also highlighted Africa's increasing importance. In recent years, China has been providing large-scale assistance to African countries with the aim of securing a stake in the rich natural resources in the African continent; and India has been doing the same.

The conference provided a venue for non-governmental entities to expand a range of high-level contacts. In addition to the World Bank, an African Development Bank (AfDB) group delegation led by the institution's president, Donald Kaberuka, attended TICAD-IV. Also amongst the 2,500 attendees were academics, such as the president of Tsukuba University in Japan and Nobel laureate Joseph Stiglitz of Columbia University.

There were instances when the conference did not go as Japan expected. For instance, the Japanese government planned to include a statement in the Yokohama Declaration to cut greenhouse gas emissions by 50 percent from current levels by 2050. However, the government withdrew this provision after encountering fierce opposition from South Africa, a major polluter.

TICAD summits underscore the importance Asian economic and political competitors place in getting on the right side of African leaders - many of whom are sitting on huge mineral, oil and other resources. Africa is also emerging as a last frontier for financial investors. The continent also offers a growing market for low-end manufactured goods that are no longer exportable to the developed countries of Europe and America.

African perspective
African delegates arrived in Yokohama with a number of their own well-thought out agendas. Some voices argued that it would be better if Africa attended TICAD-V (2013) with a continental-wide agenda which could then be broken up into country-specific strategies which could be more fully explored during the subsequent bilateral meetings. Drawing up a common agenda detailing the trade and investment issues would seem a plausible strategy because the nations of the continent are grappling with similar challenge which include poor infrastructure and trade terms that are weighted heavily against Africa. In a sense, Thabo Mbeki embraced this continental strategy as he suggested that Africa's future economic growth should happen through trade and not aid. Mbeki said, "Without discounting the importance of aid, improved terms of trade for Africa are critical to ensure its full integration into the global economy." He also observed that "market access alone does not always translate in the ability for the developing countries to penetrate competitive world markets."

=== Hideyo Noguchi Africa Prize ===
The two initial Hideyo Noguchi Africa Prizes were conferred in conjunction with TICAD IV. This prize was created in honor of Hideyo Noguchi, a prominent Japanese bacteriologist who discovered the agent of syphilis in 1911, and who died in Africa while working towards the development of a vaccine for virulent yellow fever.

The first awards of the Hideyo Noguchi Africa Prize were planned to coincide with TICAD IV; and the conference venue was moved from Tokyo to Yokohama as another way of honoring the man after whom the prize was named. In 1899, Dr. Noguchi worked at the Yokohama Port Quarantine Office as an assistant quarantine doctor.

The first laureates of the Hideyo Noguchi Africa Prize, like Noguchi himself, are both medical doctors with a career-long interest in epidemiology and public health. They are Dr. Brian Greenwood and Dr. Miriam Were. For the honorees, the Prize represents both an acknowledgement of their past accomplishments and an investment in their prospective contributions in the years ahead. Japanese Prime Minister, Yasuo Fukuda, made the actual award presentation; and the Emperor and Empress were present at the 2008 ceremony along with a large number of African heads of state.

With significantly large money prizes attending this award, the Noguchi Prize already rivals the major established scientific awards. From the outset, the 2008 Noguchi Prizes—consisting of a citation, a medal and an honorarium of 100 million yen (US$843,668) -- were only intended to be the first in a continuing series; and subsequent prizes are expected to be awarded every five years. The prize, officially named "The Prize in Recognition of Outstanding Achievements in the Fields of Medical Research and Medical Services in Africa Awarded in Memory of Dr. Hideyo Noguchi," is managed by Japan International Cooperation Agency (JICA).

== TICAD-V ==
As TICAD-IV ended, plans were already being formulated for TICAD-V in June 2013. Prime Minister Fukuda Announced told delegates at TICAD-IV, "I pledge that by 2012-five years from now-Japan will have doubled its official development assistance (ODA) to Africa, increasing it gradually over these years." At the same time, Fukuda said his government would double its grand aid and technical cooperation for Africa by 2012.

TICAD-V was held in Yokohama 1–3 June 2013 and forty-one African heads of state, along with UN Secretary-General Ban Ki-moon and World Bank President Jim Yong Kim, attended. Japanese Prime Minister Shinzō Abe opened the conference by announcing a five-year $32 billion package to support infrastructure development and boost economic growth in Africa.

=== Analysis ===
The conference ended as one of the largest summit meetings ever held in Japan with the participants totaling more than 4,500, including Prime Minister Shinzo Abe, Minister for Foreign Affairs Fumio Kishida, as well as representatives from 51 African countries including 39 heads of state and government, delegates from 31 development partner countries and Asian nations, 72 international and regional organizations, the private sector, NGOs and civil society. In addition, a variety of side events were held with much attendance from the public. TICAD V upheld the core message of "Hand in Hand with a More Dynamic Africa." Under the concept, active discussions were conducted on the future of African development, centering on the main themes of TICAD V, namely "Robust and Sustainable Economy," "Inclusive and Resilient Society," and "Peace and Stability."As an outcome, TICAD V adopted two outcome documents, namely, "Yokohama Declaration 2013," presenting a future direction for African development, and "Yokohama Action Plan 2013–2017," a road map for the TICAD Process over the next five years with specific measures.

Since TICAD V, Japan has actively deployed its diplomacy toward Africa in order to maintain the momentum and to steadily implement its pledges. For example, the Japan–African Regional Economic Communities (RECs) Summit Roundtable was held in New York on the margins of the UN General Assembly on September 26, 2013, chaired by Prime Minister Abe. In the roundtable, participants exchanged views on agricultural development and food security. In addition, from November 24 to December 5, 2013, Japan dispatched a Public and Private Sector Joint Mission for Promoting Trade and Investment for Africa to the Republic of the Congo, the Gabonese Republic, and Côte d'Ivoire. Thus, Japan hopes to further develop its relations with Africa through such follow-up measures to TICAD V. Furthermore, Prime Minister Abe visited three African countries in January 2014, fulfilling his promise at TICAD V to visit Africa in the near future.

== TICAD VI ==
TICAD VI will be the first TICAD to be held in Africa. Kenya and Gambia had bid for the chance to hold it, but Gambia withdrew to allow Kenya to win. It will be held in Nairobi and 5,000 delegates are expected.

== TICAD VIII ==
TICAD VIII, the first since the COVID-19 pandemic, was held in Tunisia from 27 to 28 August 2022. Prime minister Fumio Kishida joined the meeting via video-conference after he tested positive for COVID-19. Five thousand guests were expected to attend the event.

== TICAD IX ==
The Ninth Tokyo International Conference on African Development (TICAD 9) was held in Yokohama on 20–22 August 2025. Date: Wednesday, 20 August through Friday, 22 August 2025 and Venue: PACIFICO YOKOHAMA, Exhibition Hall, Annex Hall, etc.
