= Anna Hudlun =

Anna Elizabeth Hudlun
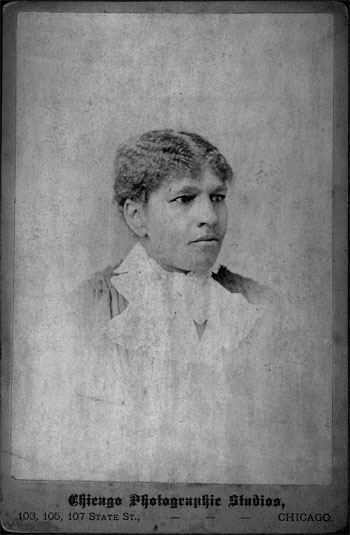
- Born: Anna Elizabeth Lewis; February 6, 1840; Uniontown, Pennsylvania, U.S.
- Died: November 21, 1914 (aged 74); Chicago, Illinois, U.S.
- Occupations: Humanitarian, civic worker
- Spouse: Joseph Henry Hudlun (m. 1855)
- Children: 9, including Joanna Snowden Porter

Anna Elizabeth Hudlun (née Lewis; 6 February 1840 – 21 November 1914) was an African American humanitarian and civic worker, who earned the names "Fire Angel" and "Chicago's Grand Old Lady" for her work with victims of the city's great fires in 1871 and 1874.

== Early life ==
Anna Elizabeth Lewis was born in Uniontown, Pennsylvania, the daughter of a mother recently freed by her Quaker enslavers. A single parent, Anna's mother found another Quaker family willing to take her daughter in, while she travelled with "one of the prominent families of the country". She later returned to resume care of her daughter, and the two went west, settling in Chicago in 1854 after a brief stop in St. Louis, Missouri.

While in St. Louis, Anna had met Joseph Henry Hudlun, born enslaved in Virginia in 1839. Reuniting in Chicago, the two married after a brief courtship in 1855. Their first child, Joanna Cecilia, was born in 1864. They had a total of nine children.

== Chicago and the Great Fires ==
To establish a home, and themselves as "substantial citizens", Anna and Joseph Hudlun undertook to purchase property. The five-room cottage they brought was one of the first houses in Chicago built by and for black owners, in 1857. This home, near Dearborn Station at 279 Third Avenue, became a center of community and civic activity, particularly notable during the "Great Fires" of the 1870s. As Hallie Quinn Brown wrote, "during the years of great growth and development of the city of Chicago, the lives of both Anna Elizabeth and Joseph Henry Hudlun blossomed with kindly impulses and good deeds."

Hudlun and her husband were hailed as heroes after the Great Chicago Fire of 1871, stepping in to assist those who had lost their homes. Joseph Hudlun, a respected member of the Board of Trade, was also noted for risking his life to return to the burning Board of Trade building in order to rescue valuable books and papers. Celebrated for his heroism, a portrait of Joseph was hung in the building. Anna Hudlun was described by the Chicago Tribune as an "angel of the fire", the couple having opened their cottage to five families – black and white – whose homes had been destroyed by the fire. Following the fire, Anna Hudlun had actively searched for the distressed, offering shelter and support. She maintained her "fire angel" title until her death. The couple repeated their efforts during Chicago's second fire in 1874, and Anna was again lauded for her humanitarian work, this time as "Chicago's Grand Old Lady".

== Humanitarian and civic work ==
Jessie Carney Smith has described Hudlun as "Chicago's foremost humanitarian and community worker of her time". A prominent community figure, "Hudlun's kindness, nurturing, and generous contribution to the social welfare of the African American community were well known". Herself a respected member of the city's Board of Trade, she was active in the Quinn Chapel African Methodist Episcopal Church, and in the black women's movement. She worked to keep Chicago's mixed schools open, and assisted with the care of dependents of the Juvenile Court. As part of her work within the black women's movement and the Federation of Women's Clubs, she helped in placing people in Chicago's Home for Aged and Infirm Colored People, co-founded by her daughter Joanna in 1898. Anna was an early member of the Old Settlers Club, which sought to keep alive "the memories of the work of the pioneers and the Negroes and to be of general to the Colored people of the city".

Joseph and Anna Hudlun also played an active role in the Underground Railroad, part of a network of black Chicagoans who fought the institution of slavery. Workers in Chicago, a center of anti-slavery activity, offered lodging, transportation, and were also personally involved in rescue efforts.

== Death and legacy ==
Anna Elizabeth Hudlun died on November 21, 1914, remembered "in the hearts of all classes of Chicago's cosmopolitan people who honored and loved her". A newspaper report described her as "one of the oldest Afro-American settlers in Chicago", and noted that at her funeral, which was held at Quinn Chapel, there were more than 50 floral tributes, and "many letters of condolences were received... from all parts of the country."
