= Washington Aggrey Jalang'o Okumu =

Kenyan politician

Washington Aggrey Jalang'o Okumu (21 February 1936 – 1 November 2016) was a Kenyan diplomat, politician, academic and author, who rose to fame as the mediator that convinced the Inkatha Freedom Party's leader, Mangosuthu Buthelezi, to be part of South Africa's democratic elections in 1994, thereby ensuring a peaceful transition for South Africa's politics. He is also the author of two books: 'Lumumba's Congo: Roots of Conflict' published in 1962 and 'The African Renaissance: History, Significance and Strategy' published in 2002.

== Early life ==
Okumu was born on 21 February 1936 in Siaya county, Kenya, to Joram Okumu and Miriam Okello. His father worked as a health inspector at the time.

== Education ==
Okumu's education was mainly in Maseno's mission schools, but he also attended Ngiya Primary School, where he was classmates with Barack Obama Sr., father to the former U.S President Barack Obama. After his father's death in 1951, politician Jaramogi Oginga Odinga promised to take care of his education. In 1956, Okumu completed his high school education, attaining the Cambridge University Overseas School Certificate. On the recommendation of the late Tom Mboya, Okumu was selected to be part of 'The Kennedy Airlift', a program aimed at providing education for young and bright East Africans. Okumu attended Iowa Wesleyan University in Mount Pleasant. In 1959, he enrolled for the International Student Relations Seminar (ISRS), a summer programme at Harvard University in Cambridge, Massachusetts. Okumu received his Bachelor of Arts degree from Harvard in 1962. He also studied economics at the University of Cambridge under the Commonwealth Scholarship and Fellowship Plan.

== Career ==
After his high school education, Okumu worked at the Ministry of Works, before moving to the U.S for further education. In 1962, after graduating from Harvard, he worked as a personal assistant to the late Jomo Kenyatta, the first Kenyan president. After his studies at the University of Cambridge, he returned to Kenya and worked with the former East African Railways & Harbours Corporation. After his three-year arrest and detention in 1968, Okumu moved to Vienna, Austria, in 1971, where he worked for the UN Industrial Development Organisation (UNIDO) as an ‘Industrial Development Officer' where he worked for 15 years. After this he worked as a consultant and lecturer in different institutions in Kenya, the UK, and in Austria. In addition to this, Okumu held various roles; including as Director of a British Christian think-tank, the Newick Park Initiative from 1987 through 1993 and the Ambassador-at-Large and international spokesman for the first major opposition party, the Forum for the Restoration of Democracy (FORD) in 1993.

== Okumu and Buthelezi ==
Okumu is credited as the one responsible for convincing the Zulu leader, Mangosuthu Buthelezi, to drop his demands for an independent Zulu nation and take part in South Africa's democratic elections in 1994. This was after a team of international mediators, whom Okumu had accompanied as special adviser, had tried and failed to convince Buthelezi. This is said to have helped the country avoid bloodshed and conduct peaceful elections.

== Personal life ==
Okumu married Rispah Achieng' Agol, a nurse, before leaving Kenya for the U.S and together they had eight children. Rispah died on 25 January 2011.

== Death ==
Okumu died in his home in Nyang'oma East village in Siaya county on 1 November 2016 after a battle with diabetes, hypertension and arthritis.
