= Samuel Bosire =

Kenyan judge

Justice Samuel Elkana Bosire was a former appeal judge in the High Court of Kenya alongside others like Justices Nyamu and Riaga. His rise to fame stems from the famous S.M. Otieno burial dispute and the time when he was appointed the chairman of the Goldenberg Commission of Inquiry by President Mwai Kibaki.

After much controversy, Mr. Bosire retired in 2014. He is currently undertaking a Master’s degree course in peace and conflict at Kisii University.

Bosire is a church elder at the Seventh-day Adventist Church-Nairobi Central, well known as Maxwell. Most recently, Mr. Bosire is the Secretary-General of the Gusii Council of Elders.

== Vetting Board verdict ==
In April 2012, the Kenya Judges and Magistrates Vetting Board found Justice Bosire unsuitable to hold office.

Reasons cited by the board included condoning torture of suspects during 1982 coup trials, ignoring a High Court order to summon retired President Daniel Moi, Prof George Saitoti, Mr Musalia Mudavadi and Mr Nicholas Biwott as witnesses. Justice Bosire appealed the ruling.

On 20 July 2012, the board also upheld its earlier ruling on Justice Bosire and other Court of Appeal judges Riaga Omollo, Emmanuel O'Kubasu, and Joseph Nyamu.

== See also ==
- Goldenberg scandal
- Kenya Judges and Magistrates Vetting Board
