= Jemimah Gecaga =

Kenyan legislator

- Born: 1920
- Died: 1979 (aged 59)
- Occupations: Politician; Businesswoman
- Spouse: Bethuel Mareka Gecaga
- Children: Udi Gecaga; Noni "Mary" Gecaga
- Parent(s): Leah Magana; George Segeni Njoroge
- Family: Njoroge Mungai (brother); Ngethe Njoroge (brother); Jomo Kenyatta (cousin); Mary Morello (sister-in-law); Tom Morello (nephew)

Jemimah Gecaga (1920–1979) was the first woman to serve in the legislature of Kenya and the founder of the women's advocacy organization, Maendeleo Ya Wanawake.

== Biography ==
Gecaga was born to a Kikuyu family in Kenya. Her parents, Leah Magana and George Segeni Njoroge, were Christian converts who attended the Church of the Torch which had been founded by the famous Church of Scotland minister, John William Arthur. Her father worked as a cook at a Presbyterian mission in Nairobi and later opened a store. She has five brothers and one sister including Kenyan Cabinet Minister and Member of Parliament Njoroge Mungai (1926–2014) and Kenyan diplomat Ngethe Njoroge (formerly married to American activist Mary Morello and father of American guitarist Tom Morello). Her cousin, Jomo Kenyatta, was the first elected president in Kenya.

In 1952, she founded Maendeleo Ya Wanawake, a women's NGO that advocates for women's rights and gender equity in Kenya. In 1958, she was nominated to the Legislative Council in Kenya, the first woman to serve in the parliament of the country; she served until 1962. She later served as President of the YWCA in Kenya, as a home economics lecturer at Jeanes School (The Kenya School of Government) and as a director at Skyline Advertising. In 1969, she was again nominated as a member of parliament; she served until 1974 when was replaced by her brother Njoroge Mungai.

== Personal life ==
She was married to barrister and later director of East African Tobacco Company, Bethuel Mareka "BM" Gecaga; they had two children, Udi Gecaga (married to Jeni Wambui Gecaga, the daughter of Jomo Kenyatta and sister of Uhuru Kenyatta) and Noni "Mary" Gecaga. Her granddaughter is Nana Gecaga (daughter of Udi). Gecaga died in 1979 at the age of 59.
