= Joanna Snowden Porter =

American clubwoman based in Chicago

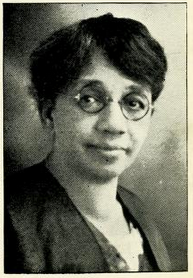
Joanna Snowden Porter, from a 1922 publication.

Joanna Snowden Porter (February 14, 1864 – October 1, 1941) was an American clubwoman based in Chicago; she was founder and president of the Northwestern Federation of Colored Women's Clubs.

== Early life ==
Joanna Cecilia Hudlin was born in Chicago, the daughter of Joseph Henry Hudlin and Anna Elizabeth Lewis Hudlin (the family name also appears as Hudlun or Hudlum). She graduated from Englewood High School before attending business college in Chicago. In 1905-1906 she was enrolled in the Institute of Social Science and Arts, which became the Chicago School of Civics and Philanthropy, and in 1920 was merged into the University of Chicago.

== Career ==
Joanna Snowden Porter worked for the City of Chicago in the 1910s and 1920s, in the Recorder's Office and as a probation officer at the Juvenile Court. She was on the founding board of the Chicago Urban League in 1916, representing the Chicago Federation of Colored Women's Clubs. She was founder and president of the Northwestern Federation of Colored Women's Clubs, served on the National Speakers' Bureau with Hallie Quinn Brown, treasurer of the Phyllis Wheatley Home for Colored Girls, and part of the Colored Women's Department of the Republican National Committee. She also wrote articles for National Notes, a black women's news magazine.

== Personal life ==
Joanna C. Hudlum married Samuel R. Snowden, a saloon keeper, in 1884. Their son Joseph was born in 1886. They separated in 1902. She married again, to lawyer James Hale Porter, in 1913. She died in 1941, aged 77 years.
