= Peter Njoroge Baiya =

Kenyan politician

Peter Njoroge Baiya (born 12 February 1963) is a Kenyan politician. He belongs to TNA, Jubilee and was elected to represent the Githunguri Constituency in the National Assembly of Kenya since the 2007 Kenyan parliamentary election.
