= Alex Coutinho =

Alex Coutinho (born 19 June 1959) is a Ugandan physician, public health advocate, academic, and a former executive director of the Infectious Diseases Institute of College of Health Sciences under Makerere University. He is the immediate past executive director of Partners In Health, Rwanda.

== Early life and education. ==
Coutinho was born on 19 June, 1959 in western Uganda, in a village on the fringes of Hoima and Masindi, to Martha Carmelina Coutinho, a nurse of Goan-Portuguese descent. He follows Godfrey Coutinho, elder brother, and was followed by a younger sister, Felistas Coutinho.

He attended Victoria Nile primary school, went to St. Mary's College Kisubi for his 'O' level and 'A' level studies and to Makerere University for advanced education. He earned a medical degree and a masters degree in physiology from Makerere University in Uganda and an MPH from the University of the Witwatersrand in South Africa.

== Career ==
Coutinho's career has focused on prevention and treatment of HIV/AIDS in Africa.. He has been involved with the HIV/AIDS epidemic since 1982, when the first cases emerged in Uganda. He has HIV-prevention, care and treatment programs in Swaziland, Uganda and Rwanda. He was a founding board member of the Global Fund in 2001 and a vice chair of the Global Fund's technical panel between 2002 and 2005. He also served as the chair of the board of directors of the International AIDS Vaccine Initiative based in New York. Still, from 2001 to 2007 he served as the executive director of TASO, expanding care and treatment services to over 100,000 individuals in Uganda. He served on the International Partnership for Microbicides board from 2003 to 2010, based in Washington, D.C. From 2007 to 2014, he was an executive director of the Infectious Diseases Institute at Makerere University, making seven years in this position. Here, he extended access to HIV care and treatment for 105,000 individuals. He championed the Abstinence, Be faithful and Use a condom (ABC) strategy in schools and implemented a male circumcision program.

== Honors ==
- Hideyo Noguchi Africa Prize, 2013 from the Japanese government
- Champion of the Hima Cement Golf Captain's prize

== Personal life ==
He married Sheila and they have three children: Neil, Jeremy and Karen.
