= Ronald Musengi =

Kenyan banker and civil servant

Honorable Ronald Musengi Commissioner, National Police Service Commission
- In office November 2012 – October 2018

Personal details
- Education: Brock University; University of Nairobi; International Institute of Business and Technology Australia; Mohawk College
- Occupation: Civil servant
- Profession: Career Banker; Graduate Engineer; Civil service

Ronald Musengi is a career banker and civil servant in Kenya, formerly a commissioner of the National Police Service Commission. He is widely known for institutional police reforms in Kenya including rigorous police lifestyle audits and development of numerous policy frameworks for the police service at a time when the National Police in Kenya was widely ridiculed for extensive corruption.
