= Brian Greenwood =

British physician (born 1938)

Professor Sir Brian Greenwood CBE FRS FRCP

Personal details
- Born: Brian Mellor Greenwood; 1938 (age 87–88)
- Occupation: Physician, biomedical research scientist

Sir Brian Mellor Greenwood (born 1938) is a British physician, biomedical research scientist, academic, and recipient of the first Hideyo Noguchi Africa Prize.

Greenwood is the Manson Professor of Clinical Tropical Medicine, London School of Hygiene and Tropical Medicine.

== Malaria research and mitigation ==
Greenwood's career has focused on mitigating the effects of malaria and pertinent research. In his ten years experience working in Nigeria, and his fifteen years as the head of the Medical Research Council Laboratories in the Gambia, his main research interests were malaria and infections caused by capsulated bacteria such as the meningococcus (Neissera meningitidis).

Malaria's stubborn resistance to control and treatment has been demonstrated in his West African clinical experience. Setbacks in a series of promising drug treatments have proven frustrating.

Although successes in research for a reliable vaccine have continued to prove elusive, Dr. Greenwood has also persisted in promoting a simpler preventive approach. He has been in the forefront of those who are encouraging the use of chemically treated mosquito nets to shield sleeping villagers from attack by the malaria-infected insects.

Greenwood was knighted in the 2012 New Year Honours for services to malaria research in Africa.

== Honours ==
- 1977 – Chalmers Medal, Royal Society of Tropical Medicine and Hygiene (RSTMH).
- 1987 – Appointed Commander of the Order of the British Empire in the Queen's Birthday Honours.
- 1991 – Donald Mackay Medal, American Society of Tropical Medicine and Hygiene.
- 1993 – an honorary doctorate from the Faculty of Science and Mathematics at Uppsala University, Sweden
- 1995 – Adesuyi Prize, West African Health Community (1995).
- 1998 – Inaugural Fellow of the Academy of Medical Sciences (FMedSci)
- 2001 – Manson Medal, Royal Society of Tropical Medicine and Hygiene.
- 2008 - Hideyo Noguchi Africa Prize in the Medical Research category
- 2011 – Appointed Knight Bachelor in the Queen's New Year Honours
- 2012 – John Dirks Canada Gairdner Global Health Award

=== Hideyo Noguchi Africa Prize ===
The Japanese Government established the Hideyo Noguchi Africa Prize in July 2006 as a new international medical research and services award. The announcement of tentative plans for the prize were timed to mark the official visit to by Prime Minister Junichiro Koizumi to Africa in May 2006. The announcement also marked the 80th anniversary of Dr. Noguchi's death. The Prize aims to honour individuals with outstanding achievements in combating various infectious diseases in Africa or in establishing innovative medical service systems.

The inaugural presentation ceremony and the initial laureate lectures coincide with the Fourth Tokyo International Conference on African Development (TICAD), which was held in Yokohama in late April 2008. This year's conference venue was moved from Tokyo to Yokohama as another way of honouring the man after whom the prize was named. In 1899, Dr. Noguchi worked at the Yokohama Port Quarantine Office as an assistant quarantine doctor.

Japanese Prime Minister Yasuo Fukuda made the actual award presentation; and the Emperor and Empress were present at the 2008 ceremony along with a large number of African heads of state.

Greenwood was honoured in the Medical Research category; and his announced laureate lecture topic was "Malaria elimination – Is it possible?"

The first awards of this international prize—consisting of a citation, a medal and an honorarium of 100 million yen (US$843,668) were only intended to be the first in a continuing series; and subsequently the Prize is expected to be awarded every five years. The prize has been made possible through a combination of government funding and private donations.
