= Miriam Were =

Kenyan public health advocate and academic (born 1940)

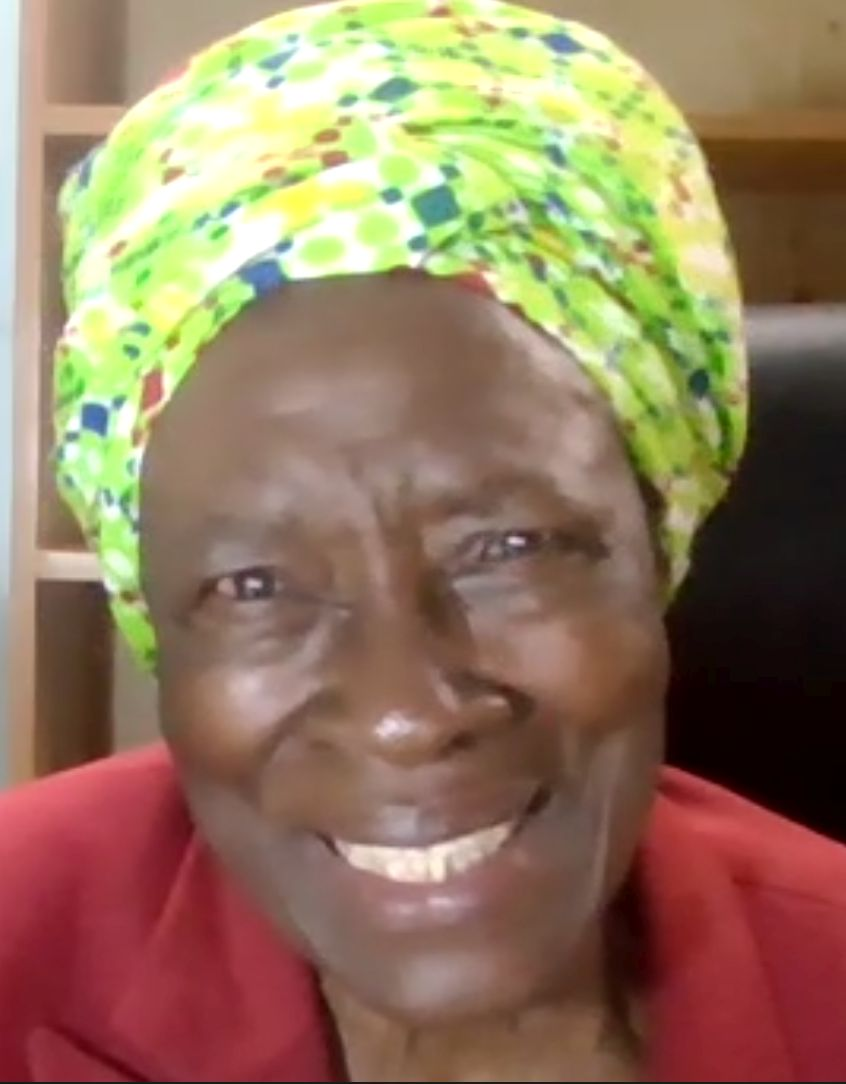
- Were in 2022
- Born: Miriam Khamadi Were; 12 April 1940 (age 86); Kenya
- Education: William Penn College; University of Nairobi
- Occupations: Public health advocate, academic and writer

Miriam Khamadi Were (born 12 April 1940) is a Kenyan public health advocate, academic, and recipient of the first Hideyo Noguchi Africa Prize. In 2022, she was nominated for the Nobel Peace Prize for her work in public health.

== Academic experience ==
As a graduate of William Penn College, in Oskaloosa, Iowa, Were began a career with a focus on helping others. With a degree in Natural Sciences and postgraduate Diploma in Education, she taught high school chemistry and biology before medical studies.

Were qualified as a medical doctor from the University of Nairobi, and she rose to become head of the Department of Community Medicine at Nairobi's School of Medicine.

Were's studies at Johns Hopkins University led to her 1981 doctorate in Public Health, Health Planning and Management. She has applied this training and academic background to programs focused on community-based empowerment. Her work aims to help others move towards implementing creative, effective, and self-sustaining programs. Her experiences have been marshaled in encouraging community-based initiatives.

== Administrative experience ==
As a co-founder of the UZIMA Foundation and in her work with African Medical and Research Foundation (AMREF), Were sought to put her academic training to good use. She focused on the process of bringing basic medical services and health rights to women and children in the villages of East Africa.

Were is the current chairperson of the National AIDS Control Council (NACC) Kenya. From a position closely associated with the Office of the President, NACC coordinates the national HIV/AIDS response in Kenya. Dr. Were is also the serving Chairperson of the African Medical and Research Foundation (AMREF) Board. In addition, she finds time to serve on the advisory board of the Kenya Anti-Corruption Commission (KACC), as well as on the board of directors of Medical Assistance Programs (MAP) International (US).

Were was Director of the United Nations Population Fund Country Support Team (UNFPA/CST) for East and Central Africa and Anglophone West Africa, based in Addis Ababa, Ethiopia. Prior to that, she was the World Health Organization (WHO) Representative and Chief of Mission in Ethiopia. Before WHO, she was Chief of Health and Nutrition in UNICEF, Ethiopia.

Were was recruited to UNICEF from the Department of Community Health in the Faculty of Medicine, University of Nairobi where she had become head of that department. While teaching at the university in Nairobi, she initiated the Community-Based Health Care (CBHC) project in Kakamega, in Western Kenya. Dr. Were was the Director of CBHC in the period from 1976 through 1982. This project won the UNICEF Maurice Pate Award of 1978, the first time any African institution had won this award.

She was appointed the Chancellor at Moi University, Eldoret, on Thursday, 19 September 2013.

In 2021, she took up the role of Community Engagement and Involvement lead in the National Institute for Health and Care Research (NIHR) CLEAN-Air (Africa) Global Health Research Group. She is also a member of the Lancet COVID-19 Commission.

== Creative writing ==
Were has also written poetry and fiction and is the author of four novels: The Boy In Between (1969), The High School Gent (1969), The Eighth Wife (1972), and Your Heart Is My Altar (1980).

== Selected works ==
- 2002 – "Kakamega, Kenya: A Promising Start Derailed," in Just and Lasting Change: When Communities Own Their Futures, Daniel Taylor-Ide and Carl E. Taylor, eds. Baltimore: Johns Hopkins Press. ISBN 0-8018-6825-4
- 1985 – "Extended Family Involvement of Urban Professional Women" (with Harriette MacAdoo), in Women in Africa and the African Diaspora, Rosalyn Terborg-Penn and Andrea Benton Rushing, eds Washington, D.C." Howard University Press. ISBN 0-88258-194-5

== Honours ==
- Elder of the Order of the Burning Spear (EBS), 2005 – Kenya.
- Medal of the Italian Cabinet, 2006 – Italy.
- Queen Elizabeth II Gold Medal for Outstanding Contributions to International Public Health and Supporting the health needs of disadvantaged people, 2007 United Kingdom.
- Légion d'honneur, Chevalier, 2008 — France.
- Awarded first Hideyo Noguchi Africa Prize by the Japanese Government in the Medical Services category
- Distinguished Career Award, 2015 – William Penn University. Oskaloosa, IA.
- Nobel Peace Prize nomination, 2022.

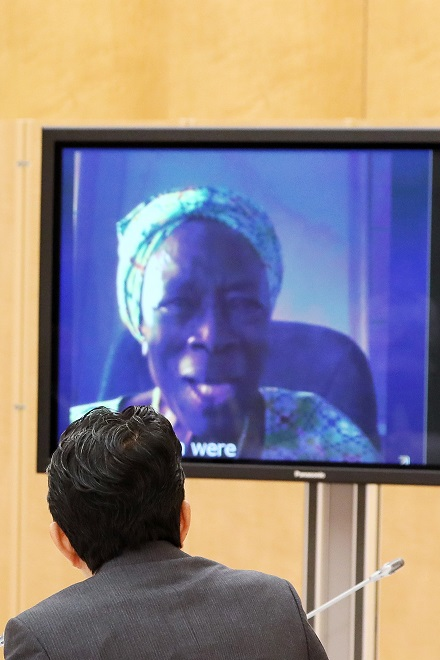
Miriam K. Were

=== Hideyo Noguchi Africa Prize ===
The Japanese Government established the Hideyo Noguchi Africa Prize in July 2006 as a new international medical research and services award. The first announcement of plans to create this prize was timed to mark the official visit to Africa by Prime Minister Junichiro Koizumi in May 2006. The timing also marked the 80th anniversary of Dr. Noguchi's death. The Prize aims to honour individuals with outstanding achievements in combating various infectious diseases in Africa or in establishing innovative medical service systems.

The inaugural presentation ceremony and the initial laureate lectures coincided with the Fourth Tokyo International Conference on African Development (TICAD), which was held in Yokohama in late-April 2008. This year's conference venue was moved from Tokyo to Yokohama as another way of honouring the man after whom the prize was named. In 1899, Dr. Noguchi worked at the Yokohama Port Quarantine Office as an assistant quarantine doctor.

Japanese Prime Minister Yasuo Fukuda made the actual award presentation, and the Emperor and Empress were present at the 2008 ceremony, along with a large number of African heads of state.

Were was honoured in the Medical Services category; her laureate lecture topic was "Potential for Improvement in Africa's Health Through Evidence and Persistence in the Spirit of Dr. Hideyo Noguchi".

The first awards of this international prize—consisting of a citation, a medal and an honorarium of 100 million yen (US$843,668) were only intended to be the first in a continuing series; and subsequently the Prize is expected to be awarded every five years. The prize has been made possible through a combination of government funding and private donations.
