= Francis Masakhalia =

Kenyan politician

Francis Omoto Masakhalia is a Kenyan politician. He was minister for Finance in Kenya and the first member of parliament for the Butula Constituency. He holds a PhD in Development Economics and degrees from Delhi University (BA), University of Denver (MBA), and Harvard Kennedy School (MPA).
