= Hideyo Noguchi Africa Prize =

- Awarded for: Outstanding achievements in medical research and medical services in Africa
- Sponsored by: Government of Japan
- Country: Japan
- Presented by: Japan
- Established: 2008
- First award: 2008
- Website: http://www.noguchiprize.afro.who.int/en/home/

The Hideyo Noguchi Africa Prize (野口英世アフリカ賞, Noguchi Hideyo Afurika Shō) honors men and women "with outstanding achievements in the fields of medical research and medical services to combat infectious and other diseases in Africa, thus contributing to the health and welfare of the African people and of all humankind." The prize, officially named "The Prize in Recognition of Outstanding Achievements in the Fields of Medical Research and Medical Services in Africa Awarded in Memory of Dr. Hideyo Noguchi," is managed by Japan International Cooperation Agency (JICA).

== Background ==
The Japanese Government established the Noguchi Prize in July 2006 as a new international medical research and services award. Release of news about the planned prize was timed to mark the official visit to by Prime Minister Junichiro Koizumi to Africa in May 2006. The announcement of this new international prize also marked the 80th anniversary of Dr. Noguchi's death. The Prize aims to honor individuals with outstanding achievements in combating various infectious diseases in Africa or in establishing innovative medical service systems. As preliminary discussions about the award were disclosed, Koizumi explained that he hoped that many countries in the world would take an interest in this initiative.

The awarding of the Noguchi Prize is planned to be a keynote event at the Tokyo International Conference on African Development (TICAD). TICAD is a policy forum which Japan initiated in 1993. Other co-organizers are the United Nations Office of the Special Advisor on Africa (OSSA), the United Nations Development Program and the World Bank. Over time, the TICAD meetings have evolved into a major global framework to facilitate the implementation of initiatives for promoting African development under the dual principle of African "ownership" and international "partnership".

- At the first conference (TICAD-I), African countries and their development partners determined to do their utmost for African stability and prosperity.
- At TICAD-II, African countries and their development partners agreed on the "Tokyo Agenda for Action" (TAA), the strategic and action oriented guideline, with poverty reduction in Africa and its integration into the global economy as two fundamental goals.
- TICAD-III brought together some 1,000 delegates, including 23 heads of state and the Chairperson of the African Union Commission. African countries and their development partners reviewed the achievements of the ten year TICAD process, discussed the future direction it should take in light of the latest developments on the African continent and in the international arena, and declared the "TICAD Tenth Anniversary Declaration".
- TICAD-IV aimed to mobilizes knowledge and resources of the international community in the core areas of boosting economic growth, ensuring human security and addressing environment and climate change issues. TICAD IV is scheduled to conclude with the adoption of the "Yokohama Declaration", outlining guiding principles and approaches to African development among TICAD stakeholders, as well as the "Yokohama Action Plan" and the "Yokohama Follow-up Mechanism", laying out a road map for action-oriented initiatives with measurable targets.

== Hideyo Noguchi ==
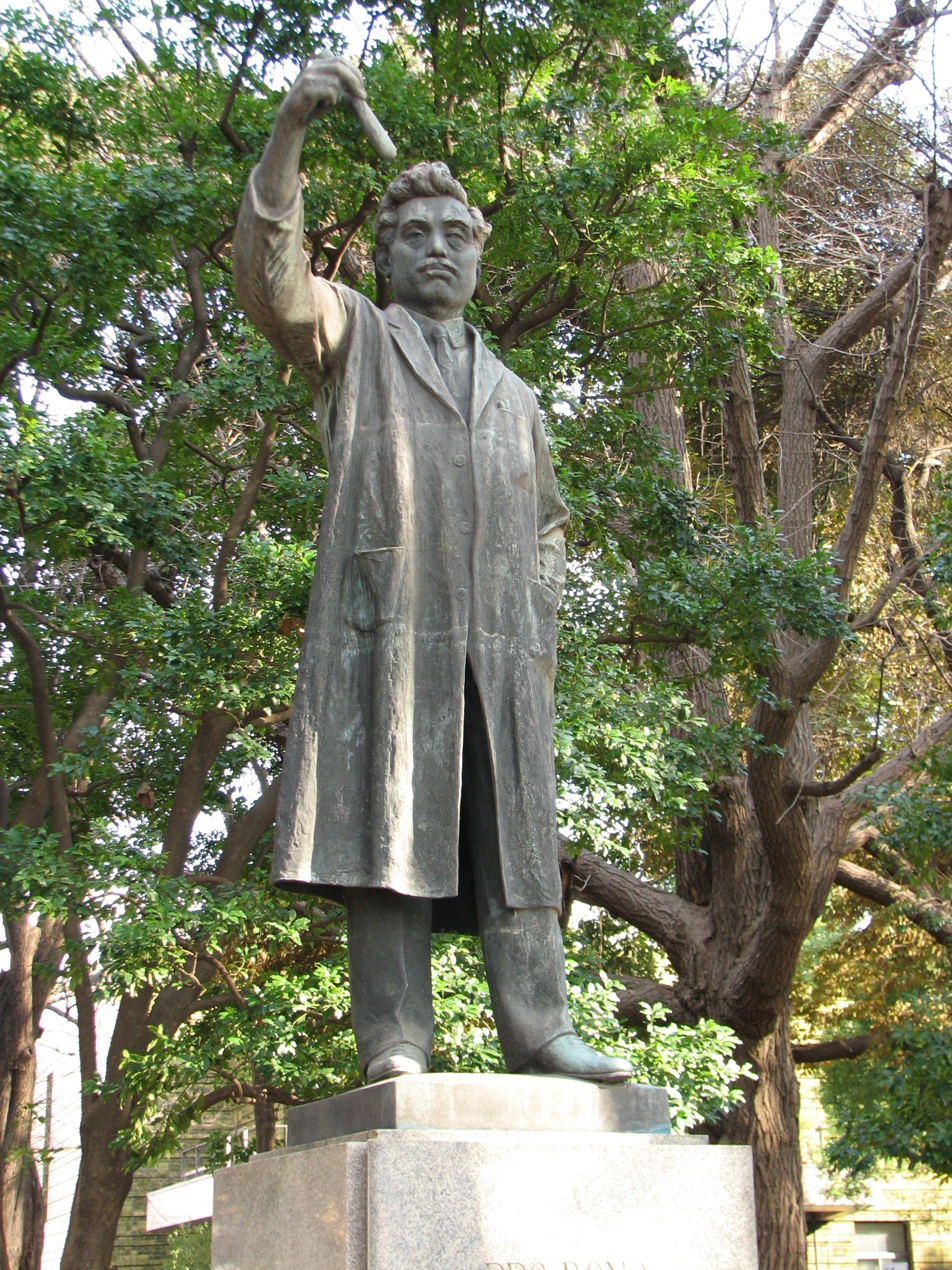
Statue of Hideyo Noguchi in Ueno Park, in Tokyo.

Hideyo Noguchi was a prominent Japanese bacteriologist who discovered the agent of syphilis in 1911. Noguchi's work would later attract the scrutiny of the committee evaluating nominations for the Nobel Prize in Medicine. The Nobel Foundation archives have been only recently opened for public inspection; and what was once only speculation is now confirmed. In 1914, for example, Dr. Ikutaro Hirai of Kyoto nominated Noguchi for the Nobel Prize in Medicine because of his bacteriological and biological works.

In 1918, Noguchi traveled extensively in Central America and South America to do research for a vaccine for yellow fever. He traveled to Africa to try to confirm his findings; and he wanted to test the hypothesis that yellow fever was caused by spirochaete bacteria instead of a virus. While working in Accra, Gold Coast (modern-day Ghana), he was himself struck down by the yellow fever virus. His last words were reported to have been, "I don't understand."

After his death, Noguchi's body was returned to the United States; but the Noguchi Prize is arguably poised to become a more meaningful memorial than his modest grave marker in New York City's Woodlawn Cemetery.

== Inaugural award in 2008 ==
The first laureates of the Hideyo Noguchi Africa Prize, like Noguchi himself, are both medical doctors with a career-long interest in epidemiology and public health. They are Dr. Brian Greenwood and Dr. Miriam Were. For the honorees, the Prize represents both an acknowledgment of their past accomplishments and an investment in their prospective contributions in the years ahead.

Japanese Prime Minister Yasuo Fukuda made the actual award presentation; and the Emperor and Empress were present at the 2008 ceremony along with a large number of African heads of state.

The presentation ceremony and laureate lectures coincided with TICAD-IV, which was held in Yokohama in late May 2008. This year's conference venue was moved from Tokyo to Yokohama as another way of honoring the man after whom the prize was named. In 1899, Dr. Noguchi worked at the Yokohama Port Quarantine Office as an assistant quarantine doctor.

Prof. Greenwood, the Manson Professor of Clinical Tropical Medicine at the London School of Hygiene and Tropical Medicine (LSHTM), was honored in the Medical Research category; and his laureate lecture topic was "Malaria elimination – Is it possible?"

Prof. Were, chairperson of Kenya's National AIDS Control Council (NACC), chairperson of the African Medical and Research Foundation (AMREF) and formerly Professor of Community Health at the University of Nairobi School of Medicine, was honored in the Medical Services category; and her laureate lecture was "Potential for Improvement in Africa's Health Through Evidence and Persistence in the Spirit of Dr. Hideyo Noguchi."

With significantly large money prizes attending this award, the Noguchi Prize already rivals the major established scientific awards. From the outset, the 2008 Noguchi Prizes—consisting of a citation, a medal and an honorarium of 100 million yen (US$843,668) -- were only intended to be the first in a continuing series; and subsequent prizes are expected to be awarded every five years. The prize has been made possible through a combination of government funding and private donations.

== List of laureates ==
The Japanese government has commemorated Dr. Noguchi's life by printing his portrait on Japanese 1000 yen banknotes since 2004; and this new initiative intends to do more than honoring the man himself. The Hideyo Noguchi Africa Prize is expected to draw attention to those whose own work mirrors what Dr. Noguchi strove to achieve.

Medical Research Category

- 2019 Jean-Jacques Muyembe-Tamfum (Democratic Republic of the Congo), General Director of the National Institute of Biomedical Research (INRB), Professor of Medical Microbiology/ Virology, Faculty of Medicine, University of Kinshasa
- 2013 Peter Piot (Belgium)
- 2008 Brian Greenwood (UK).

Medical Services Category

- 2019 Francis Gervase Omaswa (Republic of Uganda) Executive Director of African Center for Global Health and Social Transformation (ACHEST)
- 2013 Alex Coutinho (Uganda)
- 2008 Miriam Were (Kenya).

== See also ==
- List of medicine awards
- The Global Fund to Fight AIDS, Tuberculosis and Malaria
- Millennium Development Goals and United Nations Millennium Declaration
