= Parents for Rock and Rap =

American anti-censorship campaign

Parents for Rock and Rap, founded in 1987 by Mary Morello in the United States, was an anti-censorship campaign which focuses on campaigning for the importance of free speech in popular music. For the work that Mary Morello put into this, she won a Hugh M. Hefner First Amendment Award in 1996. The campaign mainly focused on opposition to the Parents Music Resource Center.

Mary Morello was also the mother of guitar player Tom Morello, of Rage Against the Machine, Audioslave, The Nightwatchman and Street Sweeper Social Club.
