= Ikinu =

- Location within Kenya
- Coordinates: 1.1°S 36.8°E
- Country: Kenya
- Province: Central Province
- Time zone: UTC+3 (EAT)
- Climate: Cfb

Ikinu is a small town in Kenya's Central Province. Ikinu has a shopping centre and a primary school under the name Ikinu Primary school. The shopping centre is located along the Kiambu- Githunguri Road. It serves as a central lake with outlet roads leading to villages like Karia, Ngemwa, kiaibabu, kamondo and Gathaithi.

Due to government boundary changes, where counties were introduced, replacing what was formerly understood as provinces, Ikinu is located in a county known as Kiambu County.

Ikinu is primarily agricultural.
