= Nana Gecaga =

Kenyan businesswoman and corporate executive

- Born: March 1978 (age 48); Kenya
- Education: American InterContinental University
- Occupation: Corporate executive
- Years active: 2004–present

Nana Gecaga (born 1978), is a Kenyan businesswoman and corporate executive, who was the CEO of the Kenyatta International Convention Centre (KICC), from April 2016 to December 2022. KICC is a building owned by the government of Kenya, which hosts conferences, concerts and exhibitions.

== Background and education ==
Gecaga was born in Kenya in March 1978 to Jeni Wambui, a daughter to Jomo Kenyatta, the first president of Kenya (1964–1978), and Udi Gecaga, son of Jemimah Gecaga.

Gecaga is a niece to Uhuru Kenyatta, the president of Kenya (2013–2022).

She holds a bachelor's degree in marketing obtained from the American InterContinental University in London, United Kingdom.

== Career ==
Gecaga works primarily in international marketing and tourism. She is credited with being partly responsible for Kenya's successful bid to host the 2009 MTV Africa Music Awards.

She previously worked as the head of marketing at KICC. Following that, she was employed as marketing and special programmes advisor to the cabinet secretary of Ministry of Tourism.

Effective 1 April 2016, Najib Balala, the Tourism Cabinet secretary, appointed Gecaga as the acting managing director of the Kenyatta International Convention Centre, pending the selection of a substantive CEO.

== Other considerations ==
Gecaga is a single mother of three children. In July 2018, she was elected deputy chairperson of the African chapter of the International Congress and Convention Association (ICCA).

She is a recovering alcoholic, and has been sober since 1999.
