= Leah Marangu =

Kenyan scholar

Leah Marangu MBS, EBS
- Born: Leah Marangu; 2 July 1952 (age 74); South Imenti, Meru County
- Education: Olivet Nazarene University; Northern Illinois University; Iowa State University
- Occupation: Educator
- Years active: 1978 – present
- Known for: East Africa's first woman full professor Kenya's first woman vice-chancellor
- Title: Vice-chancellor

Leah Marangu (born 2 July 1952) is a Kenyan academic. She is considered to be one of Kenya's most distinguished and decorated scholars.

== Education ==
Marangu was born in South Imenti, Meru County, Kenya. She attended Kaaga High School and later trained in public health nursing and midwifery at Maua Methodist Hospital. She obtained a Bachelor of Science degree in Home Economics from Olivet Nazarene University and two Master of Science degrees in Home Economics and Family Environment from Northern Illinois University. She subsequently obtained a Ph.D. in Home Economics from Iowa State University.

== Career ==
Marangu joined the faculty of Kenyatta University in 1978, where she was appointed a full professor and chair of the Department of Home Economics in 1988, becoming the first female full professor in East Africa. During this time, she also worked as a visiting professor for 12 universities in the United States, and also served as chair of home and family life at Brigham Young University. She served as the vice-chancellor of Africa Nazarene University between 1996 and 2017. She became the chair of the board of directors of the Jomo Kenyatta Foundation in 2005, with her appointment marking the first time a woman had held such a post in a parastatal in Kenya.

Marangu has served Kenya in various capacities, including as part of the Commission for University Education, Egerton University Council, National Council of Science and Technology, Kenya Bureau of Standards, Kenya Institute of Education, Institute of Policy Analysis and Research, Inter University Council for East Africa, and the Taskforce on Performance Contract, among other institutions. She is also the co-founder of Education for All Children, an education-to-employment NGO based in Nairobi.

=== Awards ===
Marangu is an honorary alumni of Kenyatta University. In 2001, she was awarded the Distinguished Alumni Award from Iowa State University, the highest alumni award at the institution. She has also received an International Leadership and Character Award and Distinguished Achievement Citation from the university. She is a recipient of Olivet Nazarene University's Outstanding Alumni Lay Award (1996), Doctor of Letters, and the Maggie Sloan Crawford Award.

Marangu was decorated with the Silver Star of Kenya in 1986 and the Moran of the Burning Spear (MBS) in 2003 by former presidents Daniel Moi and Mwai Kibaki respectively. In 2018, former president Uhuru Kenyatta awarded her the State Honour of the Elder of the Order of the Burning Spear (EBS) in recognition of her contributions to the field of education.

The University of Nairobi has also recognized her as one of the Women Trailblazers in Kenya as an educator.

=== Publications ===
Marangu has published more than 50 peer-reviewed publications and has attracted over US$2.1 million in research grants.

=== Family ===
Marangu is married to professor John Marangu. She is a mother and a grandmother.
