= IIBT Vietnam =

- International Institute of Business & Technology
- Motto: "International Education, Your World."
- Type: Private, for-profit studies
- Chairman: Kien Dinh Pham
- President: Dr. Glenn Watkins
- Location: Ho Chi Minh City, Vietnam
- Campus: Danang (planned), Ha Noi (planned), Ho Chi Minh City
- Colors: Blue & White
- Mascot: Book
- Website: www.iibt.edu.vn www.iibtvietnam.edu.vn

International Institute of Business and Technology (IIBT) is an Australian government approved Higher Education (HE) and Vocational Education Trainer (VET) provider of pre-university, first-year university and English programs. The school has one campus in Ho Chi Minh City.

Other overseas campuses are located in Sri Lanka, China, Indonesia and in Perth, Australia.

== University Direct Entry Program ==
Besides providing General English courses, IIBT is known for offering courses to students from China, Vietnam and Indonesia that enable them to get direct entry into top universities in Australia.

== Partner Universities ==
IIBT has a unique pathway that grants students entrance into 2nd-year in an Australian university.

- Central Queensland University
- Swinburne University of Technology
- Curtin University
- Edith Cowan University
- University of Wollongong
- Bond University
- University of Tasmania

== See also ==
- IIBT Vietnam
- IIBT Australia
- IDP Education
- British Council
