= Josephat Karanja =

5th Vice President of Kenya

The Honourable Josephat Karanja E.G.H.

5th Vice-President of Kenya
- In office 24 March 1988 – 1 May 1989
- President: Daniel arap Moi
- Preceded by: Mwai Kibaki
- Succeeded by: George Saitoti

Personal details
- Born: Josephat Njuguna Karanja; 5 February 1931
- Died: 28 February 1994 (aged 63) Nairobi, Kenya
- Party: Kenya African National Union
- Education: Princeton University (PhD)
- Occupation: Politician

Josephat Njuguna Karanja (5 February 1931 – 28 February 1994) was the fifth Vice-President of the Republic of Kenya between 1988 and 1989.

He resigned to avoid an ongoing vote-of-no-confidence in the Kenyan Parliament. He was accused by the now late Hon. David Mwenje Member of Parliament for Embakasi Constituency of wanting to overthrow President Daniel arap Moi's government by soliciting help from foreign nations. His large network of friends from the west – mainly US and Britain – where he had been a High Commissioner Ambassador. The speculation was fuelled by his wife being from a foreign country (Uganda). He was accused of displaying the stunning beauty at a time when political wives were never seen nor heard. Few people (mainly powerful) failed to understand his western ideological thinking.

He was a member of parliament for Mathare Constituency (today Kasarani Constituency) during his VP years, but later moved to Githunguri Constituency, which he won in 1992 after two previous failed tries against Arthur Magugu. Previously, between 1964 and 1970, he had been the youngest (at 33) to serve as High Commissioner (Ambassador) to Britain, which was and still is one of the most important economic partners to Kenya; and had, beginning at age 40, served as the Vice-Chancellor of the University of Nairobi. He is probably more remembered for his tenure there between 1970 and 1979, a period referred to as the hey-days of the university whereby black student enrolment increased by large numbers for the first time in the country's history, than for any other aspects of his public service career. His liberal and Western ideology opened the university to many changes, especially the encouragement of women to acquire higher education.

He had a reputation as a no-nonsense leader and administrator who would not entertain any margin for error. He managed the university with an iron fist, and was politically very savvy. As a result, he was liked and loathed by many. He was described in some quarters as brilliant, dedicated, but aloof and out-of-touch in others. Many accused him and former Attorney General Charles Njonjo of being too westernised and out-of-touch with the common African population. This was possibly because most foreign-educated and wealthy people had more interaction with rich, white individuals who were remnants of the colonial era's powerful establishments. But, unlike the former Attorney General Charles Njonjo, Karanja delegated and empowered those below him to take charge. Karanja fiercely guarded the independence of the university, and had the ability to get things done.

In 1993 he was arrested by representatives of the government of President Moi (his former boss), and arraigned in court on charges that he was inciting the public against the government. The charges were bogus since, at the time, he was in frail health and could barely attend parliamentary sessions. The government's heightened paranoia during this time was such that they intimidated those who even thought of challenging the president's government policies. Many opposition politicians were detained without trial, and had their wealth and tax status investigated. Some died in mysterious 'car accidents'. The 1993 arrests of Karanja and others were condemned by many foreign governments including the US, Britain, Germany and Australia. A few weeks later, charges against the arrestees were all dropped for 'lack of evidence'. Many believe President Moi to have caved in to foreign pressure over the incident.

Karanja received a PhD in history from Princeton University in 1962 after completing a doctoral dissertation titled "United States attitude and policy toward the international African Association, 1876–1886."

== Death ==
Karanja died in Nairobi on 28 February 1994 at the age of 63 from cancer.
