= Arthur Magugu =

Kenyan politician

Arthur Kinyanjui Magugu (1934 – 15 September 2012) was a Kenyan politician who served as Minister for Finance from 1982 to 1988. He was a beneficiary of the Kennedy Airlift in 1959. As a KANU MP he represented the Githunguri Constituency from 1969 to 1992, and from 2002 to 2007.
