= Njoroge Mungai =

Kenyan politician

Dr. Njoroge Mungai EGH(Elder of the Golden Heart), MD Medical Doctor
- Born: January 7, 1926; Waithaka, Dagoretti Ctr.
- Died: August 16, 2014 (aged 88); Nairobi, Kenya
- Education: Alliance High School, Thogoto Kikuyu, Class of 1946, University of Fort Hare, previously Fort Hare University, Stanford University, Palo Alto California.
- Occupations: Medical Doctor, Politician, Cabinet Minister for Health, Defence, Foreign Affairs, and Environment, Businessman, Farmer.
- Spouse: Mrs. Njeri Lilian nee Njenga Mūngai 1972 - 1992.
- Children: Ms. Gathoni Florence Mūngai, Ms. Njambi Gathoni Mūngai, Mr. Gii Segeni Mūngai Njoroge, Mrs. Gathoni Kabuki nee Mūngai Anyumba, Mrs. Nyakio Wanjikū nee Mūngai Mwirigi, Mrs. Soila Njambi nee Mūngai Luusa.
- Parent(s): Father: Mr. George Segeni Njoroge, Mother: Mrs. Leah Gathoni nee Kūng'ū Muigai(Magana).
- Family: Mr. Jonathon Mbuchucha, Mrs. Jemimah Thoiya nee Njoroge Gecaga(sister), Mr. James Njane Mūgo, Dr. Njoroge Magana Mūngai, Mr. Ngethe Njoroge, Mr. Nyoike Fredrick Njoroge - brothers. Tom Morello(nephew), Mary Morello(sister-in-law)

Magana Njoroge Mungai, M.D. EGH (January 7, 1926 – August 16, 2014) was a doctor, Politician - Member of Parliament, Kenyan Cabinet Minister, Businessman, Farmer, Nationalist, one of the founding fathers of the Republic of Kenya.

== Early life and education ==
Njoroge Mungai was born in Gichungo village, in Kiambu in colonial Kenya. His parents, Leah Gathoni Kūng'ū and George Segeni Njoroge, were pioneer Christians who attended Church of the Torch which had been founded by the famous Church of Scotland minister, John William Arthur. In fact, John Arthur was the attendant at his birth.

Njoroge Mungai was educated at Alliance High School, Kikuyu, and was part of the famous class of 1946, of which six of its fourteen students were part of Kenya's first cabinet including his good friend and later successor in the Foreign Affairs Ministry Dr. Munyua Waiyaki. After high school, he would work as a bus driver , before joining the British Overseas Airways Corporation. He wanted to travel to the United States to study medicine but was denied a passport by the British authorities; he therefore attended Fort Hare University in South Africa where he studied Hygiene. Thereafter, his dream came true when he was accepted to Stanford Medical School where he graduated in 1957.

== Political life and business activities ==
Njoroge Mungai was a first cousin to Kenya's first President, Jomo Kenyatta. When Kenyatta was arrested, Dr. Njoroge Mungai served as his personal physician, a role he would continue until the President's death. He was intrigued with Kenyatta's political ideology and the ideals of achieving freedom for Kenya. He soon joined the Kenya African National Union, Kenya's freedom party, for which he served as the organization's Secretary. He was part of the Kenya Delegation that negotiated independence from Britain at the Lancaster House Conferences of 1960.

In independent Kenya, Njoroge Mungai would serve first as Minister for Health in which capacity he established Kenya's first medical school. He was later moved to the Defense Ministry and it was during his tenure there that the Shifta War between Kenya and Somalia broke out. He led a mediation team to Kinshasa which resulted in the Arusha declaration of 1967, bringing a close to the conflict. But he would gain fame during his term as Minister for Foreign Affairs. An astute diplomat, he successfully lobbied to have the United Nations Environmental Programme headquartered in Nairobi. He further successfully lobbied the OAU now called AU to supply arms to forces fighting the Apartheid regime in South Africa and the Portuguese colonial regime in Mozambique. Kenya also had a seat on the Security Council during his tenure and he was instrumental in pushing for sanctions against South Africa and Southern Rhodesia. He was with Milton Obote at the Singapore Commonwealth meeting, pushing for the British to cease supplying arms to South Africa, when Idi Amin overthrew the Ugandan President. He famously restrained Obote from returning to Uganda where Obote would have been killed.

In business, Njoroge Mungai had a private clinic at Riruta, Nairobi, among other clinics, all of which he ultimately donated to the government. He would later start the Magana Farm in the 1960s where he practiced dairy farming. In 1973, he expanded his interests to real estate and information technology through Magana Holdings Limited. He would later venture into flower farming and established Magana Flowers Kenya Limited in 1994 on an 18 hectare farm. He served as the Chairman of Servair Investment Airport Kenya Limited and was instrumental in merging the airline catering company, NAS, with the French catering company, Servair, in 2010. In 2016, his name appeared in the Panama Papers data release as a shareholder of Bevatron Ltd, an offshore company with address based in Charlestown, Nevis.

== Personal life ==
Njoroge Mungai was married and the father of six children. In the late 1990s, he was estranged from his wife, Lillian Mungai, and they were engaged in court battles over some of the properties they jointly owned. In the latter years of the Kenyatta Presidency, he controversially led a faction that tried to prevent the vice president Daniel Moi from ascending to the Presidency which would have been unchallenged if Kenyatta died. It was a move that was thwarted by the leader of the Moi faction, AG Charles Njonjo. His opposition to South Africa and British involvement was considered one of the factors that he lost to Njonjo. In 1974, he lost his Parliamentary seat in Dagoretti South but was later nominated as a Member of Parliament. He would rejoin the Cabinet in 1990 as a Minister for Environment before quitting active politics in 1997. In 2002, he came out of retirement to campaign for Uhuru Kenyatta but Uhuru lost that election. However, Uhuru Kenyata would win the presidency eleven years later in 2013.

Njoroge Mungai was honoured with a Commander of The National Order of Merit from the French government in April 2014 for his contribution to business, democracy and international diplomacy. Dr. Njoroge Mungai died on August 14, 2014, at the age of 88 at Nairobi Hospital. At his funeral, Kenya's President, Uhuru Kenyatta, was a pall bearer of his casket in his honour. It is the first and only time a sitting President of Kenya was a pall bearer.
