= Communist Party Marxist – Kenya =

Political party in Kenya

Communist Party Marxist – Kenya Chama Cha Kikomunisti Marxist Kenya
- Abbreviation: CPMK
- Governing body: Central committee (Central Organising Committee)
- General Secretary: Booker Omole
- National Chairperson: Mwaivu Kaluka
- National Vice Chairperson: Mitchelle Anyango
- RWL Secretary: Winnie Obiero
- Founded: 2024
- Split from: Communist Party of Kenya
- Preceded by: Social Democratic Party of Kenya
- Headquarters: Nairobi
- Newspaper: Itikadi
- Student wing: Revolutionary Student Commission
- Youth wing: Revolutionary Youth League
- Women's wing: Revolutionary Women's League
- Ideology: Communism; Marxism–Leninism; Pan-Africanism
- Political position: Far-left
- International affiliation: World Anti-Imperialist Platform; International Meeting of Communist and Workers' Parties; Progressive International; International Coordination of Revolutionary Parties and Organizations; International League of Peoples' Struggle; Sovintern
- Colors: Red, Gold, Black
- Slogan: Jawabu ni Usoshalisti (Socialism is the Answer)
- Anthem: Wimbo wa kimataifa (The Internationale in Kiswahili)

Election symbol
- Star, Hammer, Sickle

Party flag
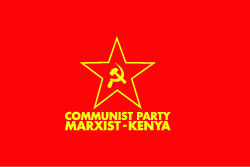

Website
- www.cpmk.org

The Communist Party Marxist – Kenya (CPMK), also known as the Marxist Communist Party of Kenya (MCPK), is an unregistered Marxist-Leninist political party in Kenya that emerged from a split within the Communist Party of Kenya (CPK) in 2024. The split was a result of ongoing ideological divisions within the Communist Party of Kenya itself and wider ongoing strategic differences within the Kenyan left, particularly regarding approaches to socialism and the party's engagement with the country's political landscape.

== History ==
=== As the Communist Party of Kenya ===
==== Formation and early years ====
The Communist Party of Kenya (CPK) was originally founded as the Social Democratic Party (SDP) in 1992 by Johnstone Makau, initially positioning itself as a centre-left political force during the first wave of multi-party elections in Kenya. The party gained national prominence during the 1997 general elections, where its presidential candidate, Charity Ngilu, secured a notable 5th position with 7.9% of the national votes. The party also won 15 seats in the National Assembly. However, after the presidential flag bearer Ngilu left the party in 2001, its performance in the 2002 elections was poor under the leadership of James Orengo. Orengo, who took over as the party's chairman and presidential candidate, received just 0.42% of the vote in the presidential elections and the party also lost all 15 seats in the National Assembly. The same poor performance continued in the 2007 general elections where the party received just 0.41% of the national vote and all 24 candidates who were fielded were unable to secure a win in the National Assembly. After the third repeated failure in the 2013 elections, where the party only received 0.2% of the vote with seven candidates, the party leadership took measures to rectify its dismal performance.

==== Transition to communism ====
After encountering setbacks in the general elections of 2002 and 2007, the party underwent a transformative phase in 2011. Over time, the party experienced significant ideological transformations adapting its ideological orientation from social democracy to communism and political positioning. By the late 2000s, a Marxist–Leninist faction, led by prominent figures such as Mwandawiro Mghanga, Benedict Wachira and Booker Ngesa Omole, began to steer the party towards a socialist trajectory. The faction called for a transformation in Kenya's political landscape, emphasising the need for revolutionary change to address class inequalities, imperialist exploitation, and capitalist oppression in Kenya.

Members of the Young Socialist League, including future leaders Booker Ngesa and Wachira, led a shift towards embracing a fully socialist ideology grounded in Marxism–Leninism in 2013. The SDP leadership of the time, Mutahi Kagwe and Njeri Ndwiga, was replaced. Mwandawiro Mghanga assumed the role of national chairman, with Ngesa and Wachira assuming the key positions of national vice chairperson and secretary general, respectively.

In 2019, the party officially changed its name from the Social Democratic Party to the Communist Party of Kenya, solidifying its commitment to socialist principles after obtaining full registration as a Communist Party. As a registered socialist political party, it became the first socialist party in Kenya since the 1965 constitutional ban by the government of Kenya under sessional paper number 10.

==== Internal crisis of 2022 ====
In April 2022, senior party leaders Benedict Wachira and Mwandawiro Mghanga joined the Kenya Kwanza Alliance, leading to an internal crisis. The Kenya Kwanza faction resolved to expel Booker Omole, the national vice chairman and organising secretary, as he was the most prominent of the senior leaders who questioned and opposed the decision to join the coalition. The national vice chairman appealed the duo's decision with the Political Parties Dispute Tribunal, and the court disallowed it.

The youth league also took the matter to the Political Parties Tribunal, citing Mwandawiro's illegitimacy as chairman. His chairmanship was in question since he was a government employee in the County Government of Taita–Taveta at the time of taking the party to join the Kenya Kwanza Coalition. The youth said that he could not be the chairman as it was contrary to the Constitution of Kenya, which forbids state officials from holding political office. The Youth League wanted the tribunal to nullify his position, which would then nullify his authority to sign up the party into the Kenya Kwanza Coalition. The matter, which remains unresolved, resulted in the effective splintering of the party.

Acknowledging the split as against party policy going into the 2022 elections and citing the ex-chairman's alleged illegitimacy of Mghanga, the central committee reconstituted in September 2022, electing new leaders. The majority reformed, and Kinuthia Ndung’u was elected as the national chairman, Booker Ngesa was reinstated as the national vice chairman and organising secretary, and Sefu Sani was elected as the secretary general.

The Kenya Kwanza-aligned members led by Mghanga and Wachira were declared the minority faction by the majority faction. The faction, unable to take control of the party instruments, created its own website and claimed party leadership.

==== Rectification programme ====
Following the publications of the party's internal reflections in October 2022, the majority faction resolved to address the struggle against revisionism and opportunism that had emerged within the party's leadership during the 2022 general elections. Guided by Marxist–Leninist principles, the party had resolved to maintain its independence, rejecting alliances with bourgeois coalitions dominated by comprador interests. However, a reactionary clique led by Mwandawiro Mghanga and Benedict Wachira violated this line by collaborating with the Kenya Kwanza coalition, betraying the party's revolutionary mission. The maneuver exposed the destructive influence of revisionism, leading to a principled split. Through a rigorous rectification programme, the revolutionary majority faction declared they had rooted out the counter-revolutionary tendencies and re-established unity in thought and action. It served to reaffirm the party's commitment to the revolutionary path, address the Mau Mau rebellion, and reinvigorate the members and the vanguard dedicated to achieving a People's Democratic Revolution and constructing a socialist Kenya.

=== As the Communist Party Marxist – Kenya ===
==== Party split ====
Following the 2022 split, the majority faction of the Communist Party of Kenya, under the leadership of the interim central committee, underwent significant changes. They were advanced and ratified during the party's Second National Congress held in November 2024. The congress was themed "Advancing the National Democratic Revolution for a Truly Independent Socialist Kenya," emphasizing a commitment to socialism and the fight against exploitation and imperialism. This event marked an official renaming of the party to the Communist Party Marxist – Kenya (CPMK).

The reconstitution of the party as the CPMK was ratified during the congress, alongside the introduction of new symbols, including a red star, hammer and sickle, and the colours red and gold for the flag. The party also adopted the Swahili version of the Internationale, Wimbo wa kimataifa, as the official Anthem. The establishment of the Pio Gama Pinto Ideological School was also part of the party's initiative aiming to enhance ideological training and discipline among party members.

== Ideology ==
=== Ideological positions ===
The CPMK positions itself within the Marxist–Leninist tradition, advocating for a revolutionary and class-based struggle to dismantle the capitalist system in Kenya. The party's primary focus is on grassroots mobilization among Kenya's workers and the oppressed, exploited majority. The party has continuously pointed out issues such as economic inequality, land reform, and anti-imperialism, viewing these as key pillars in the fight against the capitalist state.

It also emphasizes the unfinished goals of Kenya's original struggle for independence, especially those espoused by Dedan Kimathi, the leader of the Mau Mau Rebellion against British colonial rule. According to the party, the issues land, food, and freedom have not been adequately addressed since independence, with many Kenyans continuing to suffer from dispossession, hunger, and exploitation. Kimathi was thus adopted as a symbol of the party's struggle for completing Kenya's liberation, particularly concerning land redistribution and sovereignty.

=== Political activities ===
Since its formation, the CPMK has engaged in various political activities aimed at raising awareness about socialism and mobilising disillusioned Kenyans. The party has organized demonstrations, published documents and songs outlining its ideology, and participated in international forums advocating for socialism and anti-imperialism.

One of the party's key mass organizations is its Revolutionary Youth Wing, which mobilises young people around socialist causes, focusing on education, labour rights, and anti-imperialist struggles. The Revolutionary Women's League is another significant structure within the party, addressing gender inequalities and advocating for women's roles in the revolutionary process.

The party has been actively involved in various social and political movements, promoting the rights of workers, peasants, and marginalised communities.

== Leadership ==
=== Central Organising Committee ===
In November 2024, the CPMK delegates elected new leadership under its Central Organising Committee. The leadership team was tasked with guiding the party's political and organizational direction which includes revitalizing party structures and enhancing grassroots engagement, ensuring that the voices of ordinary Kenyans are heard in the fight for socialism while upholding Marxist–Leninist principles. The leadership structure is as follows:

- General Secretary: Booker Omole
- National Chairperson: Mwaivu Kaluka
- National Vice-chairperson: Mitchelle Anyango
- National Organizing Secretary: Clinton Puma Ojiambo
- Secretary of Urban Mass Mobilization: Clinton Ouma Ojiambo
- Secretary of Rural Organizing and Peasants’ Organizations: Leon Munala
- Secretary of Ideology: Walter Nyaluogo
- Secretary of International Affairs: Ashlyn Ajiambo
- General Secretary of RYL: Kiritu Chege
- Secretary of Propaganda: Kirowo George
- Secretary of Women's League: Winnie Obiero

In the restructured party leadership, Omole, previously the National Vice-chairperson, was elected as the new General Secretary. Under his leadership, a Politburo was formed, which serves as the highest decision-making body between Central Organizing Committee meetings.

Omole's tenure as general secretary has been characterized by his commitment to revolutionary tactics and international solidarity with leftist movements worldwide. Omole has been a vocal critic of the Kenyan government and capitalist systems, particularly the administration of President William Ruto, which he has accused of perpetuating authoritarianism, neoliberalism, and capitalist exploitation of the working class.

=== Politburo ===
The Politburo was created to ensure that the CPMK remains aligned with its revolutionary principles while advancing its objectives for a national democratic revolution. The Politburo's responsibilities include strategic leadership, policy development, and ensuring ideological unity within the party.

The members of the CPMK Politburo are Walter Nyaluogo, Booker Ngesa Omole, Kaluka Mwaivu, George Kirowe, Kiritu Chege, and Ashlyn Ajiambo.

== Party publications ==
The party publishes "Itikadi: Socialism, Theory, and Practice," its official magazine, which articulates its ideological perspective on various social, economic, political, and cultural issues. The magazine aims to advance progressive and revolutionary ideals and challenge capitalist narratives. During the 23rd International Meeting of Communist and Workers' Parties in Ismir, Turkey, the CPMK joined SolidNet, a leftist editorial archive.

== Electoral participation ==
The CPMK has actively participated in national elections, strategically engaging in the democratic process. Despite criticism for participating in a system that is fully capitalistic, the party justifies its involvement as a means to actively engage with the masses, promote socialist ideas, and critique the existing capitalist system.

This participation is perceived as a strategic maneuver to access crucial financial resources for the party's growth and organisational development. The party continues to reveal societal contradictions, encourage democratic participation, and work towards achieving political power. The ultimate goal is to achieve political power and establish a socialist state in Kenya. While the party has largely focused on mass mobilization and grassroots activities, it has not been against forming alliances or coalitions with other progressive forces in Kenya, particularly those that align with its socialist agenda.

Following its formation in 1992, the party did not nominate a presidential candidate and received only 177 votes in the National Assembly elections during the 1992 general elections.

During the 1997 general elections, Charity Ngilu was nominated as the presidential candidate. Ngilu finished 5th among the presidential candidates with 7.9% of the national votes, and the party won 15 seats in the National Assembly.

The party's performance in subsequent elections was poor. Challenges with party recognition in national elections and fluctuations in performance in local elections led to several decisions. The first was the decision by the youth wing and revolutionaries within the party to adopt a socialist ideology in 2013 and the decision to ultimately change from the SDP to the CPK in 2019. In 2022, the central committee made a significant decision not to field a presidential candidate or support any coalition leaders in the 2022 presidential race. The party cited ideological conflict and declared both leading coalitions anti-people.
