= Booker Omole =

Kenyan politician

General Secretary of the Communist Party Marxist – Kenya
- Incumbent
- Assumed office November 2024

Personal details
- Born: Gem Constituency, Siaya County
- Party: CPK (before 2024); CPMK (2024–present)
- Education: University of Nairobi, Faculty of Engineering

Booker Ngesa Omole is a Kenyan political activist serving as the general secretary of the Communist Party Marxist – Kenya (CPMK), a position he assumed following the transition of the Communist Party of Kenya (CPK) into the CPMK. Omole was earlier the National Vice Chairperson of CPK, where he influenced the party's evolution and ideological direction.

While serving as General Secretary of the CPMK, Omole has survived a series of violent incidents. On 11 January 2025, he was attacked when 8 armed assailants broke into his home. The Communist Party of Kenya blamed rogue forces linked to the government, but the state police forces denied involvement. Omole's car was also strafed with bullets in April 2025 while carrying Omole and other activists.

In February 2026 Omole was arrested and assaulted by plains-clothes police officers, his hand and arm wounded, and he was initially denied legal counsel. Omole has been kept in reportedly filthy conditions, denied bail, and charged with terrorism, with little comment in the Kenyan press.

== Early life and education ==
Booker Omole was born in the Gem Constituency of Siaya County, a region known for political activism. He attended the University of Nairobi, where he studied engineering. His involvement in student politics laid the foundation for his future in Kenya's socialist movements. He became an early member of the Young Socialist League, actively participating in grassroots mobilisation efforts, which later fed into his role in the Social Democratic Party of Kenya (SDP) before its transformation into a communist organisation.

== Political career ==
=== Communist Party of Kenya ===
Omole helped reorganise the Social Democratic Party (SDP) into the Communist Party of Kenya (CPK) in 2019. This transformation marked a shift in the party's focus toward Marxist–Leninist ideology, aiming to address widespread social inequalities in Kenya and focusing on the struggles of the working class and peasants. Omole advocated for revolutionary tactics and systemic change, calling for a socialist state rooted in Marxism–Leninism.

As the National Vice Chairperson of CPK Omole was involved in protests against economic policies perceived as detrimental to the working class, including the June 2024 Gen Z uprisings protesting the IMF-Finance bill. Omole ran for political office in the 2012 and 2017 elections but was unsuccessful. He was expected to contest in 2022 but faced setbacks, notably his nomination papers being absent from the IEBC nominee list despite active campaigning efforts.

=== Communist Party Marxist – Kenya ===
Following the reconstitution of CPK into CPMK, Omole became its general secretary, and instituted party ideological and organisational changes. CPMK formulated several documents including the People's Program for National Democratic Revolution, describing strategies for transforming Kenya into a socialist state. During the Second National Congress of CPMK, the party's constitution and policies on mass mobilisation were revised. Omole restructured the Revolutionary Youth League and Women's League, emphasising scientific leadership and evaluating party cadres based on their ideological contributions.

== Ideological contributions ==
Booker Omole advocates for dismantling capitalist structures to establish a socialist state in Kenya, emphasising the need for revolutionary change to address social inequalities and empower the working class.

As a Kenyan lead Marxist–Leninist, Omole's writings through the CPMK critically analyse bourgeois politics advocate socialism's potential role in addressing economic inequalities in Kenya.

== Legal issues ==
Omole has been involved in several legal cases and charges related to his role as a former student leader and political figure.

=== 2014 felony, disturbances, unlawful weapons and violent robbery charges ===
On 9 April 2014, during the Student Organization of Nairobi University (SONU) elections, Omole and eleven other students were arrested after gunshots were reportedly heard at the Lower Kabete campus of the University of Nairobi, amidst heightened tensions due to contested student elections. The police said that they found a Glock pistol registered to Omole, as well as other weapons, including swords and pangas. The group was charged with multiple offenses under the Kenyan Penal Code, The students pled not guilty; Omole and the other defendants were acquitted of all charges by the Nairobi court after the prosecution failed to produce witnesses in the case.

=== 2021 defamation of Elisha Ochieng Odhiambo ===
Omole was sued for defamation in 2020 by Elisha Ochieng Odhiambo, a Member of Parliament for Gem Constituency. Omole had claimed that Odhiambo had misappropriated KES 1,000,000 that was allocated for the construction of an administration block at the Masinde Primary School.

On 28 July 2021, the High Court ruled in favor of Elisha Ochieng Odhiambo, stating that Omole had defamed the Odhiambo with malice, and ordered Omole to pay general damages of Kshs 5,000,000; aggravated damages of Kshs 1,000,000 in restitution for defamation. Omole was also ordered to pay for the costs of the suit and interest on the awarded amounts from the date of the judgement until full payment. Additionally, the court issued a permanent injunction barring Omole from making any further defamatory statements about Odhiambo and the NG-CDF at Masinde Primary School.

=== 2024 detention and release ===
On 7 September 2024, Omole was arrested at Jomo Kenyatta International Airport while travelling to Beijing. This detention was widely viewed as politically motivated due to his outspoken opposition to President William Ruto's government, which he has accused of authoritarianism and human rights violations.

The Communist Party of Kenya (CPK) denounced Omole's arrest as illegal and politically motivated, asserting that he was on an official assignment when detained. The party emphasised that Omole's activism and leadership represent a direct challenge to the ruling government's authority, which they claim is characterised by fear and repression. In his autobiographical work, Communist Party of Kenya and Manifestations of Class Struggle in Kenya, Omole articulates the struggles faced by the Kenyan people under a regime dominated by a wealthy elite, stating: “Kenya is a dictatorship, with a few wealthy people dominating all spheres of life. Capital is the dominating factor; with money, everything is for sale! Even people!”

Omole was released; his arrest was part of a broader government crackdown on leftist activists in Kenya. Following his release, police raided his home on 11 September. This escalated concerns about state harassment against political activists amid ongoing repression of dissenting voices. His arrest garnered attention from international leftist groups and human rights organisations, which condemned the action as an attempt to suppress dissent. His case has drawn solidarity from various national and international organisations advocating for his freedom and the protection of political rights in Kenya. The CPMK states that Omole's experiences reflect the broader context of political repression in Kenya, where leftist leaders face significant risks for their activism.

=== Violent attacks on Omole and CPMK leadership ===
On 2 April 2025, Omole and fellow party members were riding in Omole's car when the car was suddenly strafed with bullets. The attack occurred along the Nakuru-Nairobi Highway. The CPMK described this attack as part of a pattern of deliberate repression, saying that a police vehicle was present at the scene but failed to intervene until nearly 30 minutes after the attack, allowing the assailants to escape unchallenged.

On 11 January 2025 according to the CPMK, Omole survived an assassination attempt when 8 armed men broke into his home. The state police forces denied involvement, saying it was a robbery. Omole described that the attackers seized his sister and demanded to find him, and the confrontation ended when the attackers found Omole, who defended himself with a firearm.

=== February 2026 Arrest ===
Omole was arrested in the town of Isiolo by Kenyan police on 24 February 2026 in what the CPM-K’s Central Committee described as a kidnapping. According to an official statement of the CPM-K, “Booker is accused of attempting to kill the police, assaulting the police and having connections with the now jailed President of Venezuela Nicolás Maduro in the US drug cartel, this is as a result of organising a demonstration at the US Embassy demanding the release of Nicolás Maduro.” They additionally report that no warrant or reason for arrest was provided at the time of Omole’s arrest and that during the process the police broke one of his teeth and cut his finger with a pen knife. He has also been charged with illegal firearms possession, despite being a licensed owner of the gun that Omole used to defend himself in the January 2025 assassination attempt.

== Public speaking and advocacy ==
Omole speaks on issues such as corruption, social justice, anti-imperialism, and international solidarity. His speeches connect local struggles of poverty, exploitation, corruption, and police brutality with global movements advocating for revolutionary change, anti-imperialism, and solidarity among working-class movements. He frequently appears as a pundit on platforms like Citizen TV, KTN and K24, articulating the struggles faced by Kenya's working class.

Omole has also been a critic of Western imperialism, aligning himself with the Global South while expressing admiration for China's development model as an alternative path for African nations seeking to escape neo-colonial exploitation.

In August 2026 the German Communist Party (DKP) invited the Kenyan Communist Party General Secretary Omole to speak about the situation in Africa and Cuba’s significance for the continent at the Unsere Zeit Peace Days in Berlin. The DKP was founded in 1968 in response to the 1956 ban on the KPD, it is a small party with just around 2,700 members, and is therefore politically largely irrelevant in Germany. Discussions were intended to cover the developments in the struggle against Western imperialism and neocolonialism alongside participants from Germany and many other countries around the world. Following weeks of delays Germany's foreign ministry denied entry to Omole.
