= Zack Kìnùthia =

Nairobi minister of sport (2020–2022)

- Born: 10 July 1988 (age 38); Murang'a County
- Education: University of Nairobi
- Occupation: Former Chief Administrative Secretary
- Title: Hon.
- Children: 2

Zachariah Kìnùthia (born 10 July 1988), known as Zack Kìnùthia, served as the Chief Administrative Secretary of the Kenyan Ministry of Sports, Culture, and Heritage from January 2020 until his resignation in February 2022. He previously served as chairman of the Student's Organization of Nairobi University (SONU).

== Early life and education ==
Zack Kìnùthia was born to Lucy Mugure in Marumī village, Kigumo Ward, Murang'a County in Gatitu Constituency. He is a member of the Kikuyu tribe, a Bantu ethnic group. He attended Kigumo Primary School in his home county and later attended Gaichanjiru High School in Murang'a County.

In 2010, he enrolled at the University of Nairobi to pursue a bachelor's degree in economics and political science. While at the University of Nairobi, he became involved in student politics and was elected chairman of the Students' Organization of Nairobi University (SONU). He also served as a leader in the Christian Union. As of 2023, Kìnùthia is pursuing a law degree.

== Career ==
At the University of Nairobi, Kìnùthia served as the elected chairman of the student organization from 2013 to 2014. He was also a member of the Christian Union and held a leadership role in 2013.

In 2013, Kìnùthia joined the presidential campaign team of candidate Uhuru Kenyatta. He later participated in the formation of the Jubilee Party and President Uhuru's re-election youth campaign.

In 2014, after graduating from the University of Nairobi with his bachelor's degree, Kìnùthia worked as a research assistant at a community project focused on the fight against HIV/AIDS in Kenya, an initiative of the University of Nairobi known as Central Kenya Response – Integration, Strengthening and Sustainability plus Project (CRISSP).

Kìnùthia was appointed as the Chief Administrative Secretary (CAS) for Education on 15 January 2020, by President Uhuru Kenyatta, alongside Mumina Bonaya. Kìnùthia was the first person appointed to this specific position under President Kenyatta and the second person overall to hold it after Prof. Collete A. Suda, Ph.D. He was the youngest person serving in that position at the time of his appointment. Kìnùthia stated that he had no prior knowledge of his appointment and first heard of it when President Uhuru announced it on the radio. He was sworn in on 17 January 2020, at the State House in the presence of Education Cabinet Secretary Prof. George Magoha. He reportedly cut his hair short before being sworn in.

Kìnùthia was later transferred to the Ministry of Sports, Culture, and Heritage. In February 2022, he resigned from the CAS position in the Ministry of Sports, Culture, and Heritage to contest the Kigumo parliamentary seat under the Party of National Unity. He lost the election to Joseph Munyoro of UDA, receiving 10,543 votes to Munyoro's 27,213 votes.
