= Hammer and sickle =

Symbol of communism

The hammer and sickle symbol

The hammer and sickle (Unicode: U+262D ☭ HAMMER AND SICKLE) is a communist symbol that represents unity between workers and peasants. (Note: Specifically, the hammer represents the industrial workers (the proletariat), while the sickle represents agricultural workers.) It was designed in 1918 by Yevgeny Kamzolkin and adopted during the Russian Revolution at the end of World War I. After the Russian Civil War, the hammer and sickle became more widely used as a symbol for labor within the Soviet Union (USSR) and for international proletarian unity. It was taken up by many communist movements around the world, some with local variations. The hammer and sickle, or variations of it, remain commonplace in communist states, such as China, Cuba, Laos, North Korea, and Vietnam, but also some former Soviet republics following the dissolution of the Soviet Union, such as Belarus and Russia. Some countries have imposed bans on communist symbols, where the display of the hammer and sickle is prohibited.

== History ==
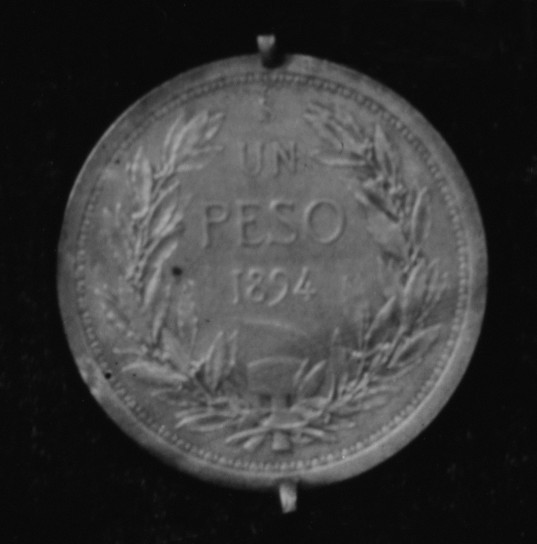
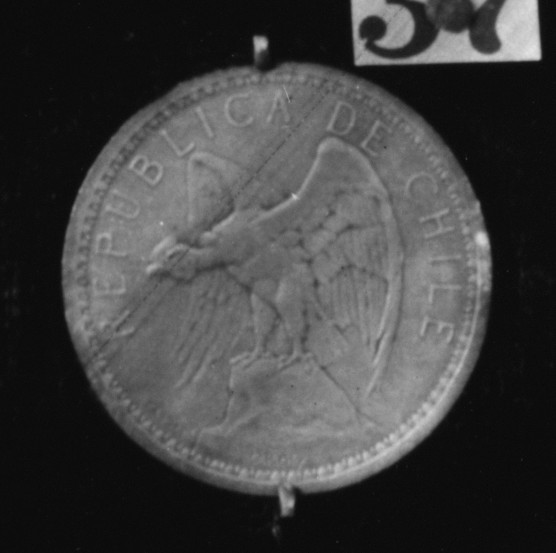
The Chilean peso coin used the hammer and sickle symbol over a wreath between 1894 and 1940, as designed by Louis-Oscar Roty
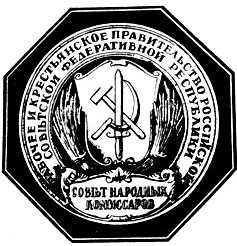
A proposed Soviet emblem with a sword included with the hammer and sickle, said to be rejected by Vladimir Lenin (left); the hammer and sickle with a red star commonly used in Soviet heraldry (center); insignia of the Order of the Patriotic War (right)

=== Worker symbolism ===
One example of hammer-and-sickle symbolism prior to its political instrumentalization by the Soviet Union is found in Chilean currency circulating since 1894.

=== Inception ===
In 1918, Yevgeny Ivanovich Kamzolkin designed a 'hammer and sickle' symbol as a decoration for the May Day celebrations in the Zamoskvorechye District of Moscow. It originally featured a sword, but Lenin objected, disliking the militaristic connotations. On 6 July 1923, the 2nd session of the Central Executive Committee (CIK) adopted the emblem.

In 1919, the new Republic of Austria introduced a sickle and a hammer to its coat of arms, one in each talon of its supporting eagle, to represent the farming and industrial classes. They were removed in 1934 with the establishment of the Fascist Federal State of Austria and returned in 1945 after the defeat of Nazi Germany (which had absorbed Austria in 1938) in the Second World War.

In his work, Daily Life in a Crumbling Empire: The Absorption of Russia into the World Economy, sociologist David Lempert hypothesizes that the hammer and sickle symbol served as a secular replacement for the patriarchal cross.

=== Use in Soviet Union ===
- The State Emblem of the Soviet Union and the Coats of Arms of the Soviet Republics showed the hammer and sickle, which also appeared on the red star badge on the uniform cap of the Red Army uniform and in many other places.
- Serp i Molot (transliteration of Russian: cерп и молот, "sickle and hammer") is the name of the Moscow Metallurgical Plant.
- Serp i Molot is also the name of a stop on the electric railway line from Kurski railway station in Moscow to Gorky, featured in Venedikt Yerofeyev's novel, Moscow-Petushki.

== Meaning ==
At the time of creation, the hammer and sickle stood for worker-peasant alliance, with the hammer a traditional symbol of the industrial proletariat (who dominated the proletariat of Russia) and the sickle a traditional symbol for the peasantry, but the meaning has since broadened to a globally recognizable symbol for Marxism, communist parties, or socialist states.

== Current usage ==
=== Post-Soviet states ===
Two federal subjects of the post-Soviet Russian Federation use the hammer and sickle in their symbols: the Vladimir Oblast has them on its flag and the Bryansk Oblast has them on its flag and coat of arms, which is also the central element of its flag. In addition, the Russian city of Oryol also uses the hammer and sickle on its flag.

The former Soviet (now Russian) national airline, Aeroflot, continues to use the hammer and sickle in its symbol.

Flag of Transnistria

The de facto government of Transnistria uses (with minor modifications) the flag and the emblem of the former Moldavian SSR, which includes the hammer and sickle. The flag can also appear without the hammer and sickle in some circumstances, for example on Transnistrian-issued license plates, military uniforms, and money.

=== Communist parties ===
Three out of the five currently ruling Communist parties use a hammer and sickle as the party symbol: the Chinese Communist Party, the Communist Party of Vietnam and the Lao People's Revolutionary Party. In Laos and Vietnam, the hammer and sickle party flags can often be seen flying side by side with their respective national flags.

Many communist parties around the world also use it, including the Communist Party of Greece, the Communist Party of Argentina, the Communist Party of Chile, both the Communist Party of Brazil and the Brazilian Communist Party, the Communist Party of Bangladesh, the Communist Party of Sri Lanka, the Communist Party of India (Marxist), the Communist Party of India (Marxist–Leninist) Liberation, the Communist Party of India, the Communist Party of India (Maoist), the Indian Communist Marxist Party, the Socialist Unity Centre of India (Communist), the Egyptian Communist Party, the Communist Party of Pakistan, the Communist Refoundation Party in Italy, the Communist Party of Spain, the Communist Party of Denmark, the Communist Party of Norway, the Romanian Communist Party, the Lebanese Communist Party, the Communist Party of the Philippines and the Shining Path. The Communist Party of Sweden, the Portuguese Communist Party and the Mexican Communist Party use the hammer and sickle imposed on the red star.

== Variations ==
Flag of Angola

Flag of Mozambique

Many symbols having structures and messages similar to the original have been designed. For example, the Angolan flag shows a segment of a cog, crossed by a machete and crowned with a socialist star, while the flag of Mozambique features an AK-47 crossed by a hoe. In the logo of the Communist Party USA, a circle is formed by a half cog and a semicircular sickle-blade. A hammer is laid directly over the sickle's handle, with the hammer's head at the logo's center. The logo of the Communist Party of Turkey consists of half a cog wheel crossed by a hammer, with a star on the top.

Tools represented in other designs include: the brush, sickle and hammer of the Workers' Party of Korea; the spade, flaming torch and quill used prior to 1984 by the British Labour Party; the pickaxe and rifle used in communist Albania; and the hammer and compasses of the East German emblem and flag. The Far Eastern Republic of Russia used an anchor crossed over a spade or pickaxe, symbolising the union of the fishermen and miners. The Fourth International, founded by Leon Trotsky, uses a hammer and sickle symbol on which the number 4 is superimposed. The hammer and sickle in the Fourth International symbol are the opposite of other hammer and sickle symbols in that the head of the hammer is on the right side and the sickle end tip on the left. The Trotskyist League for the Fifth International merges a hammer with the number 5, using the number's lower arch to form the sickle. A sickle with a rifle is also used by the People's Mojahedin of Iran.

The Communist Party of Britain uses the hammer and dove symbol. Designed in 1988 by Michal Boncza, it is intended to highlight the party's connection to the peace movement. It is usually used in conjunction with the hammer and sickle, and it appears on all of the CPB's publications. Some members of the CPB prefer one symbol over the other, although the party's 1994 congress reaffirmed the hammer and dove's position as the official emblem of the party. Similarly, the Communist Party of Israel uses a dove over the hammer and sickle as its symbol. The flag of the Guadeloupe Communist Party uses a sickle, turned to look like a majuscule G, to represent Guadeloupe.

In 1938, the Dobama Asiayone, an anti-British nationalist group in the then British Burma, adopted a tricolour flag charged with a red sickle and hammer. From 1974–2010, the flag of Burma (Myanmar) featured a bushel of rice superimposed on a cogwheel surrounded by fourteen white stars; the rice representing the peasants and the cogwheel representing the workers, the combination symbolizing that the peasants and workers be the two basic social classes for State building, while the fourteen equal-sized white stars indicate the unity and equality of fourteen member states of the Union.

The flag of Chama Cha Mapinduzi (CCM, Party of the Revolution in Swahili), currently the ruling political party of Tanzania, has a slightly different symbol with a hammer and a hoe (jembe) instead of a sickle to represent the most common farm tool in Africa.

The symbols of the liberal socialist parties of Radical Civic Union in Argentina and the Czech National Social Party in the Czech Republic feature a hammer and a quill, with the former representing workers and the latter representing clerks.

The election symbol of the Communist Party of India consists of a horizontal sickle, vertically crossed by Ears of Corn in the center.

== Art ==
The hammer and sickle has long been a common theme in socialist realism, but it has also seen some depiction in non-Marxist popular culture. Andy Warhol who created many drawings and photographs of the hammer and sickle is the most famous example of this.

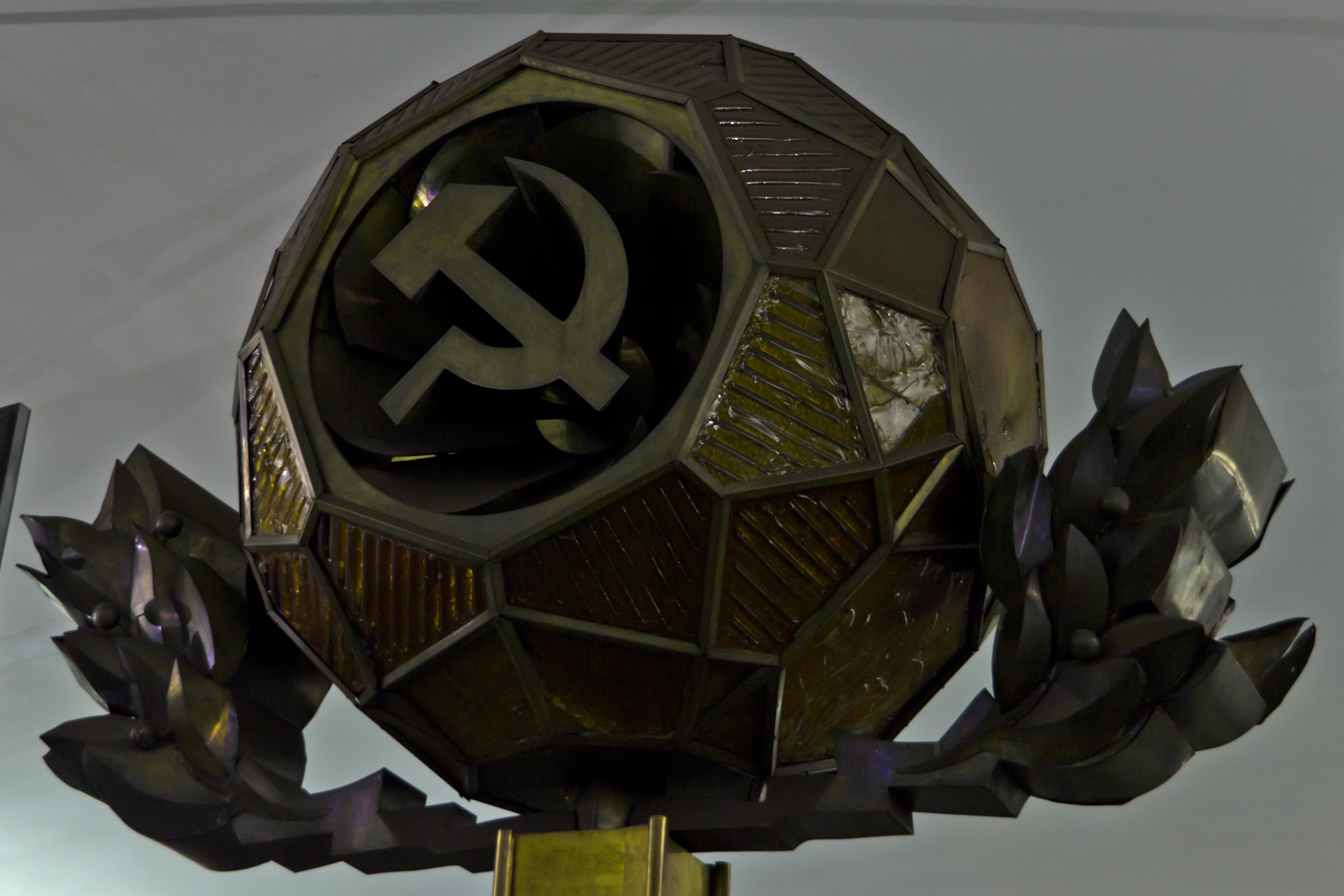
The metro station, Plošča Lienina, Minsk

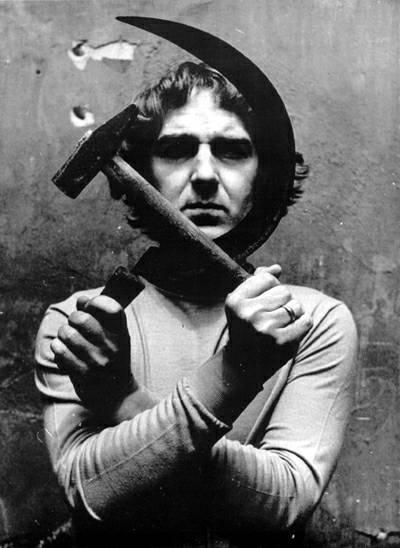
Sándor Pinczehelyi, Hammer and Sickle

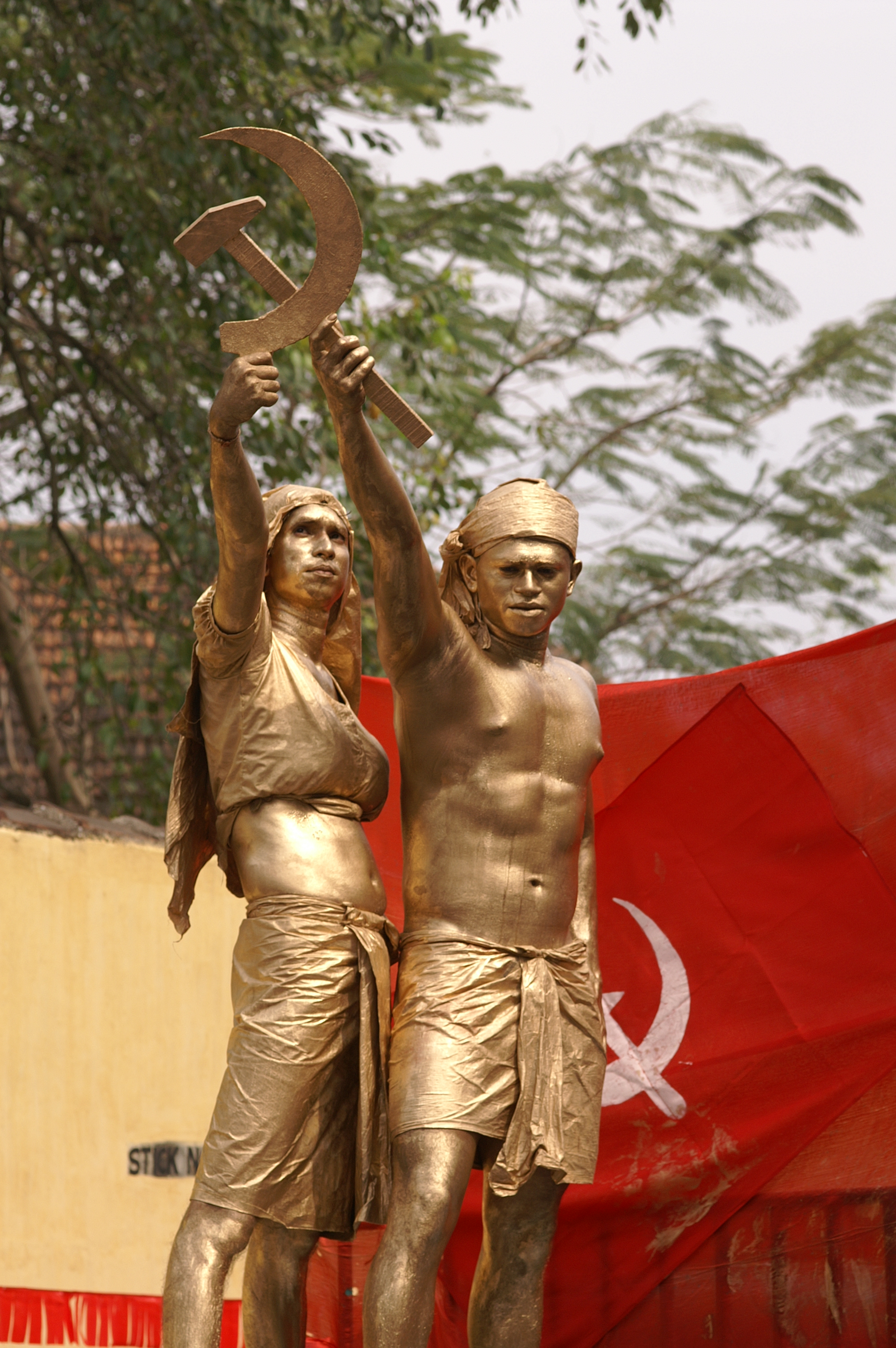
A tableau in a communist rally in Kerala, India

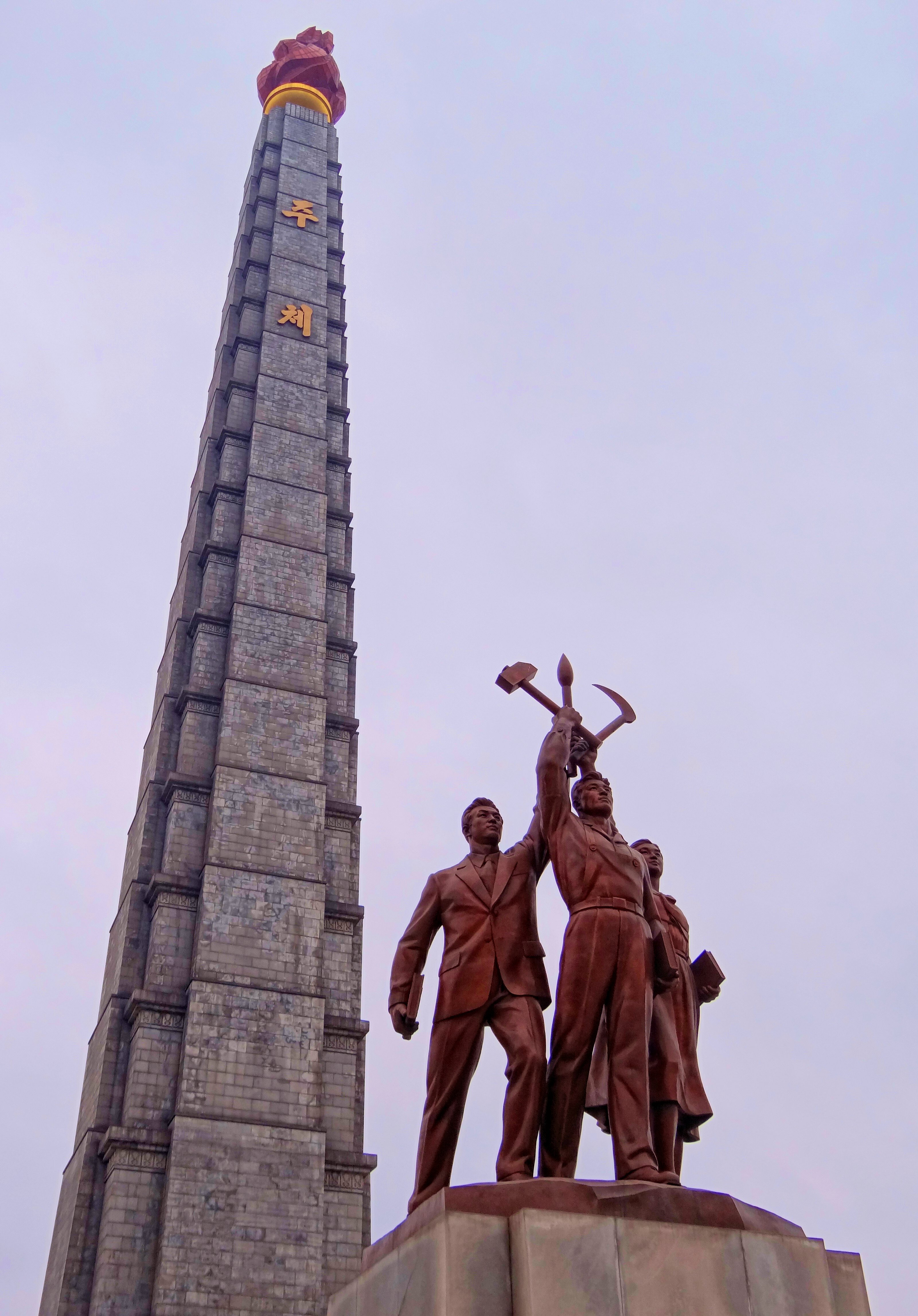
"Worker, peasant and the intellectual" in front of the Juche Tower, Pyongyang

The Hoof and Horn flag described in the book Animal Farm is a parody of the hammer and sickle

== Legal status ==
In several countries in the former Eastern Bloc, there are laws that define the hammer and sickle as the symbol of a "totalitarian and criminal ideology" and the public display of the hammer and sickle and other Communist symbols such as the red star is considered a criminal offence. Georgia, Hungary, Latvia, Lithuania, Moldova (1 October 2012 – 4 June 2013) and Ukraine have banned communist symbols including this one. A similar law was considered in Estonia, but it eventually failed in a parliamentary committee. In Ukraine, the legislature equates communist symbols including hammer with sickle to Nazi swastika symbols.

In 2010, the Lithuanian, Latvian, Bulgarian, Hungarian, Romanian, and Czech governments called for the European Union to criminalize "the approval, denial or belittling of communist crimes" similar to how a number of EU member states have banned Holocaust denial. The European Commission turned down this request, finding after a study that the criteria for EU-wide criminal legislation were not met, leaving individual member states to determine the extent to which they wished to handle past totalitarian crimes.

In February 2013, the Constitutional Court of Hungary annulled the ban on the use of symbols of fascist and communist dictatorships, including the hammer and sickle, the red star and the swastika, saying the ban was too broad and imprecise. The court also pointed to a judgement of the European Court of Human Rights in which Hungary was found guilty of violation of article 10, the right to freedom of expression. In June 2013, the Constitutional Court of Moldova ruled that the Moldovan Communist Party's symbols—the hammer and sickle—are legal and can be used.

In Indonesia, the display of communist symbols is banned and the country's Communist party was also banned by decree of president Suharto, following the 1965–1966 killings of communists in which over 500,000 people were killed. In January 2018, an activist protesting against Bumi Resources displayed the hammer and sickle, was accused of spreading communism, and later jailed.

In Poland, dissemination of items which are "media of fascist, communist or other totalitarian symbolism" was criminalized in 1997. However, the Constitutional Tribunal found this sanction to be unconstitutional in 2011.

== Usage gallery ==
=== Flags ===
==== Europe and Russia/Soviet Union ====
===== Current =====
Flag of the Communist Party of the Russian Federation

Flag of the Communists of Russia

Flag of the United Communist Party (Russia)

Flag of the Russian Communist Workers' Party of the Communist Party of the Soviet Union

Flag of the SERB (Russia)

Flag of Bryansk Oblast (Russia)

Flag of Vladimir Oblast (Russia)

Flag of Oryol (Russia)

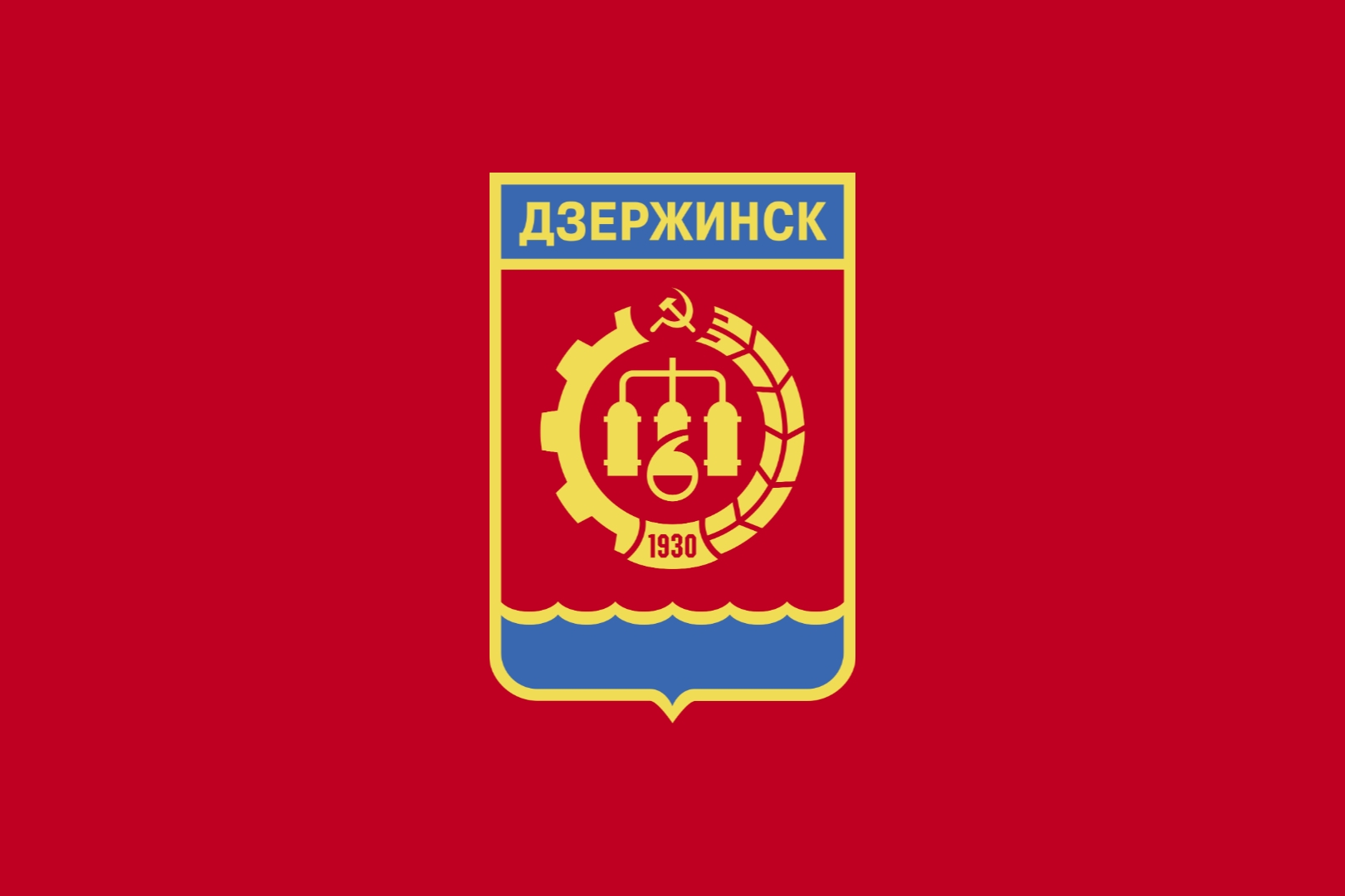
Flag of Dzerzhinsk (Russia)

Flag of Transnistria

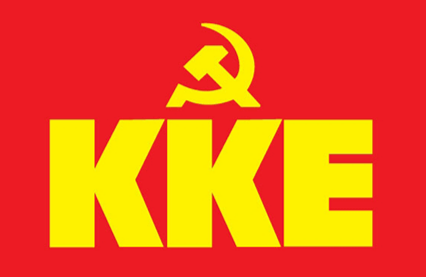
Flag of the Communist Party of Greece

Flag of the Communist Refoundation Party (Italy)

Flag of the Communist Party of Ireland

Flag of the Portuguese Communist Party

Flag of the Maoist Communist Party (Turkey)

Flag of the Revolutionary People's Liberation Party–Front (Turkey)

Flag of the Communist Party of Britain

Flag of the Communist Party of Great Britain (Marxist–Leninist)

===== Former =====
Flag of the Soviet Union from 1922 to November 1923

Flag of the Soviet Union from November 1923 to April 1924

Flag of the Soviet Union from April 1924 to December 1936

Flag of the Soviet Union from December 1936 to 1955

Flag of the Soviet Union from 19 August 1955 to 26 December 1991

Naval Jack of the Soviet Union and Russia from 16 November 1950 to 26 July 1992

Naval ensign of the Soviet Union and Russia from 16 November 1950 to 26 July 1992

Flag of Aeroflot from 1961 to 1991

Flag of the Russian SFSR from 1954 to 1991

Flag of the Ukrainian SSR from 1950 to 1992

Flag of the Byelorussian SSR from 1951 to 1991

Flag of the Uzbek SSR from 1952 to 1991

Flag of the Kazakh SSR from 1953 to 1992

Flag of the Georgian SSR from 1951 to 1990

Flag of the Azerbaijani SSR from 1956 to 1991

Flag of the Lithuanian SSR from 1953 to 1988

Flag of the Moldavian SSR from 1952 to 1990

Flag of the Latvian SSR from 1953 to 1990

Flag of the Kirghiz SSR from 1952 to 1992

Flag of the Tajik SSR from 1953 to 1991

Flag of the Armenian SSR from 1952 to 1990

Flag of the Turkmen SSR from 1953 to 1992

Flag of the Estonian SSR from 1953 to 1990

Flag of the Karelo-Finnish SSR from 1953 to 1956

Flag of the Communist Party of the Donetsk People's Republic

Flag of the Decommunization (Russia)

Flag of the Romanian Communist Party

Flag of the National Bolshevik Party

Flag of Communist Party of Czechoslovakia

Flag of the Communist Party of Germany

Reverse side of the Communist Party of Germany flag

Flag of East Germany from 1959 to 1990

Flag of the Italian Communist Party

Flag of the Sammarinese Communist Party

Flag of the League of Communists of Yugoslavia

==== Asia and Oceania except Russia/Soviet Union ====
===== Current =====
Flag of the Vietnamese Communist Party

Flag of the Chinese Communist Party

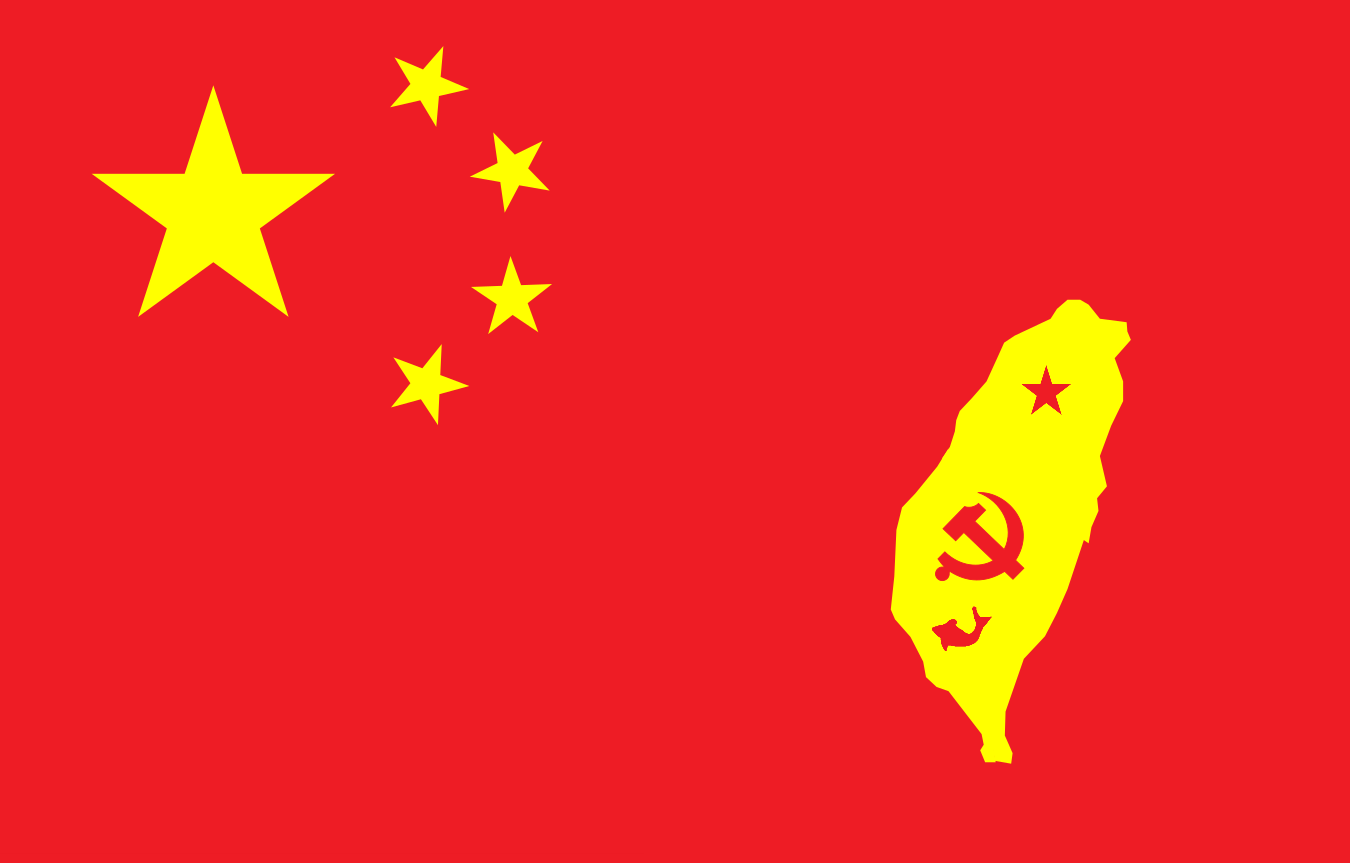
Flag of the Taiwan People's Communist Party

Flag of the Workers' Party of Korea

Flag of the Communist Party of India

Flag of the Communist Party of India (Marxist)

Flag of various South Asian communist parties, including the Communist Party of India (Maoist)

Flag of the Socialist Unity Centre of India

Flag of the Communist Party of Bangladesh

Flag of the Communist Party of Bhutan (Marxist–Leninist–Maoist)

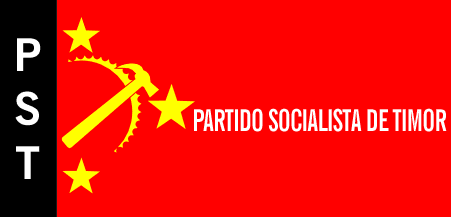
Flag of the Socialist Party of Timor

Flag of the Communist Party of the Philippines

Flag of the Lao People's Revolutionary Party

Flag of the Lebanese Communist Party

Flag of the Syrian Communist Party (Bakdash)

Flag of the Jordanian Communist Party

Flag of the Palestinian Communist Party

===== Former =====
Flag of the Chinese Communist Party (before 1996)

Flag of Chinese Workers' and Peasants' Red Army

Flag of the Taiwan Democratic Communist Party

Flag of the Chinese Soviet Republic (1931–1937)

Flag of various South Asian communist parties, including the Communist Party of India (Maoist)

Flag of the Communist Mazdoor Kissan Party

Flag of the Nepal Communist Party

Flag of Communist Party of Indonesia

Flag of the Communist Party of Kampuchea

Flag of the Malayan Communist Party (1930–1989)

Flag of the Kurdistan Workers' Party (1978–1995)

==== Africa ====
===== Current =====
Flag of Angola

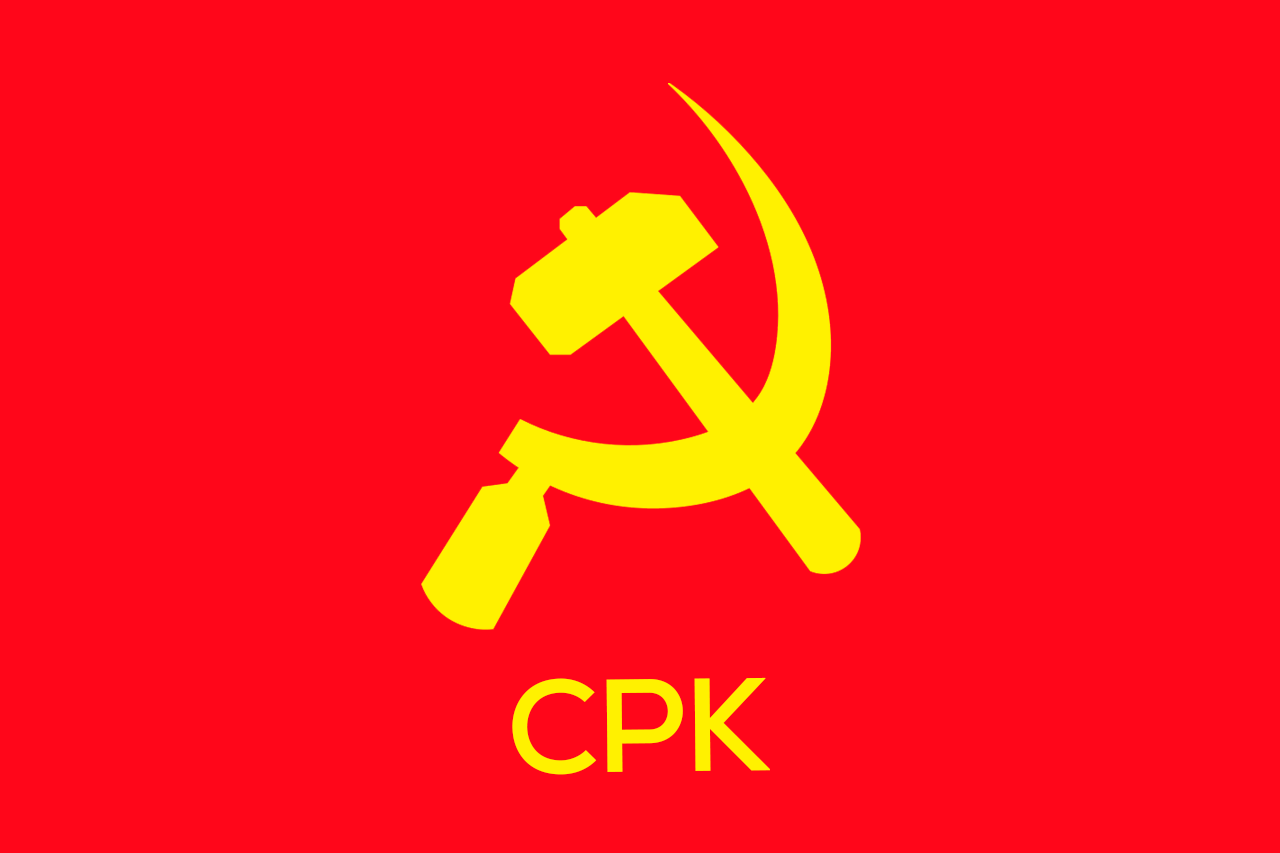
Flag of the Communist Party of Kenya

Flag of the South African Communist Party

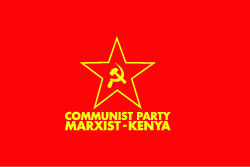
Flag of the Communist Party Marxist – Kenya

Flag of the Communist Party of Swaziland

Flag of the People's Republic of the Congo and the Congolese Party of Labour

===== Former =====
Flag of the Algerian Communist Party

Flag of FRELIMO (1987–2004)

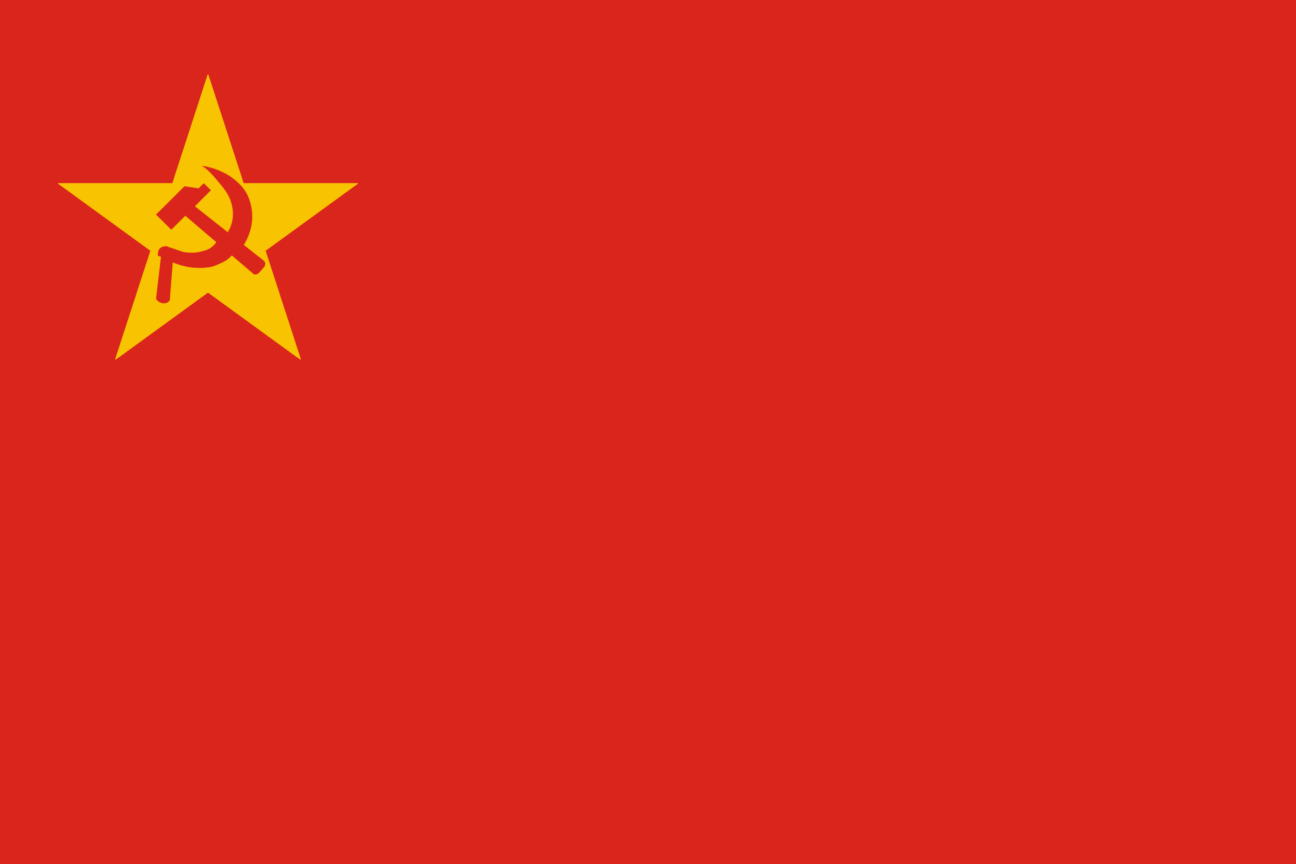
Flag of the Workers' Party of Ethiopia

==== Americas ====
===== Current =====
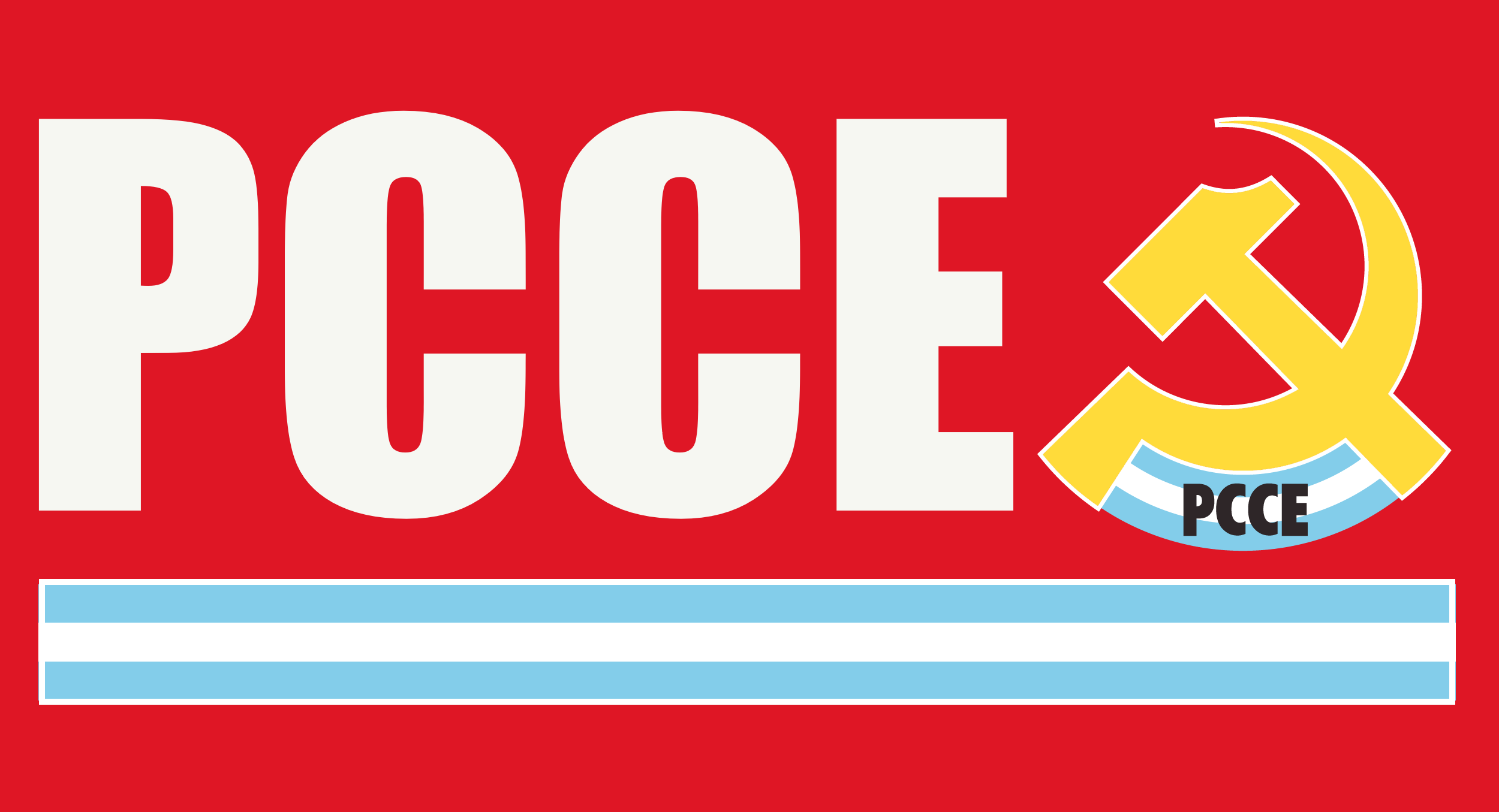
Flag of the PCCE

Flag of the PCB

Flag of the PCdoB

Flag of the Workers' Cause Party (Brazil)

Flag of the Communist Party of Chile

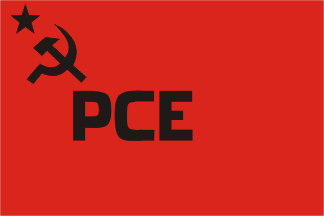
Flag of the Communist Party of Ecuador

Flag of the Shining Path (Peru)

Flag of the Communist Party USA

Flag of the Revolutionary Communist Party (Argentina)

=== State emblems ===
==== Soviet Union (in the constitutional order) ====
State emblem of the Union of Soviet Socialist Republics

Emblem of the Russian Soviet Federative Socialist Republic

Emblem of the Russian Federation (1992‒1993)

Emblem of the Ukrainian Soviet Socialist Republic

Emblem of the Byelorussian Soviet Socialist Republic

Emblem of the Uzbek Soviet Socialist Republic

Emblem of the Kazakh Soviet Socialist Republic

Emblem of the Georgian Soviet Socialist Republic

Emblem of the Azerbaijan Soviet Socialist Republic

Emblem of the Lithuanian Soviet Socialist Republic

Emblem of the Moldavian Soviet Socialist Republic

Emblem of the Latvian Soviet Socialist Republic

Emblem of the Kirghiz Soviet Socialist Republic

Emblem of the Tajik Soviet Socialist Republic

Emblem of the Turkmen Soviet Socialist Republic

Emblem of the Estonian Soviet Socialist Republic

Emblem of the Transcaucasian Socialist Federative Soviet Republic (1923‒1936)

Emblem of the Karelo-Finnish Soviet Socialist Republic (1941‒1956)

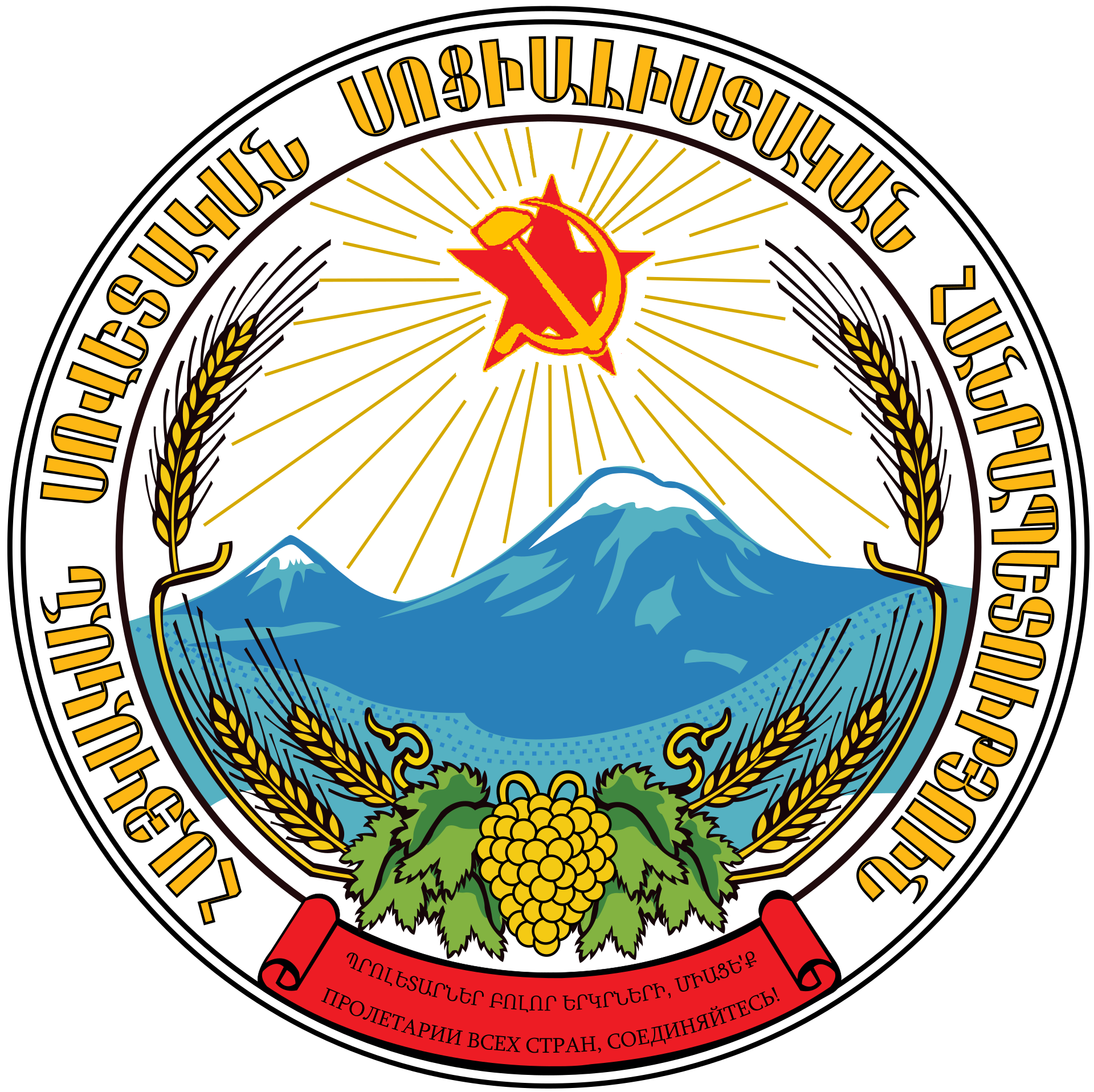
Emblem of the Armenian Soviet Socialist Republic

==== Other ====
===== Current =====
Emblem of the self-proclaimed Pridnestrovian Moldavian Republic

Emblem of Angola

Coat of arms of Bryansk Oblast, Russia

===== Former =====
National emblem of the German Democratic Republic (1955–1990)

State emblem of the Tuvan People's Republic (1943‒1944)

State emblem of the Lao People's Democratic Republic (1975‒1991)

Emblem of the People's Republic of the Congo (1970–1991)

State emblem of the Chinese Soviet Republic (1934–1937)

Emblem of Hungarian People's Republic (1949–1956)

Emblem of Moscow (1924–1937)

=== Logos ===
==== Europe ====
Current

Logo of the Communist Party of the Russian Federation

Logo of the Communist Party of Greece

Logo of the Communist Party (Italy)

Logo of the Communist Party of Spain

Logo of the Portuguese Communist Party

Logo of the Communist Party of Ireland

Logo of the Communist Party of Britain

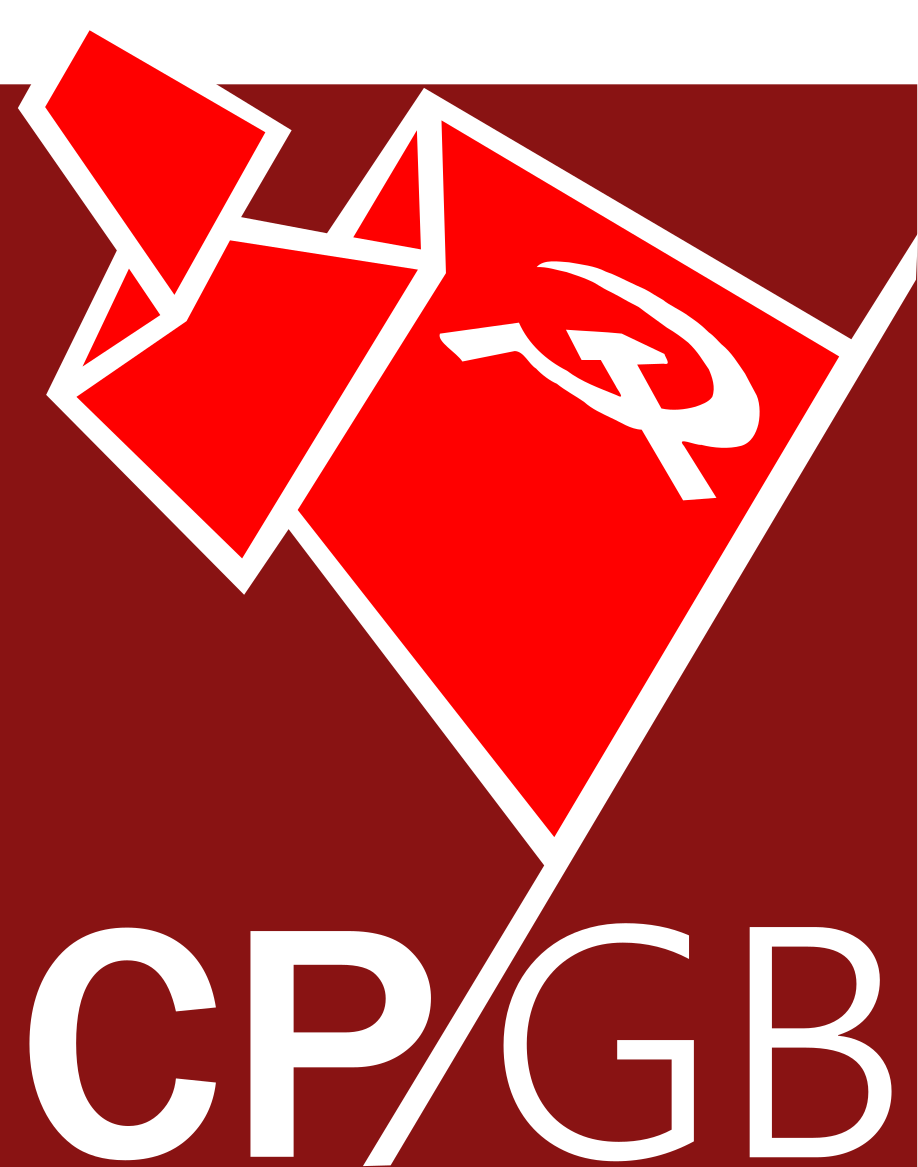
Logo of the Communist Party of Great Britain (Provisional Central Committee)

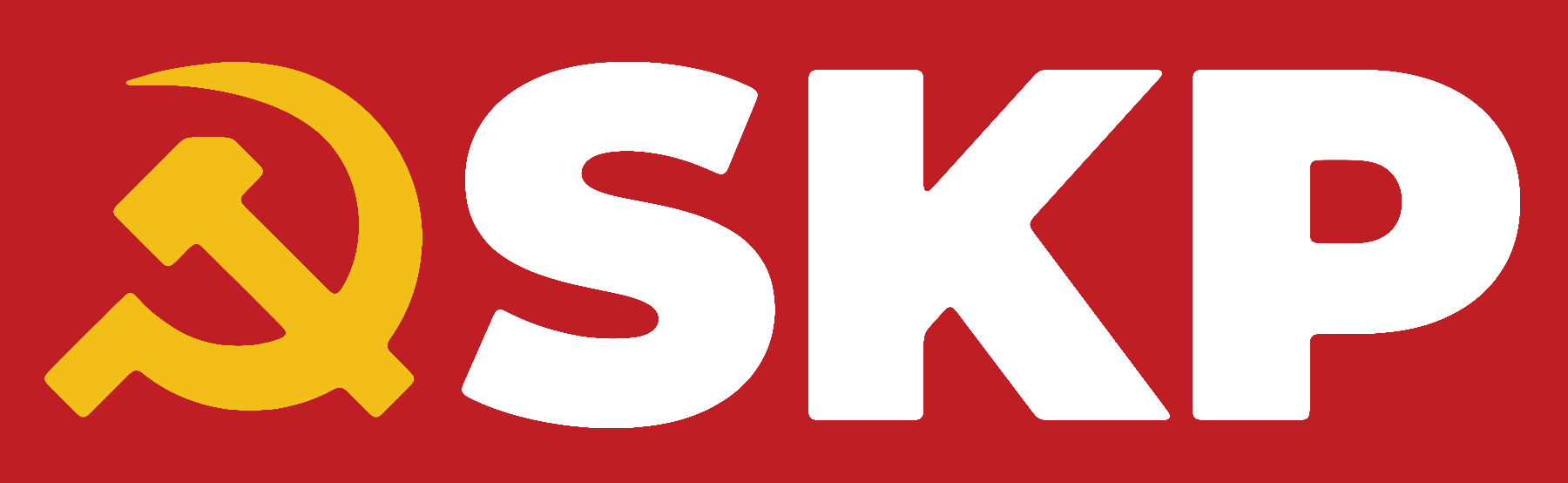
Logo of the Communist Party of Sweden (1995)

The Logo of the Communist Party of Norway

Logo of the Communist Party of Denmark

Logo of the Communist Party (Denmark)

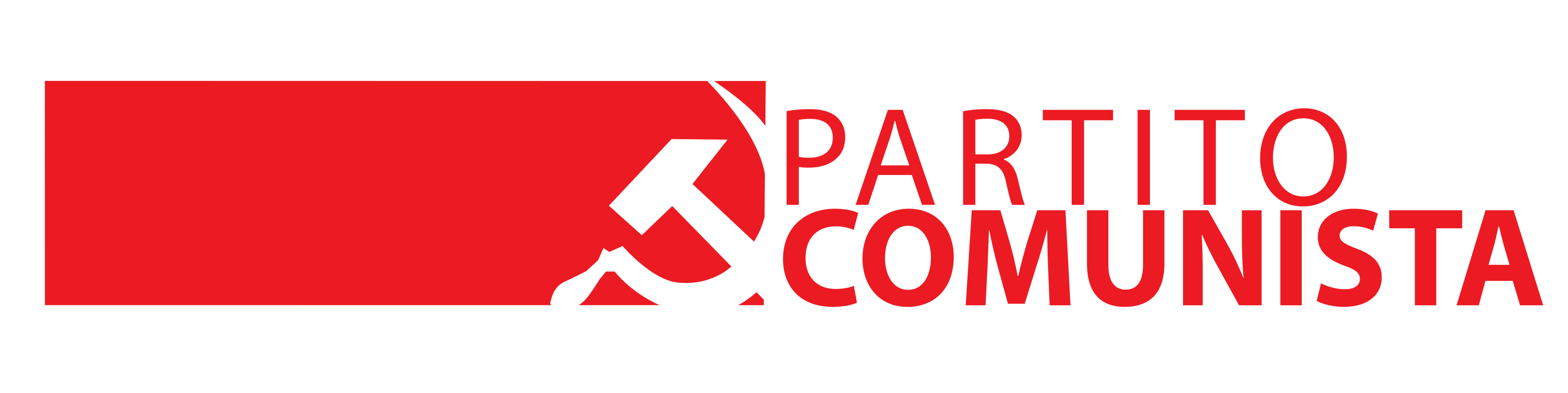
Logo of the Communist Party (Switzerland)

Logo of the Communist Party of the Netherlands

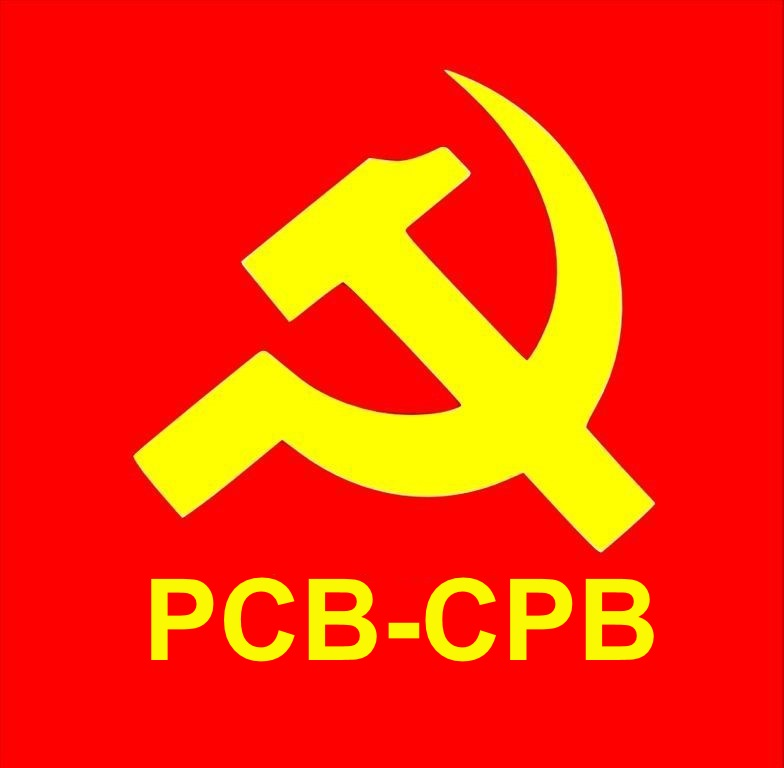
Logo of the Communist Party of Belgium (1989)

Badge of the Marxist–Leninist Communist Party of Turkey

Logo of the Revolutionary Communist Party of Turkey

Logo of Aeroflot

===== Former =====
The hammer and sickle symbol used with the red star used as a symbol of Soviet Union.

Badge of the Communist Party of the Soviet Union

Emblem of the Communist Party of Czechoslovakia

Emblem of the Romanian Communist Party

Logo of the Bulgarian Communist Party

Compass and hammer of East Germany.

Hammer and grain of the Hungarian People's Republic

Emblem of the League of Communists of Yugoslavia

Logo of the Italian Communist Party

Logo of the Proletarian Unity Party (Italy)

Logo of the Communist Party of the Peoples of Spain

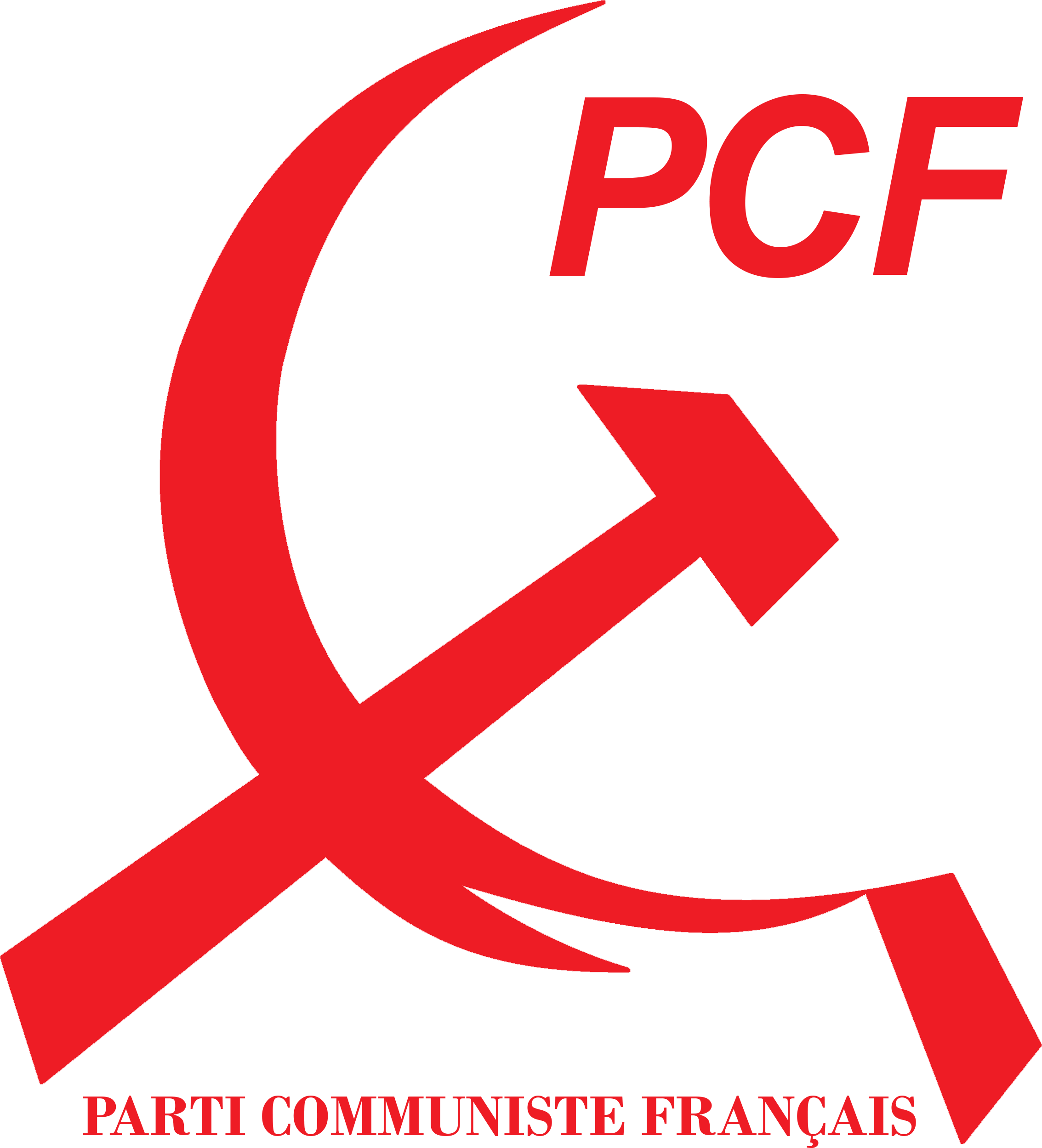
Logo of the French Communist Party (1980‒1996)

Logo of the Communist Party of Germany

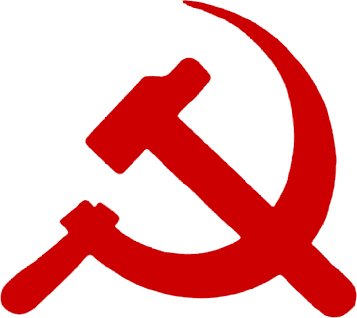
Logo of the Communist Party of Ireland (Marxist–Leninist)

Symbol of the Group of Social Revolutionary Nationalists

==== Asia ====
===== Current =====
Emblem of the Workers' Party of Korea

Logo of the Communist Party of Tajikistan

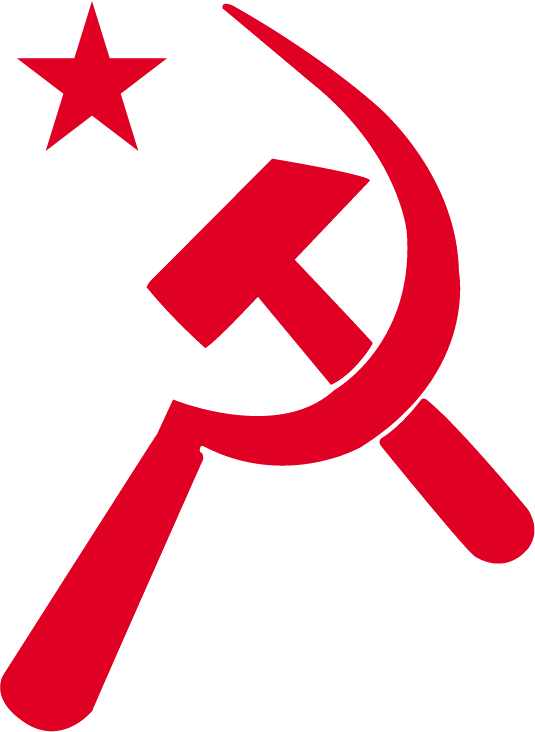
Logo of the Socialist Party of Bangladesh

Emblem of the Communist Party of Vietnam

Alternative emblem of the Communist Party of Vietnam

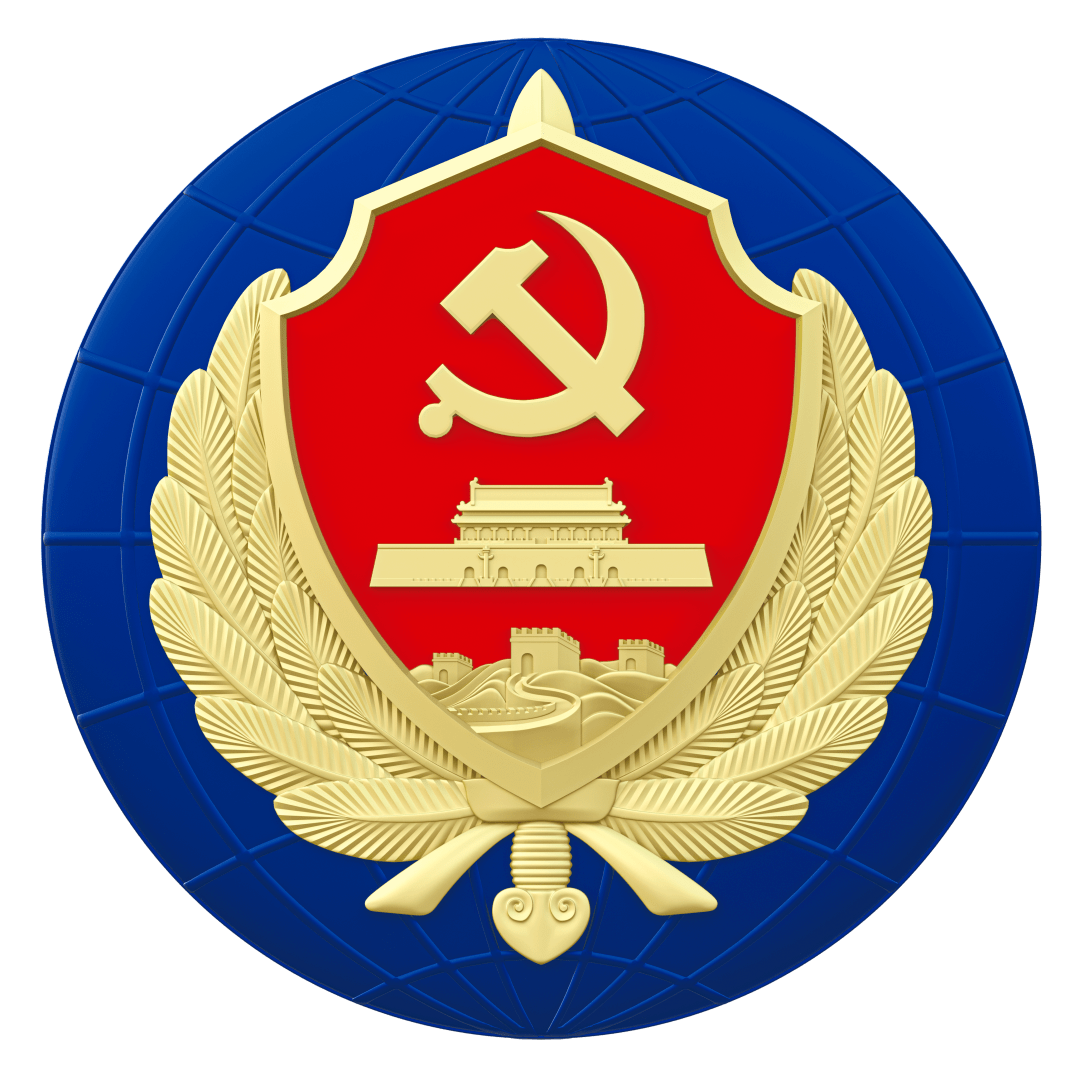
Logo of the Ministry of State Security

Emblem of the Chinese Communist Party (1996–present)

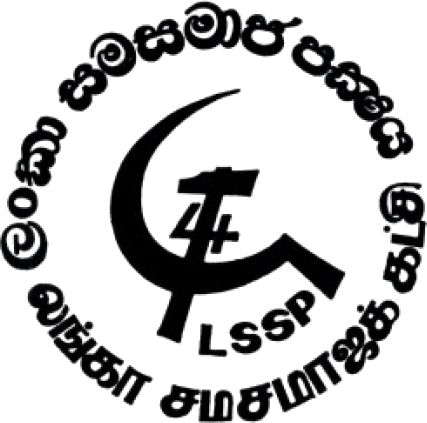
Logo of the Lanka Sama Samaja Party, which features the symbol of the Fourth International

Logo of the Communist Party of India

Logo of the Communist Party of India (Marxist)

===== Former =====
Emblem of the Communist Party of Indonesia (1914‒1966)

Logo of the Acoma Party (Indonesia)

Logo of the Communist Party of Nepal (Unified Marxist–Leninist) (1991–2018)

Emblem of the Chinese Communist Party (1942–1996)

Emblem of the Yemeni Socialist Party (1978-1990)

==== Africa ====
===== Current =====
Logo of the People's Movement for the Liberation of Angola

Logo of the Communist Party of Benin

Logo of the Congolese Party of Labour

Logo of the Egyptian Communist Party

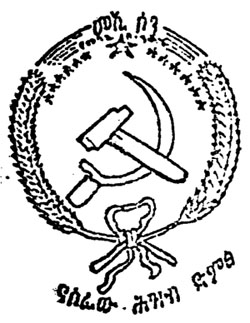
Emblem of the All-Ethiopia Socialist Movement

Hammer and machete logo of the Revolutionary Communist Party of Ivory Coast

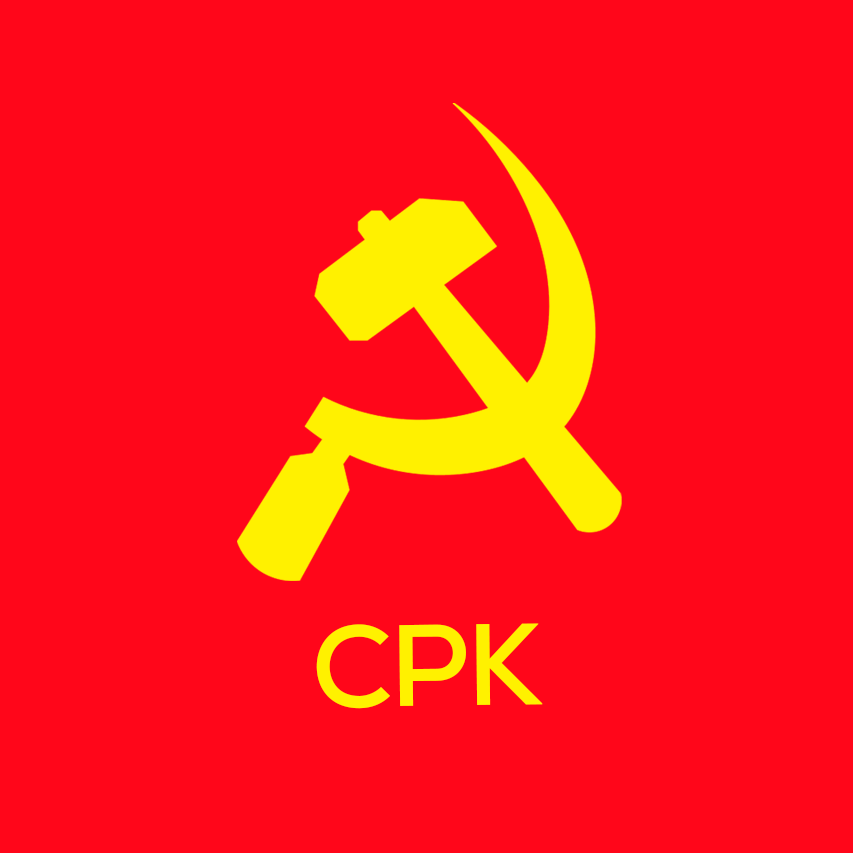
Logo of the Communist Party of Kenya

Logo of the South African Communist Party

Logo of the Workers' Party of Tunisia

===== Former =====
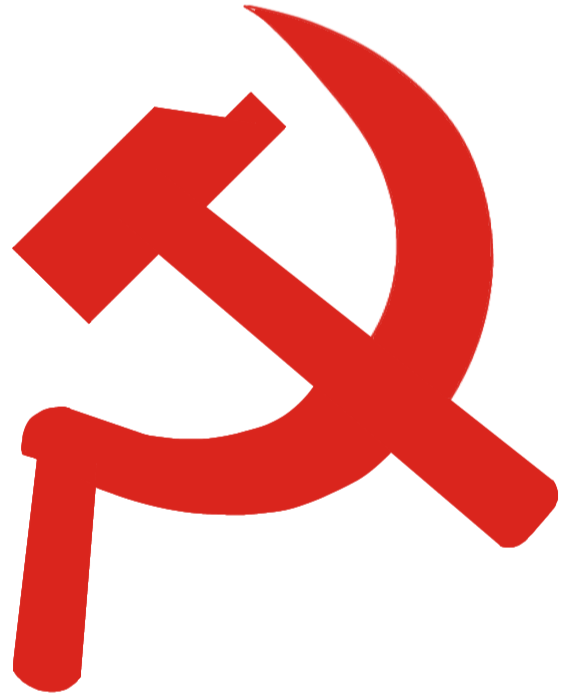
Flag of the Workers' Party of Ethiopia

Emblem of the Ethiopian People's Revolutionary Party (ca. 1975)

Logo of FRELIMO (Mozambique) (1987–2004)

Emblem of the Somali Revolutionary Socialist Party

Logo of the Workers' Party of Tunisia

Logo of the Moroccan Communist Party

==== Americas ====
===== Current =====
Logo of the Communist Party of Argentina

Logo of the Communist Party of Argentina (Extraordinary Congress)

Logo of the Brazilian Communist Party

Logo of the Communist Party of Brazil

Logo of the Workers' Cause Party

Logo of the Communist Party of Chile

Logo of the Communist Party of Ecuador

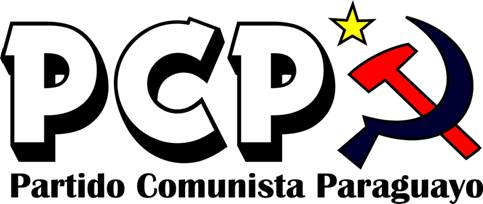
Logo of the Paraguayan Communist Party

Logo of the Shining Path

Logo of the Militarized Communist Party of Peru

Logo of the Communist Party USA

Logo of the American Communist Party

===== Former =====
Logo of the Mexican Communist Party

== Unicode ==
In Unicode, the "hammer and sickle" symbol is U+262D (☭). It is part of the Miscellaneous Symbols (2600–26FF) code block. It was added to Unicode 1.1 in 1993.

== See also ==
- Arm and hammer
- Flag of the Soviet Union
- Fist and rose
- Communist symbolism
- Socialist heraldry
- Hammer and pick (⚒)
- Red flag (⚑)
- Red star (★)
- Transport and Map Symbols Unicode block (contains 🛠 "hammer and wrench" as U+1F6E0)
