= Yevgeny Kamzolkin =

Russian painter (1885–1957)

- Евгений Камзолкин
- Born: Yevgeny Ivanovich Kamzolkin; 19 February 1885; Moscow, Russian Empire
- Died: 18 March 1957 (aged 72); Pushkino, Russian SFSR, Soviet Union
- Education: Moscow School of Painting, Sculpture and Architecture
- Notable work: Hammer and sickle

Yevgeny Ivanovich Kamzolkin (Russian: Евгений Иванович Камзолкин; 19 February 1885 – 18 March 1957) was a Russian and Soviet artist-decorator, photographer, and creator of the hammer and sickle symbol later used in the state emblem of the Soviet Union.

== Biography ==
Born into the family of a Moscow merchant Ivan Vasilyevich Kamzolkin, Kamzolkin was the grandson of a serf and grew up without a father. Between 1904 and 1912 he studied at the Moscow School of Painting, Sculpture and Architecture under the tutorship of Abram Arkhipov and Nikolay Kasatkin. In 1907, he exhibited work at the International Photography Exhibition in Turin.

In 1918, he proposed a 'hammer and sickle' symbol as a decoration for the May Day celebrations in the Zamoskvorechye District of Moscow. Other designs that were rejected included a hammer with an anvil, a plough with a sword and scythe with a wrench.

After the October Revolution he worked on sets for many productions in a Zamoskvorechye theatre, including The Death of Ivan the Terrible by A. K. Tolstoy. During the 1920s, he lived in Pushkino. There he taught arts and crafts to the Pushkin musical and artistic labour colony. Between 1935 and 1936 he participated in the design of the Novosibirsk railway station.

He died in Pushkino.
