= Johnstone Makau =

Kenyan politician

Johnstone Mwendo Makau is founder of the Social Democratic Party of Kenya (now the Communist Party of Kenya). Makau served as Information Minister in the Moi government. Makau was later twice-elected as Mbooni MP in the Kenyan National Assembly affiliated with the KANU party, first when KANU was the single-party government and later after the de jure single-party government reversal.
