= Mwandawiro Mghanga =

Kenyan politician

Member of the National Assembly
- In office 2002–2007
- Preceded by: Darius Msagha Mbela
- Succeeded by: Thomas Ludindi Mwadeghu
- Constituency: Wundanyi

Personal details
- Party: Communist Party of Kenya (since 2019)
- Education: University of Nairobi (expelled); Stockholm University (MA); Swedish University of Agricultural Sciences (MSc)

Mwandawiro Mghanga is a Kenyan politician, who serves as chairperson of the Communist Party of Kenya.

Mghanga was elected to the Kenyan National Assembly, representing the district of Wundanyi from 2002 to 2007.

== Early life and education ==
As a Master's student at the University of Nairobi in 1980, Mghanga chaired the SONU. In this capacity he mobilized students against the de facto single-party Kenyan government. Mghanga was arrested and tortured by the Moi regime for alleged links to the Mwakenya resistance movement.

Following release, Mghanga took political refuge in Sweden where he completed graduate degrees at Stockholm University and the Swedish University of Agricultural Sciences.
