= Student Organization of Nairobi University =

The Student Organization of Nairobi University (abbreviated SONU) was a student movement at the University of Nairobi, Kenya. SONU was founded in 1971. SONU was affiliated with the International Union of Students (IUS).

James Orengo was elected SONU chairman in 1972.

At the time of the murder of Josiah Mwangi Kariuki in 1975, SONU was led by Wanyiri Kihoro and James Orengo. SONU mobilized massive street protests against the killing of Kariuki, which led to riots. In reaction to the student riots President Jomo Kenyatta banned SONU.

SONU was engaged in struggles against introduction of school fees 1980–1983. In February 1982 the government allowed the registration of SONU. But following the failed coup d'état in August 1982, the government cracked down on the student movement. SONU chairman Tito Adungosi was arrested and sentenced to ten years imprisonment for sedition. He died in prison in 1987. Deputy chairman of SONU Mwandawiro Mghanga (who became the SONU chairman in 1985) was also jailed. Repression against SONU under the Daniel arap Moi regime would continue. In 1987 SONU chairman Wafula Buke was accused of being a Libyan spy, and was sentenced to five years imprisonment. In 1987 SONU was again banned by the government.

Leaders of SONU included Paddy Onyango (1982), Rateng’ Ogego (1982), Miguna Miguna (1987) and Kabando wa Kabando (1992). SONU published the newspaper.Under Kabando wa Kabando other leaders included Kamau Mbugua (Secretary General), Michael Oliewo (Vice Chairman), and Moses Kuria (Treasurer)

SONU was revived in 1991, under the label 'SONU'92'. Ahead of the 1992 Kenyan general election, SONU joined the Coalition for National Convention - a coalition of civil society forces led by the National Council of Churches of Kenya calling for a national convention and release of political prisoners. Irungu Kang'ata was elected vice chairman of SONU in 1999.

In the year 2000, student leaders resisted introduction of the parallel degree program and this created conflict between Sonu leadership and the University of Nairobi administration. Subsequently after a night of protests, the university was closed, SONU disbanded and student leaders who included legendary Christopher Owiro(famously known as Karl Marx), the then SONU chairman David Ole Sankok, vice chairman Irungu Kang’ata and over 100 other students were either expelled or suspended.

After the exit from power, a group of students under the leadership of Murage Njagagua, Fwamba NC Fwamba, Makokha Wanjala and Otieno CD started an underground movement to revive the student union and also have students who had been suspended to be readmitted. On 22 January 2003, the then vice chancellor Prof Crispus Kiamba declared an unconditional amnesty to all students who had been expelled or suspended for political reasons. He also lifted the ban on SONU and elections were held on 7 March 2003 where Tedd Munovi was elected chairman, Fwamba NC Fwamba was elected vice chairman for academic affairs, Koome wa Mburugu Vice Chairman in charge of administration, CPA Makokha Wanjala Secretary General and Mwengi Mutuse as organizing secretary.

The introduction of Privately Sponsored Students Programme whereby privately sponsored students joined SONU (a move resisted by government-sponsored students) changed SONU politics for parallel students were later allowed to take part in student leadership. Following the process, the politics of SONU would shift.

David Osiany held the chairmanship of SONU, and was followed by Babu Owino. Edith Mwirigi was the sole female elected Secretary General of SONU at a time when Steve Biko Omondi alias BrandBiko ( Now an engineer turned political author, with four published works to his name: Kasongo: The ‘Wan-Tam’ School Captain, Between Her Thighs, A Nation, Unbroken, and ODM: Between Ballots and Betrayals.) who held the position of Organizing secretary was the most assertive student leader and dominated almost all the union affairs. Babu Owino contested for the second time in 2014 and won against with a landslide. During this time, the most contested position was the Secretary General position between Steve Biko Omondi alias BrandBiko, the then Organization Secretary and Jim Akach, a former campus representative. When Babu Owino contested election for chairman for a fifth time, the university management allegedly worked to introduce legislation to curtail his influence by blocking his re-election.

In 2016 legislation was introduced - Universities (Amendment) Act 2016 - through which SONU, which relied on direct elections for its leadership, was replaced by the University of Nairobi Students Association (which relies on indirect leadership elections through delegates). Per contemporary press commentary, the move to replace SONU by UNSA was done in order to allow the university management to eliminate radical elements from the student movement.
