= Communist Party of Kenya =

Political party in Kenya

Communist Party of Kenya Chama cha Kikomunisti cha Kenya
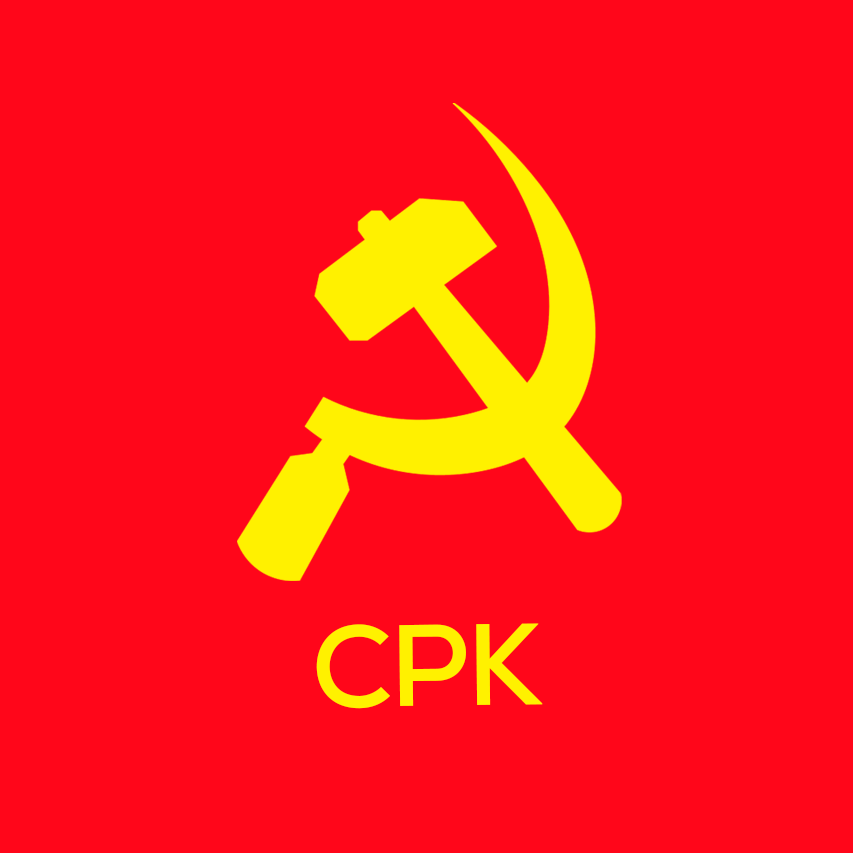
- Abbreviation: CPK
- National Chairperson: Mwandawiro Mghanga
- National Vice Chairperson: Gitahi Ngunyi
- General Secretary: Benedict Wachira
- Founder: Johnstone Makau
- Founded: 1992
- Headquarters: Nairobi
- Ideology: Communism; Historical: Social democracy
- Political position: Far-left
- National affiliation: Kenya Kwanza

Party flag
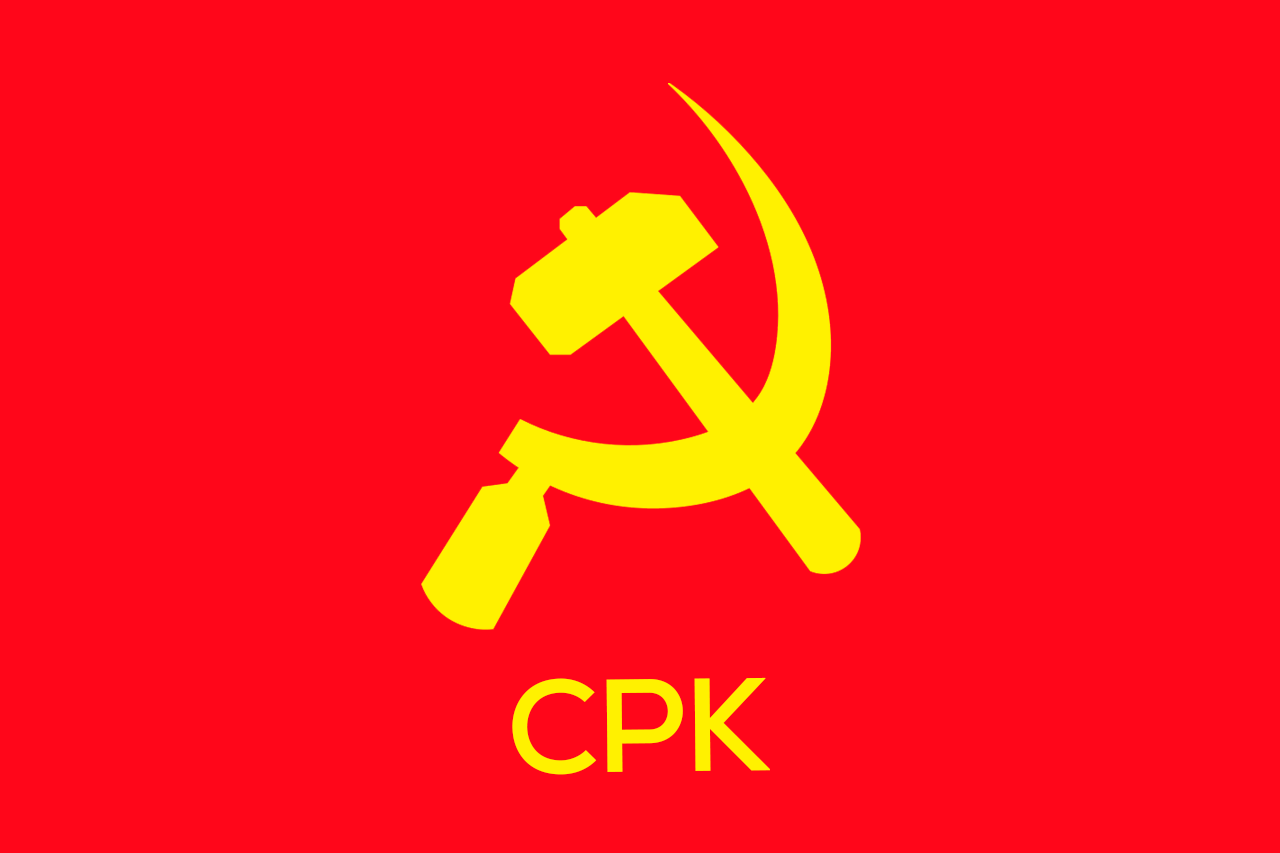

Website
- cpk.ke
- Politics of Kenya; Political parties; Elections; In 2024, the CPK split into a majority faction, which became the Communist Party Marxist – Kenya, and a minority faction, which joined the Kenya Kwanza alliance and retained the original "Communist Party of Kenya" name.

The Communist Party of Kenya (CPK) (Swahili: "Chama cha Kikomunisti cha Kenya"), is a political party in Kenya. Founded in 1992 as the Social Democratic Party (SDP), the party later underwent internal reforms where its name, ideological orientation and political positioning, shifted from that of a social democracy to communism. The party has participated in Kenyan politics through elections, political activism and internal factional disputes.

== History ==
=== Formation and early years ===
The party was founded in 1992 as the Social Democratic Party (SDP) by Johnstone Makau. In its early years, the SDP struggled to gain electoral support in national elections, receiving only 177 votes of 5.4 million in the National Assembly elections of the 1992 general election. The party achieved greater visibility in the 1997 general election, when its presidential candidate, Charity Ngilu, finished in 5th position with 7.9% of the national vote; winning 15 out of 222 seats in the National Assembly.

Ngilu left the party in 2001, and was succeeded by James Orengo, who took over as party chairman. As the party's presidential candidate in the 2002 general election, Orengo received 0.4% of the vote and the party lost all 15 of its seats in the National Assembly. The SDP again performed poorly in the 2007 general election, receiving 0.4%, while fielding 24 candidates. It also failed to win seats in the 2013 general election, receiving 0.15% of the vote with seven candidates.

=== Transition to communism ===
Following its poor performance in the 2002 and 2007 general elections, the party underwent a phase of significant internal changes in 2011.

Members of the Young Socialist Leaders, including future party leaders Booker Ngesa Omole and Benedict Wachira, advocated for a shift towards Marxism–Leninism in 2013. The SDP leadership of the time, Mutahi Kagwe and Njeri Ndwiga, was replaced. Mwandawiro Mghanga assumed the role of National Chairman, with Omole and Wachira assuming the key positions of National Vice Chairperson and Secretary General, respectively.

In 2019, the party officially changed its name to the Communist Party of Kenya, reflecting its adoption of a communist political identity and after obtaining its full registration as a Communist Party. The party has described itself as the first registered socialist political party in Kenya since the 1965 constitutional ban associated with Sessional Paper No. 10

=== Internal crisis of 2022 ===
In April 2022, senior party leaders Benedict Wachira and Mwandawiro Mghanga joined the Kenya Kwanza Alliance, leading to an internal crisis within the party. The Kenya Kwanza faction resolved to expel Booker Omole, the national vice chairman and organising secretary, after he questioned and opposed the decision to join the coalition. Omole appealed the decision to the Political Parties Dispute Tribunal, which blocked the expulsion.

The party's youth league also took the matter to the Political Parties Dispute Tribunal, challenging Mghanga's eligibility to serve as chairman. Mghanga's chairmanship was disputed since he was reportedly a government employee in the County Government of Taita Taveta at the time the party joined the Kenya Kwanza Coalition. The youth league argued that he could not serve as chairman, as the Constitution of Kenya prohibits state officers from holding political office. It asked the tribunal to nullify his position, which would then have nullified his authority to sign the party into the Kenya Kwanza Coalition. The dispute remained unresolved and resulted in the effective splintering of the party.

Following the split, the faction opposed to Kenya Kwanza reconstituted the party's central committee in September 2022 and elected new leaders. Kinuthia Ndung'u was elected national chairman, Booker Ngesa Omole was reinstated as the national vice chairman and organising secretary, and Sefu Sani as the secretary general.

The Kenya Kwanza-aligned members, led by Mghanga and Wachira were described by the opposing faction as a minority faction. After failing to gain control of the party's official instruments, the faction created its own website and established a separate party leadership structure.

=== 2024 party split ===
At the second national congress of the Communist Party of Kenya's majority faction in November 2024, delegates voted to formally differentiate themselves from the minority faction. The majority faction subsequently rebranded itself as the Communist Party Marxist – Kenya following what it described as a rectification programme. The congress adopted a new party emblem, constitution, manifesto and leadership structure, and reaffirmed the party's stated commitment to Marxism-Leninism and its application to Kenya's historical and material conditions. The party also resolved to maintain its independence and reject alliances with what it described as bourgois coalitions dominated by comprador interests

CPM-K describes itself as a people's organisation focused on the interests of the Kenyan masses under the leadership of the proletariat. The Central Organising Committee elected Booker Omole as the general secretary and Mwaivu Kaluka as national chairperson. The party also reconstituted its youth league as the Revolutionary Youth League, established the Revolutionary Women's League as an organ of mass mobilisation and formed a Politburo chaired by Walter Nyaluogo. The Politburo functions as the party's highest decision making body between meetings of the Central Organising Committee.

== Political participation ==
The CPK has participated in Kenyan national elections, while presenting its involvement as a strategic means of engaging with the public, promoting socialist ideas, and criticising the existing capitalist system. The party has also described electoral participation as a way to access resources for organisational development, expose social contradictions, encourage democratic participation, and pursue political power. Its ultimate goal is to establish a socialist government in Kenya with said political power.

=== 1992 and 1997 general elections ===
Following its formation in 1992, the party did not nominate a presidential candidate and received only 177 votes in the National Assembly elections during the 1992 general election.

In the 1997 general election, the party nominated Charity Ngilu as its presidential candidate. Ngilu finished fifth among the presidential candidates with 7.9% of the national vote, and the party won 15 seats in the National Assembly.

=== Subsequent elections ===
The party performed poorly in subsequent general elections, including the 2002 general elections under James Orengo. Its limited electoral success and difficulties with national recognition contributed to internal debates about its party's direction. In 2013, members of the youth wing and other socialist activists within the party pushed for the adoption of a socialist ideology. This process culminated in the party's 2019 name change from the SDP (Social Democratic Party) to the CPK (Communist Party of Kenya).

=== 2022 anti-electoralism decision ===
In 2022, the party's central committee decided not to field a presidential candidate or support any coalition leader in the presidential election. The party cited ideological conflict and declared both leading coalitions anti-people.

== Ideology ==
=== Ideological struggle ===
The party has experienced several internal disputes, ideological debates and leadership changes since the late 1990s. These developments have shaped its organisational structure and political direction.

The CPK identifies with Marxism–Leninism and advocates a classless society, social equality and the abolition of private property. It states that it remains committed to socialist principles while adapting to Kenya's changing political landscape. The party says it seeks to address economic inequality, oppose corruption and empower the working class.

The CPK describes itself as a vanguard movement committed to ideological struggle and to building an organisation based on Marxist-Leninist principles. The party has also acknowledged the role of its youth wing in the transition from social democracy to communism. Its participation in international leftist movements reflects its stated opposition to neocolonialism, imperialism and capitalism.

=== Towards a socialist Kenya ===
The party states that it supports a democratic and sovereign government embodying values such as human dignity, equity, social justice, inclusiveness, and non-discrimination. The CPK advocates for a shift from the present capitalist system to socialism, which it regards as necessary for Kenya's liberation and development.

=== Political activism ===
The CPK has been involved in various social and political movements relating to the rights of workers, peasants, and marginalised communities. It has taken positions on issues such as land reform, anti-imperialism, corruption, and the struggle against neocolonialism.

Despite limited electoral success, internal divisions and periods of government pressure, the CPK has contributed to the discourse and political debate on social justice and socialism in Kenya. The party's ideological evolution, political activity and international links have helped maintain its presence within Kenya's left-wing political landscape.

== Party publications ==
The party publishes, "Itikadi: Socialism, Theory, and Practice," its official magazine, which presents the CPK's ideological perspectives on various social, economic, political, and cultural issues. The magazine promotes socialist and revolutionary ideas and critiques capitalist stances.

During the 23rd International Meeting of Communist and Workers' Parties (IMCWP) in İzmir, Turkey, CPK joined SolidNet,a leftist editorial archive. The party described this as part of its effort to strengthen its international links and to promote its anti-imperialist position.

== Electoral history ==
=== Presidential elections ===
| Election | Party candidate | Votes | % | Result |
|---|---|---|---|---|
| 1992 | did not contest | | | |
| 1997 | Charity Ngilu | 488,600 | 7.89% | Lost ✗ |
| 2002 | James Orengo | 24,524 | 0.4% | Lost ✗ |
| 2007 | did not contest | | | |
| 2013 | did not contest | | | |
| Aug. 2017 | did not contest | | | |
| Oct. 2017 | did not contest | | | |
| 2022 | did not contest | | | |

=== National Assembly elections ===
| Election | Votes | | % | Seats | +/– | Position |
|---|---|---|---|---|---|---|
| 1992 | 177 | | <0.01% | 0 / 188 | | ▲9th |
| 1997 | | | | 15 / 188 | ▲15 | ▲5th |
| 2002 | | | | 0 / 210 | ▼15 | |
| 2007 | 39,871 | | 0.41% | 0 / 210 | Steady | ▲22nd |
| 2013 | Constituency | 18,284 | 0.15 | 0 / 349 | Steady | ▼39th |
| 2013 | County | 7,684 | 0.06 | 0 / 349 | Steady | ▼39th |
| 2017 | did not contest | | | 0 / 348 | Steady | N/A |
| 2022 | did not contest | | | 0 / 349 | Steady | N/A |

=== Senate elections ===
| Election | Votes | % | Seats | +/– | Position |
|---|---|---|---|---|---|
| 2013 | 24,650 | 0.20% | 0 / 67 | | ▲25th |
| 2017 | did not contest | | 0 / 67 | Steady | N/A |
| 2022 | did not contest | | 0 / 67 | Steady | N/A |
