= 2010 in Kenya =

- Decades: 1990s; 2000s; 2010s; 2020s
- See also: Other events of 2010; Timeline of Kenyan history

A list of happenings in 2010 in Kenya:

== Incumbents ==
- President: Mwai Kibaki
- Vice-President: Kalonzo Musyoka
- Chief Justice: Johnson Gicheru

== Events ==
=== January ===
- January 8 - Kenya gazetted the new media law, despite being criticised by the media for limiting the freedom of press.
- January 21 - Jamaican Muslim cleric Sheikh Abdullah al-Faisal was deported from Kenya. Earlier two demonstrators died when a group of youth protesting his arrest clashed with the police
- January 26 - Five people died and seven injured when two lorries collided on Waiyaki Way, Westlands, Nairobi. Another accident occurred in Ndengelwa, Bungoma District, where a matatu and a diesel tanker collided leaving five dead and several injured. In addition, one person at the scene died of police gunshot wounds. The police tried to prevent people from siphoning fuel from the tanker

=== February ===
- February 1 - Five workers died when a quarry collapsed in Mukangu village, Muranga District
- February 2 - The Kenyan Appellate Court orders 2007 parliamentary election votes of the Starehe Constituency to be recounted. The recounting is for irregularities in the original counting, when Margaret Wanjiru won the seat beating narrowly the then incumbent MP Maina Kamanda
- February 5 - The minister of transport Chirau Ali Mwakwere of PNU loses his Matuga Constituency parliamentary seat after the High Court ruled the election not being free, fair and transparent. A by-election is to be held on a later date
- February 13 - Number of permanent secretaries and other government officials are suspended by the president Mwai Kibaki due to corruption allegations on them. Among them is the Education PS Karega Mutahi, who had earlier admitted diverting money single-handedly from a project to another.
- February 14 - Prime Minister Raila Odinga suspends Minister of Agriculture William Ruto and Minister of Education Sam Ongeri alleging them on corruption. Ongeri has admitted diverting school infrastructure money to his constituency while Ruto is linked to the maize scandal. President Mwai Kibaki reversed the suspensions instantly, leading to a political debate on the powers between the president and PM
- February 21 - Six kidnappers were shot dead by the police when they successfully rescued two foreigners, one Ethiopian and one Canadian in Gatundu, Thika District
- February 24 - 11 people died and nearly 30 injured when a bus and a lorry collided at Ndala between Maungu and Voi along the Nairobi - Mombasa Highway
- February 27 - a new political coalition Progressive Democratic Movement (PDM) was announced by Kalonzo Musyoka, Uhuru Kenyatta, George Saitoti and other leaders from PNU-affiliated parties

=== March ===
- March 11 - Administration Police officers shot seven taxi drivers dead in Dagoretti, Nairobi
- March 16 - Six people died when a matatu and a lorry collided along the Sagana-Makutano road.
- March 25 - Nine people died in traffic accident at Kithini village, near Machakos
- March 29 - Two people died when a light aircraft crashed at landing Wilson Airport in Nairobi.
- March 31 - 24 people died in a traffic accident at Katunguma Bridge along Nairobi-Mombasa highway

=== April ===
- April 1 - The Kenyan parliament passes the draft constitution, paving the way for the 2010 constitutional referendum to be held on July 2, 2010.
- April 16 - George Thuo (PNU) loses his parliamentary seat after a court nullified the 2007 election results of Juja Constituency citing irregularities. Margaret Wanjiru (ODM) also risk losing her seat after a Starehe Constituency vote recount indicates that Maina Kamanda (PNU) won the election with a clear margin
- April 23 - 12 people died when a bus collided with a trailer along the Naivasha-Mai Mahiu Road
- April 30 - Dick Wathika (PNU) is set to lose his parliamentary seat after a court nullified the 2007 election results of Makadara Constituency citing irregularities.

=== June ===
- June 10 - Manson Nyamweya of Ford-People won the South Mugirango Constituency parliamentary by-election, beating the previous MP James Omingo Magara, now representing People's Democratic Party (PDP).
- June 13 - A bomb blast at the Uhuru Park in Nairobi kills six people and lefts over 100 people injured. The blast targeted a "NO" campaign rally for the forthcoming constitutional referendum.

=== July ===
- July 12 - Chirau Ali Mwakwere (PNU) retained Matuga Constituency parliamentary seat in a by-election. His election in 2007 had been nullified by high court in February 2010

=== August ===
- August 4 – A referendum is held on the Proposed Constitution of Kenya, which was then ratified by a 68.55% majority, paving way for promulgation on 27 August 2010

=== September ===
- September 20 - Three parliamentary by-elections were held. Margaret Wanjiru retained her Starehe Constituency seat beating Maina Kamanda (PNU). William Kabogo Gitau (NARC-Kenya) won the Juja Constituency seat, Alice Wambui of Kenya National Congress was distant second, while the previous MP, George Thuo of PNU was left third. The Makadara Constituency seat was taken up by Gideon Mbuvi Kioko of NARC-Kenya followed by Reuben Ndolo of ODM while the previous MP Dick Wathika (PNU) was left third.

=== October ===
- October 19 - Higher education minister William Ruto was suspended due to ongoing investigations on his alleged involvement in a forest land corruption case
- October 22 - The Kirinyaga Central Constituency MP John Ngata Kariuki loses his seat following a declaration by High court that he was wrongfully declared the winner at the 2007 parliamentary elections
- October 26 - Nairobi Mayor Geoffrey Majiwa steps aside after being charged for his alleged involvement in a cemetery land corruption scandal
- October 27 - Foreign Minister Moses Wetangula resigned due to allegations of him being involved in an Embassy corruption scandal. His Permanent Secretary Thuita Mwangi resigned also. George Saitoti was subsequently named the foreign minister on an acting capacity

=== November ===
- November 2 - The Truth Justice and Reconciliation Commission chairman Bethuel Kiplagat steps aside to allow a tribunal to investigate his conduct
- November 6 - Peter Karanja, a jealous Administration Police officer, killed 10 people in a shooting spree in Siakago

== Deaths ==
=== January - March ===
- January 10 - Wilfred Mang’era Apencha, politician, shot dead
- February 6 - Kipkemboi Kimeli, runner and Olympic bronze medallist, pneumonia and tuberculosis
- February 17 - David Lelei, runner, car accident
- March 7 - Newton Kulundu, 62, politician, former minister, illness

=== April - June ===
- April 27 - William Odongo Omamo, 82, former minister, illness
- May 20, Kennedy Kiliku, 57, politician
- June 29, Queen Jane, 45, musician, illness

=== October - December ===
- December 28 - Gerishon Kirima, 80, politician and businessman

== Sports ==
=== January - March ===
- February 1 - February - Kenyan Serie A player McDonald Mariga moves from Parma to Inter
- February 11 - Kenya fails to qualify for the 2010 Twenty20 World Cup in a qualifier tournament held in Abu Dhabi
- March 28 - Kenya wins all individual and team titles at the 2010 IAAF World Cross Country Championships in Bydgoszcz, Poland. The individual gold medalists were Joseph Ebuya (men), Emily Chebet (women), Caleb Ndiku (junior men) and Mercy Cherono (junior women)

=== May - July ===
- 28 July - August 1 - Kenya hosts the 2010 African Championships in Athletics at Nyayo Stadium, Nairobi, emerging with her largest medal total (10 gold, 7 silver, 8 bronze, 25 medals in total) at the African Senior Athletics Championships

=== August - October ===
- 14–26 August - Kenya participates in the inaugural Youth Olympic Games in Singapore, winning 3 gold and 3 bronze in various athletics disciplines
