= 10th Parliament of Kenya =

The 10th Parliament of Kenya saw the National Assembly opened on 15 January 2008. This following the Orange Democratic Movement (ODM) of Raila Odinga winning a majority in the 2007 parliamentary elections. Raila was a candidate in the presidential elections, which resulted in a controversial victory for Mwai Kibaki of the Party of National Unity. The opening of the parliament was fraught with jeers, cheers and brawls between the opposing parties; Mwai Kibaki was greeted by the ODM members with silence and boos, while Raila was greeted by PNU members with accusations of genocide.

The inauguration of the 10th Parliament's first session commenced on 6 March 2008, when Odinga was sworn in as provisional Prime Minister and the National Accord and Reconciliation Act 2008 was passed. ODM member Kenneth Marende was elected speaker, defeating PNU member Francis ole Kaparo 105–101 in the third round of balloting.

== Timeline and bills passed ==
- 21 April 2009 - Parliament re-opens. An impasse between the President and the Prime Minister occurred when both presented the Speaker with letters appointing their respective preferred nominees for the position of Leader of Government Business (The Chair of the House Business Committee). The Speaker finally ruled and temporarily appointed himself as the Chair while the impasse is resolved with Odinga withdrawing from the House Business Committee in odds for Kibaki's appointee, Kalonzo Musyoka, to be confirmed leader of Government business.
- 30 April 2009 - Parliament approved the list of the IIEC (Interim Independent Electoral Commission of Kenya) that was recommended as a stop gap electoral commission, by the Kriegler Commission.
- 7 May 2009 - Parliament approved the list of the IIBRC (Interim Independent Boundaries Review Commission of Kenya) that will re-district constituency and district boundaries to be more representative of the population based on current voter registration statistics or the 2009 Census data that was due to be completed in October 2009. However, the controversy that broke out about their recommendations, means that issues about fairness are still to be resolved. On the same day, President Kibaki assented the bill that created the IIEC and formally appointed the IIEC commissioners.
- 12 May 2009 - President Kibaki assented the bill that created the IIBRC and officially appointed the list of commissioners approved by parliament.
- 7 April 2010 - House passes draft of the proposed constitution of Kenya, prepared by Committee of Experts without any amendments, paving way for a constitutional referendum in which was held in August 2010
- 27 August 2011 - The House passes a record 16 bills in one week, all concerning implementation of the new constitution to keep up with deadlines set out in the fifth schedule of the new constitution. Among them were key bills setting up an Independent Elections and Boundary Review Commission and a revamped Anti-Corruption Commission investigation body.

== By-elections ==
=== Changes in the makeup of the 10th Parliament ===
	Party							Total	Vacant
	ODM	NARC ODM-affiliated	PNU	PNU-affiliated	KANU PNU-affiliated	ODM-Kenya	Unaffiliated	Total	Vacant
Begin	99	3	43	21	14	16	11	207	3
15 January 2008	98	3	43	21	14	16	11	206	4
29 January 2008	97	3	43	21	14	16	11	205	5
31 January 2008	96	3	43	21	14	16	11	204	6
11 March 2008	102	3	46	21	15	18	11	216	6
10 June 2008	100	3	46	21	15	18	11	214	8
17 June 2008	103	3	48	21	15	18	11	219	3
7 October 2008	105	3	49	21	15	18	11	222	0
18 March 2009	105	3	49	20	15	18	11	221	1
4 May 2009	104	3	49	20	15	18	11	220	2
1 September 2009	106	3	49	20	15	18	11	222	0
15 January 2010	105	3	49	20	15	18	11	221	1
25 February 2010	105	3	48	20	15	18	11	220	2
29 April 2010	105	3	47	20	15	18	11	219	3
14 May 2010	105	3	46	20	15	18	11	218	4
16 June 2010	105	3	46	21	15	18	11	219	3
20 July 2010	105	3	47	21	15	18	11	220	2
13 August 2010	104	3	47	21	14	18	11	218	4
28 September 2010	105	3	47	23	14	18	11	221	1
19 October 2010	105	3	47	23	14	19	11	222	0
24 November 2010	105	3	47	22	14	19	11	221	1
22 February 2011	105	3	48	22	14	19	11	222	0
24 February 2011	105	3	47	22	14	19	11	221	1
14 March 2011	105	3	47	21	14	19	11	220	2
31 May 2011	105	3	47	22	14	19	11	221	1
23 August 2011	105	3	48	22	14	19	11	222	0
1 September 2011	105	3	48	22	14	19	10	221	1
6 December 2011	105	3	49	22	14	19	10	222	0
20 July 2012	104	3	47	22	14	19	10	219	3
20 September 2012	105	3	47	24	14	19	10	222	0
Last voting share	48.6%		46.8%				4.5%		
PNU-affiliated: Sisi Kwa Sisi, Safina, NARC-Kenya, FORD-Kenya, Ford-People, New Ford-K, Mazingira Party, Ford-Asili, DP, TNA; Unaffiliated: PDP, PPK, NLP, KADDU, UDM, PICK, CCU, Kenda Nation 09-01-2008

=== June 2008 ===
Following the election, two ODM MPs—Mugabe Were and David Kimutai Too—were killed during the post-election crisis, which was the result of a dispute over the results of the presidential election. As a result, by-elections were needed in their constituencies. In addition, by-elections had to be held in two constituencies in the Rift Valley where results were never announced due to violence. Kenneth Marende was elected as Speaker of Parliament following the election, leaving his seat vacant and requiring another by-election to be held in his constituency. The ODM was left with 96 seats at this point.

These five by-elections were held on 11 June 2008. On 10 June, two ministers—Minister of Roads Kipkalya Kones and Assistant Minister of Home Affairs Lorna Laboso, both from ODM—were killed in a plane crash, leaving another two seats vacant (and reducing ODM to 94 MPs). They had been going to the Rift Valley for the by-elections at the time of the accident.

Three of the five by-elections were won by the ODM and two by the PNU. The ODM kept its seats in Emuhaya and Ainamoi constituencies; however, it lost the seat in Nairobi's Embakasi Constituency to the PNU. Counting allied parties and MPs, ODM now has 103 MPs and PNU 104 MPs.

=== September 2008 ===
By-elections were held in Bomet and Sotik constituencies on 25 September and were won by Beatrice Kones and Joyce Laboso respectively. Both seats were retained by ODM and were won by close relatives of their immediate predecessors, who died in an aviation accident in June: Beatrice Kones is the widow of Kipkalya Kones and Joyce Laboso is the sister of Lorna Laboso.

=== August 2009 ===
In May 2009, Parliament approved the formation of a new Electoral body, The Interim Independent Electoral Commission (IIEC), paving the way for by-elections in the constituencies of Shinyalu and Bomachoge, which were held on 27 August 2009. Shinyalu fell vacant when its sitting MP Charles Lugano of ODM died. ODM retained the seat, after Justus Kizito won it at the by-elections. The Bomachoge seat was vacated after the 2007 Elections at the constituency were nullified due to irregularities. The seat was won in 2007 by Joel Onyancha of Ford-People. At the 2007 by-elections Simon Ogari of ODM narrowly beat Onyancha, who was now representing PNU. For the first time in Kenya, the ballot boxes were transparent.

=== June 2010 ===
In December 2009 the High court of Kenya declared the South Mugirango parliamentary seat vacant due to irregularities in the election process, although James Omingo Magara of ODM, who had won the election, was not found guilty of any rigging. Subsequent South Mugirango by-election was held on 10 June 2010. Magara decamped to the little-known People's Democratic Party (PDP) after being not favoured by the ODM leader Raila Odinga. The by-election was won by Manson Nyamweya of Ford-People, who beat Magara and Ibrahim Ochoi of ODM.

=== July 2010 ===
As of 5 February 2010, the Matuga Constituency MP Chirau Ali Mwakwere (PNU) lost his cabinet and parliamentary seat. This was due to a petition filed by a voter, Mr Ayub Juma Mwakesi, who wanted the election of Mr Mwakwere nullified citing that the entire election process was marred by irregularities. The ruling that nullified Mr Mwakwere's election in the 2007 election was made by High Court Judge, Justice Mohamed Ibrahim. A subsequent by-election was held on 12 July 2010. Mwakwere retained the seat by beating his closest rival, Hassan Mwanyoha of ODM

=== September 2010 ===
Three parliamentary by-elections were held on 20 September 2011. Margaret Wanjiru (ODM) retained her Starehe Constituency seat beating Maina Kamanda (PNU). The by-election was held after vote recount held in April 2010 indicated that the poll was actually won by Maina Kamanda.

William Kabogo Gitau (NARC-Kenya) won the Juja Constituency seat. Alice Wambui of Kenya National Congress was distant second, while the previous MP, George Thuo of PNU was left third. Theo had lost the seat due to irregularities at the 2007 election.

The Makadara Constituency seat was taken up by Gideon Mbuvi Kioko of NARC-Kenya followed by former MP Reuben Ndolo of ODM while Dick Wathika (PNU) was left third. Wathika was the previous MP, but had lost the seat due to irregularities at the 2007 election.

=== February 2011 ===
John Ngata Kariuki of Ford-Asili lost his Kirinyaga Central Constituency seat after a court petition filed by the previous Kirinyaga Central MP Daniel Karaba (Narc-Kenya) on 22 October 2010. Kariuki decided not to defend his seat at the subsequent by-election. The by-election was held on 16 February 2011. The PNU candidate Joseph Gitari won the poll leaving Karaba to second place.

== See also ==
- Constitutional Reforms in Kenya
