= Commission on Administrative Justice =

Kenyan government commission

The Commission on Administrative Justice of Kenya also known as The Office of the Ombudsman is a government Commission established under the Commission on Administrative Justice Act 2011 pursuant to Article 59 (4) of the Constitution of Kenya.

== Role ==
The Key functions of the Commission are:

- Quasi-judicial mandate to deal with maladministration.
- Ensuring compliance with leadership, integrity and ethics requirements.
- Litigation and quasi- judicial functions.
- Reporting Obligation.
- Training of Government Ministries Departments and agencies.
- Resolution of inter-governmental conflicts.
- Provision of advisory opinions and recommendations
- Promotion of Constitutionalism and Human Rights advocacy and;
- Performance contracting

== Membership ==
The current membership of the Commission on Administrative Justice is as follows:

- Hon. Charles Orinda Dulo (Chairperson)
- (Vice Chairperson)
- Madam. Dorothy Jemator Kimengetich ( Vice Chairperson & Commissioner Access to Information)
- Hon. Charles Kanyi Njagua ( Commissioner in Charge of Complaints & Investigations)
- Madam. Mercy Kalondu Wambua, OGW (Commission Secretary/CEO)

Previous Members

- Otiende Amollo (Chairman)
- Regina Mwatha
- Saadia Mohamed
- Leonard Ngaluma

== Notable events ==
On 17 December 2012 the Commission wrote a letter to the Independent Electoral and Boundaries Commission (IEBC) stating that 36 Kenyans including 2 Members of Parliament, Gideon Mbuvi and Ferdinand Waititu were unfit to hold office and therefore ineligible participate in the upcoming General election. Also on the list were 22 commissioners of the now defunct Electoral Commission of Kenya who were accused of mismanaging the 2007 General Election.
