= History of Nairobi =

- 1899–present
Colonial East Africa	Independent Kenya
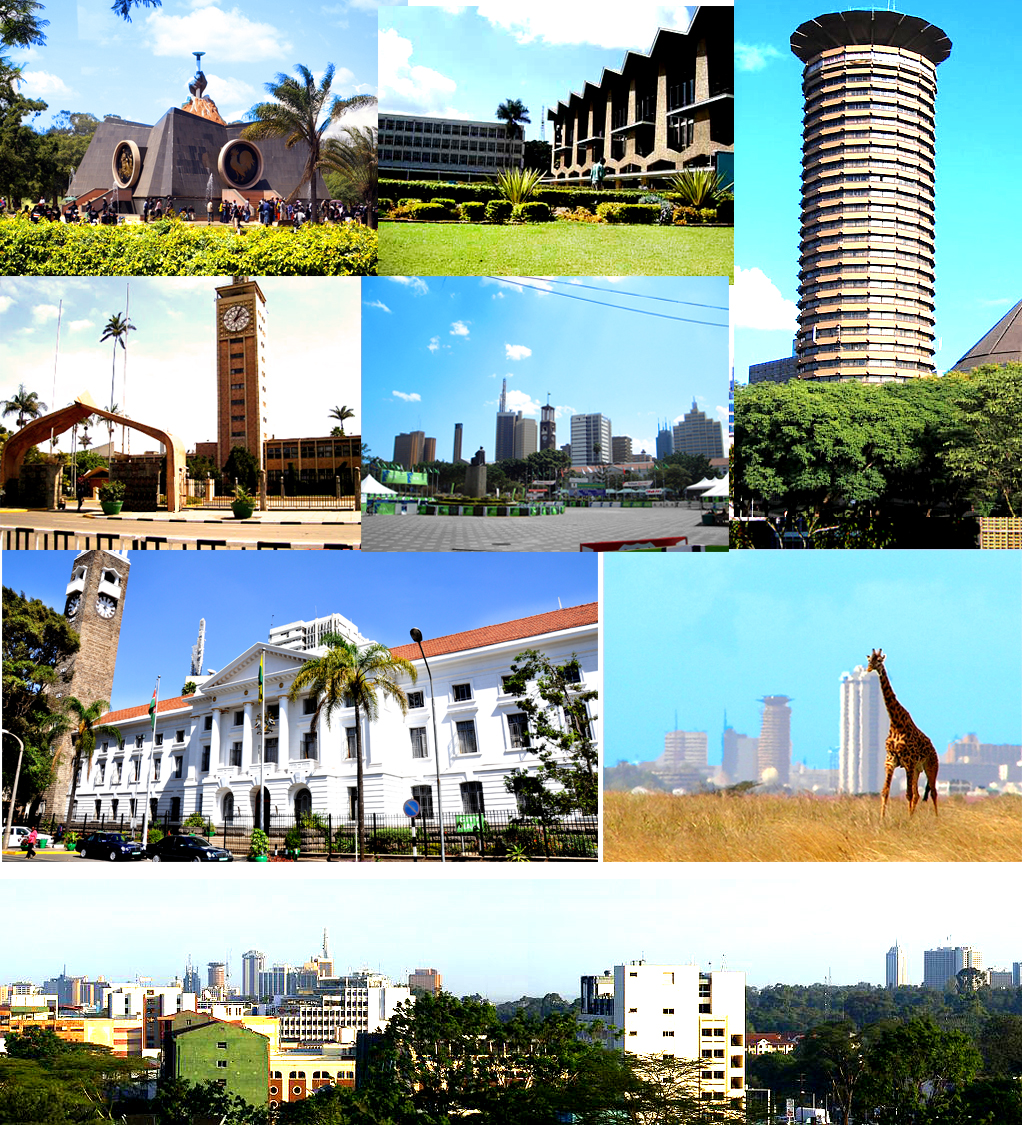
- Various scenes of Nairobi city
- Location: Nairobi, Kenya
- Including: Maasai, Kikuyu, Akamba communities
- Monarch: British Crown (1899–1963)
- Leader(s): Jomo Kenyatta, Daniel arap Moi, Uhuru Kenyatta, among others
- President: Jomo Kenyatta (first President)
- Prime Minister: Jomo Kenyatta (first Prime Minister)
- Key events: 1899: Establishment of railway depot; 1905: Nairobi declared capital; 1946: Nairobi National Park established; 1998: U.S. Embassy bombing; 2007: Post-election violence; 2013: Westgate shopping mall attack

The earliest account of Nairobi's /naɪˈroʊbɪ/ history dates back to 1899 when a railway depot was built in a brackish African swamp occupied by a pastoralist people, the Maasai, the sedentary Akamba people, as well as the agriculturalist Kikuyu people who were all displaced by the colonialists. The railway complex and the buildings around it rapidly expanded and urbanized until it became the largest city of Kenya and the country's capital. The name Nairobi comes from the Maasai phrase Enkare Nyirobi, which translates to 'the place of cool waters'. However, Nairobi is popularly known as the "Green City in the Sun".

== Pre-independence ==
The site of Nairobi was originally a swamp land occupied by a pastoralist people, the Maasai, the long-distance trader community, Akamba People, as well as the agriculturalist Kikuyu people. The name Nairobi comes from the Maasai expression meaning 'cool waters'. referring to the cold water stream which flowed through the area. With the arrival of the Uganda Railway, the site was identified by Sir George Whitehouse for a store depot, shunting ground and camping ground for the Indian labourers working on the railway.

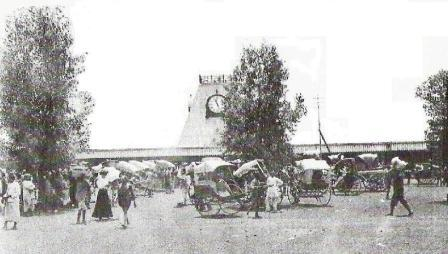
The entrance to Nairobi railway station in 1899

In the pre-colonial era, the people of modern Kenya mostly lived in villages amongst their tribes and cultural groups, where they had rulers within their communities rather than one singular government or leader.

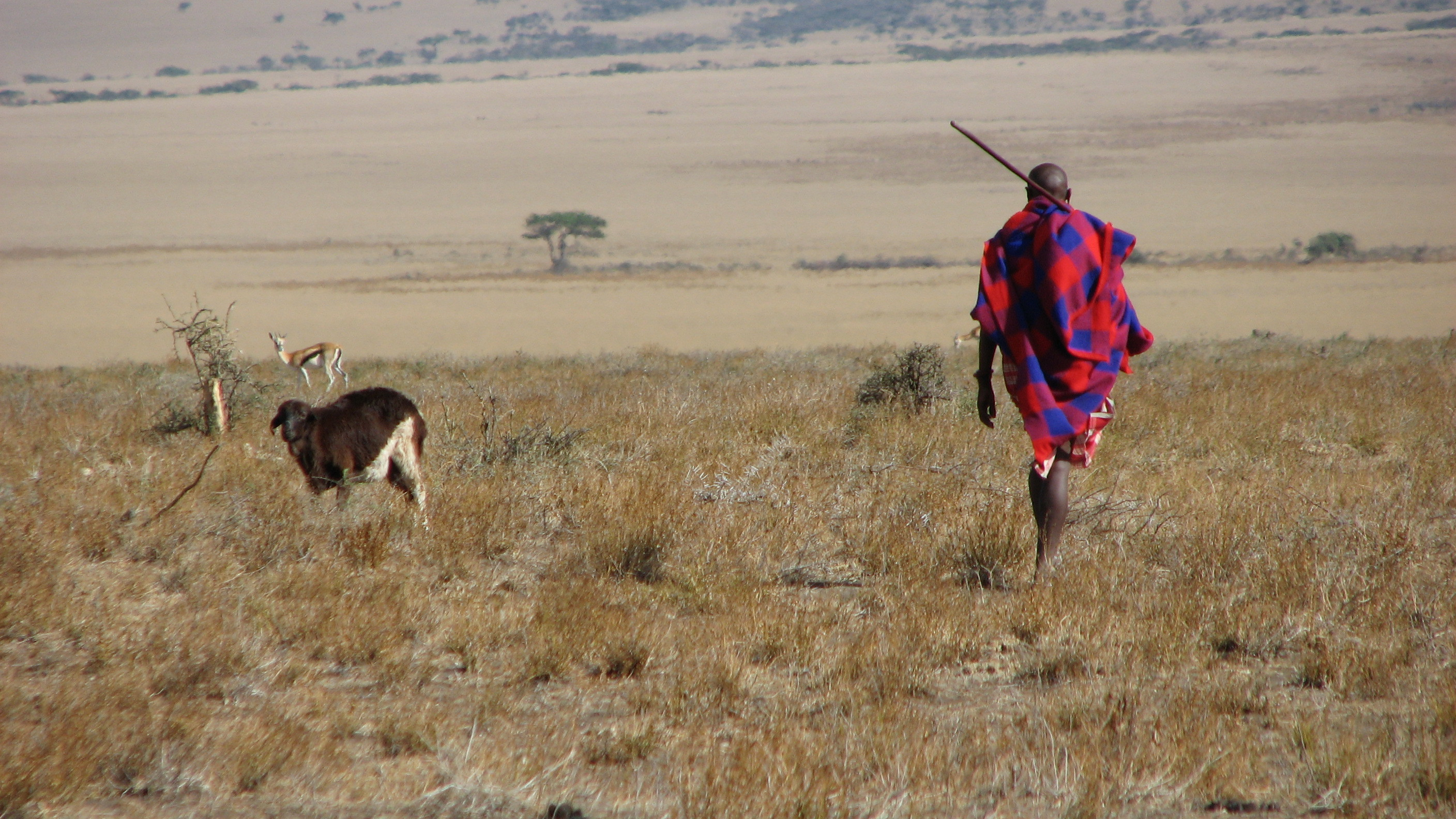
A Maasai man

The former swamp land occupied by the city now was once inhabited by a pastoralist people, the Maasai, the sedentary Akamba people, as well as the agriculturalist Kikuyu people, under the British East Africa protectorate when the British decided to build a railroad from Mombasa to Kisumu on the edge of Lake Victoria in order to open East Africa and make it accessible for trade and encourage colonial settlements. The Maasai were forcibly removed to allow white ranchers to use the land. The city continued to grow under British rule, and many British people settled within the city's suburbs. This continuous expansion of the city began to anger the Maasai people, as the city was devouring their land to the south. The Kikuyus were also angered and wanted the land returned to them.

== Colonial settlement ==
=== Uganda Railway ===
Whitehouse, chief engineer of the railway, favoured the site as an ideal resting place due to its high elevation, temperate climate, adequate water supply and being situated before the steep ascent of the Limuru escarpments. His choice was criticised by officials within the Protectorate government who felt the site was too flat, poorly drained and relatively infertile.

In 1894, work on the railway began. A British railroad camp and supply depot for the Uganda Railway was built in the Maasai area in 1899. The building soon became the railway's headquarters and a town grew up surrounding it, named after a watering hole known in Maasai as Ewaso Nyirobi, meaning 'cool waters'. The location of the Nairobi railway camp was chosen due to its central position between Mombasa and Kampala, as well as its proximity to a network of rivers that could supply the camp with water. Its elevation made it cool enough for comfortable residential living. Furthermore, at 1661 meters above the sea level, the temperatures are too low for the mosquitoes carrying malaria to survive.

=== Platting and rebuilding (1898–1900) ===
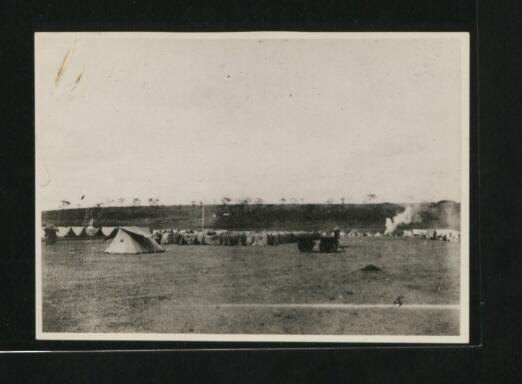
Nairobi in 1899

In 1898, he was commissioned to design the first town layout for the railway depot. It constituted two streets – Victoria Street and Station Street, ten avenues, staff quarters and an Indian commercial area. The railway arrived at Nairobi on 30 May 1899, and soon Nairobi replaced Machakos as the headquarters of the provincial administration for the Ukamba province.

On the arrival of the railway, Whitehouse remarked that "Nairobi itself will in the course of the next two years become a large and flourishing place and already there are many applications for sites for hotels, shops and houses." The town's early years were however beset with problems of malaria leading to at least one attempt to have the town moved.

The town was totally rebuilt in the early 1900s after an outbreak of plague and the subsequent burning down of the original town. In the early 1900s, Bazaar Street, now Biashara Street, was completely rebuilt after an outbreak of plague and the burning of the original town.

=== Growth (1900–1963) ===
Between 1902 and 1910, the town's population rose from 5,000 to 16,000 and grew around administration and tourism, initially in the form of big game hunting. In 1907, Nairobi replaced Mombasa as the capital of the East Africa Protectorate. In 1919, Nairobi was declared to be a municipality. By 1905, Nairobi was a humming commercial center and replaced Mombasa as capital of the British East Africa. The city expanded, supported by the growth in administrative functions and in tourism, initially in the form of British big game hunting. As the British colonialists explored the region, they began using Nairobi as their first stop. This prompted the colonial government to build several grand hotels in the city for British tourists and big game hunters.

Nairobi continued to grow under British rule, and many Britons settled within the city's suburbs. The continuous expansion of the city began to anger the Maasai, as the city was devouring their land to the south, as well as the Kikuyu people, who felt that the land belonged to them. In 1919, Nairobi was declared to be a municipality by the British.

In 1921, Nairobi had 24,000 residents, of which circa 12,000 were native Africans. The next decade saw growth in native African communities in Nairobi, and they began to constitute a majority for the first time. This growth caused planning issues, described by Thorntorn White and his planning team as the "Nairobi Problem". In February 1926, colonial officer Eric Dutton passed through Nairobi on his way to Mount Kenya, and said of the city:

Maybe one day Nairobi will be laid out with tarred roads, with avenues of flowering trees, flanked by noble buildings; with open spaces and stately squares; a cathedral worthy of faith and country; museums and art; theatres and public offices. And it is fair to say that the Government and the Municipality have already bravely tackled the problem and that a town-plan ambitious enough to turn Nairobi into a thing of beauty has been slowly worked out, and much has already been done. But until that plan has borne fruit, Nairobi must remain what she was then, a slatternly creature, unfit to queen it over so lovely a country.

==== Unrest ====
In 1915,the British passed laws restricting the ownership of land to whites. Then followed high taxes and low wages. Blacks were forced to carry identification cards. In 1921, Harry Thuku founded the Young Kikuyu Association and began organizing protests as people became more open about their grievances against the British. On 14 March 1922,he was arrested. His arrest caused a general strike in Nairobi in which thousands of Africans protested and the British government reacted by shooting 56 protesters, 25 of whom died, the massacre shocking people worldwide, even the British. Although Thuku was exiled to a remote desert oasis, this was only the beginning of unrest that continued with escalating severity.

The Thuku riots reinforced a segregationist method of town planning, as a means to control the African population in Nairobi.

After the end of World War II, the friction developed into the Mau Mau Uprising. Jomo Kenyatta, Kenya's future president, joined the Kikuyu Central Association after moving to the urban Nairobi from a small village, becoming its general secretary in three years, a step that lead to his becoming Kenya's first prime minister and then Kenya's first president. Pressure exerted from the local people on the British resulted in Kenyan independence in 1963, with Nairobi as the capital of the new republic.

Because the area around Nairobi continued to be a popular attraction for British big game hunters, to protect the animals the Nairobi National Park was established by Britain in 1946, the first national park in East Africa. It remains unique in 2008 in that it is the only game reserve bordering on a capital city in the world.

After World War II, continuous expansion of the city angered both the indigenous Maasai and Kikuyu. This led to the Mau Mau Uprising in the 1950s, and the Lancaster House Conferences, which initiated a transition to Kenyan independence in 1963.

In the spring of 1950, the East African Trades Union Congress (EAUTC) led a nine-day general strike in the city.

== Post independence ==
=== 20th century ===
Nairobi remained Kenya's capital after independence, and its continued rapid growth put pressure on the city's infrastructure, with power cuts and water shortages becoming a common occurrence.

In September 1973, the Kenyatta International Conference Centre (KICC) was opened to the public. The 28-story building at the time was designed by the Norwegian architect Karl Henrik Nøstvik and Kenyan David Mutiso. It is the only building within the city with a helipad that is open to the public. Of the buildings built in the Seventies, the KICC was the most eco-friendly and most environmentally conscious structure. Its main frame was constructed with locally available materials like gravel, sand, cement and wood, and it had wide open spaces which allowed for natural aeration and lighting. Cuboids made up the plenary hall, the tower consisted of a cylinder composed of several cuboids, and the amphitheatre and helipad both resembled cones. The tower was built around a concrete core, and it had no walls but glass windows, which allowed for maximum natural lighting. It had the largest halls in eastern and central Africa.

In 1972, the World Bank approved funds for further expansion of the then Nairobi Airport (now Jomo Kenyatta International Airport), including a new international and domestic passenger terminal building, the airport's first dedicated cargo and freight terminal, new taxiways, associated aprons, internal roads, car parks, police and fire stations, a State Pavilion, airfield and roadway lighting, a fire hydrant system, water, electrical, telecommunications and sewage systems, a dual carriageway passenger access road, security, drainage and the building of the main access road to the airport (Airport South Road). The cost of the project was more than US$29 million, US$111.8 million in 2013 dollars. On 14 March 1978, construction of the terminal building was completed on the other side of the airport's single runway and opened by President Jomo Kenyatta less than five months before his death. The airport was renamed Jomo Kenyatta International Airport in memory of its first president.

The Giraffe Centre, an animal sanctuary on the southwestern outskirts of Nairobi, was opened in 1983. It breeds the endangered Rothschild's giraffe.

The United States Embassy, then located in downtown Nairobi, was bombed in August 1998 by Al-Qaeda and the Egyptian Islamic Jihad, as one of a series of US embassy bombings. It is now the site of a memorial park.

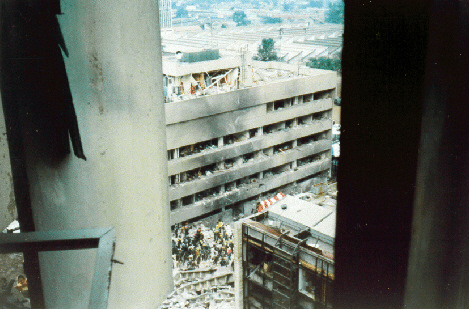
1998 embassy bombing

After independence, Nairobi grew rapidly and this growth put pressure on the city's infrastructure. Power cuts and water shortages were a common occurrence, though in the past few years better city planning has helped to put some of these problems in check.

In 1975 Nairobi was the host city of the 5th Assembly of the World Council of Churches.

The U.S. embassy in the heart of Nairobi was bombed on 7 August 1998 by Al-Qaida, as one of a series of U.S. embassy bombings. Over two hundred civilians were killed in the embassy and another 213 persons in the surrounding area with more than 5,000 people injured. The effects were widespread and devastating. The embassy was completely destroyed and another forty buildings severely damaged. A seven-story building collapsed killing at least 60 people.

=== 21st century ===
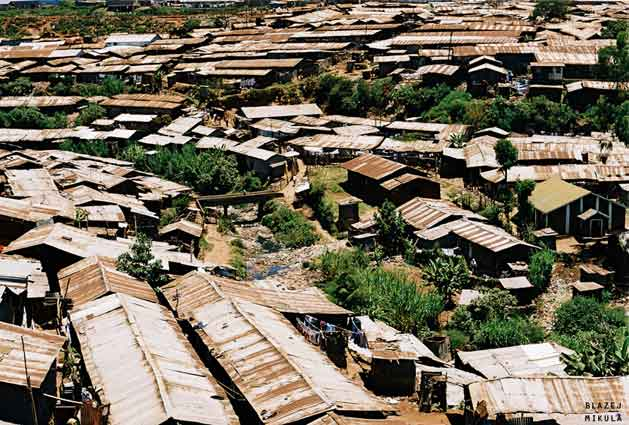
Slums in Nairobi

The growth of Nairobi has put pressure on the government to develop and maintain protected lands such as the Nairobi National Park. The new residential areas for the growing human population are making inroads into lands that have been traditionally the migration routes for huge animal herds.

Following the disputed Kenyan presidential election, 2007, serious violence broke out in Nairobi. In the Mathare slum, Kikuyu and Luo gangs burned more than 100 homes.

On 21 September 2013, a mass shooting broke out in the luxurious Westgate shopping mall in Nairobi's Westlands neighbourhood, killing at least 68 people. The attacks were claimed by the Somalian militant group Al-Shabaab.

In October 2011, a memorial statue was unveiled in Nairobi in memory of Tom Mboya, a former Kenyan Independence politician and assassination victim.

In November 2012, President Mwai Kibaki opened the KES 31 billion Thika Superhighway. This mega-project in Kenya started in 2009 and ended in 2011. It involved expanding the four-lane carriageway to eight lanes, building underpasses, providing interchanges at roundabouts, erecting flyovers and building underpasses to ease congestion. The 50.4-kilometre road was built in three phases: Uhuru Highway to Muthaiga Roundabout; Muthaiga Roundabout to Kenyatta University and; Kenyatta University to Thika Town.

In May 2017, President Uhuru Kenyatta inaugurated the Standard Gauge Railway, which connects Nairobi to Mombasa. It was primarily built by a Chinese firm with about 90% of total funding from China and about 10% from the Kenyan government. A second phase is also being built, which will link Naivasha to the existing route and also the Uganda border.

In August 2020, Nairobi County Assembly Speaker Beatrice Elachi resigned. In December 2020, recently elected Nairobi County Assembly Speaker Benson Mutura was sworn in as acting Nairobi Governor four days after the previous Nairobi Governor Mike Sonko was impeached and removed from office. At the time of Mutura's swearing in as acting Governor, which he will hold for at least 60 days, Nairobi did not have a Deputy Governor as well.

Nairobi has seen several major infrastructure projects in recent years. The Nairobi Expressway, completed in 2022, was developed to reduce traffic congestion along Mombasa Road. In 2021, the Green Park Bus Terminal, part of efforts to improve public transport, began operations. In line with the Kenyan government's Affordable Housing Program, various housing developments are underway to accommodate the city's growing population.

== See also ==
- Timeline of Nairobi history
- History of Kenya
