= 2013 Nairobi local elections =

2013 Kenyan local government election

Local elections were held in Nairobi County to elect a Governor and County Assembly on 4 March 2013. Under the new constitution, which was passed in a 2010 referendum, the 2013 general election was the first where there would be election of County governors and their deputies for the 47 newly created counties. They were also the first general elections run by the Independent Electoral and Boundaries Commission(IEBC) which has released the official list of candidates. While it is not necessary to hold a degree to become e.g. president of the United States, a degree from a university recognised in Kenya is necessary to run for a gubernatorial seat.

== Gubernatorial election ==
Candidate	Running Mate	Coalition	Party	Votes
Arita, Eric Mokua	Mumma, Tom Ignatius		FORD–People	4068
Kihoro, Wanyiri	Odula, Odhiambo		Independent	4539
Kidero, Evans Odhiambo	Mueke, J. Mwangangi	Cord	Orange Democratic Movement	692483
Kisia, Philip Mwala	Atito, Martin Onyango	Cord	Federal Party of Kenya	5162
Kobia, Geoffrey Thuku	Wanjiku, Rose Anne	Jubilee	National Rainbow Coalition	5314
Mbaru, Jimnah Mwangi	Ibrahim, Ahmed	N/A	Alliance Party of Kenya	52084
Muchumu, Joseph Mwangi	Ochieng, Godfrey		Kenya National Congress	1725
Mutinda, Richard Kavemba	Nyangangali, Crispus Fwamba		WDM-K	7490
Ngok, Alice Chepkirui	Nyakundi, Elijah Wycliffe		National Vision Party	3823
Waititu, Ferdinand Ndungu	Achoki, Robin Manono	Jubilee	The National Alliance	617839

== Opinion Polling ==
Pollster	Date	Sample	1st	2nd	3rd	Others
Ipsos Synovate	2 – 5 Feb 2013	870	Evans Kidero; 40%	Ferdinand Waititu; 37%	Jimnah Mbaru; 10%	Undecided 8%
Ipsos Synovate	Dec 2012	–	Margaret Wanjiru; 29%	Ferdinand Waititu; 20%	Evans Kidero; 15%	Jimnah Mbaru 11%

== Prospective candidatures ==
The following politicians made public their intentions to run but did not run or failed to obtain nominations in their preferred political parties:

- John Gakuo Former Town Clerk, City Council of Nairobi
- Timothy Muriuki
- Margaret Wanjiru MP for Starehe Constituency

Gakuo and Muriuki failed in the TNA nominations while Wanjiru was barred by her party due to questions over the validity of her university degree.
