= Timeline of Nairobi =

Coordinates: 1.283333°S 36.816667°E

The following is a timeline of the history of the city of Nairobi, Kenya.

== Prior to 20th century ==
- 1899 - Uganda Railway (Mombasa-Nairobi) begins operating; depot built by British.

== 20th century ==
=== 1900s-1920s ===
- 1900 - Incorporated as the Township of Nairobi
- 1901
  - Native Civil hospital opens.
  - The Nairobi Club established
- 1904 - Norfolk Hotel opens.
- 1905
  - British East Africa Protectorate capital moves from Mombasa to Nairobi.
  - Nairobi Parsee Zoroastrian Anjuman Religious and Charitable Funds established.
- 1906
  - Jamia Mosque construction started.
  - Royal Nairobi Golf Club founded.
- 1907 - British Government House built.
- 1909 - East Africa and Uganda Natural History Society established.
- 1910
  - East African Standard newspaper headquartered in Nairobi.
  - Museum of the East Africa and Uganda Natural History Society established.
- 1912 - Theatre Royal opens.
- 1913 - Muthaiga Country Club founded.
- 1914 - Shri Vankaner Vidya Prasarak Mandal established.
- 1917
  - Anjuman Islamia established.
  - East Africa Women's League established.
  - Indian Christian Union formed.
- 1918 - Punjebhai Club formed.
- 1919 - Nairobi Political Association formed.
- 1920
  - Social Service Volunteer Corps established.
  - Majlis-i-Ahl-i-Kashmeer established.

=== 1930s-1950s ===
- 1930 - Coryndon Museum opens.
- 1931 - McMillan lending library (for white settlers) opens.
- 1934 - Sir Ali Muslim Club (cricket) founded.
- 1935 - Nairobi becomes a municipality.
- 1939 - St. Mary's School founded.
- 1944 - Kenya Conservatoire of Music founded.
- 1946 - Nairobi National Park established.
- 1947 - Kenya National Archives headquartered in city.
- 1948
  - East African Literature Bureau founded.
  - Population: 118,976 (urban agglomeration).
- 1949 - American Center Library established.
- 1950 - Nairobi became a city
- 1951 - Railway rerouted via Kibera
- 1952
  - City Council formed.
  - Princess Elizabeth Hospital opens.
- 1953 - Nairobi Dam constructed.
- 1954
  - Legislative Council (Legco) Building opened
  - Ngong Racecourse opens.
  - European Hospital opens.
- 1955
  - Israel Somen elected mayor.
  - Government Indian School renamed Duke of Gloucester School
- 1956
  - Royal Technical College established.
  - East African Library Association headquartered in city.
- 1958
  - Nairobi Embakasi Airport opened
  - Embassy Cinema opened.
  - Thika Rd Drive-In (later renamed Fox Drive-In) opened
  - Kenya Cinema opened
  - New Donovan Maule Theatre opened
  - Aga Khan Hospital opened

=== 1960s-1970s ===
- 1961 - Kenya Polytechnic established.
- 1962 - Nairobi West Airport renamed Wilson Airport
- 1963
  - City becomes capital of Republic of Kenya.
  - Kenya School of Law established.
- 1964 - Abaluhya United Football Club founded.
- 1966 - United Nations Office at Nairobi established.
- 1967
  - National Library Service of Kenya headquartered in city.
  - Kenya Open golf tournament begins.
- 1968
  - Gor Mahia Football Club founded.
  - Swedish school founded.
- 1969
  - July: Political leader Tom Mboya assassinated.
  - Hilton Nairobi built.
- 1970
  - University of Nairobi and Nairobi Japanese School established.
  - Margaret Kenyatta becomes mayor.
  - Tusker Football Club founded.
- 1971 - Nairobi Railway Museum opens.
- 1973
  - Kenyatta International Conference Centre and National Social Security Fund building constructed.
  - City administrators develop municipal "master plan."
  - Population: 630,000 urban agglomeration.
- 1975
  - Uchumi Supermarkets founded.
  - City hosts World Council of Churches conference.
- 1978 - Mazingira Institute founded.

=== 1980s-1990s ===
- 1980 - Nairobi Records Centre of the Kenya National Archives established.
- 1981
  - City hall building expanded.
  - ICEA Building and Cooperative Bank House built.
- 1983
  - Sarit Centre shopping mall opens.
  - Nyayo National Stadium and Nyayo House built.
  - Phoenix Players theatre troupe active.
- 1985
  - Kenyatta University established.
  - Third UN World Conference on Women held from 15 to 26 July 1985
- 1987
  - Moi International Sports Centre built.
  - City hosts All-Africa Games.
- 1989 - Kenya College of Accountancy founded.
- 1990
  - Kenya Television Network founded.
  - Lonrho House built.
  - Population: 1,380,000 (urban agglomeration).
- 1992 - Anniversary Towers built.
- 1994 - Mathare United Football Club founded.
- 1995 - The Village Market shopping center opens.
- 1998 - U.S. embassy bombed.
- 1997 - Kenya Institute for Public Policy Research and Analysis headquartered in city.
- 1999
  - Rahimtulla Tower built.
  - Nairobi Java House opens.
- 2000
  - New Central Bank Tower built.
  - Population: 2,230,000 (urban agglomeration).

== 21st century ==
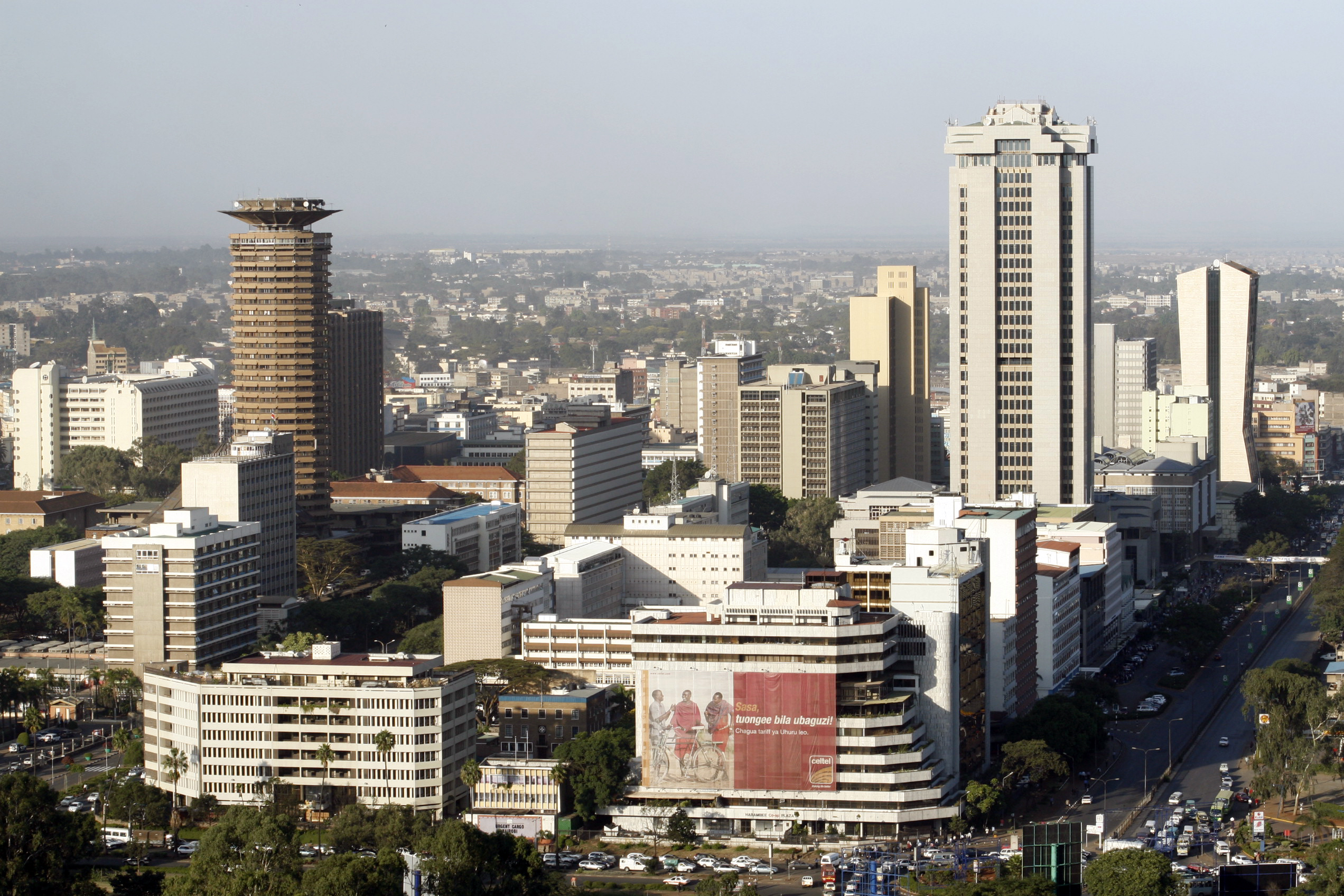
View of Nairobi, 2007

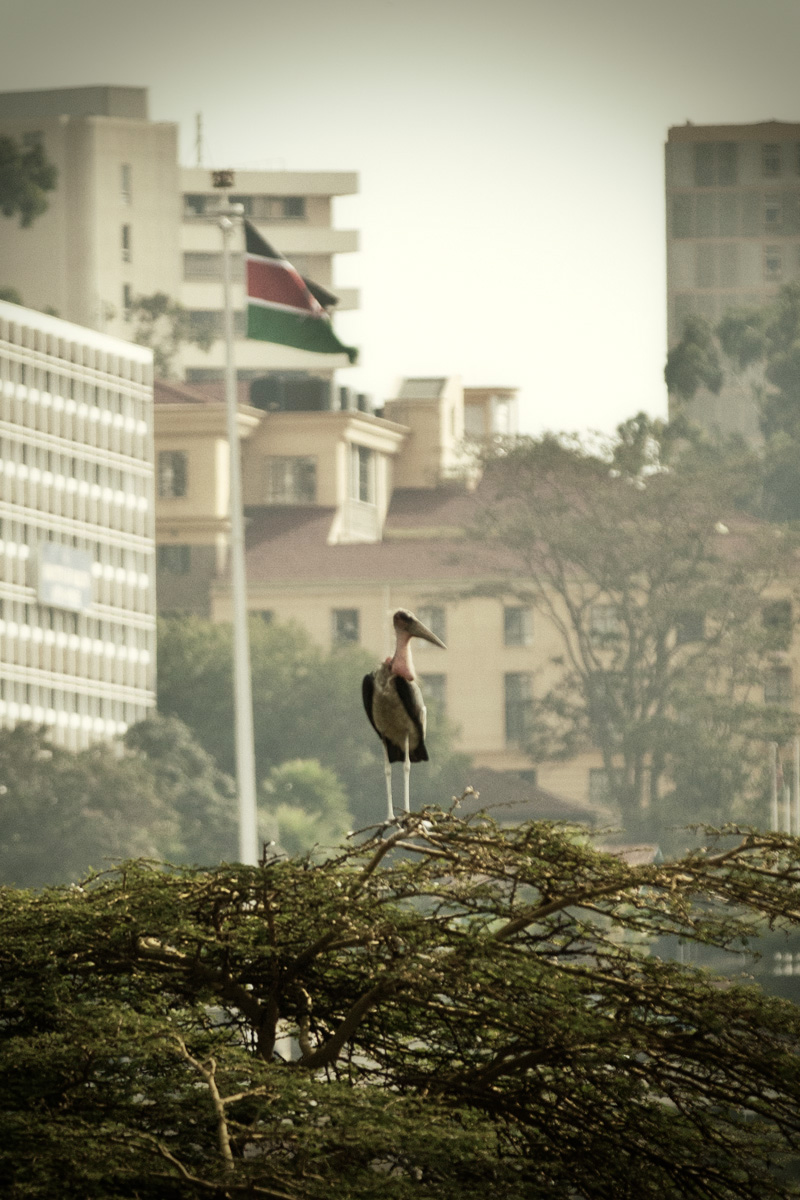
Nairobi, 2011

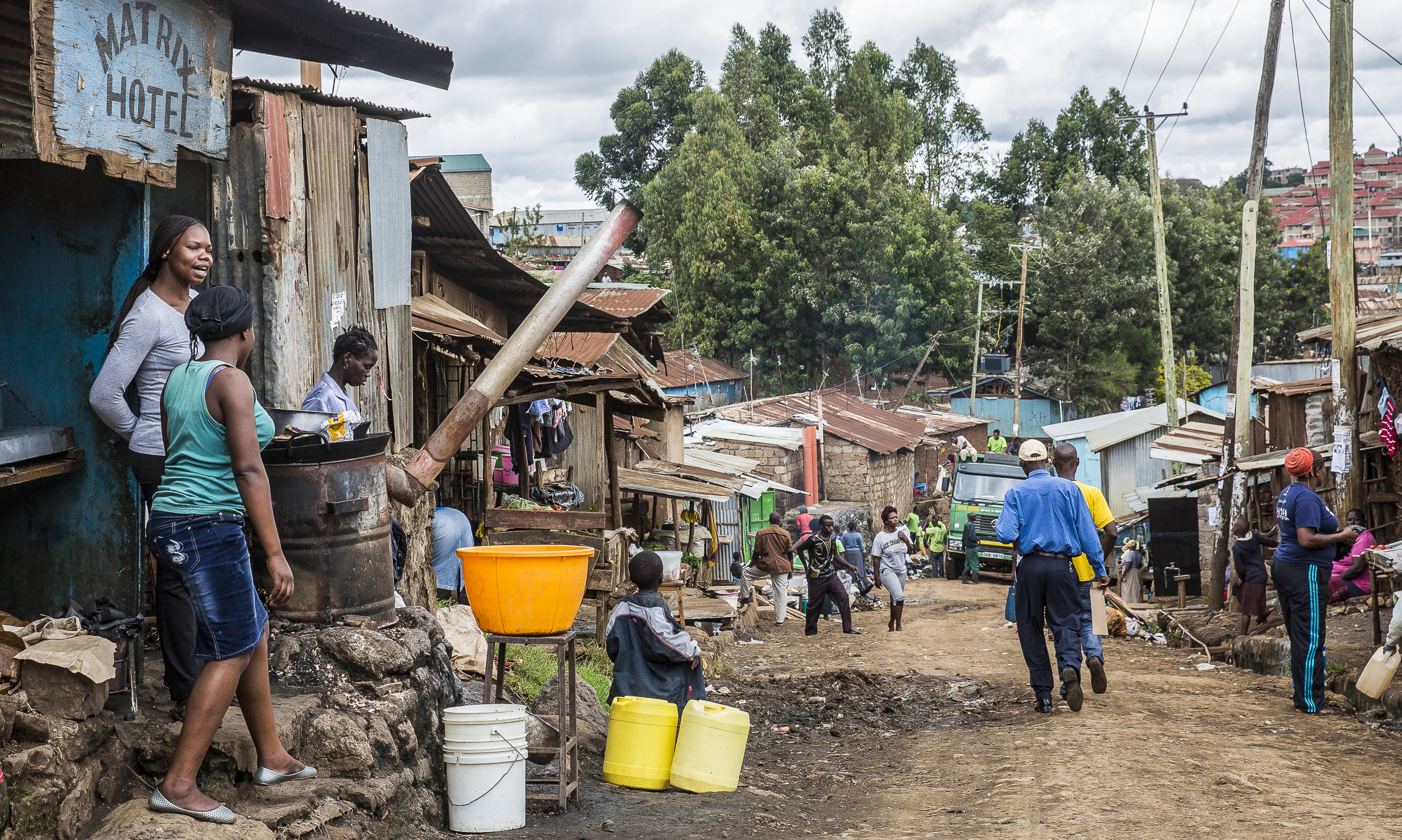
Kibera, Nairobi, 2015

=== 2000s ===
- 2001
  - I&M Bank Tower built.
  - Nairobi Women's Hospital founded.
  - Coalition for Peace in Africa headquartered in Nairobi.
  - Unrest in Kibera.
- 2002
  - Kiriri Women's University of Science and Technology established.
  - World Urban Forum held.
- 2003
  - Nairobi Marathon begins.
  - Dorman's Coffee opens.
  - Kwani? literary journal begins publication.
  - GoDown Arts Centre founded.
- 2004 - Dick Wathika elected mayor.
- 2005
  - July: Political protest.
  - Population: 2,814,000 (urban agglomeration).
- 2006 - www.sheng.co.ke Kenya's first online Sheng Dictionary goes live after major overhaul.
- 2007
  - Nairobi Province administrative districts created.
  - December - Post-election unrest.
- 2008
  - Google office in business.
  - Nairobi National Museum building expanded.
- 2009 - Population: 3,138,369.

=== 2010s ===
- 2010
  - Mayor Geoffrey Majiwa resigns.
  - City hosts African Championships in Athletics.
  - IHub opens.
  - June: Blast occurs during protest in Uhuru Park.
  - Population: 3,109,861 (estimate).
- 2011
  - Petrol pipeline explosion, Sinai slum.
  - Hay Festival of literature held.
  - George Aladwa elected mayor.
- 2012
  - Nairobi-Syokimau railway begins operating.
  - IMAX Nairobi (cinema) opens.
  - Sister city relationship established with Raleigh, US.
- 2013
  - Nairobi County administrative division effected.
  - 4 March: Election held for governor and National Assembly.
  - 7 August: Nairobi airport fire.
  - September: 2013 Women's African Volleyball Championship held.
  - 21–24 September: Westgate shopping mall attack.
  - 14 December: Bus attack in Eastleigh.
- 2014 - Caramel restaurant in business.
- 2015 - July: US president Obama visits city.
- 2017
  - Two Rivers Shopping Complex at the northern boundary shopping centre of Ruaka opened
  - June 1-The first phase of the Mombasa–Nairobi Standard Gauge Railway, built by the China Road & Bridge Construction Company mainly funded by China Exim Bank and the Government of Kenya is inaugurated by President Uhuru Kenyatta.
- 2018 - Part of 2018 African Nations Championship football contest to be played in Nairobi.

== See also ==
- History of Nairobi
- List of mayors of Nairobi, 1923-2012
- Timelines of other cities in Kenya: Mombasa

== Bibliography ==
- Karen Blixen (1937). Out of Africa. London: Putnam. ISBN 0679600213. (Memoir set in Nairobi area circa 1920s)
- Diana Lee-Smith and Davinder Lamba (2000). "Social transformation in a post-colonial city: the case of Nairobi". In Mario Polèse and Richard E. Stren (ed.). The Social Sustainability of Cities: Diversity and the Management of Change. University of Toronto Press. p. 250+. ISBN 978-0-8020-8320-3.
- "Nairobi". Understanding Slums: Case Studies for the Global Report 2003. United Nations Human Settlements Programme and University College London. 2003.
- Paul Tiyambe Zeleza; Dickson Eyoh, eds. (2003). "Nairobi, Kenya". Encyclopedia of Twentieth-Century African History. Routledge. ISBN 0415234794.
- David Levinson, ed. (2004). "Nairobi". Encyclopedia of Homelessness. Sage Publications. p. 403+. ISBN 978-0-7619-2751-8.
- "Inventing a City: Nairobi", National Geographic Magazine, vol. 208, Washington DC, 2005, archived from the original on January 23, 2010
- Nairobi Urban Sector Profile. United Nations Human Settlements Programme. 2006.
- Urban Integration in Africa: A Socio-Demographic Survey of Nairobi, Dakar: Council for the Development of Social Science Research in Africa, 2009
- M. Merino (2010). Déchets et pouvoirs dans les villes africaines: l'action publique de gestion des déchets à Nairobi de 1964 à 2002 (in French). Maison des sciences de l'homme d’Aquitaine. ISBN 978-2-85892-367-0.
- Sanctuary in the City? Urban Displacement and Vulnerability in Nairobi, London: Overseas Development Institute, 2011 – via International Relations and Security Network
- Simon Bekker and Goran Therborn, ed. (2011), "Nairobi", Capital Cities in Africa: Power and Powerlessness, Dakar: Council for the Development of Social Science Research in Africa, ISBN 978-2-8697-8495-6
