= Mboya =

Mboya is a surname. Notable people with the surname include:

- Edward Mboya (born 1982), Kenyan cricketer
- Hlubi Mboya (born 1978), South African actress
- Pamela Mboya (1938–2009), Kenyan political activist and diplomat, wife of Tom
- Susan Mboya, Kenyan business executive
- Tom Mboya (1930–1969), Kenyan politician
