= Gwladys Cholmondeley, Baroness Delamere =

Kenyian politician (1898–1943)

The Lady Delamere CBE

Mayor of Nairobi
- In office 1938–1940
- Preceded by: Joseph Mortimer
- Succeeded by: Ernest Albert Vasey

Personal details
- Born: Gwladys Helen Beckett; 17 January 1898 Cadogan Square
- Died: 22 February 1943 (aged 45)
- Resting place: Soysambu Conservancy
- Spouses: Sir Charles Markham (m. 1920; div. 1927) Hugh Cholmondeley, 3rd Baron Delamere (m. 1928; died 1931)
- Parents: Rupert Evelyn Beckett; Muriel Paget
- Relatives: Henry Paget, 2nd Marquess of Anglesey (great-grandfather)

Gwladys Helen Cholmondeley, Baroness Delamere, CBE (née Beckett; 17 January 1898 – 22 February 1943), formerly Lady Markham, was the first female Mayor of Nairobi from 1938 to 1940. She was awarded her CBE in 1941 for public services in Kenya. In March 1941 she gave evidence at the trial in Kenya of Sir Henry John Delves Broughton for the murder of Josslyn Hay, 22nd Earl of Erroll. She died on 22 February 1943 and was buried at Soysambu.

== Childhood ==
Gwladys Helen Beckett was the daughter of Rupert Evelyn Beckett and Muriel Helen Florence Paget. Muriel was a granddaughter of Henry Paget, 2nd Marquess of Anglesey. In 1901 she was photographed with her mother for a full page in Tatler. In 1902 it was reported that she had been bridesmaid to Lady Helen Stewart (daughter of Charles Vane-Tempest-Stewart, 6th Marquess of Londonderry), who married Giles Fox-Strangways, 6th Earl of Ilchester. In 1903, she was bridesmaid for Mary Willoughby, who was marrying Arthur Ramsay, 14th Earl of Dalhousie. She had her coming-out in 1915.

== Marriages ==
Gwladys's first marriage took place in 1920 to Sir Charles Markham of Newstead Abbey, the son of the late Sir Arthur Markham. The grand wedding was reported in detail in The Yorkshire Post. She divorced him in 1927.

In May 1928 she became engaged to Hugh Cholmondeley, 3rd Baron Delamere, thirty years her senior, in Nairobi. They subsequently married. Lord Delamere died in November 1931, at the age of 61, leaving Gwladys Lady Delamere as his widow.

== Kenya ==
In 1928, Gwladys travelled to Kenya with the Prince of Wales. Her social behaviour drew attention – Isak Dinesen wrote in November that "Lady Delamere behaved scandalously at supper, I thought; she bombarded the Prince of Wales with big pieces of bread ... and finished up by rushing at him, overturning his chair and rolling him around on the floor." However, during the 1929-31 famine when the Soysambu area was devastated by locusts, Gwladys took over the management of a hotel that Delamere had opened in Iringa in 1926 and made it pay its way. Despite Dinesen's 1928 comments, the Delameres were back in the Prince's company in 1930.

=== Mayor of Nairobi ===
In 1934, Gwladys was elected to Nairobi Council. She became deputy mayor on 2 July 1935. She visited England to stay at Wilton, Wiltshire for Christmas 1936. She returned, after a well-attended leaving party thrown by her parents, reportedly to take up the office of mayor. The Yorkshire Post explained that she had become the first woman member of the Municipal Council ("second only to the Legislative Council") two years previously. She had become deputy mayor after one year and then acting mayor for six months while the mayor was sick. She was invited in July 1936 to become mayor but asked to defer this until after her visit to England. The article went on to discuss the challenges of urban growth facing Nairobi at the time and noted that the Council's duties included brewing and retailing beer along similar lines to the England's State Management Scheme experiment in Carlisle.

If she had become mayor on her return in 1937, she would have succeeded Thomas Alfred Wood who had previously been mayor in 1927-29 when Gladwys first arrived in Kenya. She actually held the post for three terms from 1938. It was reported at the time that her 1939 election for her second term was unopposed by Indian members of the council.

=== Trial of Sir Delves Broughton ===
In 1941 she gave evidence for the prosecution at the White Mischief trial. In dramatisations of events surrounding the trial, her character was played by Susan Fleetwood in the film White Mischief (1987) and on television by Julia St. John in Julian Fellowes Investigates: A Most Mysterious Murder (2005) - episode 4 The Case of the Earl of Erroll.

== Death ==
Gwladys died on 22 February 1943. Her obituaries confined themselves to her position as Mayor of Nairobi and her CBE. Her funeral was attended by the Governor of Kenya and Commander-in-Chief in East Africa. Her coffin was carried by representatives of the three fighting services. The Times reported that among the wreaths was one from General Smuts, the Prime Minister of South Africa.

In The Ghosts of Happy Valley: Searching for the Lost World of Africa's Infamous Aristocrats, Juliet Barnes writes that Gwladys was sometimes portrayed as "a bossy, bitchy and emotionally unbalanced woman, endlessly carousing at Muthaiga Club with Happy Valleyites" but also "how she selflessly looked after Delamere in his twilight years. She was apparently highly popular and during the war she always made all ranks welcome at her Loresho home, unlike many more snobbish families." She later gave the home to the Kenya Red Cross Service.

Gwladys returned to the news in 2007 when there was media interest surrounding the trial of Thomas Cholmondeley, Delamere's great-grandson, for shooting a poacher. While that was taking place, Gwladys's grave was desecrated and the police looked for a connection with the trial.
