= Mayor of Nairobi =

The mayor of Nairobi was the non-executive head of Nairobi City Council in Nairobi, Kenya until the new constitution of 2010 which devolved government was enacted. The mayor's office, officially the Mayor’s Palour, was located at City Hall Nairobi. The last mayor of Nairobi was George Aladwa of ODM, elected on 10 August 2011.

There was no mayor of Nairobi from 1983 to 1992 because the City Council of Nairobi was replaced by the City Commission appointed by then president Daniel Toroitich Arap Moi. The City Council was restored after the multi-party elections of 1992. In the year 2013 the office of mayor ceased to exist since under the Constitution of Kenya, 2010 local governments were replaced by county governments.

The following is a list of the mayors of Nairobi from the time the city was a colonial town.

Mayor	Term begin	Term end	Notes
Harold Edgar Henderson	1923	1924	1st mayor of Nairobi. Died 10 Jul 1948
Charles Udall	1924	1925	Died 4 Jan 1966
James Riddell	1925	1927	Died 15 Jan 1962
Alfred Thomas Wood	1927	1929	Died 19 Apr 1944
Charles Udall	1929	1930	Died 4 Jan 1966
Franze Rudolf Mayer	1930	1931	Died 26 Dec 1934
James Riddell	1931	1933	Died 15 Jan 1962
Joseph Mortimer	1933	1934	Died 24 Nov 1948
Edward (George) Gwinnett Bompas	1934	1936	Died 31 Mar 1949
Alfred Thomas Wood	1936	1937	Died April 1944
Joseph Mortimer	1937	1938	Died 24 November 1948
Gwladys, Lady Delamere	1938	1940	First female mayor of Nairobi. Died 22 Feb 1943
Ernest Albert Vasey	1941	1942	Died 10 Jan 1984
Charles Udall	1942	1944	Died 4 Jan 1966
Ernest Albert Vasey	1944	1946	Died 10 Jan 1984
Tyson George Alfred	1946	1947	Died 12 Mar 1972
Frederick George Richard Woodley	1949	1950	Died 6 Oct 1971
Norman Harris	1950	1952	Died 1994
Dr. Joseph Richard Gregory	1952	1953	Died 5 Mar 1979
Harold Travis	1953	1954	Died 23 Aug 1973
Reggie S. Alexander	1954	1955	First mayor of Nairobi born in Kenya. Died 31 March 1990.
Israel Somen	1957	1959	Died 9 Oct 1984
Marjorie Needham-Clarke	1959	1960	2nd female mayor of Nairobi
Harold Travis	1961	1962	The last European mayor of Nairobi. Died 23 Aug 1973
Charles Rubia	1963	1967	The first African mayor of Nairobi. Died 23 Dec 2019
Isaac Lugonzo	1967	1970	
Margaret Kenyatta	1970	1976	3rd female mayor of Nairobi. Died 5 April 2017
Andrew Ngumba	1977	1980	31 May 1997
Nathan Kahara	1980	1983	
Abolished	1983	1992	Nairobi City Commission had been established to replace the Nairobi City Council.
Steve Flavian Mwangi	1993	1994	
Dick Waweru	1994	1996	Died 19 Dec 2015
John King'ori	1996	1998	Died 22 Jan 2021
Sammy Mbugua	1998	1999	
John Ndirangu	1999	2001	
Dick Waweru	2001	2002	Died 19 Dec 2015
Joe Aketch	2003	2004	
Dickson Wathika	2004	2008	
Geoffrey Majiwa	2008	2010	
George Aladwa	2011	2013	

== See also ==
- Timeline of Nairobi
