= Catherine Muyeka Mumma =

Kenyan politician

Catherine Mumma CBS

Nominated Senator
- Incumbent
- Assumed office 16 August 2022

Personal details
- Party: ODM
- Education: University of Nairobi (LLB); Queen Mary University of London (LLM)
- Occupation: Legislator; human rights advocate; lawyer
- Website: cathymumma.com

Catherine Muyeka Mumma is a Kenyan lawyer and human rights advocate who also serves as a senator in the upper house of the Kenyan parliament.

== Education ==
Mumma attended the University of Nairobi for her undergraduate studies. She graduated with a bachelor's degree in law. In 1994 she graduated from Queen Mary University of London with a master's degree in law.

== Career ==
=== Civil service ===
Mumma began her legal practice as a State Counsel in the Office of the Attorney General in 1995. During her tenure, she collaboratively worked with other stakeholders on initiating the drafting of the law that informed the development of the Breast Milk Substitutes Act, enacted in 2012.

She was a commissioner at the Kenya National Commission of Human Rights between 29 July 2003 and 29 July 2006.

In 2008, Mumma was appointed as a commissioner on the Kriegler Commission, an independent review commission which was established to inquire into the presidential elections of Kenya that were held on 27 December 2007 and make recommendations for reviewing the constitutional, legal, and structural framework for governing future elections in Kenya. The commission was chaired by Johann Kriegler. The commission recommended comprehensive reforms to Kenya's electoral management system, including restructuring the Electoral Commission of Kenya or establishing a new electoral body with a revised institutional framework, transparent appointment processes, and a professional secretariat to strengthen electoral administration and integrity.

From 4 January 2011 to 2015, she was a member of the Commission for the Implementation of the Constitution, where she contributed to monitoring and overseeing the implementation of the 2010 Constitution of Kenya.

=== Legislature ===
Mumma was nominated to the Senate of Kenya by the Orange Democratic Movement on 16 August 2022 to represent women. She is a member of the Speaker's Panel, vice chairperson of the Senate Committee on Devolution and Intergovernmental Relations, and also sits on the Education and Agriculture committees.

Prior to her nomination, she served in the Orange Democratic Movement as the chairperson of the National Election Board.

As a senator, she has sponsored the Tobacco Control (Amendment) Bill of 2024 that aims to introduce stricter regulations on the production, sale, advertising, and use of nicotine products.

== Publications ==
- Mumma, Catherine Muyeka. "Reconciling Competing Rights." Gender and Human Rights in the Commonwealth: Some Critical Issues for Action in the Decade 2005-2015 (2004): 62.
- Kriegler, J., Aboud, I., M'Marete, M., Mumma, C., Kambuni, L., Away, F. A., Borneo, H., & Elklit, J. (2008). Report of the Independent Review Commission on the General Elections held in Kenya on 27th December 2007. Government Printer.
- Mumma, Catherine Muyeka; Maleche, Allan Achesa; Oluoch, Jessica Achieng’ (2021-07-30). "Facilitating Legal Aid Through Traditional Dispute Resolution Mechanisms: Widows Access Justice Through the Luo Council Of Elders". Egerton Law Journal. 1 (1–192). ISSN 2789-3421.

== Awards and recognition ==
Mumma was awarded with a Chief of the Order of the Burning Spear (CBS) commendation by President Ruto in December 2025.
