= George Koimburi Ndung'u =

Kenyan politician

George Koimburi Ndung'u MP

Member of Parliament for Juja Constituency
- Incumbent
- Assumed office 8 June 2021
- Preceded by: Francis Munyua Waititu

Personal details
- Party: United Democratic Alliance

George Ndung'u Koimburi is Kenyan politician who currently serves as the Member of Parliament for the Juja Constituency in Kiambu County.He is a member of the United Democratic Alliance.

== Education ==
Koimburi graduated from Kianjoya Primary School in 1990 and Evalakala Secondary School in 1994 and holds a Certificate in Human Resource Management from Jomo Kenyatta University of Agriculture and Techonology.
