= Commission for the Implementation of the Constitution =

The Commission for the Implementation of the Constitution (CIC) of Kenya is a government Commission established under the Constitution of Kenya to ensure smooth implementation of the 2010 Constitution of Kenya.

== Roles ==
The commission's roles include:

- Monitor, facilitate and oversee the development of legislation and administrative procedures required to implement the Constitution
- Co-ordinate with the Attorney-General and the Kenya Law Reform Commission in preparing, for tabling in Parliament, the legislation required to implement the Constitution
- Report regularly to the Constitutional Implementation Oversight Committee on:
  - progress in the implementation of the Constitution
  - Any impediments to its implementation
- Work with each constitutional commission to ensure that the letter and spirit of the Constitution is respected.

== Lifetime of the Commissions ==
The Commission will be dissolved five years after it is established or when the Constitution is fully implementation - whichever is sooner. Full implementation will be determined by Parliament but it may, by resolution, extend the commission's life.

== Membership ==
The current membership of the Commission is as follows:

- Charles Nyachae (Chairman)
- Dr. Elizabeth Muli
- Dr. Florence Omosa
- Philemon Mwaisaka
- Dr. Ibrahim M. Ali
- Catherine Muyeka Mumma
- Kamotho Waiganjo
- Prof. Peter Wanyande
- Imaana Kibaaya Laibuta
