= Interim Independent Electoral Commission (Kenya) =

The Interim Independent Electoral Commission of Kenya (IIEC) was set up on May 7, 2009. The commission was set up to replace the previously disbanded Electoral Commission of Kenya that was widely blamed for the election violence after the Kenyan general election, 2007. The commissioners were sworn in on May 11, 2009.

== Commissioners ==
- Ahmed Issack Hassan- Chair
- Simiyu Abuid Wasike
- Winnie Guchu
- Yusuf Nzibo
- Davis Chirchir
- Douglas Mwashigadi
- Hamara Ibrahim Adan
- Ken Nyaundi
- Tiyah Galgalo

The Interim Independent Electoral Commission was later replaced by the Independent Electoral and Boundaries Commission (IEBC).

== See also ==
- Constitution of Kenya
- Harmonized Draft Constitution of Kenya, 2009
- Kriegler Commission
- 10th Kenyan Parliament
- Interim Independent Boundaries Review Commission of Kenya
