= James Nyoro =

Kenyan politician and economist

James Karanja Nyoro

Governor Kiambu County
- In office 19 December 2019 – 2022
- Preceded by: Ferdinand Waititu
- Succeeded by: Kimani Wamatangi

Personal details
- Party: Jubilee Party of Kenya
- Education: Ngenia Boys High School
- Alma mater: University of Nairobi

James Karanja Nyoro is a Kenyan agricultural economist and politician who served as the third governor of Kiambu County. He studied at Ngenia Boys High School in Limuru and the University of Nairobi, and received further training at Wayne College in London. Before entering politics, he worked in agricultural development, including serving as managing director at the Rockefeller Foundation.

In 2013, he contested the Kiambu gubernatorial election but was unsuccessful. In 2016, he was appointed an adviser on agriculture and policy in the office of the Deputy President. Ahead of the 2017 general election, he expressed interest in challenging incumbent governor William Kabogo, but withdrew his candidacy in support of Ferdinand Waititu under the United for Kiambu Alliance. In February 2020, Nyoro became governor following Waititu's removal from office through impeachment.
