= Evans Kidero =

Kenyan politician (born 1957)

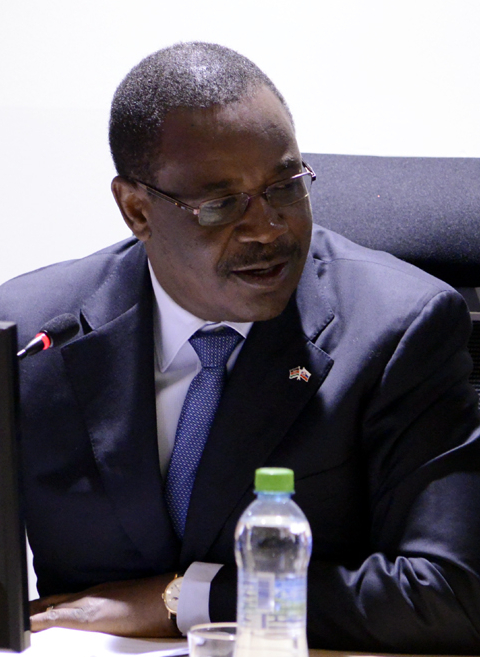
- Evans Kidero (2015)

1st Governor of Nairobi City County
- In office 27 March 2013 – 21 August 2017
- Deputy: Jonathan Mwangangi Mueke
- Preceded by: Position established
- Succeeded by: Mike Sonko

Personal details
- Born: Evans Odhiambo Kidero; 20 May 1957 (age 68) Nairobi, Kenya
- Party: ODM
- Spouse: Susan Mboya (m. 2011)
- Children: 3
- Education: BPharm; MBA
- Alma mater: University of Nairobi; USIU
- Profession: Pharmacist
- Website: www.evanskidero.co.ke

Evans Odhiambo Kidero (born 20 May 1957) is a Kenyan politician and former Governor of Nairobi County. He was CEO of Mumias Sugar Company for 8 years, resigning in 2012 to join elective politics.

== Early life ==
Kidero was born in Majengo as the eldest in a family of seven. He did his O level at Agoro Sare High School, and then for his A level, attended Mangu High School, where he eventually became head boy, also known as prefect. He graduated from the University of Nairobi in 1983 with a degree in pharmacy and went on to obtain a master's in business administration at the Kenyan United States International University in 1990. He was CEO of the Mumias Sugar Company for eight years before resigning from that position in 2012 to pursue a career in politics.

== Political career ==
Kidero was elected as the first governor of Nairobi County in the Nairobi gubernatorial elections of 2013 on an ODM ticket.

Following a petition by Ferdinand Waititu, who ran against him in the gubernatorial election, Kidero was ousted as Nairobi Governor, with the court citing electoral malpractices. Kidero was later reinstated by the Supreme Court following an appeal that overturned the decision of the Court of Appeal. In 2017 elections, Evans Kidero lost to Mike Sonko in the Nairobi gubernatorial election.

Dr. Kidero is married to Susan Mboya, daughter of the late Kenyan politician, Tom Mboya. He has three children from a previous marriage to the late Abigail Odhiambo Kidero.

== Graft Charges And Arrest ==
In August 2018, Evans was arrested on charges of abuse of office, money laundering, and bribery. In October 2018, it was further revealed the Ethics and Anti-Corruption Commission was investigating him for alleged embezzlement of public funds while at the helm of Nairobi County and the Mumias Sugar Company Limited. According to Kenya’s Ethics and Anti-Corruption Commission’s investigations, Kidero’s worth is Sh9 billion in terms of assets.

== See also ==
- Timeline of Nairobi
