= Jaguar (musician) =

Kenyan singer and politician

Personal details
- Born: Charles Njagua Kanyi; 28 March 1986; Othaya
- Occupation: singer; politician
- In office 9 August 2017 – 9 August 2022
- Preceded by: Maina Kamanda
- Musical career
- Genres: Afropop

Charles Njagua Kanyi, professionally known as Jaguar, is a Kenyan politician, singer, and philanthropist.

== Early life and education ==
Kanyi attended Magutuini Primary School in Thogoto, Kiambu and later enrolled at Senior Chief Koinange Secondary School, where he took his Kenya Certificate of Secondary Education examination (KCSE).

== Music career ==
Jaguar released his debut single "Utaweza Kweli" under the Mandugu Digitali record label in 2004. He became a part of the East African music production team, Ogopa Deejays, in 2005. During his time with Ogopa Deejays, he released several singles, including his most well-received track "kigeugeu". In 2013, Jaguar began recording at Main Switch Studios, which was founded by his long-serving record producer, Philip Makanda, formerly of Ogopa Deejays.

He has since recorded multiple singles, including "Kipepeo", "Kioo", and "One centimeter", featuring popular Nigerian recording artist, Iyanya. He also collaborated with the well-known South African duo, Mafikizolo, in a single titled "Going Nowhere".

== Political career ==
In 2015, Kanyi was elected as the director of the National Campaign Against Alcohol and Drug Abuse, a position he held for two years. He also became a member of the Departmental Committee on Labour and Social Welfare.

On 9 August 2017, Kanyi was elected to represent the Starehe constituency in Nairobi under the Jubilee Party, having secured more votes than his competitors Steve Mbogo, Boniface Mwangi, and Mwaniki Kwenya. Prior to this, he had surpassed the incumbent Member of Parliament, Starehe Maina Kamanda, in a nomination race for the Jubilee Party ticket in April 2017.

On 24 January 2022, Kanyi affiliated himself with the United Democratic Alliance to contest for reelection in the Starehe constituency.
