= Jonathan Mwangangi Mueke =

Kenyan politician

Jonathan Mueke
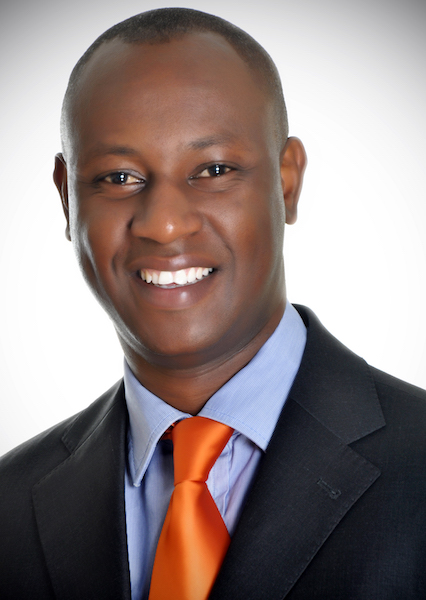
- Born: 4 November 1976 (age 49); Nairobi, Kenya
- Occupation: Former deputy Governor of Nairobi County

Jonathan Mueke (born 4 November 1976) is a Kenyan politician and the current Principal Secretary for State Department for Livestock Development. He is also the former Deputy Governor of Nairobi County.

== Early life and education ==
Mueke's parents are Frank Mueke, a medical doctor and Juliana Mueke, a nurse by profession. Mueke was educated at the Nairobi Baptist Church, Kilimani Primary School and the Nairobi School. He subsequently enrolled at Wayne State University in the United States and majored in Bsc. Computer Science and minored in Business Administration. He then attended Oakland University for an MBA, double Major in Global Information Technology and Entrepreneurship.

== Personal life ==
Jonathan is married to Catherine Mueke; they have two children.

== Political career ==
In the 2007 elections, Mueke unsuccessfully contested the Westlands parliamentary seat. In 2013 Mueke was the deputy in Evans Kidero's gubernatorial bid and they were elected as Nairobi County Governor and Deputy Governor respectively. The Deputy Governor's office has responsibility for the following sectors:

1. Infrastructure, public works & transport
2. Commerce, trade, tourism & cooperatives
3. Agriculture & forestry, and
4. ICT, youth & social services
