= Interim Independent Boundaries Review Commission of Kenya =

The Interim Independent Boundaries Review Commission of Kenya or IIBRC was set up by an Act of Parliament on May 12, 2009. They were charged with the mandate to review the existing constituency boundaries to reflect geographical size and population.

Commissioners

- Andrew Ligale - Chairman
- Jedida Ntoyai
- Irene Masit
- Mwenda Makathimo
- Joseph Kaguthi
- Dr John Nkinyangi
- Murshid Abdalla
- Eng. Abdulahi Sharawe
- Rozaah Buyu.

The commission expected to complete its task of defining boundaries by January, 2011. The new constitution promulgated on August 27, 2010, however cut short their term to November 27, 2010. The Independent Electoral and Boundaries Commission(IEBC) Bill approved by parliament on May 31, 2011, was assented to an Act on July 5, 2011, by President Kibaki. Once the new commissioners are nominated and approved, this body will take over the roles and responsibilities of the current IIEC and the defunct IIBRC.

They were unsuccessful in publishing a list of 290 constituencies that they had generated in the Kenya Gazette after a court injunction blocking them was granted by Lady Justice Jeanne Gacheche of the High Court of Kenya. An attempt by the IIBRC team to squash the ruling by Lady Justice Jeanne Gacheche was struck down again by Justice Daniel Musinga when he upheld the previous ruling. He reiterated that the Ligale commission had acted outside of the provisions of the 6th schedule of the new constitution. The court stated that on a reading Article 89(9) and Section 27(1)(b), the IIBRC was required to determine the "names and details of the boundaries of the constituencies and wards" and then publish them in the Gazette. He cited that without clear borders, voter statistics could not be determined.

He, however, ruled that the Chairman Andrew Ligale's holding of the office was constitutional. The new constitution stipulates that a person who held a political office in the last five years is ineligible to serve on such a commission such as the IIBRC.

The injunction by the High Court caused a major division politically and has led to the current impasse on implementing the new constitution. On November 25, 2010, a group of MP's threatened that they would not approve the Commission on Implementation of the Constitution and Revenue Allocation Commission if the Ligale report was not gazetted. The same evening, 169 MPs voted to adjourn the motion that could have confirmed the members of the Commission on Implementation of the Constitution.

== See also ==
- Constitution of Kenya
- Harmonized Draft Constitution of Kenya, 2009
- 10th Kenyan Parliament
- Interim Independent Electoral Commission of Kenya
