= Pamela Mboya =

Kenyan political activist (1938–2009)

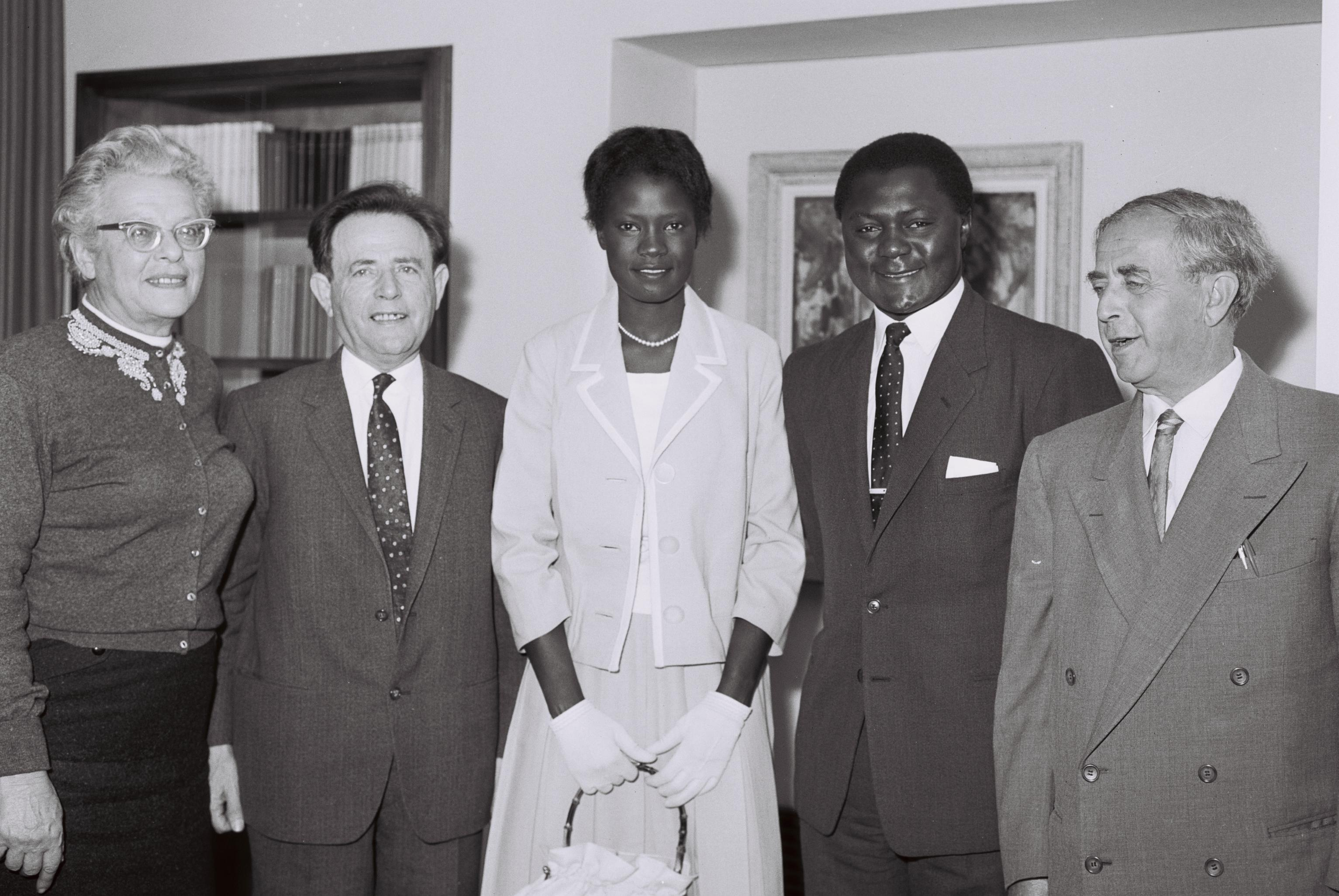
- Pamela Mboya on honeymoon with Tom Mboya, 1962
- Born: Pamela Odede; 1938; Maseno, Kenya
- Died: 26 January 2009 (aged 70–71); South Africa
- Education: Makerere University; Western College for Women
- Occupations: Political activist, diplomat, educator
- Known for: Kenya's permanent representative to UN Habitat; political activism; widow of Tom Mboya
- Spouse: Tom Mboya (m. 1962–1969)
- Children: 6 (including Maureen Odero and Susan Mboya)

Pamela Mboya (1938 – 26 January 2009) was a Kenyan political activist and diplomat, the wife of Tom Mboya the Kenyan trade unionist, educationist, Pan Africanist, author, independence activist, Cabinet Minister and one of the founding fathers of the Republic of Kenya.

== Early life and education ==
Pamela Odede was born at Maseno, near Lake Victoria. Her father Walter Odede was a politician. She studied art at Makerere University from 1957 to 1959. Pamela was a beneficiary of the Kennedy Airlifts in 1959. She earned a bachelor's degree in sociology at Western College for Women in Oxford, Ohio.

== Career ==
Pamela Odede married Thomas Mboya in 1962, in a large Roman Catholic wedding. She was widowed when he was assassinated on 5 July 1969. Images of Pamela Mboya as a glamorous bride, and as a young widow grieving, became iconic in Kenya's turbulent 1960s and 1970s; the name "Pamela" even became trendy for Kenyan girls after her influence. Pamela Mboya was frequently photographed as a hostess with international visitors: during her marriage, she danced with Prince Philip to celebrate Kenya's independence in 1964; after she was widowed, she visited with Coretta Scott King and other survivors of loss by assassination.

Pamela Mboya was Kenya's permanent representative to the UN Habitat in the 1980s. She chaired HelpAge Kenya, and was a member of the Kenyan Women's Political Caucus.

== Personal life ==
Pamela and Tom Mboya had five children together, one of whom died as a young boy. After she was widowed, she had another son with her brother-in law, in accordance to Luo tradition, whom she named Tom Mboya, Jr. in his honour.

Pamela Mboya died from ovarian cancer in 2009, aged 70 years, in South Africa.

Her daughter Maureen Odero is a Judge of the High Court of Kenya, and her daughter Susan Mboya is the immediate former president of the Coca-Cola Africa Foundation and the wife of Evans Kidero, former governor of Nairobi City County.
