= Kabete Constituency =

Electoral constituency in Kenya

Kabete
- constituency for the Parliament of Kenya
- Kabete Constituency within Kiambu County

- Kiambu County within Kenya
- County: Kiambu
- Population: 199,653
- Area: 61 km^{2} (23.6 sq mi)

Current constituency
- Number of members: 1
- Party: UDA
- Member of Parliament: James Githua Kamau Wamacukuru
- Wards: 5

Kabete Constituency is one of twelve electoral constituencies within Kiambu County that neighbours Westlands Constituency in Nairobi County, Kenya. The constituency has a population of 199,653 people and occupies an approximate area of 61 km^{2}.

A study in 2005 revealed that Kabete Constituency had the lowest poverty rate in Kenya.

In 2012 Kikuyu Constituency, previously part of Kabete constituency, was split off following the growth of population within the area.

George Muchai, member of parliament for Kabete Constituency and Deputy Secretary General of the Central Organization of Trade Unions, was shot dead by unknown assailants in Nairobi on February 7, 2015. Muchai had in 2014 alleged rampant embezzlement, misappropriation and mismanagement of workers' deductions which translated into Sh190 billion.

He was succeeded by Ferdinand Waititu who was sworn in on 26 May 2015 during a special parliamentary sitting after winning the election in a landslide victory, winning over 90% of the total votes cast. Waititu is a former Member of Parliament for Embakasi Constituency. After being declared the winner he promised to offer good leadership and indicated that during the next elections he would be a candidate for the post of governor in Kiambu County.

In 2017, James Githua Kamau was elected as the new member of parliament and won the subsequent election in 2022.

Kabete constituency has five county assembly wards as indicated below:

County Assembly Wards in Kabete Constituency
Ward Number	Name:	Approximate Population :	Approprimate Area :	Short Description:
0591	Gitaru Ward	29,177	13.50 km^{2} (5.21 sq mi)	Comprises Gitaru, Kanyariri, and Chura Sub–Locations of Kiambu County
0592	Muguga Ward	27,527	15.30 km^{2} (5.91 sq mi)	Comprises Muguga, Kahuho and Ruku Sub–Locations of Kiambu County
0593	Nyathuna Ward	28,771	17.80 km^{2} (6.87 sq mi)	Comprises Nyathuna, Kirangari, Karura and Gathiga Sub–Locations of Kiambu County
0594	Kabete Ward	30,657	10.10 km^{2} (3.90 sq mi)	Comprises Lower Kabete and Kibichiku Sub–Locations of Kiambu County
0595	Uthiru Ward	24,295	3.50 km^{2} (1.35 sq mi)	Comprises Uthiru Sub-Location of Kiambu County
