= Charles Rubia =

Kenyan mayor

Hon. Charles Wanyoike Rubia

Mayor of Nairobi
- In office 1962–1967
- Preceded by: Harold Travis
- Succeeded by: Isaac Lugonzo

Member of Parliament for Starehe Constituency
- In office 1969–1988

Personal details
- Born: 1923 Kenya
- Died: December 23, 2019 (aged 95–96) Karen, Nairobi, Kenya
- Party: Kenya African National Union (KANU)
- Occupation: Politician
- Known for: First African Mayor of Nairobi, Multi-party democracy activism
- Awards: Honorary Doctor of Letters (Murang'a University of Technology, 2018)

Charles Wanyoike Rubia (1923 – 23 December 2019) was the mayor of Nairobi from 1962 to 1967, the first native African to hold the post. He later joined Parliament, where he rose to the cabinet. In 1990, together with Hon. Kenneth Matiba, Rubia led the calls for multi-party democracy and was subsequently detained twice by President Daniel arap Moi. He was later released from detention after one year, and had been in poor health ever since.

He became Mayor of Nairobi in July 1962. He was re-elected to the position in October 1963, and July 1964. In September 1964, Rubia briefly resigned as mayor before returning to the position.

He was an MP from Starehe Constituency in Nairobi from 1969 to 1988.

In July 2018, Murang'a University of Technology honoured the past Mayor of Nairobi with a Doctor of letters degree for his good work in mobilizing the community in the establishment of Murang'a college of Technology.

He died on 23 December 2019, aged 96, in his Karen home, in Nairobi.
