= Ernest Albert Vasey =

British colonial politician & actor (1901-1984)

Sir Ernest Albert Vasey CMG KBE
- Born: Ernest Albert Whitmee; 27 August 1901; Maryport, Cumberland, England
- Died: 10 January 1984 (aged 82); Nairobi, Kenya
- Spouses: Norah May (m. 1923) Hannah Strauss (m. 1944; died 1981)

Sir Ernest Albert Vasey CMG KBE (27 August 1901 – 10 January 1984) was a British colonial politician and actor.

== Early life ==
Vasey was born Ernest Albert Whitmee in Maryport, Cumberland, England to the actors Grace Whitmee (née Childs) and Ernest Albert Whitmee. He spent much of his early life touring the country with his mother and attending various elementary schools until the age of twelve. After leaving school at twelve, he supported himself through acting and other means, until he settled in Shrewsbury in 1922, married, and began taking part in local politics.

== Political career ==
In 1928, he became chairman of the Shrewsbury Junior Imperial League, and was elected to the local council as an independent conservative. His colonial career began in 1935 when he holidayed to Kenya and decided to move there (in 1936).

== Kenya ==
Vasey initially found work as a cinema manager, but soon got involved in local politics; being elected to Nairobi Municipal Council for the Westland's Ward in 1938. He later rose to Mayor of Nairobi, serving between 1941-1942 and 1944-1946. Vasey married again in 1944 (it isn't clear what happened to his first wife). He was awarded a Companion of the Order of St Michael and St George (CMG) in 1945.
