= 1950 Nairobi general strike =

Nine-day general strike in Kenya

The 1950 Nairobi general strike was a nine-day general strike led by the East African Trades Union Congress (EAUTC) that took place in Nairobi, Kenya, in the spring of 1950.

On 15 May 1950, union leaders Makhan Singh and Fred Kubai, under charges of being officers of an unregistered trade union whose registration had been refused, as per section 8 and 10 of the Trades Unions and Trades Disputes Ordinance, 1943. After the arrests, police cordoned off the EAUTC offices, blocking the EAUTC central council from having access to it.

In response, the remaining EAUTC leadership announced their intentions to start a general strike at 14:00 the next day. By the end of the day, however, so many people had already walked out that the strike was already underway. The strikers demanded the release of Kubai and Singh, an end to workers being arrested in their homes in the middle of the night, the setting of a legal minimum wage, various employee benefits such as sick leave, and the changes to taxi driver municipal by-laws.

Located between Nairobi's industrial area and the city's railway station, Kaloleni Valley became one of the epicentres of the strike, with multiple demonstrations being held there and a large bonfire being lit to symbolise the continuation of the strike. Strikebreakers had their heads shaved in the Valley and were forced to clean the local toilets. Local women played a significant role in the organisation of the strike and in maintaining supply lines.

The colonial government reacted strongly, quickly declaring the strike illegal under the Essential Services Ordinance and sending vans with loudspeakers around the city to broadcast the government's position. The government also attempted to break the strike by sending in armoured cars, firing tear gas at demonstrations, and making hundreds of arrests. The Kenya Police Reserve and the Criminal Investigation Department conducted surveillance and infiltration of the strike, with snatch squads being assigned to kidnap union leaders.

By June 1950, the strike had come to an end.

== Sources ==
- David Hyde, "The Nairobi General Strike [1950]: from Protest to Insurgency", in The Urban Experience in Eastern Africa [A. Burton editor], the British Institute in Eastern Africa, 2002. ISBN 1-872566-26-X.
