= Electoral Commission of Kenya =

Electoral Commission of Kenya refers to the now defunct commission that was disbanded by the 10th Parliament in 2008 and replaced with the Interim Independent Electoral Commission of Kenya. Samuel Kivuitu the last Chairman of the Commission and the commissioners at the time of disbanding, in November, 2008, moved to court to contest the disbanding of the Commission. They claim that the disbanding was unconstitutional as a tribunal should have been set up to investigate the wrongdoing on their part in the 2007 Presidential election. The following hearing for the suit occurred 3 February 2010 at the Constitutional Court. It was replaced by the Independent Electoral and Boundaries Commission (IEBC). Its first set of commissioners was appointed in November 2011, led by its first chairperson, Issack Hassan.

== See also ==
- Constitution of Kenya
- 10th Kenyan Parliament
- Kenyan presidential election, 2007
- Kriegler Commission
