= Kennedy Kiliku =

Kenyan politician

Kennedy Kiliku (died 20 May 2010) was a Kenyan politician. Until his death, Kiliku was chairman of National Labour Party (NLP). He was also the Changamwe MP from 1983 to 1997 and an articulate debater and critic of the Government.

== Death ==
Kiliku died at a hospital after collapsing at his home in Mombasa. According to his wife, he had been complaining of chest pains before he was rushed to the hospital.
