= Ferdinand Waititu =

Kenyan politician

Ferdinard Ndūng'ū Waititū aka Baba Yao

Assistant Minister for Water and Irrigation
- In office 2010 – 27 September 2012
- President: Mwai Kibaki
- Prime Minister: Raila Odinga
- Minister: Charity Ngilu

Governor of Kiambu County
- In office 22 August 2017 – 19 Dec 2019
- Preceded by: William Kabogo
- Succeeded by: Dr James Nyoro

Member of Parliament
- In office May 2015 – 8 August 2017
- Preceded by: George Muchai
- Constituency: Kabete Constituency

Member of Parliament
- In office 2008–2013
- Preceded by: Mugabe Were
- Succeeded by: (constituency abolished)
- Constituency: Embakasi Constituency

Councilor, Nairobi City Council
- In office 2003–2007

Personal details
- Born: 1 January 1962 (age 64) Kibera, Nairobi
- Spouse: Susan Ndūng'ū
- Children: 3
- Education: Ruriru High school; Dagoretti High School
- Alma mater: Technical University of Kenya; Panjab University; Kenya Methodist University
- Nickname: Baba Yao

Ferdinard Ndūng'ū Waititū, popularly known as Baba Yao, is a Kenyan politician who served as the second governor of Kiambu County from 2017 until his impeachment in January 2020.He previously served as the member of parliament for Embakasi Constituency from 2008 to 2013 and for Kabete Constituency from 2015 to 2017. He also served as an assistant minister for Water Services and Irrigation in the Kibaki administration.

Waititū entered Parliament in 2008 as the representative for Embakasi, a position he held until 2013. After unsuccessfully contesting the Nairobi gubernatorial election in 2013, he was elected member of parliament for Kabete in a May 2015 by-election following the death of the constituency's incumbent representative, George Muchai. He held the seat until 2017, when he was elected governor of Kiambu County on a Jubilee Party ticket, defeating the incumbent governor, William Gitau.

On 29 January 2020, Waititū was impeached by the Senate of Kenya following proceedings involving allegations of corruption and abuse of office. He subsequently faced criminal proceedings relating to county government procurement and public funds and was sentenced to 12 years' imprisonment, with an alternative fine, in a corruption case involving the Kiambu County government.

== Early Life and Education ==
Waititū completed his secondary school in 1981 from Dagoretti High School, where he obtained the Kenya Certificate of Education. He then proceeded to Rūirū High school for form 1~2 he did a junior secondary exam before proceeding to Dagoretti High for Form 3-4 then he proceeded to Technical University of Kenya, formerly known as the Kenya Polytechnic, before proceeding to Delhi, India, where he obtained a degree in commerce from Sri Guru Gobind Singh College of Commerce in 1991.

== Political Career ==
=== 2013 General Elections ===
Waititū contested the Nairobi gubernatorial election in the March 2013 general election but lost to Evans Kidero. He returned to Parliament on 4 May 2015, when he won the Kabete Constituency seat in a by-election held following the death of the incumbent MP, George Muchai, who was murdered in Nairobi in February 2015.

=== Kiambu County Governor ===
In 2017, Waititū declared to run for the governor of Kiambu County under Jubilee Party. In the nominations held on 25 April, he beat the incumbent governor, William Kabogo, to become Jubilee's party flag bearer.In the elections held in August 2017, he emerged as the winner and was declared the next Governor of Kiambu. His reign was, however, short-lived. In January 2020, a motion to impeach him was tabled in the Senate, accusing him of abuse of office, awarding tenders to get kickbacks, and irregularly awarding tenders to himself and his wife, among others. He pleaded not guilty, but on 30 January 2020, the Senate found him guilty and voted to kick him out. His deputy governor, James Nyoro, succeeded him to become the third governor. He appealed the Senate's decision in the high court, which also found him guilty and upheld the ruling to kick him out.

==== Imprisonment ====
In February 2025, Ferdinand Waititū was convicted on corruption charges and sentenced to 12 years in prison or a fine of Sh53.7 million. He was found guilty of receiving Sh25.6 million in kickbacks related to a Sh588 million road tender scandal during his tenure as governor. Waititū, along with his wife Wangari Ndūng'ū, former Kiambu County Roads Chief Officer Eng. Luka Mwangi Wahinya, and businessman Charles Mbuthia Cege, was implicated in a fraudulent tender scheme involving upgrading roads in Kiambu County. The Ethics and Anti-Corruption Commission (EACC) initiated investigations in 2019 following a tip-off about irregularities in the awarding of the tender. The investigation uncovered conflict of interest, fraud, and money laundering. In addition to his criminal conviction, the High Court froze Waititū's assets worth Sh1.9 billion on allegations they were acquired through public funds.
