= Susan Mboya =

Kenyan businesswoman (born 1965)

Dr Susan Mboya
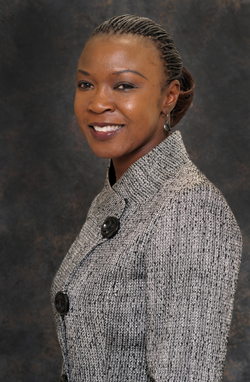
- Susan Mboya in 2014
- Born: Susan Mboya; 1965 (age 60–61); Kenya
- Education: BPharm; MSc; PhD
- Alma mater: Kenya High School; University of Connecticut; Massachusetts College of Pharmacy and Health Sciences
- Occupations: Principal and International Advisor
- Organization: Zawadi Africa Education Fund
- Spouse: Evans Kidero (m. 2011)
- Children: 3
- Parents: Tom Mboya; Pamela Mboya

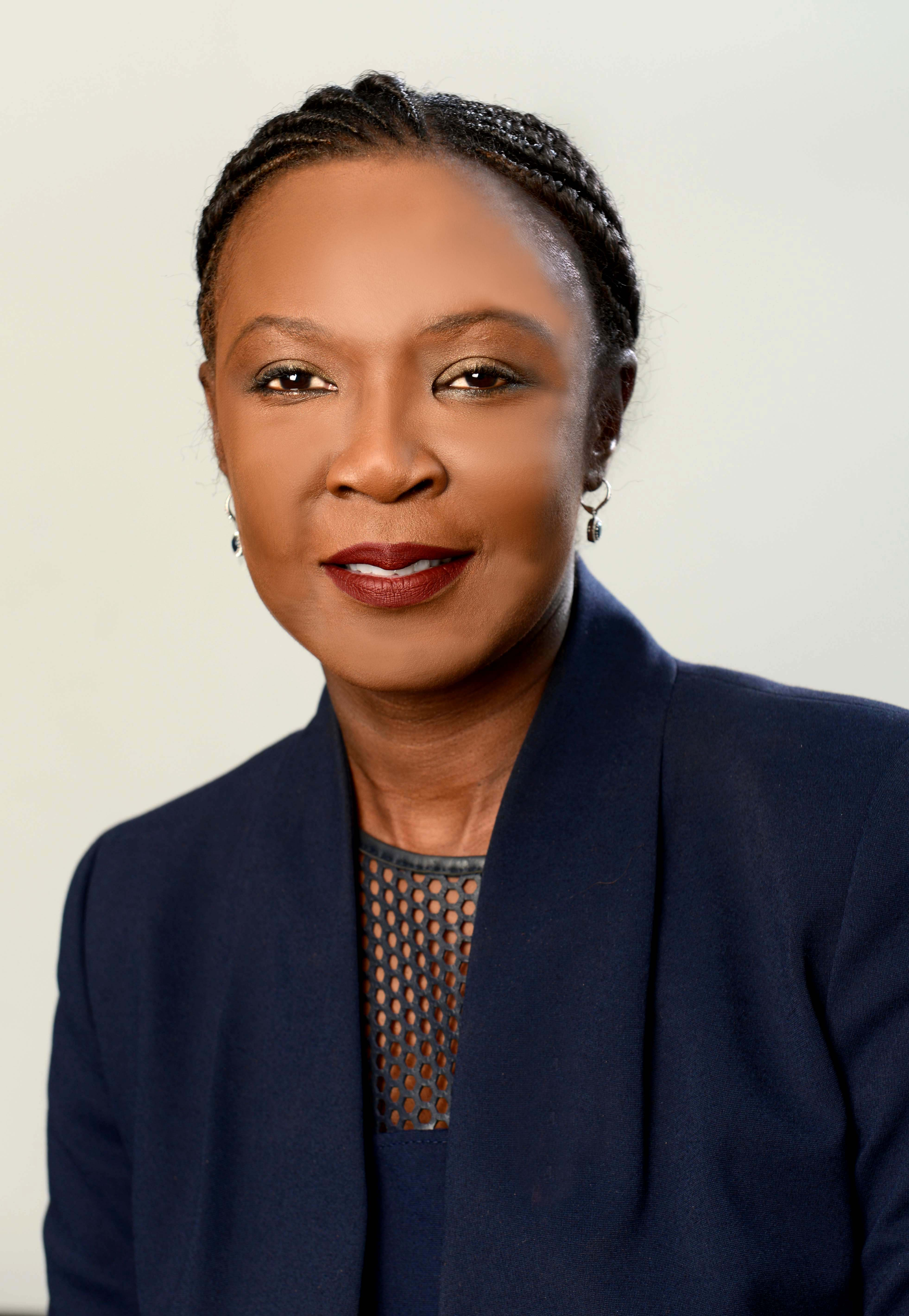
Susan Mboya official portrait August 2016

Susan Mboya is a corporate executive, entrepreneur and philanthropist who is the principal and international advisor for Navigators Global, a Washington, DC–based consulting firm. Mboya is the founder/owner of a number of businesses in the hospitality and entertainment sector.

== Career ==
Mboya has been a corporate executive for over 25 years and has held a number of senior executive positions at global multinational firms, including being the Global Director for Oral B Oral Care at Procter and Gamble for five years and being the General Manager of Coca-Cola South Africa from 2008 to 2011. She is the immediate former president of the Coca-Cola Africa Foundation and the group director of the Eurasia Africa Group (EAG) for women’s economic empowerment at Coca-Cola and is the daughter of the late Tom Mboya, a Kenyan nationalist leader and one of the founding fathers of the Republic of Kenya and the late Pamela Mboya, a renowned diplomat who was Kenya’s representative to UN Habitat. Tom Mboya was a well-known trade unionist, educationist, Pan-Africanist, author, and Cabinet Minister in Kenya's first post-independence government. She is also the former First Lady of Nairobi County, Kenya's largest county and the capital city and economic center of Kenya. Mboya holds a number of board positions, including the chair of Liberty Group, a publicly traded company in the Nairobi Stock Exchange. Mboya is the founder of the Zawadi Africa Educational Fund, a 501(c)(3) non-profit organization that provides scholarships and leadership development training to academically gifted, marginalized African girls to enable them to attend top colleges and universities around the world with the objective of creating a pipeline of African female leaders. The Zawadi Africa program is based on the Africa Student Airlifts program launched by her father and President John F. Kennedy in 1959 that enabled several participants, including Barack Obama Sr, father of President Barack Obama, and Professor Wangari Mathaai to study in the U.S.

Mboya has been a senior executive on the global stage for over 25 years, holding a series of positions in general management. She started as a brand manager at Procter and Gamble in Cincinnati, Ohio, and became an associate director and then a director working in the paper division and in the oral care division. Mboya moved to the Coca-Cola Company as the General Manager for the Southern Africa region in 2008 and then became the President of the Coca-Cola Africa Foundation, where she successfully forged public-private partnerships to help resource, fund, and provide technical expertise for the foundation's initiatives, raising over $120 million in funding towards the 5by20 initiative and working with international partners including USAID, "GETF," DFID, TechnoServe, MercyCorps, and the International Finance Corporation and empowering over 700,000 women.

== Zawadi Africa ==
Mboya is the founder and president of the Zawadi Africa Educational Fund, a non-profit organization modeled on her father's student airlifts of the 1960s, which took over 800 East African students to American universities and colleges.

== Nairobi County First Lady ==
In her role as the first First Lady of Nairobi County, Mboya initiated and championed programs supporting children's education and welfare, women and girls' empowerment, women's health, and the environment.

== Achievements and awards ==
Mboya was inducted into the American Advertising Federation (AAF) Hall of Achievement in 2003 and was awarded African American Marketer of the Year by Ebony magazine in 2004. In June 2009, Mboya was awarded an honorary doctorate in humanities by Lakeland University and was the commencement speaker at Meredith College in 2016 in recognition of her humanitarian activities with the Zawadi Africa Education Fund. In 2016, the University of Massachusetts (UMASS) in Boston awarded Mboya an honorary doctorate for her work with the Zawadi Africa Education Fund and with women’s economic empowerment and philanthropy in Africa.
