= Kenya Law Reform Commission =

Kenyan government commission

The Kenya Law Reform Commission is a government Commission established to keep under review all the law of Kenya in order to ensure its systematic development and reform.

== Roles ==
The commission's roles include:

- Initiate or receive and consider any proposals for the reform of the law that may be made or referred to it;
- Co-ordinate with the Attorney-General in preparing, for tabling in Parliament, the legislation required to implement the Constitution;
- Formulate, by means of draft Bills or otherwise, any proposals for reform.
- Undertake the examination of particular branches of the law and formulate proposals for their reform;
- Prepare comprehensive programmes for the consolidation of the law;
- Draw the attention of the Minister to any proposal for reform if, in the opinion of the Commission, such proposal has or is likely to have an adverse effect on the country as a whole or on any community or section of the country in particular;
- Provide advice and information to national and county governments ministries, departments and agencies or any other person or authority with regard to the reform or amendment of a branch of the law appropriate to the ministry, department and agency or person or authority;
- Solicit for funds for participation by the public in the performance of the functions of the Commission;
- Encourage international co-operation in the performance of its functions;
- Encourage and promote public participation in the process of law-making and educate and sensitize the public on the content of the law through seminars, workshops, conferences and other public meetings; and

== Membership ==
The current membership of the Commission is as follows:

- Kathurima M'Inoti - Chairman
- Nancy Baraza - Vice Chairperson (until June 2011)
- Mbage N. Njuguna
- Desterio Oyatsi
- Benjamin M. Musau
- Jane Mwangi
- Hassan Lakicha
- Joash Dache - Secretary
