= George Muchai =

Kenyan politician (1955/6 – 2015)

George Muchai (1955/6 – 7 February 2015) was a Kenyan politician and trade unionist. He served as a member of the National Assembly for Kabete Constituency following the 2013 elections. He was a member of the Jubilee Alliance.

In October 2011 Muchai survived an attempt on his life.

== Death ==
On 7 February 2015 Muchai was returning from a family dinner when his car was rammed in Nairobi. Several armed persons emerged from the other car and Muchai was shot and killed together with his two bodyguards and driver. A briefcase and two pistols of the bodyguards were stolen. One suspect in the murder was arrested on 11 February.

=== Murder and robbery trial ===
Seven suspects were put on trial in 2015. In January 2020 the trial was still ongoing. In September 2025 the High Court ruled that four of the suspects would go to trial for the murder charges while three others would not go to trial due to a lack of evidence. On 13 March 2026, Erick Munyera alias Chairman, Raphael Kimani, Mustafa Kimani alias Musti, Stephen Asitiva, Jane Wanjiru, Margaret Njeri and Simon Wambugu were found guilty by magistrate Lucas Onyina of murdering him and his bodyguards. Erick Munyera, Raphael Kimani, Mustafa Kimani and Stephen were found guilty of robbery with violence, illegal firearms possession and handling stolen property. Jane Wanjiru and Margaret Njeri were also found guilty of separate accounts of illegal firearms and ammunition possession. In the nearly 10 year trial, the court heard from 37 witnesses. The lawyers and convicts tendered their final submissions before sentencing on 18 March 2026. The six convicts were sentenced on 9 April, four to death and two to 10 years in prison. The four are Erick Munyera, Raphael Kimani, Mustafa Kimani and Stephen Asitiva with time spent in custody during trial was also taken into account and execution of sentences on the other counts was held in abeyance, as the death sentence on count one rendered the remaining sentences legally redundant. The two sentenced to 10 years' imprisonment each are Jane Wanjiru and Margaret Njeri.
