= Kriegler Commission =

Kenyan inquiry international commission

The Kriegler Commission, officially The Independent Review Commission (IREC), was an international commission of inquiry established by the Government of Kenya in February 2008 to Inquire into all aspects of the 2007 General elections with particular emphasis on the presidential elections.

== Background ==
The commission carried out its mandate in the aftermath of the 2007–2008 Kenyan crisis.

== Terms of Reference ==
The terms of reference were as follows:

- To Analyze the constitutional and legal framework and identify weaknesses and inconsistencies in the electoral laws;
- To Examine the organizational structure, composition and management system of the ECK;
- To Examine public participation in the 2007 electoral processes;
- To Investigate the organization and conduct of the 2007 electoral operations including civic and voter education among others;
- To Investigate vote counting and tallying at all levels: and
- To assess the functional efficiency of ECK to discharge its mandate.

== Members ==
A former South African judge Justice Johann Kriegler was appointed to lead a panel of experts investigating Kenya's disputed 2007 presidential elections. The members of the team were:

- Judge Johann Kriegler (chairman).
- Lady Justice Imani Daudi Aboud
- Prof. Marangu M’Marete
- Mr. Francis Angila Aywa
- Ms Catherine Muyeka Mumma
- Horacio Boneo.

== Report ==
The commission found that there were too many electoral malpractices from several regions perpetrated by all the contesting parties to conclusively establish which candidate won the December 2007 Presidential elections. Such malpractices included widespread bribery, vote buying, intimidation and ballot stuffing by both sides, as well as incompetence from the Electoral Commission of Kenya (ECK), which was shortly thereafter disbanded by the new Parliament.

== Cost ==
In response to a query by Joseph Lekuton, on 16 December 2008, Orwa Ojode the Assistant Minister for Provincial Administration and Internal Security confirmed to parliament that the commission had cost Kshs 49,448,459 with the Kenya Government contributing Kshs 48,136,789 and donors contributing Kshs 1,311,470.

== See also ==
- Ethnic Conflicts in Kenya
