= William Gitau =

Kenyan politician

William Kabogo Gitaū
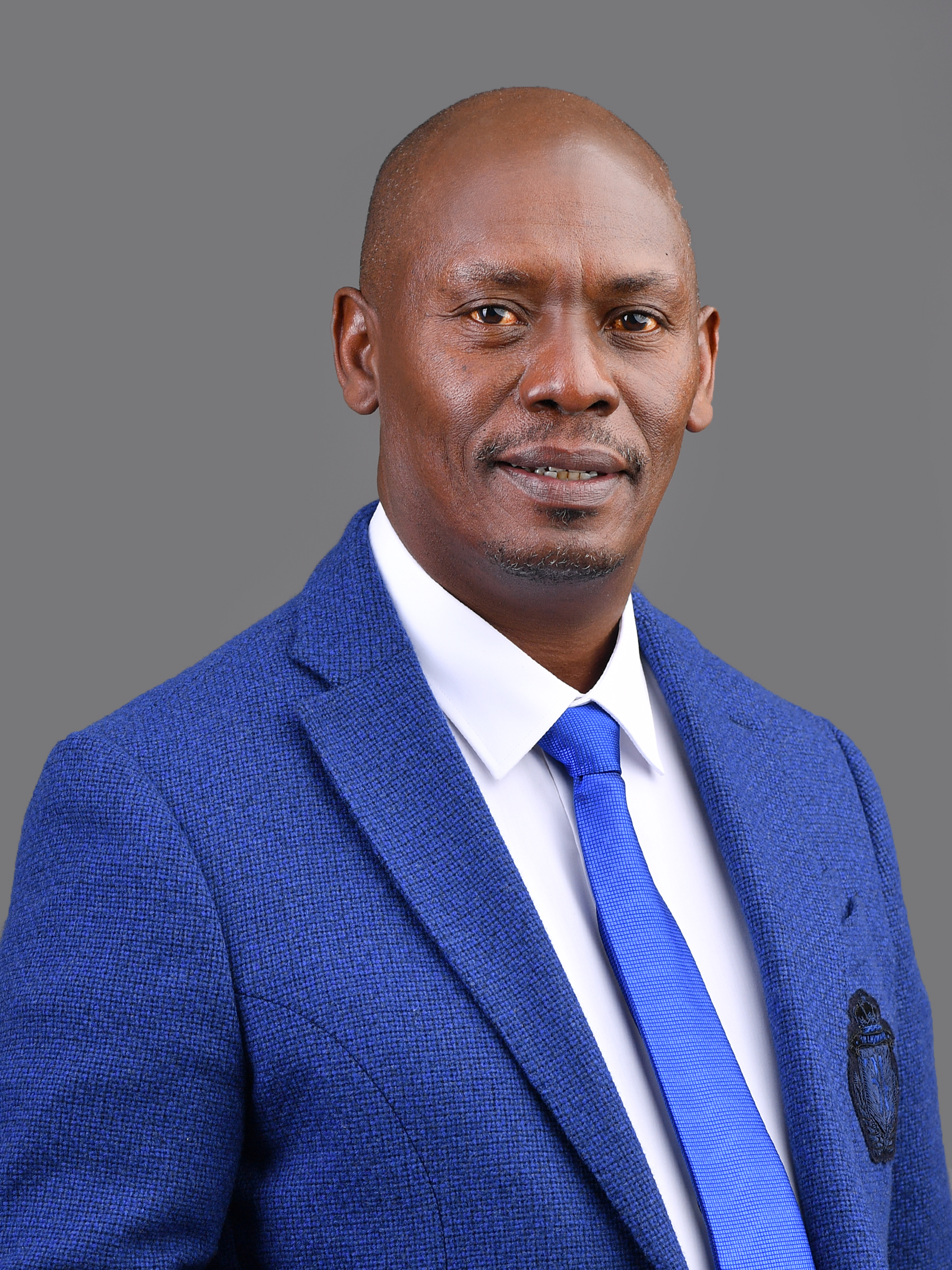

Cabinet Secretary, Ministry of Information, Communications & The Digital Economy
- Incumbent
- Assumed office 17 Jan 2025
- President: William Ruto
- Preceded by: Eliud Owalo

First Governor of Kiambu County
- In office 27 March 2013 – 2017
- Succeeded by: Ferdinand Waititu

Member of the Kenyan Parliament
- In office 2002 -2007 2010 – 2013
- Constituency: Juja

Personal details
- Born: 4 April 1961 (age 65) Komothai village in Githunguri Constituency
- Party: Tujibebe Wakenya Party
- Spouse: Philomena Kabogo
- Education: University of the Punjab
- Occupation: Politician

William Kabogo Gitaū is Cabinet Secretary of the Ministry of Information, Communications & The Digital Economy in the Republic of Kenya. He is also party leader of Tujibebe Wakenya Party. He previously served as the First Governor of Kiambu County, a position he won in the 2013 Kenyan general election.

Prior to becoming Governor, he served as the Member of Parliament for Juja Constituency, a seat he first secured in 2002 and then regained in the 2010 by-election after a successful court petition. In that election, he defeated George Thuo of the PNU, who came in a distant second, while the previous MP, Stephen Ndichū finished in third place.

In 2017 Kenyan general election, William Kabogo Gitaū was defeated by Ferdinand Waititu in the Jubilee Party's gubernatorial nominations. Following this setback, he left the Jubilee Party and announced his intention to contest the governorship as an independent candidate. Ferdinand Waititū ultimately won the election.

== Early life and education ==
William Kabogo was born on 4 April 1961, in Komothai village, Githūngūri Constituency. He attended St. George's Rūirū Primary School and then continued his studies at Thika Technical School from 1975 to 1978. Afterward, he pursued a Bachelor of Commerce degree at Punjab University in India.

== Political career ==
=== Juja Member of Parliament ===
William Kabogo burst onto the political scene in 2002 when he sought the Kanu ticket for the Juja Parliamentary Seat, then held by incumbent Stephen Ndichū, who was running under Kanu’s presidential candidate, Uhuru Kenyatta. Although Kabogo lost that election, he quickly switched to the lesser-known Sisi Kwa Sisi party and defeated Ndichū in the general elections.

However, Kabogo faced a setback in 2007 when he lost his seat to George Thuo. Determined to reclaim his position, he successfully petitioned the election results, leading to a by-election where he triumphed over Thuo with a landslide victory on a Narc-Kenya ticket.

==== Potential misinformation on social media platforms ====
In May 2021, a false statement circulated on social media claiming that William Kabogo had conceded defeat in the parliamentary by-election for the Juja constituency. PesaCheck, East Africa’s first public fact-checking initiative, in collaboration with Code for Africa—the continent’s largest civic technology and data journalism accelerator—investigated the claim. Their analysis concluded that the statement was indeed fake.

=== Kiambu Governor ===
In 2013, Kabogo contested and won the Kiambu Gubernatorial Elections, making him the first Governor of Kiambu County. However, his fortunes changed in 2017 when he lost the governorship to Ferdinand Waititū after failing to secure the crucial Jubilee Party ticket, which was considered essential for success in Kiambu County, the political stronghold of Uhuru Kenyatta. In hindsight, his attempt to run as an independent candidate proved to be a challenging and ultimately futile endeavor.

=== Kenyan Cabinet ===
On 19 December 2024, President William Ruto nominated former Kiambu Governor William Kabogo to head the Ministry of Information, Communications, and the Digital Economy. Kabogo appeared before the National Assembly for vetting on 14 January 2025. He was sworn in at State House Nairobi on Friday, 17 January 2025, and officially assumed office.

== Controversies ==
=== Drug Baron Allegations ===
During the 10th Parliament of Kenya, George Saitoti presented a dossier to parliament received from US embassy naming kabogo as a kenyan based drug baron among 4 other members of parliament. Saitoti then Internal Security Minister asked the house to grant him 2 months to complete investigations into the allegations about Kabogo's links to Narcotics trade.

=== Mercy Keino Assault ===
In June 2011, Kabogo was reported to physically assault Mercy Keino during a party in Westlands. According to the Daily Nation, Kabogo slapped her severally and stepped on her joints after she annoyed Kabogo by shouting, moving around and breaking glasses during the party. Mercy was found dead the following morning along Waiyaki Way.

=== Land grabbing ===
==== Tatu City Land Controversy ====
In June 2021, Daily Nation reported Kabogo to be involved in a blackmail scheme against Tatu City investors by holding onto 5 land title deeds in order to coerce the investors into issuing him 5% stake in the development. Kabogo has since filed two lawsuits against Tatu city and affiliated companies asserting he was granted the title deeds following an agreement to purchase additional land after he made a 10% deposit for their purchase.

==== Westlands ====
In January 2019, a nairobi high court ordered Kabogo to pay a private company damages of Ksh 100m for land grabbing and trespass of a 5.2 acre property in Westlands. According to the court, Kabogo was involved in a land grabbing scheme that saw Kabogo illegally occupy the disputed property for over 10 years using a fake title deed thereby denying the private company rightful occupation of the disputed property.

==== Runda ====
In December 2017, Kabogo was reportedly accused of grabbing a runda property from his uncle. According to the daily nation, his uncle claimed that in 2016 kabogo fraudulently dispossessed him of property and evicted him along with his siblings from the disputed property.In 2018, a court ruled in favor of kabogo on account of lack of a formal contract between him and his relatives. It was reported that kabogo's uncle used the disputed properties for collateral for loans taken from Ncba and Icdc. When his uncle defaulted on the loans Kabogo offset the outstanding loans on the disputed land then proceeded to build houses on the property and proceeded to sell the houses on the disputed property without compensating his uncle for his share on the properties.
