= Starehe Constituency =

Electoral constituency in Kenya

Starehe
- constituency for the Parliament of Kenya
- Starehe Constituency within Nairobi City County

- Nairobi City County within Kenya
- County: Nairobi City
- Population: 210,423
- Area: 21 km^{2} (8.1 sq mi)

Current constituency
- Created: 1966
- Number of members: One
- Party: Jubilee Party
- Member: Amos Mwago
- Created from: Nairobi Central

Starehe is an electoral constituency in Kenya. It is one of seventeen constituencies in Nairobi City County, consisting of central and central to north areas of Nairobi. The constituency was established for the 1966 elections, with an area of 20 km^{2} (7.7 sq mi). It borders Westlands Constituency to the north; Mathare Constituency to the northeast; Kamukunji and Makadara constituencies to the east; Embakasi South Constituency to the south; Dagoretti North, Kibra and Lang'ata constituencies to the west.

== Members of Parliament ==
Elections	MP	Party	Notes
1966	Clement Lubembe	KANU	One-party system
1969	Charles Rubia	KANU	One-party system
1974	Charles Rubia	KANU	One-party system
1979	Charles Rubia	KANU	One-party system
1983	Charles Rubia	KANU	One-party system.
1988	Kiruhi Kimondo	KANU	One-party system. Kimondo was dismissed by KANU in 1989.
1989	Gerishon Kirima	KANU	By-elections. One-party system.
1992	Kiruhi Kimondo	FORD-Asili	Kimondo defected to KANU in 1989 resulting in by-elections.
1994	Stephen Mwangi	FORD-Asili	By-elections
1997	Maina Kamanda	Democratic Party	
2002	Maina Kamanda	NARC	
2007	Margaret Wanjiru	ODM	Vote recount held in 2010 indicated that the poll was won by Maina Kamanda (PNU). As a result, a by-election was ordered to take place. Wanjiru won in the by-election.
2013	Maina Kamanda	Jubilee	
2017	Charles Njagua	Jubilee	
2022	Amos Mwago	Jubilee	

== Electoral wards ==
Following the 2013 election, Starehe six electoral wards are Nairobi Central, Ngara, Pangani, Landimawe, South B and Ziwani/ Kariokor.

== Starehe Sub-county ==
The Sub-county partly shares the same boundaries with Starehe Constituency. The sub-county is headquartered at Kariokor and headed by a Deputy County Commissioner, working under the Ministry of Interior.
