= George Thuo =

Kenyan politician

Member of Parliament for Juja Constituency
- In office 2007–2010
- Preceded by: William Kabogo Gitau
- Succeeded by: William Kabogo Gitau

Personal details
- Born: February 14, 1967 Kenya
- Died: November 17, 2013 (aged 46) Thika, Kiambu County, Kenya
- Party: Party of National Unity
- Spouse: Judy Thuo
- Children: 3
- Occupation: Politician, Businessman
- Known for: Chief Whip of the ruling PNU party

George Thuo (14 February 1967 – 17 November 2013) was a Kenyan politician and businessman. A member of the Party of National Unity (PNU), he was elected to the National Assembly of Kenya in the 2007 Kenyan parliamentary election to represent Juja Constituency. He served as the PNU's chief whip in Parliament.

In April 2010, the High Court nullified his election over irregularities in the 2007 poll, resulting in a by-election held on 20 September 2010. Thuo finished third, behind William Kabogo Gitau of NARC-Kenya and Alice Wambui of the Kenya National Congress.

Before entering politics, Thuo worked as an accountant and held management positions at Kenya Bus Services and Trendsetters, a tyre company. He also founded City Hopper Ltd, a Nairobi-based transport company.

== Death ==
He died on 17 November 2013 at Porkies Pub in Thika town, Kiambu county, Kenya. According to several news sources, he collapsed while having drinks with friends.
