= Geoffrey Majiwa =

Geoffrey Majiwa is a former mayor of Nairobi.

He represents the Orange Democratic Movement (ODM). He is also the Baba Dogo ward Civic Councillor. On August 3, 2009 he retained his mayoral seat beating Mutunga Mutungi of the Party of National Unity in a Nairobi City Council poll. Before joining politics, he had worked as a court clerk.

He stepped aside on October 26, 2010 after being charged for his alleged involvement in a cemetery land corruption scandal.
