= Makadara Constituency =

Kenyan electoral constituency

Makadara
- constituency for the Parliament of Kenya
- Makadara Constituency within Nairobi City County

- Nairobi City County within Kenya
- County: Nairobi City
- Population: 189,536
- Area: 12 km^{2} (4.6 sq mi)

Current constituency
- Created: 1963
- Number of members: 1
- Party: ODM
- Member of Parliament: George Aladwa
- Wards: 4

Makadara Constituency is an electoral constituency in Nairobi City County, Kenya. It is one of the seventeen constituencies in the county. It was renamed prior to the 1997 elections, but was also known as Nairobi Doonholm Constituency for the 1963 elections, then as Bahati Constituency from 1966 to 1997. It consists of some central and southern of central areas of Nairobi County. The entire constituency is located within Nairobi City County, and has an area of 13 km^{2}. The current constituency boundaries were revised prior to the 2013 elections. It has a population of 189,536 people from the 2019 census report.

Mwai Kibaki, who later became the president of Kenya, served as a Makadara MP before moving to Othaya Constituency. The constituency was also represented by Gideon Kioko Mbuvi who was elected in a by-election in 2010, replacing Dickson Wathika, whose election in 2007 was invalidated due to 'election irregularities'. Sonko went on to become the senator for Nairobi County in 2013, and is currently the Governor of Nairobi County which is also the Capital of Kenya.

== Members of Parliament ==
Elections	MP	Party	Notes
1963	Mwai Kibaki	KANU	
1969	Mwai Kibaki	KANU	One-party system
1974	James Muriuki	KANU	One-party system.
1979	Fredrick Esau Omido	KANU	One-party system
1983	Fredrick Esau Omido	KANU	One-party system.
1988	Fredrick Esau Omido	KANU	One-party system.
1992	John Mutere	FORD-Asili	
1997	Paul Mugeke	Democratic Party	
2002	Reuben Ndolo	NARC	
2007	Dickson Wathika	PNU	Election invalidated in April 2010 due to electoral irregularities
2010	Gidion Mbuvi Kioko	NARC-Kenya	By-election (September 20, 2010)
2013	Benson Kangara	TNA	
2017	George Aladwa	ODM	-
2022	George Aladwa	ODM	

== County Assembly wards ==
Location	Area	Population*
Maringo/Hamza	2.9	52,293
Viwandani	5.7	44,881
Harambee	2.6	32,238
Makongeni	1.8	31,022
Total	13.0	160,434
1999 census.

== Makadara Sub-county ==
The Sub-county shares the same boundaries as the constituency. The sub-county is headquartered in Makadara. It is headed by a Deputy County Commissioner, working under the Ministry of Interior and National Administration.
