= Mike Sonko =

Kenyan politician

Mike Mbuvi Sonko
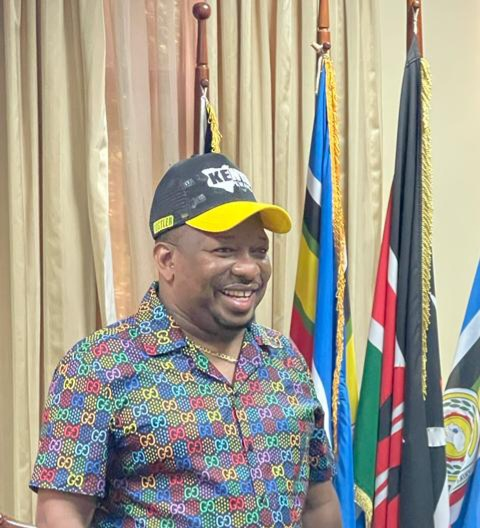
- Sonko in 2023

Governor of Nairobi City County
- In office 21 August 2017 – 17 December 2020 (impeachment)
- Preceded by: Evans Kidero
- Succeeded by: Speaker Benson Mutura (acting)

Senator of Nairobi City County
- In office 2013–2017
- Preceded by: Inaugural officeholder
- Succeeded by: Sakaja Johnson

Member of the Kenyan Parliament
- In office 2010–2013
- Preceded by: Dick Wathika
- Succeeded by: Benson Kangara
- Constituency: Makadara

Personal details
- Born: Mbuvi Gideon Kioko; 27 February 1975 (age 51) Mombasa
- Party: Jubilee Party of Kenya
- Education: Kenya Methodist University
- Occupation: Businessman, Politician
- Website: www.sonko.co.ke

Mbuvi Gideon Kioko, popularly known as Mike Sonko or simply Sonko (Sheng for "rich person" or "boss", pronounced as "Sonk/koh" ), (born 27 February 1975) is a Kenyan politician who served as the second Governor of Nairobi County. He was removed from the office of the governor by a form of impeachment by the Senate of the Republic of Kenya on Abuse of Office, Gross Misconduct and Crimes under National Law on 17 December 2020.

== Early life and education ==
Mike Mbuvi Sonko was born in Mombasa in 1975. His father, Mzee Kivanguli was Kamba from Mua Hills Machakos County. He attended Kikowani Primary School before proceeding to Kwale High School.

== Political career ==
=== Member of Parliament ===
Mike Sonko rose to national political prominence when he was elected as a Member of Parliament for Makadara Constituency, Kenya at the age of 35. The September 20, 2010 by-election was occasioned by a successful petition by Reuben Ndolo.

==== Remarkable event(s) ====
After the Westgate shopping mall attack in September 2013, Sonko claimed that he had warned the security services of a possible attack three months prior to the incident.

=== Senate of Kenya ===
After the inauguration of the new constitution of Kenya in 2010 and the creation of the county governments, Sonko announced his intention to run for Senator in Nairobi County. He became the First Senator of Nairobi after garnering 808,705 votes, beating his closest competitor, Margaret Wanjiru of ODM, who had garnered 525,822 votes, in the Nairobi senatorial election of 2013. Unlike his time in parliament, where he gained notoriety for flouting House Rules, including incidences of inappropriate dressing, the Senator mostly dressed in official attire.

During his time in the Senate, he formed the Sonko Rescue Team, an officially registered Non-Governmental Organization that provided government-like services to residents of Nairobi slums. The then-governor of Nairobi County, Dr. Evans Kidero opposed the activities of the group, citing conflicts of interest with the county government's operations. The Senator acquiesced and donated the vehicles to the county government after several weeks of tense public exchanges.

=== Nairobi Governor ===
As early as January 2016, Mike Sonko had announced his intentions to run for Governor of Nairobi County in the 2017 Kenyan general election. After a grueling primary campaign against Peter Kenneth, Sonko ran for the Gubernatorial seat for Nairobi County under the Jubilee Party of Kenya and defeated the incumbent Evans Kidero to become the second Governor of Nairobi. On 17 December 2020, after undergoing an impeachment procedure by the Nairobi County Assembly, Sonko was impeached by the Nairobi Senate and removed from office. Four days after Sonko's removal, Nairobi County Assembly Speaker Benson Mutura was sworn in as acting Nairobi Governor for at least 60 days due to the lack of a deputy governor.

== Controversies ==
=== 1998 Prison Sentence and Escape ===
On 12 March 1998, Sonko was convicted in two separate cases for failure to appear in court. In one case he was fined KSh 200,000 or 6 months in prison; in the other case a fine of KSh 500,000 or 6 months. Because he didn't pay the fines, he was to serve prison time. These sentences were to run concurrently, giving a 12-month term, to be served at Shimo La Tewa Prison.

On 16 April 1998, Sonko reportedly served about one month of the sentence, then “mysteriously” left Shimo La Tewa. He was reported to have been admitted for treatment at Coast General Hospital, and from there is said to have escaped custody. The prisons authorities later said that he should be charged with escaping from prison and should serve his remaining sentence.

=== 2000 Re-arrest ===
On 15 November 2000, Sonko was reported to have been re-arrested when he was in Industrial Area Remand Prison on other matters. At that point, prison officials identified him as having the 1998 escape / Shimo La Tewa sentence pending. He was moved to Kamiti Maximum Security Prison, and then later to Shimo La Tewa to finish out or at least address the old sentence. In 2001, he filed an appeal arguing that he had already served the time or that the sentence was excessive, especially considering his medical conditions. He claimed HIV-positive, epileptic, tuberculosis and ulcers. On 12 February 2001, the high court reduced the sentence to the period already served, and he was released.

=== 2019 Buruburu Assault ===
In May 2019, Sonko was charged with forcibly and violently entering the property of a private company in buruburu. He was reported to have assaulted 9 individuals together with goons in the 2019 property raid. In March 2024 the case was withdrawn.

=== Corruption charges ===
==== 357 million graft case ====
On 6 December 2019, the Director of Public Prosecutions in Kenya issued an arrest warrant against Mike Sonko for various corruption charges during his tenure as a Governor of Nairobi County. He was arrested in Voi. After the arrest, he was detained at Kamiti Maximum Security Prison for a few days and released on December 11, 2019, by anti-corruption court for a bond of Sh30 million or a surety of the same amount or a cash bail of Sh15 million. As a condition for the release, he was barred from accessing office of Nairobi County governor until the case was determined. The Senate impeached him on 17 December 2020.

==== 24 million graft case ====
In December 2019, Sonko was accused of extortion of Ksh 10 million to facilitate payment to a software company while he was governor of Nairobi. He was charged with abuse of office and conflict of interest. In January 2025, a high court ruled that Sonko has a case to answer in the 24 million graft case. His acquittal in the case was set aside and a new trial ordered under another magistrate.

==== 20 million graft case ====
In January 2020, Sonko was charged with money laundering, conflict of interest, fraudulent acquisition of public property, and conspiracy to commit an offense of corruption. In December 2022, Sonko was acquitted by a magistrate's court due to defective charges. In December 2024, a high court overturned Sonko's acquittal in the matter due to reliance on an old charge sheet instead of an amended charge sheet.

=== US Travel ban ===
Due to involvement in corruption, the U.S. Department of State designated him and his wife Primrose Mwelu Nyamu Mbuvi; their daughters Saumu Agnes Mbuvi and Salma Wanjiru Mbuvi, and Sonko's minor child in March 2022 as ineligible for entry into the United States.

== Personal life ==
=== Recognition ===
In August 2019, Sonko was awarded an honorary degree of excellence from European Digital University (EDU) in recognition of his goodwill and contribution to the community.
