= Juja Constituency =

Kenyan electoral constituency

Juja
- constituency for the Parliament of Kenya
- Juja Constituency within Kiambu County

- Kiambu County within Kenya
- County: Kiambu
- Population: 300,948
- Area: 342 km^{2} (132.0 sq mi)

Current constituency
- Number of members: 1
- Party: UDA
- Member of Parliament: George Koimburi Ndungu
- Created from: Thika–Gatundu
- Wards: 5

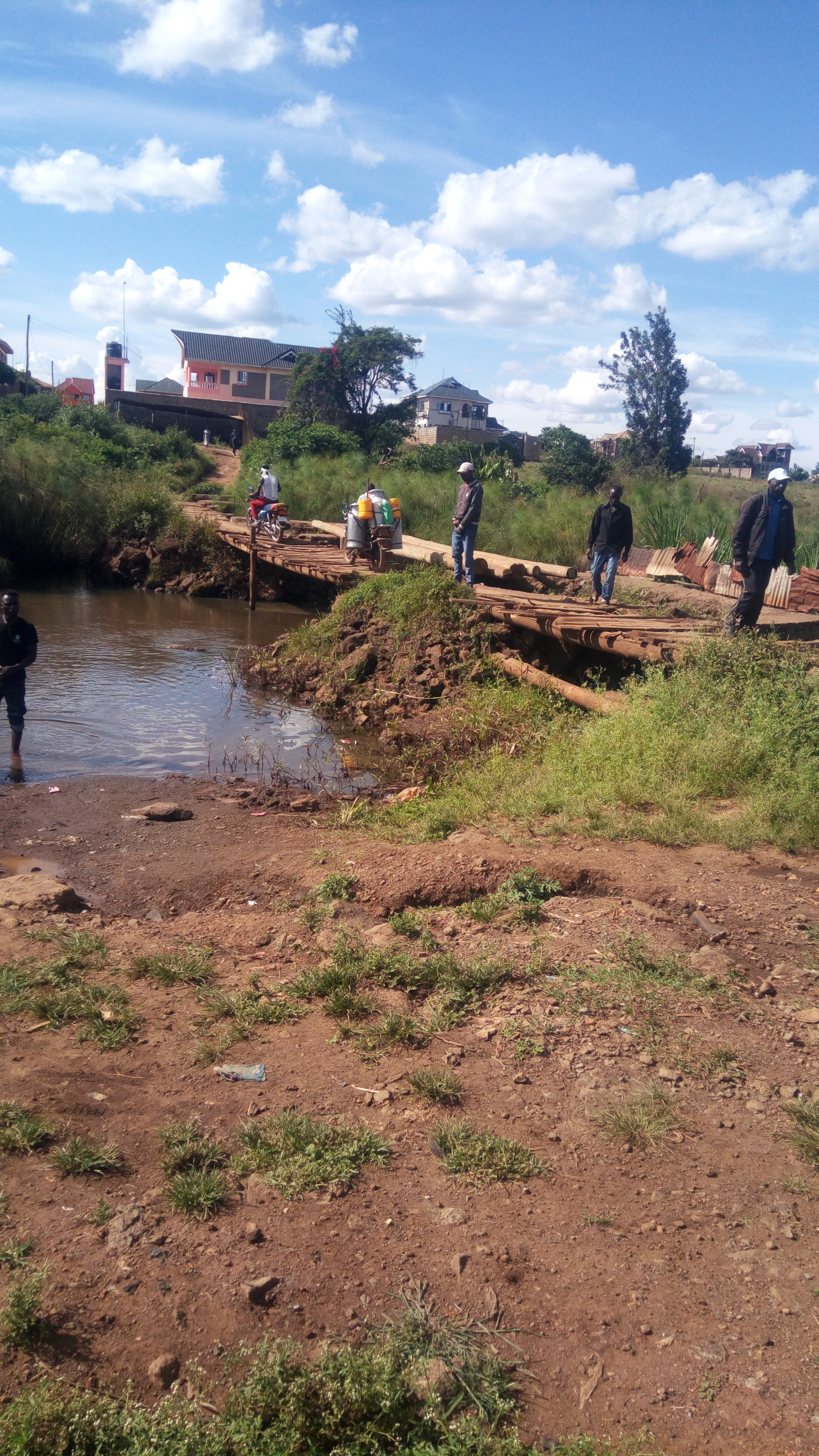
Landscape in Juja Constituency

Juja is an electoral constituency in Kenya. It is one of twelve constituencies in Kiambu County, one of four in the former Thika District. The constituency was established for the 1969 elections.

Before the 2013 elections, the constituency was broken into Juja, Ruiru and Thika Town constituencies. The current MP is Hon. George Koimburi who won a by-election in 2021.This followed the death of Hon. Francis Munyua Waititu of Jubilee Party who had been first elected in 2013 and re-elected in 2017. It has a population of 300,948 people (2019 census).

It is home to the main campus of Jomo Kenyatta University of Agriculture and Technology (JKUAT).

== Members of Parliament ==
Elections	MP	Party	Notes
1969	Gitu Kahengeri	KANU	Unopposed
1974	Peter Kenyatta Muigai	KANU	One-party system
1979	Gitu Kahengeri	KANU	One-party system
1983	George Kamau Muhoho	KANU	One-party system
1988	George Kamau Muhoho	KANU	One-party system
1992	Stephen Rugendo Ndicho	Ford-Asili	Multi-party system
1997	Stephen Rugendo Ndicho	SDP	Multi-party system
2002	William Kabogo Gitau	Sisi kwa Sisi	Multi-party system
2007	George Thuo	PNU	Election disputed by William Kabogo, seat declared vacant on 16 April 2010 due to election irregularities
2010	William Kabogo Gitau	NARC-Kenya	By-election
2013	Munyua Waititu (Wakapee)	TNA	Multi-party system
2017	Munyua Waititu (Wakapee)	JP	Multi-party system
2021	George Koimburi	PEP	By-election
2022	George Koimburi	UDA	Multi-party system

== Locations and wards ==
The electoral wards in this constituency are Juja, Kalimoni, Witeithie, Murera and Theta.
