= Margaret Wanjiru =

Kenyan politician

Bishop Margaret Wanjirū

Member of the National Assembly for Starehe Constituency
- In office 2007–2013
- Preceded by: Maina Kamanda
- Succeeded by: Maina Kamanda

Assistant Minister for Housing
- In office 2010–2013

Personal details
- Born: Margaret Wanjirū
- Party: Jubilee Party (formerly Orange Democratic Movement)
- Children: 3, including Stephen Kariuki
- Occupation: Politician, Bishop

== Margaret Wanjiru ==
Margaret Wanjiru is a Kenyan politician, televangelist and a Bishop. She is the founder and presiding bishop of Jesus Is Alive Ministries (JIAM), a Pentecostal church based in Nairobi, Kenya. She served as the Member of Parliament for Starehe Constituency from 2007 to 2013 and was Assistant Minister for Housing in the Government of Kenya between 2008 and 2013. Wanjiru is recognized due to her dual leadership in both religious and political spheres and as one of the female Pentecostal leaders in Kenya.

== Career and Political life ==
Wanjirū is also popularly known as 'Mama Na Kazi'. She belongs to the Jubilee Party after leaving the ODM party and was elected to represent the Starehe Constituency in the National Assembly of Kenya in the 2007 Kenyan parliamentary election. In 2010-2013, she was appointed into the cabinet as an Assistant Minister for Housing.

She risked losing her parliamentary seat after a 2010 vote recount indicated that her opponent, Maina Kamanda (PNU), had won the election by a clear margin. As a result, a by-election was held on September 20, 2010, in which Wanjirū retained the seat, defeating Kamanda.

== Personal life ==
She has three children: Stephen Kariūki (a politician who has served as a Kenyan member of parliament representing Mathare constituency ), Evans Kariūki, and Purity Kariūki. She was diagnosed with COVID-19 on May 21, 2020, which led to her admission to the ICU at Nairobi Hospital.
