= Dick Wathika =

Kenyan politician

Dick Mwangi Wathika

Mayor of Nairobi
- In office July 2004 – 2007
- Preceded by: Joe Aketch
- Succeeded by: Geoffrey Majiwa

Member of Parliament for Makadara Constituency
- In office 2007 – 30 April 2010
- Preceded by: Reuben Ndolo
- Succeeded by: Gideon Mbuvi Kioko

Personal details
- Born: October 20, 1973 Kenya
- Died: December 19, 2015 (aged 42) Kenya
- Party: Party of National Unity (PNU)
- Occupation: Politician

Dick Mwangi Wathika (20 October 1973 – 19 December 2015) was a Kenyan politician who served as mayor of Nairobi. He was elected in July 2004, and was re-elected in 2006.

He vied successfully for the Makadara Constituency parliamentary seat in the 2007 Kenyan parliamentary elections, on a Party of National Unity ticket.

Wathika's 2007 election to Nairobi's Makadara Constituency was annulled on 30 April 2010. The judgment was delivered by Lady Justice Kalpana Rawal, who said the electoral process was marred by irregularities. Lady Justice Rawal told a packed court that Mr Wathika was not validly elected, but said that she would issue a ruling in the afternoon on whether to stay the judgment before giving the parliamentary Speaker a certificate nullifying the MP's election.

The by-election was held on 20 September 2010. He failed to retain the seat, as the poll was won by Gideon Mbuvi Kioko of NARC-Kenya followed by Reuben Ndolo of ODM, while Wathika was left third.

Dick Wathika contested unsuccessfully the Mukurwe-ini Parliamentary Seat in the 2013 general elections. He died on 19 December 2015, cause undetermined, after having gone to the hospital.
