= List of years in Kenya =

History of Kenya

Portuguese colonization
Omani Arab colonisation
British rule
Kenyatta tenure
Moi regime

This is a list of years in Kenya.

== Before European colonization ==
- BCE in East Africa
- Early CE in East Africa
- 13th century
- 14th century

== Colonization ==
- 15th century
- 16th century
  - 1600s
  - 1610s
  - 1620s
  - 1630s
  - 1640s
  - 1650s
  - 1660s
  - 1670s
  - 1680s
  - 1690s
  - 1700s
  - 1710s
  - 1720s
  - 1730s
  - 1740s
  - 1750s
  - 1760s
  - 1770s
  - 1780s
  - 1790s
  - 1800s: 1800
  - 1801
  - 1802
  - 1803
  - 1804
  - 1805
  - 1806
  - 1807
  - 1808
  - 1809
  - 1810s: 1810
  - 1811
  - 1812
  - 1813
  - 1814
  - 1815
  - 1816
  - 1817
  - 1818
  - 1819
  - 1820s: 1820
  - 1821
  - 1822
  - 1823
  - 1824
  - 1825
  - 1826
  - 1827
  - 1828
  - 1829
  - 1830s: 1830
  - 1831
  - 1832
  - 1833
  - 1834
  - 1835
  - 1836
  - 1837
  - 1838
  - 1839
  - 1840s: 1840
  - 1841
  - 1842
  - 1843
  - 1844
  - 1845
  - 1846
  - 1847
  - 1848
  - 1849
  - 1850s: 1850
  - 1851
  - 1852
  - 1853
  - 1854
  - 1855
  - 1856
  - 1857
  - 1858
  - 1859
  - 1860s: 1860
  - 1861
  - 1862
  - 1863
  - 1864
  - 1865
  - 1866
  - 1867
  - 1868
  - 1869
  - 1870s: 1870
  - 1871
  - 1872
  - 1873
  - 1874
  - 1875
  - 1876
  - 1877
  - 1878
  - 1879
  - 1880s: 1880
  - 1881
  - 1882
  - 1883
  - 1884
  - 1885
  - 1886
  - 1887
  - 1888
  - 1889
  - 1890s: 1890
  - 1891
  - 1892
  - 1893
  - 1894
  - 1895
  - 1896
  - 1897
  - 1898
  - 1899
  - 1900s: 1900
  - 1901
  - 1902
  - 1903
  - 1904
  - 1905
  - 1906
  - 1907
  - 1908
  - 1909
  - 1910s: 1910
  - 1911
  - 1912
  - 1913
  - 1914
  - 1915
  - 1916
  - 1917
  - 1918
  - 1919
  - 1920s: 1920
  - 1921
  - 1922
  - 1923
  - 1924
  - 1925
  - 1926
  - 1927
  - 1928
  - 1929
  - 1930s: 1930
  - 1931
  - 1932
  - 1933
  - 1934
  - 1935
  - 1936
  - 1937
  - 1938
  - 1939
  - 1940s: 1940
  - 1941
  - 1942
  - 1943
  - 1944
  - 1945
  - 1946
  - 1947
  - 1948
  - 1949
  - 1950s: 1950
  - 1951
  - 1952
  - 1953
  - 1954
  - 1955
  - 1956
  - 1957
  - 1958
  - 1959
  - 1960s: 1960
  - 1961
  - 1962
  - 1963

== Republic of Kenya ==
  - 1960s: 1964
  - 1965
  - 1966
  - 1967
  - 1968
  - 1969
  - 1970s: 1970
  - 1971
  - 1972
  - 1973
  - 1974
  - 1975
  - 1976
  - 1977
  - 1978
  - 1979
  - 1980s: 1980
  - 1981
  - 1982
  - 1983
  - 1984
  - 1985
  - 1986
  - 1987
  - 1988
  - 1989
  - 1990s: 1990
  - 1991
  - 1992
  - 1993
  - 1994
  - 1995
  - 1996
  - 1997
  - 1998
  - 1999
  - 2000s: 2000
  - 2001
  - 2002
  - 2003
  - 2004
  - 2005
  - 2006
  - 2007
  - 2008
  - 2009
  - 2010s: 2010
  - 2011
  - 2012
  - 2013
  - 2014
  - 2015
  - 2016
  - 2017
  - 2018
  - 2019
  - 2020s: 2020
  - 2021
  - 2022
  - 2023
  - 2024
  - 2025
  - 2026
  - 2027
  - 2028
  - 2029

== See also ==
- Timeline of Kenya
- Timelines of cities in Kenya: Mombasa, Nairobi
