= 2025 in Kenya =

- Decades: 2000s; 2010s; 2020s
- See also: Other events of 2025; Timeline of Kenyan history

Events in the year 2025 in Kenya.

== Incumbents ==
- President: William Ruto
- Deputy President: Kithure Kindiki
- Chief Justice: Martha Koome

== Events ==
=== January ===
- 3 January – A shuttle collides with a lorry in Uasin Gishu County, killing 10 people.
- 10 January – A light aircraft crashes into a highway in Malindi, Kilifi County, killing three people on the ground.
- 17 January – Cooper Motor Corporation announces its plan to wind down and shutdown its businesses in Kenya, Uganda and Tanzania.

=== February ===
- 23 February – At least 20 people are reported missing following cross-border clashes involving members of the Turkana people and the Daasanach people in Turkana County, along the Omo River forming the border with Ethiopia.

=== March ===
- 3 March – At least four people are shot and injured by police during protests by refugees against food rationing at Kakuma Refugee Camp.
- 7 March – The ruling United Democratic Alliance of President William Ruto signs an agreement with the opposition Orange Democratic Movement of Raila Odinga that will see both parties involved in critical government policy making.
- 10 March – President Ruto donates 20 million shillings to a Nairobi church, sparking protests over high living costs, tax hikes, and political influence.
- 14 March –
  - The Sudanese government orders a ban on imports from Kenya, citing national security concerns amid criticism over the latter's hosting of the Rapid Support Forces.
  - A trailer collides with a shuttle in Migaa, killing 14 people.
- 23 March – Six police reservists are killed in a cross-border attack on their camp by Somali Al-Shabaab terrorists in Garissa County.
- 26 March – Kenya formally recognizes Kosovo as an independent sovereign state.

=== April ===
- 5 April – Three vehicles collide along the Kericho-Kaplong road in Bomet County, killing 15 people and injuring 14 others.
- 21 April – Police raid Melkio Saint Joseph Missions of Messiah Church in Migori County, rescuing 57 worshippers and uncovering two bodies buried within the compound.
- 30 April – Orange Democratic Movement MP Charles Ong'ondo is shot dead inside his car at a traffic stop in Nairobi.

=== May ===
- 22 May –
  - A court in Nairobi convicts Hussein Mohamed Abdille Ali and Mohamed Abdi Ali of helping facilitate the Nairobi DusitD2 complex attack in 2019. They are sentenced to 30 years' imprisonment on 19 June.
  - A Catholic priest, Alloyce Cheruiyot Bett, was shot at the end of the Mass he was celebrating at a church in Kenya.
- 25 May – MP George Koimburi is abducted by unknown men after a church service in Juja Constituency, Kiambu County. He is found beaten the next day.

=== June ===
- 8 June – The United Kingdom announces the arrest of one of its soldiers on suspicion of raping a person in Nanyuki.
- 9 June – A tour bus falls off a cliff in Gichakha, Nyandarua County, killing six people and injuring 20 others.
- 10 June – The European Union adds Kenya to its list of high risk jurisdictions for money laundering and terrorism financing.
- 14 June – A Grob G 120 of the Kenya Air Force crashes in Kwale County, killing its two pilots.
- 16 June – Eliud Langat resigns as Deputy Inspector General of the Kenya Police following protests over the death of blogger Albert Ojwang in police custody on charges of defaming Langat.
- 17 June – One person is killed in an attack by motorcycled assailants on demonstrators protesting against extrajudicial killings by police in Nairobi.
- 25 June – At least 16 people are killed during antigovernment protests on the anniversary of the 2024 Kenya Finance Bill protests.

=== July ===
- 7 July – At least 31 people are killed during antigovernment protests on the anniversary of the 1990 Saba Saba Day prodemocracy protests.
- 15 July – Three soldiers are killed by an IED while patrolling a road near the Somali border between Garissa County and Kiunga.
- 20 July – Activist Boniface Mwangi is arrested and charged with illegal ammunition possession; he is released on bail the next day.

=== August ===
- 7 August –
  - A light aircraft belonging to Charity Amref Flying Doctors crashes in Githurai, Nairobi, killing all four people on board and two others on the ground.
  - A bus owned by Kenya Pipeline collides on a level crossing with a train in Naivasha, Nakuru County, killing eight people.
- 8 August – A bus carrying mourners from a funeral falls into a ditch near Kisumu, killing at least 25 people.
- 15 August – Kenya appoints a consul-general for the M-23 held city of Goma in the Democratic Republic of Congo, prompting criticism from the Congolese government.
- 20 August – A judge orders the Kenyan government to protect the rights of transgender people in the country by passing a Transgender Protection Rights Act.
- 21 August – The bodies of at five suspected victims of the Shakahola Forest incident are discovered in a shallow grave in Malindi.
- 21 August – The United Kingdom agrees to pay compensation to 7,723 claimants affected by the 2021 Lolldaiga conservancy wildfire that was blamed on an incident during a training exercise by the British Armed Forces.

=== September ===
- 10 September – Senior lawyer Kyalo Mbobu is shot dead in a drive-by shooting in Nairobi.
- 15 September – The High Court orders the arrest of a British national over the 2012 murder of Agnes Wanjiru.
- 19 September – The government designates the Muslim Brotherhood and Hizb ut-Tahrir as terrorist organizations.
- 27 September – Police in Nairobi rescue 22 people from a trafficking ring allegedly sending recruits to fight for Russia against Ukraine.

=== October ===
- 13 October – A man is arrested outside State House, Nairobi after shooting dead a security officer using a bow and arrow at the residence's main gate.
- 16 October – Four people are killed in Nairobi when security forces fire shots and tear gas to disperse large crowds trying to view the remains of Raila Odinga at the Nyayo National Stadium.
- 25 October – The Kenyan Navy intercepts a ship carrying 1,024 kg (2,258 lb) of methamphetamine valued at $63 million off the coast of Mombasa and arrests six Iranian nationals on board.
- 28 October – Mombasa Air Safari Flight 203: A light aircraft operated by Mombasa Air Safari crashes in Kwale County, killing ten tourists from Hungary and Germany along with the Kenyan pilot.

=== November ===
- 1 November – At least 26 people are killed in a landslide in Chesongoch, Elgeyo Marakwet County.
- 8 November – Two Kenyan activists abducted in Uganda after attending a rally by opposition politician Bobi Wine on 1 October are released and repatriated after Ugandan President Yoweri Museveni announces that they had been arrested for plotting to overthrow him.
- 27 November – The High Court strikes down as unconstitutional provisions that allowed authorities to raid community seed banks and confiscate seeds following a lawsuit filed by a group of smallholding farmers.
- 30 November – Kenya formally exits the COMESA Sugar Safeguard regime after 24 years.

=== December ===
- 9 December – Queen Mary of Denmark arrives in Nairobi as part of a three-day official visit to Kenya.
- 11 December – The inaugural Kenya Junior School Education Assessment (KJSEA) results, under the new Competency-Based Education (CBE) 2-6-3-3 educational system are released by the Cabinet Secretary for Education, Julius Ogamba.
- 11 December – The Nairobi High Court suspends a $2.5 billion health cooperation agreement between the Kenyan government and the United Statesm citing concerns over the transfer of health and personal data.
- 15 December – The national cabinet approves the creation of an infrastructure fund and a sovereign wealth fund.
- 18 December – David Munyua becomes the first Kenyan to participate in and win a match at the PDC World Darts Championship.

== Art and entertainment ==
- List of Kenyan submissions for the Academy Award for Best International Feature Film

== Holidays ==
- 1 January – New Year's Day
- 31 March – Eid al-Fitr
- 18 April – Good Friday
- 21 April – Easter Monday
- 1 May – International Workers' Day
- 7 June – Eid al-Adha
- 10 October – Mazingira Day
- 20 October – Mashujaa Day
- 12 December – Jamhuri Day
- 25 December – Christmas Day
- 26 December – Boxing Day

== Deaths ==
- 30 April – Charles Ong'ondo Were, 51, MP.
- 28 May – Ngũgĩ wa Thiong'o, 90, author.
- 17 June – Gilbert Deya, 88, televangelist.
- 17 July – Phoebe Asiyo, 92, women's rights activist, MP (1980–1983, 1992–1997).
- 15 October – Raila Odinga, 80, prime minister (2008–2013), MP (1993–2013), and African Union High Representative for Infrastructure Development (2018–2023).
- 6 December – Denar Joseph Hamisi, 56, politician, MP
- 8 December – Iain Douglas-Hamilton, 83, zoologist
- 13 December – Cyrus Jirongo, 64, MP (1997–2002, 2007–2013)
- 17 December – Mohamed Khadhar Ibrahim, 69, justice of the Supreme Court (since 2012)
