= 2027 in Kenya =

- Decades: 2000s; 2010s; 2020s
- See also: Other events of 2027; Timeline of Kenyan history

2027 in Kenya details notable events that will occur, or are scheduled to take place, in Kenya in 2027.

== Incumbents ==
- President: William Ruto (UDA)
- Deputy President: Kithure Kindiki (UDA)
- Chief Justice: Martha Koome

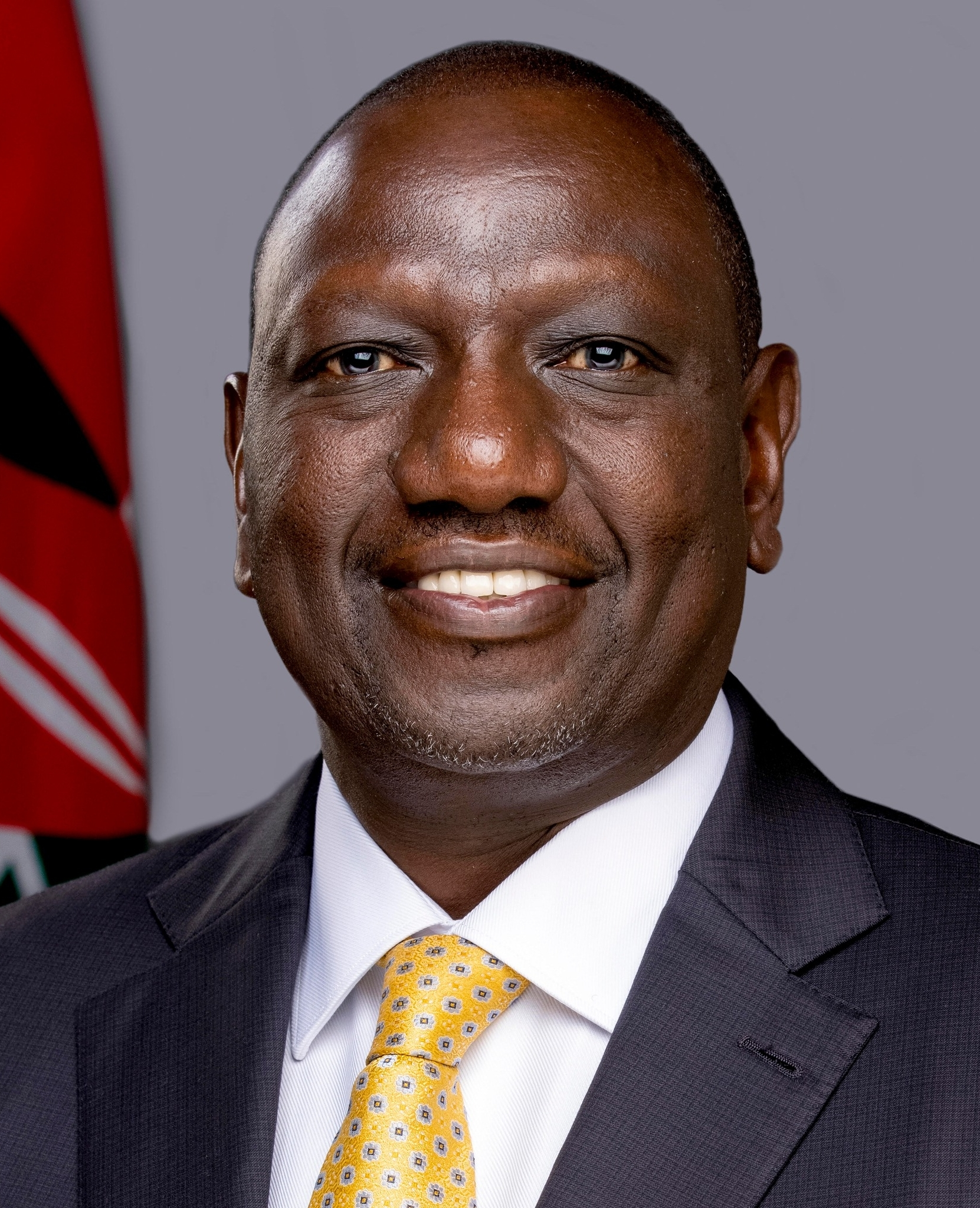
William Ruto

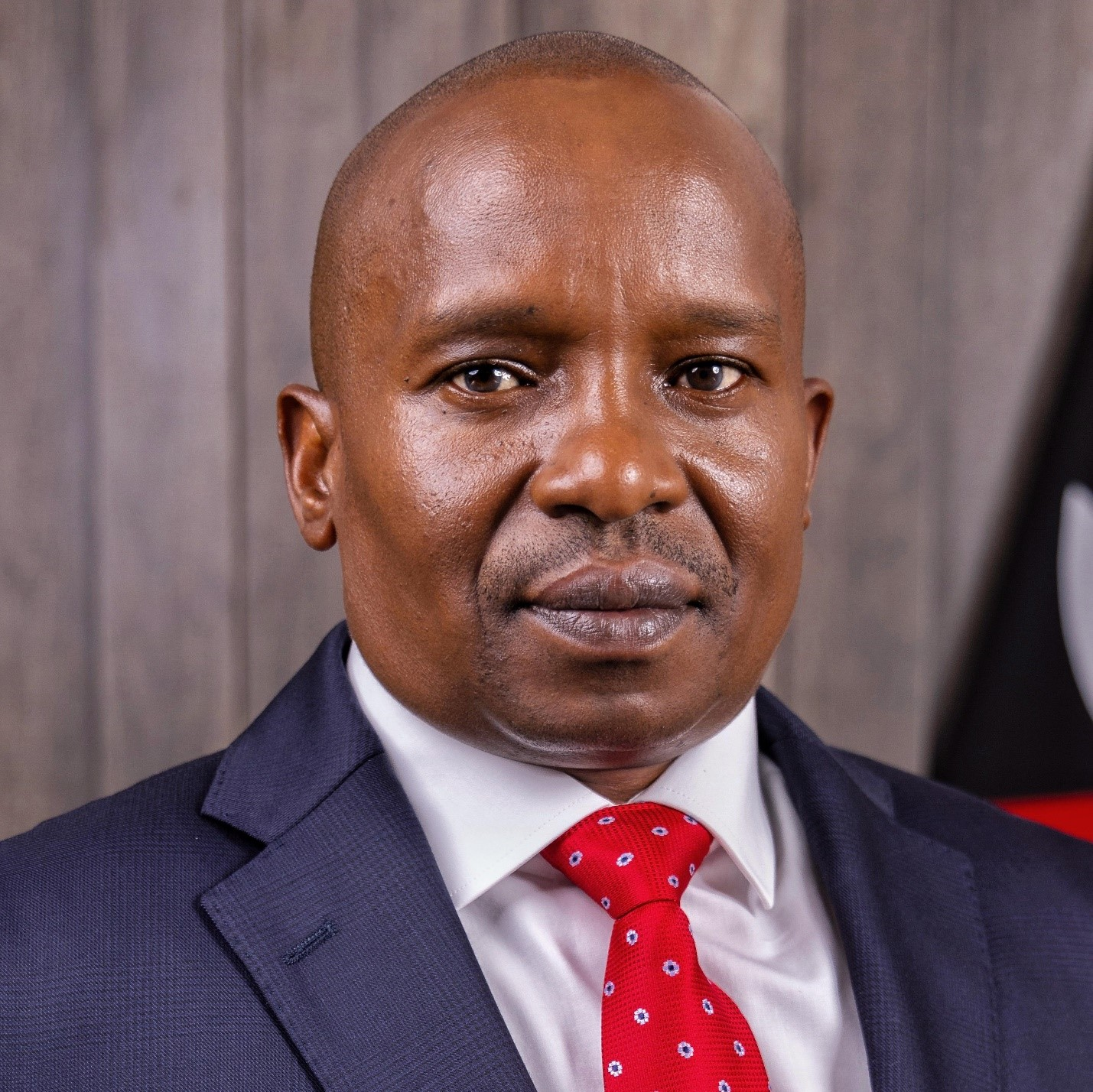
Kithure Kindiki

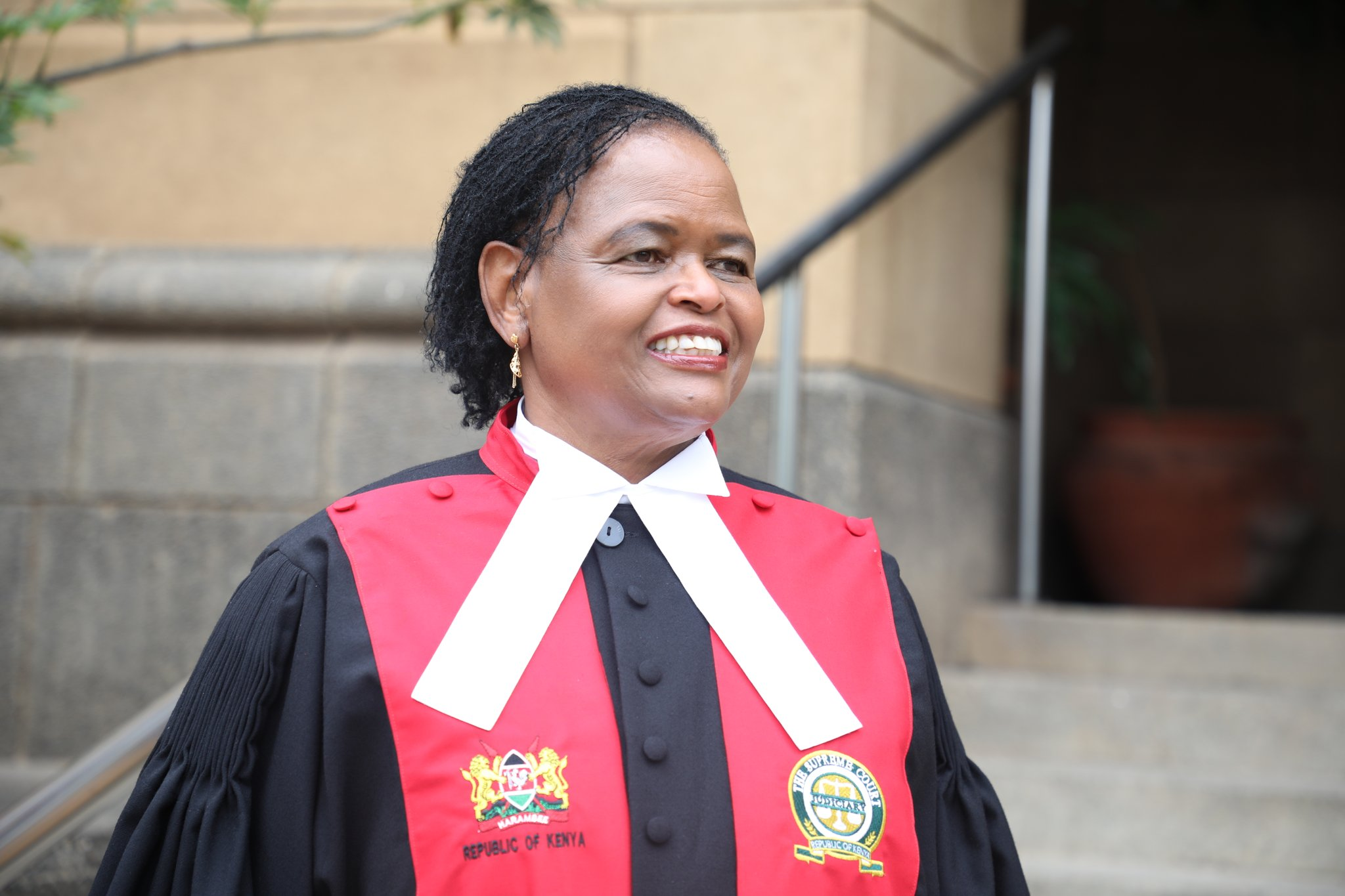
Martha Koome

== Events ==
=== April ===
- 14 – 15 April – Kenya will host the fourth Summit on Responsible Artificial Intelligence in the Military Domain.

=== June ===
- 19 June – The 2027 Africa Cup of Nations (AFCON 2027) football tournament is scheduled to begin. The event is co-hosted by Kenya, Uganda, and Tanzania under the joint East Africa "Pamoja" bid. This marks the first time in history the tournament is hosted by three countries.

=== July ===
- 17 July – The final match of the 2027 Africa Cup of Nations is scheduled to take place, concluding the 36th edition of the tournament.

=== August ===
- 10 August – The 2027 Kenyan general election is scheduled to take place to elect the President, National Assembly members, Senators and County Governors. Incumbent President William Ruto is eligible and expected to seek reelection for a second term.

=== November ===
- The last Kenya Certificate of Secondary Education exams will be taken.

=== Holidays ===
Sources:

- January 1 – New Year's Day
- March 26 – Good Friday
- March 29 – Easter Monday
- May 1 – Labour Day
- June 1– Madaraka Day
- October 10 – Mazingira Day (previously celebrated as Moi Day)
- 11 October – Day off for Mazingira Day
- 20 October – Mashujaa Day
- 12 December – Jamhuri Day
- 25 December – Christmas
- 26 December – Boxing Day

The Islamic holidays of Idd-ul-Fitr, the end of Ramadhan and Eid al-Adha are also observed as public holidays based on local moon sightings.

== See also ==
=== Country overviews ===
- History of Kenya
- Outline of Kenya
- Government of Kenya
- Politics of Kenya
- List of years in Kenya
- Timeline of Kenya
