= 2024 in Kenya =

- Decades: 2000s; 2010s; 2020s
- See also: Other events of 2024; Timeline of Kenyan history

2024 in Kenya details notable events that occurred in Kenya in 2024.

== Incumbents ==
- President: William Ruto
- Deputy President: Rigathi Gachagua (until 1 November); Kithure Kindiki (since 1 November)
- Chief Justice: Martha Koome

== Events ==
=== February ===
- 1 February – A gas truck explodes in a residential area of Nairobi, killing three people and injuring 297 others.

=== March ===
- March–May – 2024 Kenya floods: At least 238 people are killed nationwide in floods.
- 1 March – President William Ruto announces an agreement with Haiti to deploy 1,000 police officers in a mission approved by the United Nations to combat gang violence in the Caribbean nation.
- 5 March – A Cessna 172 on a training flight crashes into the Nairobi National Park after figuring in a mid-air collision with a Dash 8 passenger aircraft operated by Safarilink Aviation, killing all two people aboard the Cessna.
- 18 March – A bus carrying university students from Nairobi to Mombasa collides with a truck in Maungu, killing 11 and seriously injuring 42.
- 25 March – Four people, including three police officers, are killed in a bomb attack on a hotel near a police station in Mandera.

=== April ===
- 18 April – The Head of the Kenya Defence Forces, General Francis Omondi Ogolla, dies along with nine other military officers in a helicopter crash in Elgeyo Marakwet County.
- 29 April:
  - 2024 Mai Mahiu flash flood: At least 50 people are killed after a railway embankment collapses due to heavy rains near Mai Mahiu, Nakuru County.
  - Five people are killed in a bomb attack in El Wak, Mandera County.

=== May ===
- 23 May – A U.S. official announces President Joe Biden's intent to designate Kenya a Major non-NATO ally during President William Ruto's visit.
- 24 May – Five miners are killed after an illegal gold mine collapses in Dabel, Marsabit County.

=== June ===
- 7 June – Four construction workers are killed in a gun attack on a hospital site near the Dadaab refugee camp in Garissa County.
- 13 June – A judge is injured in a shooting inside a courtroom in Nairobi. The gunman, a disgruntled senior police commander, is shot dead by responding police.
- 18 June–ongoing – One person is killed while at least 200 others are injured and more than 200 are arrested during nationwide protests against proposed tax increases.
- 23 June – The Government of Kenya says it is ready for conversations with anti-finance bill protesters.
- 25 June –
  - 2024 Parliament of Kenya assault: The Parliament Buildings in Nairobi are set on fire during protests against the finance bill, while 10 protesters are shot dead by police.
  - Kenyan police units arrive in Haiti for a United Nations-backed security mission to restore order.
- 26 June – President Ruto declines to sign the controversial Kenya Finance Bill 2024 into law following the assault on parliament on 25 June.
- 27 June – Thousands of people protest in cities across Kenya, calling for the removal of President Ruto.

=== July ===
- 2 July – Protests against the controversial rejected Kenyan finance bill and President Ruto continue in major cities, with the Kenya National Commission on Human Rights reporting at least 39 people killed and 361 injured in the protests.
- 8 July – A Kenyan court rules that the 2022 killing of Pakistani journalist Arshad Sharif by police in Nairobi was unlawful and orders the Kenyan government to pay 10 million Kenyan shillings ($78,000) as compensation to his family.
- 11 July – President Ruto dismisses his cabinet, with only prime cabinet secretary and concurrent foreign minister Musalia Mudavadi and Deputy President Rigathi Gachagua ordered to remain in place.
- 12 July;
  - Japheth Koome Nchebere resigns as Inspector-general of Police and is replaced by his deputy, Douglas Kanja.
  - The bodies of six females are found in a quarry near the Mukuru kwa Njenga slum of Nairobi. The prime suspect is arrested and confesses to killing 42 women on 15 July. Another man is also arrested.
- 16 July – Clashes break out nationwide between Kenya Police and antigovernment protestors calling for the removal of President Ruto.
- 19 July – President Ruto reappoints six ministers whom he had dismissed on 11 July.
- 24 July – President Ruto appoints four members of the opposition Orange Democratic Movement to his cabinet.
- 26 July–11 August – Kenya at the 2024 Summer Olympics
- 31 July – Authorities declare an outbreak of mpox after a traveler transiting from Uganda to Rwanda tests positive for the disease at a border crossing in the south of the country.

=== August ===
- 20 August – Suspected serial killer Collins Jumaisi Khalusha, accused of murdering 42 women in July, escapes from police custody in Nairobi along with 12 Eritrean inmates.
- 28 August–8 September – Kenya at the 2024 Summer Paralympics

=== September ===
- 5 September –
  - Ugandan athlete Rebecca Cheptegei dies at a hospital in Eldoret after sustaining burns from a petrol attack by her partner in Endebess, Trans-Nzoia County almost a month after her participation in the women's marathon at the 2024 Summer Olympics. Her partner also dies from injuries sustained in the attack on 9 September.
  - At least 21 students are killed and 27 others are injured in a fire at a primary school in Nyeri County. Around 70 students are reported missing.
- 11 September – A strike is held by employees of Jomo Kenyatta International Airport in Nairobi against plans to lease the airport to the Adani Group of India. The agreement is subsequently cancelled by the Kenyan government in November.
- 13 September – Germany and Kenya agree on a labour migration deal which will see 250,000 skilled and semi-skilled Kenyan workers go work in Germany amid a shortage of skilled labour in the German economy. The agreement will also simplify the return of illegal migrants to Kenya.
- 21 September – President Ruto visits Haiti to inspect the Kenyan peacekeeping contingent.

=== October ===
- 1 October – An impeachment motion is introduced in Parliament against deputy president Rigathi Gachagua. The measure passes in the National Assembly on 8 October and is sent to the Senate.
- 9 October – Kenya is elected to a seat at the United Nations Human Rights Council for a three-year term beginning in 2025.
- 17 October – Following a majority vote by the Senate, Rigathi Gachagua is removed as Vice President after being convicted of five of the 11 charges laid against him during his impeachment.
- 18 October –
  - President Ruto appoints interior minister Kithure Kindiki as the new deputy president. However, his appointment is suspended that same day after the High Court orders a temporary halt to Rigathi Gachagua's removal pending an appeal.
  - A British national and six Turks are abducted in different locations in Nairobi. The Kenyan foreign ministry later says that four of those missing were Turkish refugees believed to be members of the Gülen movement who were repatriated at Ankara's request.

=== November ===
- 1 November – Kithure Kindiki is inaugurated as deputy president after a court upholds the impeachment of his predecessor Rigathi Gachagua.

=== December ===
- 4 December – Jackton Odhiambo is convicted for the 2023 murder of LGBT activist Edwin Chiloba in Eldoret. He is sentenced to 50 years imprisonment on 16 December.

== Art and entertainment ==
- List of Kenyan submissions for the Academy Award for Best International Feature Film

== Holidays ==
- 1 January - New Year's Day
- 29 March – Good Friday
- 1 April - Easter Monday
- 11 April – Eid al-Fitr
- 1 May - International Workers' Day
- 1 June - Madaraka Day
- 17 June – Eid al-Adha
- 10 October – Mazingira Day
- 20 October – Mashujaa Day
- 12 December – Jamhuri Day
- 25 December – Christmas Day
- 26 December – Boxing Day

== Deaths ==
- 11 February – Kelvin Kiptum, long-distance runner.
- 18 April – Francis Omondi Ogolla, 62, military general, Chief of Defence Forces.
- 5 September – Rebecca Cheptegei, marathon runner, murdered
- 4 October – Samson Kandie, marathon runner, murdered
- 6 October – Kipyegon Bett, long-distance runner.
- 7 October – Clement Kemboi, distance runner
- 17 October – Beatrice Nkatha, 66, politician, MP (2013–2022).
- 18 October – Zebedeo John Opore, politician, MP (1997–2007).
