= 2022 in Kenya =

- Decades: 2000s; 2010s; 2020s
- See also: Other events of 2022; Timeline of Kenyan history

Events of 2022 in Kenya.

== Incumbents ==
- President: Uhuru Kenyatta
- Deputy President: William Ruto

== Events ==
Ongoing – COVID-19 pandemic in Kenya

=== Predicted and scheduled events ===
- August 9 - 2022 Kenyan general election

== Deaths ==
=== January ===
- 2 January
  - Charles Njonjo, Attorney General of Kenya (1963–1979) (b. 1920).
  - Richard Leakey, Kenyan paleoanthropologist and conservationist (b. 1944).

=== April ===
- 21 April
  - Mwai Kibaki, 3rd President of Kenya (2002–2013) (b. 1931).

=== December ===
- 29 December, Catherine Kasavuli, journalist (b. 1962)

== Holidays ==
- 1 January – New Year's Day
- 1 May – International Workers' Day
- 10 October – Utamaduni Day
- 20 October – Mashujaa Day
- 12 December – Jamhuri Day
- 25 December – Christmas Day
- 26 December – Boxing Day

== See also ==
- COVID-19 pandemic in Africa
- 2020s
- African Union
- East African Community
- African Continental Free Trade Area
- Common Market for Eastern and Southern Africa
