= 2026 in Kenya =

- Decades: 2000s; 2010s; 2020s
- See also: Other events of 2026; Timeline of Kenyan history

The following is a list of events of the year 2026 in Kenya, as well as predicted and scheduled events that have not yet occurred.

== Incumbents ==
- President: William Ruto
- Deputy President: Kithure Kindiki
- Chief Justice: Martha Koome

== Events ==
=== January ===
- 2 January – A multi-storey building under construction collapses in Nairobi's South C area, trapping at least two people and causing fatalities.
- 3 January – President Ruto says the government will introduce new legislation making drug and illicit alcohol trafficking a capital offence.
- 26 January – Al-Shabaab terrorists kill a local chief and a teacher in Hulugho, Garissa County.
- 30 January – KOKO Networks announces its closure, citing the government's failure to authorize carbon credits and import permits for bioethanol made from molasses.

=== February ===
- 2 February – A Matatu strike paralyzes transport in Nairobi.
- 3 February – The Tax Appeals Tribunal rules that the Kenya Revenue Authority (KRA) is legally entitled to treat unexplained bank deposits and mobile money transfers, payments or deposits, such as those via M-pesa, as taxable income unless the taxpayer proves otherwise with documentary evidence.
- 3 February – Independent Electoral and Boundaries Commission CEO and Commission Secretary, Marjan Hussein Marjan resigns from office ahead of the 2027 General Elections.
- 4 February – President Ruto announces income tax exemptions for individuals earning KSh30,000 and below per month (approximately $233), and a 25% tax reduction for those earning up to KSh50,000 (about $388).
- 11 February – Orange Democratic Movement National Executive Committee (NEC) attempts to remove Edwin Sifuna as party Secretary-General.
- 16 February – A strike is held by workers at Jomo Kenyatta International Airport in Nairobi following a dispute over the implementation of a collective bargaining agreement.
- 17 February – The government unveils a national carbon registry.
- 26 February – Festus Omwamba is charged at the Kahawa Law Courts in Kiambu with human trafficking, after recruiting and sending Kenyan youths to fight for the Russian Armed Forces in the war with Ukraine.
- 27 February – United Democratic Alliance (Kenya) wins Isiolo South Constituency, Evurore ward and Muminji by-elections which were previously held by Jubilee, an independent and Devolution Empowerment Party (DUP) parties respectively.
- 28 February – Six people are killed when an Airbus Helicopters H175 crashes in Mosop Constituency, Nandi County. MP Johana Ng'eno is among the victims.

=== March ===
- 1 March – Alliance High School (Kenya) marks its centenary in a ceremony attended by President Ruto.
- 7 March – At least 45 people are killed in overnight flooding caused by heavy rains across the country with 23 in Nairobi alone.
- 10 March – A Chinese national is arrested at Jomo Kenyatta International Airport in Nairobi while attempting to leave Kenya with 2,238 live garden ants concealed in his luggage.
- 12–15 March – WRC Safari Rally Kenya, a round of the 2026 World Rally Championship.
- 13 March – A court in Nairobi convicts six people in a robbery with violence case linked to the 2015 killing of George Muchai and his bodyguards; one of the accused is acquitted due to insufficient evidence.
- 16 March – A building collapses during a botched demolition in Shauri Moyo, Nairobi, killing four people.
- 19 March – The government restarts the building of the China-backed Standard Gauge Railway extension, after a six-year construction pause.
- 22 March – A mass grave, discovered in Kericho town, containing 14 individuals buried on 19 March. It is believed to be part of a larger, illicit burial site containing roughly 70 bodies buried over several months without government or landowner permission.
- 28 March –
  - 2026 Kenya floods: At least 108 people are killed after multiple weeks of flooding across the country.
  - A truck and a minibus collide along the Nyeri-Nyahururu road in Nyeri County, killing 16 and injuring 10.
- 30 March – Albert Korir, winner of the 2021 New York City Marathon, is banned for five years by the Athletics Integrity Unit after admitting to the use of the banned substance EPO following an out-of-competition test.

=== April ===
- 2 April – Foreign Affairs Minister Musalia Mudavadi reports that 16 Kenyans are missing in Russia, after being recruited to fight for the Russian Armed Forces in Ukraine, while 38 others are currently hospitalized in Russia under restricted access.
- 11 – 15 April – Kenya hosts the inaugural 2026 FIFA Women’s Series.
- 20 April – John Korir wins the men’s race at the Boston Marathon for the second consecutive year, setting a new course record of 2:01:52.
- 26 April – Sabastian Sawe officially breaks the 2-hour barrier for a marathon at the 2026 London Marathon.
- 27 April – Final contingent of Kenyan police officers completely withdraw from Haiti ending the Multinational Security Support Mission.
- 27–29 April – World Health Summit Regional Meeting 2026, held at the United Nations Office at Nairobi (UNON).

=== May ===
- 1 May – China lifts tariffs on imports from Kenya until 2028.
- 11–12 May – Kenya hosts the first anglophone edition of the Africa Forward Summit.
- 18 May – Four people are killed, transportation paralyzed and more than 30 injured during nationwide protests and a public transport strike over sharp fuel price increases, linked to global supply pressures caused by the 2026 Iran war.
- 20 May – The High Court decriminalizes consensual under-age sexual relationships following a case involving the arrest of a 17-year old minor found living with his 16-year-old partner.
- 24 May – The Kenya Wildlife Marathon and Half-Marathon takes place.
- 25 May – Fuel price hike protests resume after a week's pause, leaving one person shot dead by the police in Nyeri.
- 28 May – Sixteen children are killed in a fire at a boarding school in Gilgil. Authorities subsequently arrest eight students on suspicion of involvement in the alleged arson attack.
- 29 May – The High Court suspends a US plan to establish a quarantine facility in Kenya for American citizens exposed abroad to ebolavirus.
- May – June – A wave of student unrest affects over 200 secondary schools, leading to temporary closures and property damage. One of the first affected schools was State House Girls which was closed on 12 May, other notable schools include, Lenana School, Alliance Boys High School, Mang'u High School, Upper Hill School, Utumishi Girls' Academy and Maranda High School.

=== June ===
- 1 June – Two people are shot dead during a protest in Nanyuki against a proposed United States-backed Ebola quarantine facility intended for asymptomatic Americans exposed to the virus.
- 2–5 June – 2026 Global Data Festival and Kenya Space Expo & Conference in Nairobi.
- 3 June – A nganya matatu performing a stunt at Industrial Area, Nairobi, overturns and kills five people, leaving 12 seriously injured.
- 5–12 June – Kenya hosts the World Rafting Championship at Sagana, Kirinyaga County.
- 8 June –
  - Former chief justice David Maraga is briefly arrested while participating in a protest against construction works inside Nairobi National Park.
  - A mass grave containing seven bodies is discovered along the Mwingi-Garissa Highway in Kitui County.
- 9 June – The Switzerland-based Legal Action Worldwide, representing victims of the Sudanese civil war (2023–present), files a complaint against the Rapid Support Forces in Kenya for war crimes, marking the first such legal action against the group outside Sudan.
- 15 June – The government announces compensation payments to 2,000 victims of human rights abuses related to protests.
- 16–18 June – The 11th Our Ocean Conference is held in Mombasa and Kilifi County.
- 22 June – The High Court finds Health Cabinet Secretary Aden Duale in contempt of court for failing to comply with orders halting construction of a U.S.-backed Ebola quarantine facility at Laikipia Air Base.
- 25 June –
  - 355 people are allegedly arbitrarily arrested in commemorative protests honouring those who died in the 2024 Kenya Finance Bill protests.
  - Former half marathon world record holder Kibiwott Kandie is banned by the Athletics Integrity Unit for seven years, after being found guilty of refusing to provide a doping sample and tampering with the doping control process.
- 27 June – Annual Lewa Safari Marathon organized by Tusk.
- 30 June –
  - The High Court orders the recomposition of President Ruto's Cabinet due to it breaking the two-thirds gender rule.
  - One person is killed while two others are injured by gunfire in Mathare during demonstrations demanding the release of allegedly abducted protesters demanding justice for those killed and injured during the 2024 Finance Bill protests.
  - Three people die from asphyxia in a sewer trench in Riruta Satellite, Nairobi after the first man got stuck while unblocking it and two other colleagues entered it in a failed rescue attempt.
  - Kenya begins repatriation of its citizens fleeing anti-immigrant protests in South Africa. The repatriates are escaping threats of violence, including physical attacks on them or their businesses.

=== July ===
- 7 July – Police block the Saba Saba Day protests in Nairobi, arresting 10 people after declaring the demonstrations unlawful due to a lack of prior notification.
- 9 July – Edwin Sifuna is officially removed as the secretary general of the Orange Democratic Movement (ODM).
- 10 July – Middle-distance runner Emmanuel Wanyonyi sets a new men's 1,000 metres world record of 2:11.83 at the Herculis, breaking the previous record of 2:11.96 set by fellow countryman Noah Ngeny in 1999.
- 16 July – Ol Kalou Constituency by-election: Sammy Kamau Waweru of the Democracy for the Citizens Party (DCP) wins his first National Assembly seat.
- 22 July – Former Migori County Governor Okoth Obado, his former Personal Assistant Michael Oyamo and former Migori County Clerk Caspal Obiero are found guilty of the 2018 murder of Sharon Otieno.
- 22 – 23 July – The Law Society of Kenya boycotts multiple Kenyan courts in protest to corruption, judicial misconduct and delayed justice, citing the need for accountability and reforms in the judiciary.
- 28 July – 9 September – Nurses across the country begin a months long strike triggered by grievances dating back to 2017, with the Kenya National Union of Nurses (KNUN) accusing the government of refusing to address any of the problems facing Kenyan nurses and citing the strike as a last resort. It ends after the Council of Governors signs a 9 September return to work formula with them.

=== August ===
- 10 August – Nairobi formally submits its bid to host the 2029 World Athletics Championships, with the Kenyan government providing full backing.
- 16 August – Four people are killed during a Linda Mwananchi political rally in Homa Bay.
- 19 August – Seven people are killed when an Eurocopter EC130 B4 carrying tourists crashes at Mount Ololokwe, Samburu County whilst flying to the Loisaba Conservancy. The victims include five American citizens and Ecuadorian intelligence chief Michele Sensi-Contugi.
- 30–31 August – The Kenya Aviation Workers Union (KAWU) resumes its previously suspended strike due to alleged lack of government implementation of the Memorandum of Understanding that ended the previous strike. It results in flight disruptions across the nation's airports including at Jomo Kenyatta International Airport.

=== September ===
- 1 September – A forest fire breaks out at Mount Kenya Forest, consuming 30,000 acres of moorland by 7 September.
- 2 September – Ruto orders a crackdown on foreigners working in small retail shops and hawking, leading to the alleged harassment and violence against foreigners in those jobs.
- 3 September –
  - The High Court upholds that former presidents are legally barred from being leaders of political parties six months after they leave office. This leads to Uhuru Kenyatta vacating the leadership of the Jubilee Party on 15 September.
  - President Ruto orders the departure of Tata Chemicals from Kenya, accusing the firm of exporting soda ash from the country instead of processing it domestically.
- 16 September – Five people including two Anti-Stock Theft Unit (ASTU) officers and a National Police Reserve officer are ambushed and killed in Gotu, Isiolo County.
- 17 September – Four people are killed and at least 22 others seriously injured while attempting to siphon fuel from a petrol tanker involved in an accident in Turbo Constituency, Uasin Gishu County.
- 20 September – Jebet Ngetich breaks the women-only half-marathon world record by one second, running 1:05:15 at the World Athletics Road Running Championships in Copenhagen.
- 30 September – Groundbreaking of the planned Ksh.2 trillion (about $16 billion) Dangote East Africa Refinery.

=== October ===
- 2 – 30 October – Nationwide public university lectures' strike.
- 3 October – A road accident at Salama along the Nairobi–Mombasa Highway in Makueni County kills 17 and injures seven, mostly Catholic pilgrims, that were travelling for a National Prayer Day.
- 6 October – Kenya reports its first ever Ebola case following the death of a patient in Nairobi who had traveled to the Democratic Republic of the Congo and Uganda.
- 14 October – The High Court overturns the criminal acquital of former Kiambu County Governor Ferdinand Waititu, his wife Susan Wangari Ndung'u, former Kiambu County official Luka Wahinya and businessman Charles Chege Mbuthia. Waititu is expected to serve 12 years in prison.
- 19 October – Good News International Ministries cult leader Paul Mackenzie, along with 28 co-defendants of the murders of 190 children as part of the Shakahola Forest incident, is convicted of murder. He is sentenced to 200 years' imprisonment on 6 November.
- 23 October – An 18-storey building along 9th Street in Eastleigh, Nairobi collapses, leaving eight dead and at least 31 people trapped.
- 25 October – A bus collides with a truck along the Nairobi–Mombasa Highway near Mtito Andei, killing 24 people and injuring 22 others.

=== November ===
- 11 November – The last Ebola patient in Kenya is discharged from hospital.
- 13 November – Six people are killed and five others injured, when the top floor of a multistorey building under construction collapses in Syokimau.
- 19 November – Peres Jepchirchir gets a 3 year ban for doping by the Athletics Integrity Unit.

== Holidays ==
Sources:

- 1 January – New Year's Day
- 20 March – Idd-ul-Fitr, the end of Ramadhan
- 3 April – Good Friday
- 6 April – Easter Monday
- 1 May – Labour Day
- 27 May – Eid al-Adha
- 1 June – Madaraka Day
- 10 October – Mazingira Day (previously known as Moi Day)
- 20 October – Mashujaa Day
- 12 December – Jamhuri Day
- 25 December – Christmas
- 26 December – Boxing Day

== Deaths ==
- 28 February – Johana Ng'eno, 53, Member of Parliament for Emurua Dikirr Constituency.
- 29 March – David Njuguna Kiaraho, 62, Member of Parliament for Ol Kalou Constituency.
- 9 May – Allan Thigo, 74, footballer (Gor Mahia, national team).
- 6 November – David Chelule, 49, Olympic long-distance runner (2000).
