= 2021 in Kenya =

- Decades: 2000s; 2010s; 2020s
- See also: Other events of 2021; Timeline of Kenyan history

List of events from the year 2021 in Kenya.

== Incumbents ==
- President: Uhuru Kenyatta

== Monthly events ==
Ongoing – COVID-19 pandemic in Kenya

=== January to March ===
- 8 January
  - COVID-19 pandemic: 97,954 positive cases, 80,671 recoveries to date.
  - The United Nations releases Sh164 million (US$1.5 million) to fight locusts.
- 25 January – Mansur Mohamed Surur is extradited to the United States for smuggling 190 kilograms (420 lb) of rhinoceros horns and 10 short tons (9.1 metric tons) of elephant ivory valued at more than US$7 million.
- 28 January – Kenya orders 118 armored Katmerciler Hızır vehicles from Turkey at a price of €60 million (US$73 million).
- 4 February – Gregory Dow, 61, a Christian missionary from Lancaster, Pennsylvania is sentenced to 15 years in prison for sexually abusing four underage girls at an orphanage he founded near Boito.
- 9 March – U.S. national Isaac Sturgeon, 32, is deported to JFK Airport in New York after being charged in crimes related to the January 2021 Washington riot.
- 24 March – The government orders the United Nations High Commissioner for Refugees (UNHCR) to close the Dadaab and the Kakuma refugee camps, home to 410,000 refugees.
- 25 March – Three DJs on ″Homeboyz Radio Lift-Offare″ are suspended after blaming Eunice Wangari, 20, for getting pushed out of a 12-story window while resisting sexual advances.

== Sports ==
- 18-21 and 23-26 March — Kenya Open and Kenya Savannah Classic (golf) at Karen Country Club in Nairobi
- 17–22 August — 2021 World Athletics U20 Championships
- 23 August — Tusker FC wins The 2020–21 FKF Premier League.
- 24 August–5 September — Kenya at the 2020 Summer Paralympics

== Holidays ==
- 1 January – New Year's Day
- 1 May – International Workers' Day
- 10 October – Utamaduni Day
- 20 October – Mashujaa Day
- 12 December – Jamhuri Day
- 25 December – Christmas Day
- 26 December – Boxing Day

== Deaths ==
- 6 February – Hosea Kiplagat, 76, politician and philanthropist.
- 15 February – John Oyioka, politician, MP (2017–2021).
- 22 February – Two Rothschild's giraffes; electrocuted
- 22 March – Lorna Irungu, 50–51, television presenter and media relations executive; COVID-19.
- 29 March – Sarah Onyango Obama, 99, educator and philanthropist, grandmother of former U.S. President Barack Obama; complications from diabetes and a stroke.
- 21 July – Gideon Mwiti, 61, politician, diabetes.
- 8 September - Orie Rogo Manduli, 73, Politician (1960 – 2026).

== See also ==
- COVID-19 pandemic in Africa
- Al-Shabaab (militant group)
- African Continental Free Trade Area
- International Conference on the Great Lakes Region
