= 2023 in Kenya =

- Decades: 2000s; 2010s; 2020s
- See also: Other events of 2023; Timeline of Kenyan history

Events in the year 2023 in Kenya.

== Incumbents ==
- President: William Ruto
- Deputy President: Rigathi Gachagua
- Chief Justice: Martha Koome

== Events ==
- 30 March – A collision between a Pwani University bus and a minibus in Naivasha, kills 14 people.
- 8 April – At least ten people are killed in Migori, when a truck loses control and crashes into pedestrians.
- 15 April – SpaceX launches Earth observation satellite TAIFA-1, Kenya's first operational satellite, from Vandenberg Space Force Base on a Falcon 9 Block 5 rocket. The satellite will collect environmental data, including on floods, droughts and wildfires.
- 19 June – Kenya signs a trade deal with the European Union (EU).
- 21 June – MPs voted to increase VAT on petroleum products from 8 to 16%. 184 MPs approved the clause within the new finance bill while 88 opposed it.
- 26 June – President Ruto signs into law the finance bill. On the same day, Chief Justice Martha Koome launched a Digital Sex Offenders Registry, which will hold the records of all convicted sex offenders. According to Koome, the automation of the database will ensure easy access to information on convicted sex offenders, facilitating expedited justice.
- 30 June – Londiani multi-vehicle crash. More than 50 people were killed after a truck veered off the road and plowed into a market in Londiani, Kericho County.
- 7 July – Anti-government protests across the country. Opposition leader Raila Odinga led protests to oppose tax increases. Several people were injured, and one man was shot dead.
- 12 July – Anti-government protests continue. At least six were killed and dozens injured, including children.
- 5 October – Government reshuffle in which Musalia Mudavadi replaces Alfred Mutua as Foreign Minister following controversy over the country's involvement in the crisis in Haiti.
- 9 October – A court in Kenya blocks the government from deploying police personnel to Haiti.
- 6 November – 15 people in Kenya are killed during floods caused by significant rainfall. Approximately 241 acres of farmland have been destroyed and 1,067 livestock killed.
- 16 November – The Parliament of Kenya approves the deployment of its police officers to Haiti as part of a United Nations-backed multinational security mission to combat the gang war in Haiti.
- 17 November – The Chief Justice of Kenya, Martha Koome, declared November to be a National Children's Service Month in all court stations to fast track cases involving children, and launched the first such event at the Tononoka Law Courts.
- 23 November – The very last Kenya Certificate of Primary Education (KCPE) results were released by Education Cabinet Secretary Ezekiel Machogu. Marking the end of the 39 year old, primary school part of the 8-4-4 educational system.
- 27 November – The death toll from floods in Kenya rises to 76 as 40,000 people are displaced from their homes.
- 29 November – Kevin McCool, an off-duty British soldier is reported killed while on a motorcycle trip off base.
- 10 December – A nationwide power outage occurs in Kenya as a result of possible sabotage of the country's electrical grid, according to Transport Minister Kipchumba Murkomen.
- 12 December – Kenyan President William Ruto announces that all tourists will no longer require a travel visa to enter the country from January 2024, with the visa being replaced by electronic travel authorisation.
- 22 December – Kenya’s anti-corruption commission charges the country’s former tourism minister and two others with economic crimes for the alleged fraud of tens of millions of dollars in inflated costs for the construction of a hospitality college.

=== Sports ===
- 2022–23 Kenyan Premier League

== Holidays ==
- 1 January – New Year's Day
- 1 May – International Workers' Day
- 10 October – Utamaduni Day
- 20 October – Mashujaa Day
- 12 December – Jamhuri Day
- 25 December – Christmas Day
- 26 December – Boxing Day

== Deaths ==
- 6 January - Edwin Chiloba, Fashion designer, Model, And LGBTQ Activist, (born 1998).
- 24 January – George Magoha, surgeon, (born 1952).
- 28 March – Kulow Maalim Hassan, politician, road death.
- 10 May – Loonkito, lion, (born 2004).
