= 2016 in Kenya =

- Decades: 1990s; 2000s; 2010s; 2020s
- See also: Other events of 2016; Timeline of Kenyan history

The following lists events that happened during 2016 in Kenya.

== Incumbents ==
- Uhuru Kenyatta, President, 2013-current
- William Ruto, Deputy President, 2013-current
- Willy Mutunga, Chief Justice, 2011-2016
- David Maraga, Chief Justice, 2016-current

== Events ==
- A court in Mombasa sentences a primary schoolteacher and imam, Salim Mohamed Wabwire, to 20 years in prison for instructing his pupils to kill Christians. Wabwire, who taught at Jihad Mosque in Mombasa, was acquitted on charges of Al Shabaab membership and terrorist recruitment.
- 63 athletes from Kenya will compete at the 2016 Summer Olympics in Rio de Janeiro, Brazil from 5-21 August

== See also ==
- Timeline of Kenyan history
