= 2019 in Kenya =

- Decades: 1990s; 2000s; 2010s; 2020s
- See also: Other events of 2019; Timeline of Kenyan history

Events of 2019 in Kenya.

== Incumbents ==
- President: Uhuru Kenyatta
- Deputy President: William Ruto
- Chief Justice: David Maraga

== Events ==
- January 15: 2019 Nairobi hotel attack: A terrorist attack in Nairobi kills 21 people and injures 28 more.
- September 30: Kenyan police are put on high alert after recovering intelligence suggesting that several operatives had been sent into the country by al-Shabaab, a Somali jihadist group affiliated with al-Qaeda.
- November 23: A landslide in West Pokot County kills 52 people, including seven children.
