= 2018 in Kenya =

- Decades: 1990s; 2000s; 2010s; 2020s
- See also: Other events of 2018; Timeline of Kenyan history

Events in the year 2018 in Kenya.

== Incumbents ==
- President: Uhuru Kenyatta
- Deputy President: William Ruto
- Chief Justice: David Maraga

== Events ==
=== March ===
- March–June - 2018 East Africa floods
- 9 March – 2018 Kenya handshake
- 19 March – Sudan, last known male northern white rhinoceros, died in Kenya.
- 26 March – A giant crack in the ground, measuring 50 feet deep and 65 feet across, opens in or near Nairobi.

=== May ===
- 9 May – The Patel Dam near the township of Solai, Nakuru County, in the Rift Valley burst amid heavy rains, killing at least 45 people.

=== October ===
- 10 October - At least 51 people are killed when a bus traveling from the Kenyan capital Nairobi to Kisumu veers off the road and overturns.

=== Sports ===
- 9 to 25 February – Kenya participated at the 2018 Winter Olympics in PyeongChang, South Korea

== Deaths ==
- 1 March – Louis Onguto, judge, member of the High Court.
- 15 April – Kenneth Matiba, 85, Permanent Secretary for Commerce (1962–1968), Minister of Health (1983–1988), MP for Mbiri (1979–1990), MP for Kiharu (1992–1997).
- 3 September – Paul Koech, long-distance runner, half marathon world champion (b. 1969).
- 3 October – Joseph Kamaru, benga musician and political activist (b. 1939).
