= 1975 in Kenya =

- Decades: 1950s; 1960s; 1970s; 1980s; 1990s
- See also: Other events of 1975; Timeline of Kenyan history

== Incumbents ==
- President: Jomo Kenyatta
- Vice-President: Daniel Arap Moi
- Chief Justice: Sir James Wicks

== Deaths ==
- 2 March - Josiah Mwangi Kariuki, 45, politician.
