= 2012 in Kenya =

- Decades: 1990s; 2000s; 2010s; 2020s
- See also: Other events of 2012; Timeline of Kenyan history

A list of happenings in 2012 in Kenya:

== Incumbents ==
- President: Mwai Kibaki
- Vice-president: Kalonzo Musyoka
- Chief Justice: Willy Mutunga

== Events ==
=== June ===
- June 10 – 6 people died in the police helicopter crash.
- June 26 - The United States embassy in Nairobi held what was believed to be the first ever LGBT pride event in Kenya. A public affairs officer at the embassy said, "The U.S. government for its part has made it clear that the advancement of human rights for LGBT people is central to our human rights policies around the world and to the realization of our foreign policy goals". Similar events were held at other U.S. embassies around the world.

=== July ===
- July 25 – Moyale clashes occurred.

=== August ===
- August 22 – 52 people died during the Tana River District clashes.

== Deaths ==
=== June ===
- June 10 - George Saitoti and Orwa Ojode are killed in a Helicopter Crash

== Sports ==
- August 9 - At the 2012 Summer Olympics in London, Kenya's David Rudisha led from start to finish to win gold becoming the first and, so far, only runner to have broken the 1:41 barrier for 800m

== See also ==
- 2012 in Kenyan football
