= 2014 in Kenya =

- Decades: 1990s; 2000s; 2010s; 2020s
- See also: Other events of 2014; Timeline of Kenyan history

The following lists events that happened during 2014 in Kenya.

== Incumbents ==
- President: Uhuru Kenyatta
- Deputy President: William Ruto
- Chief Justice: Willy Mutunga

== Events ==
=== April ===
- April 23 - Nairobi police station bombing

=== May ===
- May 4 - 2014 Nairobi bus bombings
- May 16 - Gikomba bombings
- May 30 - Killing of Satao, one of the country's largest elephants by poisoned arrow.

=== June ===
- June 15–17 - Mpeketoni attacks

=== July ===
- July 5–6 - July 2014 Kenya attacks

=== November ===
- November 1 - Unidentified gunmen kill at least 20 police officers in an ambush in Turkana County.
- November 2 - An assault on a police barracks by suspected members of the Mombasa Republican Council separatist group leaves one officer and six attackers dead in Mombasa.
- November 17 - Kenyan police raid two mosques in Mombasa suspected of being linked to Al-Shabaab. One man is killed and over 200 are arrested.
- November 22 - Al-Shabaab militants hijack a bus travelling between the town of Mandera and Nairobi and execute 28 non-Muslim passengers.

=== December ===
- December 2 - The Red Cross says that at least 36 people may have been killed in an attack in Mandera County in northeastern Kenya. Al-Shabaab militants are believed to be responsible.
