= 1982 in Kenya =

- Decades: 1960s; 1970s; 1980s; 1990s; 2000s
- See also: Other events of 1982; Timeline of Kenyan history

The following lists events that happened during 1982 in Kenya.

== Incumbents ==
- President: Daniel arap Moi
- Vice-President: Mwai Kibaki
- Chief Justice: Sir James Wicks then Sir Alfred Simpson

== Events ==
- 8 March – A “Political Information System” seminar convenes in Nairobi, bringing together representatives from single-party states (Malawi, Zambia, Tanzania, Uganda) to discuss the viability of one-party democracy in post-colonial Africa.
- 10 June – Parliament passes a constitutional amendment declaring Kenya a one-party state, making opposition parties illegal.
- 1 August – 1982 Kenyan coup d'état attempt. The attempt took place during the political administration of Daniel arap Moi.
- SoNy Sugar F.C. established

== Births ==
- 3 January – Philip Maiyo, international volleyball player
- 20 December – Rachael Mbogo, Rugby sevens player
- Mwaura Isaac Maigua, politician
- Ruhila Adatia-Sood, television and radio presenter

== Deaths ==
- 1 August – Mark Mwithaga, Nakuru politician
- 7 August – Anthony Vaz, field hockey player
- 24 November – Barack Obama Sr., senior governmental economist
- 6 December – Jean-Marie Seroney, human rights advocate
