= 2013 in Kenya =

- Decades: 1990s; 2000s; 2010s; 2020s
- See also: Other events of 2013; Timeline of Kenyan history

The following list is of events that happened during 2013 in Kenya.

== Incumbents ==
- President: Mwai Kibaki (until 9 April), Uhuru Kenyatta (starting 9 April)
- Deputy President: Kalonzo Musyoka (until 9 April), William Ruto (starting 9 April)
- Chief Justice: Willy Mutunga
- Speaker of the Senate: Ekwe Ethuro (starting 28 March)

== Events ==
- September 21 – al-Shabaab Islamic militants attack the Westgate shopping mall in Nairobi, Kenya, killing at least 62 civilians and wounding over 170.
