= 2015 in Kenya =

- Decades: 1990s; 2000s; 2010s; 2020s
- See also: Other events of 2015; Timeline of Kenyan history

The following lists events that happened during 2015 in Kenya.

== Incumbents ==
- President: Uhuru Kenyatta
- Deputy President: William Ruto
- Chief Justice: Willy Mutunga

== Events ==
=== January ===
- January 4 - A six-story building collapse in Nairobi kills one person and leaves several others injured.
- January 5 - For the second day in a row a multi-story residential building in Nairobi collapses, this time an 8-story building, killing one person with eight people still missing.

=== April ===
- April 2 - Gunmen attack Garissa University College, killing at least 140 people and wounding 65 others.

=== December ===
- December 21 - In an attack on a bus travelling from Mandera to Nairobi, 2 people die and 3 are injured. Muslim passengers protect the non-Muslim passengers by giving them headscarves and refusing to separate into groups, saying "to kill them together or leave them alone".

== Deaths ==
=== December ===
- December 19 - Dick Wathika, 42, a politician, Mayor of Nairobi
