= 2017 in Kenya =

- Decades: 1990s; 2000s; 2010s; 2020s
- See also: Other events of 2017; Timeline of Kenyan history

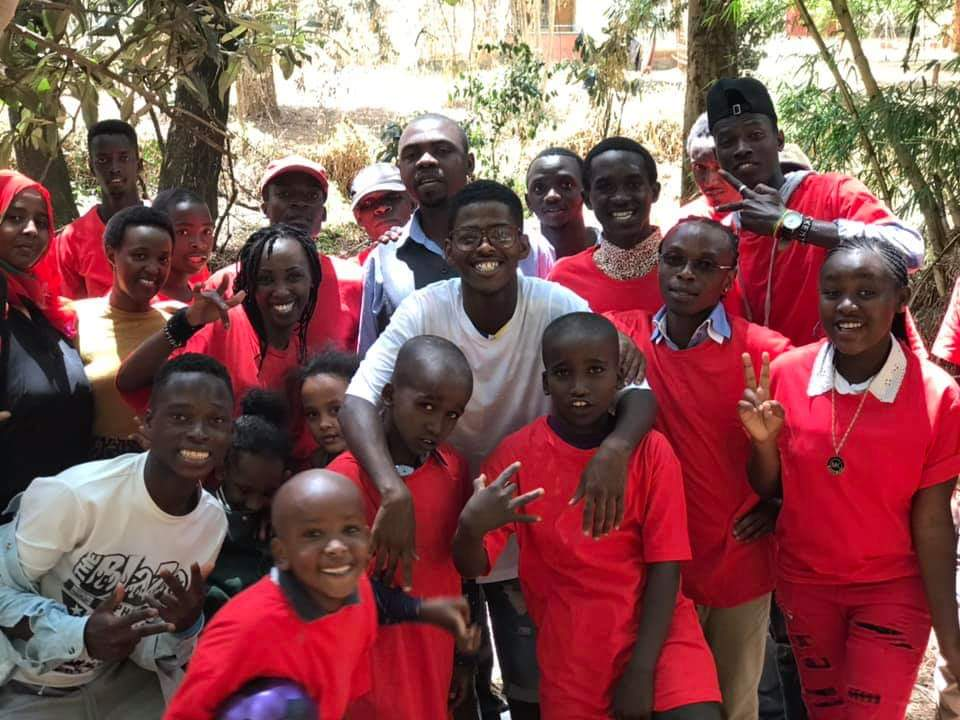

Events in the year 2017 in Kenya.

== Incumbents ==
- President: Uhuru Kenyatta
- Deputy President: William Ruto
- Chief Justice: David Maraga

== Events ==
- 27 January – Battle of Kulbiyow
- 30 May – Inaugural Kenya Standard Gauge Railway freight train launches.
- 31 May – Inaugural Kenya Standard Gauge Railway passenger train, the Madaraka Express, begins travel from Mombasa to Nairobi
- 8 August – Kenyan general election, 2017
- 1 September – the Supreme Court nullified Kenyatta's election victory and ordered that a new presidential election take place within 60 days

== Deaths ==
- 8 January – Colin Cameron Davies, Roman Catholic bishop (b. 1924).
