= 2020 in Kenya =

- Decades: 2000s; 2010s; 2020s
- See also: Other events of 2020; Timeline of Kenyan history

List of events from the year 2020 in Kenya.

== Incumbents ==
- President: Uhuru Kenyatta

== Events ==
- 5 January – War in Somalia: Camp Simba attack.
- 13 March – First case of the COVID-19 pandemic in the country.
- March 15 – Cabinet Secretary for Health, Mutahi Kagwe, announced that two people who had sat next to the initial patient on an aircraft in transit from the United States had also tested positive for the virus.
- 18 June – Kenya narrowly achieves a majority in the second day of voting, defeating Djibouti in the 2020 United Nations Security Council Elections. Kenya wins a two-year seat on the United Nations Security Council to begin 1 January 2021.
- 25 June – Police officers killed three people at a protest in Lesos, Nandi East Sub-County.
- 13 July – A newly acquired MD 530F Cayuse Warrior Kenya Army helicopter crashes in Masinga, Kitui County killing two soldiers.
- 30 October – The United Nations and the World Food Programme launch a major cash and nutrition relief project in conjunction with local and national authorities to provide aid for 400,000 urban poor in COVID-19 hotspots.
- 16 November – COVID-19 pandemic: Schools close and student pregnancies increase during lockdown.
- 10 December – A high court orders the government to compensate four victims of sexual attacks by security agents during post-election violence following the 2007 Kenyan general election.
- 15 December – Somalia cuts diplomatic ties with Kenya after Muse Bihi Abdi from Somaliland visits Kenya.
- 16 December – Cholo Abdi Abdullah, 30, a Kenyan national, is transferred to United States custody after being arrested in the Philippines on terrorism charges in an alleged 9/11-type attack on behalf of Al-Shabaab.
- 21 December – COVID-19 pandemic: Thousands of members of the Kenya Medical Practitioners Pharmacists and Dentists Union go on strike, demanding more PPE and better health insurance. Kenya reports 94,500 COVID-19 cases and 1,639 deaths.
- 30 December – Al-Shabaab gunmen kill a man taking his pregnant wife to hospital.

== Holidays ==
- 1 January – New Year's Day
- 1 May – International Workers' Day
- 10 October – Huduma Day
- 20 October – Mashujaa Day
- 12 December – Jamhuri Day
- 25 December – Christmas Day
- 26 December – Boxing Day

== Deaths ==
- 10 April, Ken Walibora, author and writer, Professor of Swahili literature.
- 6 September – Dickson Wamwiri, Olympic taekwondo practitioner (b. 1984).
- 12 September – Linus Okok Okwach, Roman Catholic prelate and former Bishop of Homa Bay (b. 1952).
- 4 October – Rosemary Aluoch, 44, footballer (Kampala Capital City Authority FC, OC Bukavu Dawa, national team).
- 24 October – Nzamba Kitonga, 64, lawyer and politician.
- 3 December – Kiptarus arap Kirior, Kenyan politician, MP (1983–1988, 1992–1997).
- 11 December
  - Boniface Kabaka, politician, Senator (since 2017), stroke.
  - Joseph Nyagah, 72, politician, COVID-19.
- 18 December – John Obiero Nyagarama, 74, politician, Governor of Nyamira County (since 2013); COVID-19.
- 26 December – Johnson Gicheru, 79, judge, Chief Justice (2003–2011).
- 27 December – Gunga Mwinga, 45, politician, MP (2013–2017).

== See also ==
- 2020 in East Africa
- COVID-19 pandemic in Kenya
- COVID-19 pandemic in Africa
- List of George Floyd protests outside the United States
