= 2011 in Kenya =

- Decades: 1990s; 2000s; 2010s; 2020s
- See also: Other events of 2011; Timeline of Kenyan history

A list of happenings in 2011 in Kenya:

== Incumbents ==
- President: Mwai Kibaki
- Vice-President: Kalonzo Musyoka
- Chief Justice: Johnson Gicheru then Willy Mutunga

== Events ==
=== January ===
- January 1–10 people die when a bus veers off-road in Ngarariga, near Nairobi
- January 4 - A delegation led by Kenyan Prime Minister Raila Odinga fails to solve the 2010–2011 Ivorian crisis
- January 4 - The Minister of Industrialisation Henry Kosgey gives up his cabinet post. Kosgey is subject to corruption investigations and also is one of six Kenyans charged by the International Criminal Court
- January 27 - Simon Mbugua of PNU loses his Kamukunji Constituency parliamentary seat as the 2007 election result was annulled by a court in January 2011
- January 31 - The Commission on the Implementation of Constitution declares unconstitutional the recent naming of Chief Justice and other top juridical posts by the President Mwai Kibaki

=== February ===
- February 9 - Ten people die as a bus collides with a truck in Sachangwan along the Nakuru-Eldoret highway
- February 12 - Nine people die as a matatu and a bus collide at the Matunda bridge along the Kitale-Webuye road.
- February 16 - Joseph Gitari of PNU won the Kirinyaga Central Constituency parliamentary by-election
- February 18 - Bonny Khalwale of New Ford Kenya loses his Ikolomani Constituency parliamentary seat as the High Court cites electoral malpractice in the 2007 election

=== March ===
- March - Thousands of residents flee Mandera town as fighting between Somali militia escalates in the area
- March 9 - The International Criminal Court summons six previously named Kenyans to appear at the court in the Hague on April 7, 2011. Meanwhile, a faction of Kenyan government, including President Mwai Kibaki and Vice President Kalonzo Musyoka are calling for ICC to drop the cases. See also: International Criminal Court investigation in Kenya

=== September ===
- September 12 - Over 100 people die in a pipeline fire in Sinai slum, Nairobi

=== October ===
- October 16 - Kenyan Defense Forces enter southern Somalia as part of Operation Linda Nchi. The KDF intervened to provide a buffer between terrorist group Al-Shaabab and the Kenyan Border. The forces remain in Kenya until 31 May 2012.

== Deaths ==
=== January - March ===
- January 1 - Lessa Lassan, musician,
- January 6 - Duncan Nyamari (a.k.a. Alfayo), 25, actor of Mheshimiwa drama series, shot dead
- March 12 - Paul Kiptoo arap Koech, politician
- March 15 - Musa Juma, 42, musician, pneumonia

=== April - June ===
- May 16 - Samuel Wanjiru, 24, Olympic gold medal-winning marathon runner, fall from balcony.

=== July - September ===
- July 31 - Habel Kifoto. musician, bandleader of Maroon Commandos, suspected heart failure
- September 25 - Margaret Ogola, 53, writer
- September 25 - Wangari Maathai - 71, Environmental and human rights activist, Nobel Peace Prize laureate (2004), cancer

== Sports ==
=== January - March ===
- February 12 - Kenya Harlequins retains the Kenya Cup rugby title
- February 18 - Mary Keitany sets a new World Half marathon record at the Ras Al Khaimah Half Marathon (time 1:05:50 hours)
- February 19-March 20 - Kenya participated the 2011 Cricket World Cup in, but lost all their six matches
- February 20 - The 2010 FKL Cup winners Sofapaka beats league champions Ulinzi Stars 1-0 to retain the Kenya Supercup
- March 6 - Kenya wins all categories at the 2011 African Cross Country Championships in Cape Town, South Africa. John Mwangangi and Mercy Cherono won the men's and women's titles, respectively

=== July - September ===
- September 25 - Patrick Makau wins Berlin Marathon setting a new marathon World record. Florence Kiplagat won the Women's race.
