= 2019 West Pokot landslide =

Landslide in Kenya

On 22nd-23rd November, landslides and mudslides took place in parts of West Pokot County resulting in the death of 72 people and displacement of more than 10,000 people. Farms, food stores and livestock were swept away, and two bridges along the Kitale-Lodwar road and along Sigor road were rendered impassable, leaving road users stranded and disrupting communication networks.This followed an overnight downpour that lasted 12 hours, preventing residents from leaving their homes. Villages affected included Parua, Nyarkulian, Sebit, Muino, Tamkal, and Batei. Kenya experiences landslides, mudslides, and floods during two rainfall seasons: March to May and October to December.The county has experienced similar disasters, including a 2008 mudslide in Cheptulel that killed 14 people. The October to December 2019 season ranked among the wettest in East Africa in the last 40 years. It was driven by a strong positive Indian Ocean Dipole, where warmer waters in the western Indian Ocean and cooler waters in the eastern Indian Ocean resulted in higher rainfall across Eastern Africa. The Kenya meteorological department issued warnings on 18 November, advising residents in landslide-prone areas to be on high alert. Floods affected at least 31 of 47 Kenyan counties, impacting more than 160,000 people, with nearly 18,000 displaced.

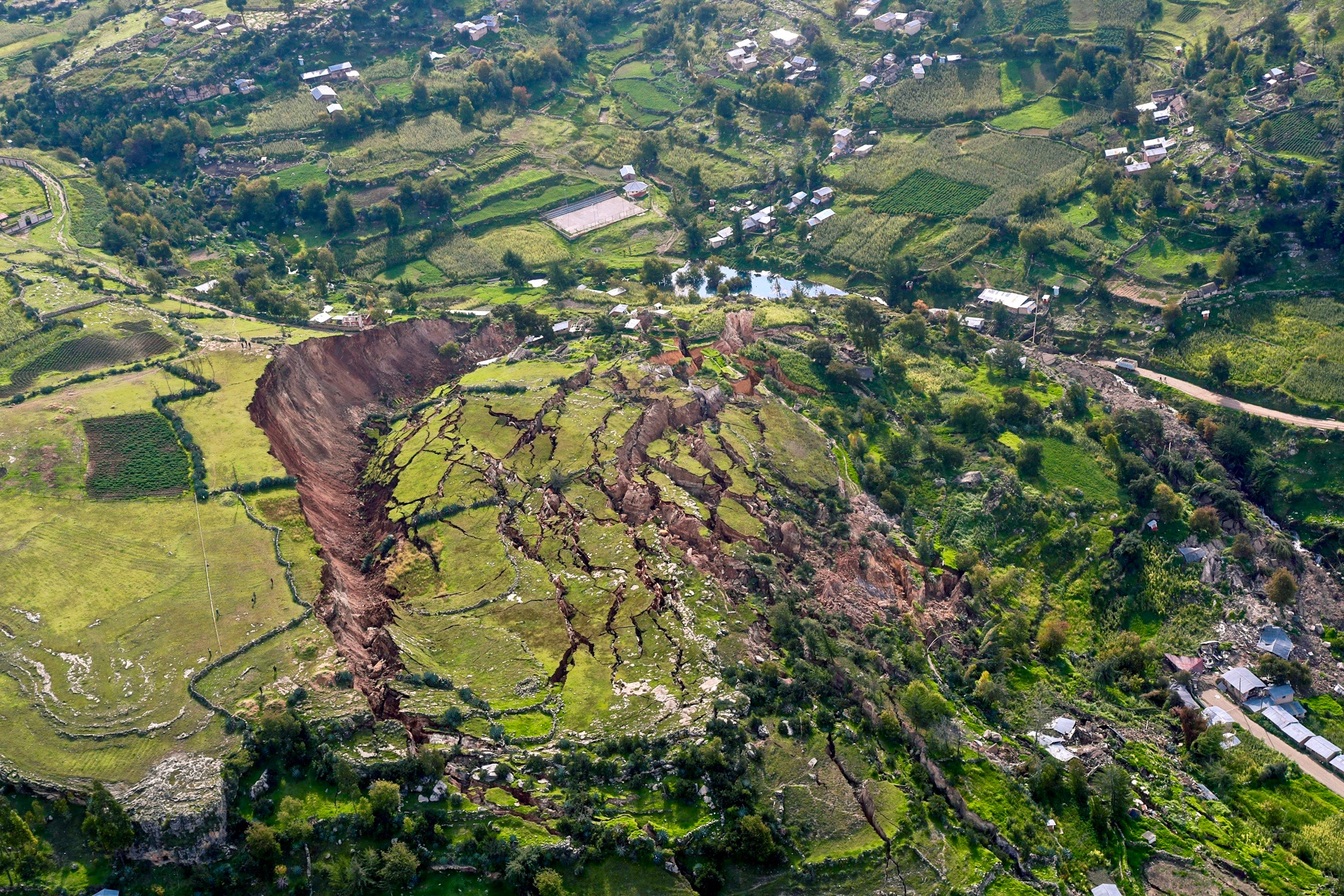
A typical landslide. This image is from Peru and is used for illustration.

== Background ==
West Pokot County borders Uganda to the west whereas its eastern, northern, and southern boundaries are shared with the Kenyan counties of Elgeyo Marakwet, Baringo, Trans Nzoia, and Turkana. The county's hilly terrain makes it susceptible to landslides. West Pokot's economy relies on agro-pastoralism a combination of mixed farming and nomadic pastoralism, and its rainfall ranges between 400mm and 1,500mm.

== Local and international response ==
The humanitarian response to the 2019 West Pokot landslide was a coordinated effort by county authorities, national agencies, and international partners. The County Emergency and Disaster team led the rescue operations, supported by the deployment of 40 medical personnel from Moi Teaching and Referral Hospital to reach communities cut off after roads and bridges were destroyed. A multi-agency team, comprising the Kenya Defence Forces, Kenya Police, Kenya Red Cross Society (KRCS), and the County Disaster Management Unit, carried out ground operations. A psychosocial support desk was established at Kapenguria County Referral Hospital to assist affected families. Evacuation centres and a dedicated hospital ward at the county referral hospital were established for the victims. Authorities appealed for assistance, stating the county had never experienced such a disaster. More than 15 camps hosting displaced persons remained inaccessible by road after sections of the Kapenguria–Lodwar Highway and several feeder roads were cut off.

The Kenya Red Cross used drone technology to conduct aerial assessments of the affected areas. UNICEF supported disease prevention and public health measures distributing WASH items, including 3,000 buckets, 144,000 Aqua tabs, and 1,500 jerrycans. The organisation also distributed dignity kits to children and conducted advocacy with partners through local radio channels to promote hygiene and child protection. 5,861 children (3,468 girls, 2,393 boys) were displaced in West Pokot.The International Federation of Red Cross and Red Crescent Societies released over 300,000 Swiss francs to support KRCS operations nationwide, and the Red Cross Society of China donated USD 100,000. Church World Service provided food and blankets to 750 households in Pakach and Tamkal Wards and planned to support shelter and reconstruction. Despite these efforts, the response faced challenges. Damaged infrastructure, delayed operations, coordination failures, poor targeting, and political patronage and nepotism hindered aid delivery. Many families faced vulnerabilities due to the earlier drought, complicating recovery and increasing the need for humanitarian support.
