= COVID-19 pandemic in Kenya =

- Disease: COVID-19
- Pathogen: SARS-CoV-2
- Location: Kenya
- First outbreak: Wuhan, Hubei, China
- Index case: Nairobi
- Arrival date: 13 March 2020 (6 years, 7 months, 2 weeks and 2 days)
- Confirmed cases: 344,162
- Recovered: 256,551
- Deaths: 5,689
- Fatality rate: 1.65%
- Vaccinations: 14,494,372 (total vaccinated); 11,090,440 (fully vaccinated); 23,750,432 (doses administered)

Government website
- www.health.go.ke

The COVID-19 pandemic in Kenya was a part of the worldwide pandemic of coronavirus disease 2019 (COVID-19) caused by severe acute respiratory syndrome coronavirus 2 (SARS-CoV-2). The virus was confirmed to have reached Kenya on 12 March 2020, with the initial cases reported in the capital city Nairobi and in the coastal area Mombasa.

== Background ==
On 12 January 2020, the World Health Organization (WHO) confirmed that a novel coronavirus was the cause of a respiratory illness in a cluster of people in Wuhan, Hubei, China, which was reported to the WHO on 31 December 2019.

The case fatality ratio for COVID-19 has been much lower than SARS of 2003, but the transmission has been significantly greater, with a significant total death toll. Model-based simulations for Kenya indicate that the 95% confidence interval for the time-varying reproduction number R_{t} has been lower than 1.0 since August 2021.

== Timeline ==
Kenya has so far experienced seven waves of COVID-19: (1) July–September 2020; (2) October 2020–January 2021; (3) February–July 2021; (4) August–October 2021; (5) November 2021–January 2022; (6) June–July 2022; (7) November–December 2022.

=== March 2020 ===
- On 13 March, the first case in Kenya, a 27-year-old Kenyan woman who traveled from the US via London, was confirmed. The Kenyan government identified and isolated a number of people who had come into contact with the first case.
- On 15 March, Cabinet Secretary for Health, Mutahi Kagwe, announced that two people who had sat next to the initial patient on the aircraft in transit from the United States had also tested positive for the virus.
- On 15 March 2020, President Uhuru Kenyatta directed that the following measures to curb COVID-19 be implemented:
  - "Travel from any countries with any case of Corona virus be restricted.
  - "Only Kenyan Citizens, and any foreigners with valid residence permits will be allowed to come into the country provided they proceed on self quarantine or to a government designated quarantine facility.
  - "All schools and higher learning institutions be closed by Friday March 20, 2020.
  - "Government and businesses people start remote work; except essential services.
  - "Cashless transactions over cash. Cost of transactions reduced.
  - "No congressional meetings – weddings, malls, night clubs, churches, limitation of visits to hospitals.
  - "Hospitals and Shopping malls to give soap and water/hand sanitizers, and regular cleaning of facilities.
  - "Cargo vessels, aircraft or ships can come into the country provided they are disinfected at point of departure and the crew quarantined on arrival.
  - "UN Headquarters in Kenya continue operating diplomats travelling to the UN are also exempted from the travel restrictions but observe the self-quarantine rule.
  - "A toll-free number (719) set up to report suspected corona virus cases."
- Cabinet Secretary Mutahi Kagwe banned all social gatherings including religious gatherings on the same date. All flights were banned effective Wednesday 25 March by the Health CS.
- On 16 March, the government through its spokesman Colonel Cyrus Oguna said on an update that there were another three people who were suspected to be carriers of the virus and that their results were to be released soon.
- On 17 March, it was announced by the Health Secretary that a fourth case had been diagnosed. On 18 March, three more cases confirmed were by the Health Secretary, bringing the total confirmed cases in Kenya to seven.
- On 22 March, eight more cases were confirmed by the Health Secretary, bringing the total cases confirmed to 15. The government confirmed it was tracing 363 people who are believed to have had contact with the eight new cases.
- On 23 March, another case was confirmed bringing the total confirmed cases to 16.
- On 24 March, nine more cases reported for a total of 25 nationally.
- On 25 March, the first recovery was confirmed, and three more cases were recorded, bringing the total confirmed cases to 28.
- On 26 March, three more cases were recorded and bringing the total confirmed cases to 31. In addition to Nairobi, the government confirmed that COVID-19 cases in Kenya are spread among four other counties, namely Kajiado, Mombasa, Kilifi, and Kwale. On the same date, the first death of a person infected with the COVID-19 was reported in Kenya. The patient was a 66-year-old Kenyan man who had recently returned from a business trip in Eswatini and had transited via O. R. Tambo International Airport in Johannesburg, South Africa. It is unknown where exactly he contracted the virus.
- On 28 March, the ministry of health confirmed 7 more cases, bringing a total tally of confirmed COVID-19 cases in Kenya to 38. On the same day, the government announced that 2 patients who had earlier tested positive had tested negative and were awaiting for a second test to confirm they had fully recovered.
- On 29 March, four more cases were recorded bringing the total confirmed cases to 42. During a briefing on Sunday, Health Cabinet Secretary Mutahi Kagwe said of the four, one is a Kenyan, one American, one Cameroonian and one a Burkinabé. Mr Kagwe said three of the cases were based in Nairobi and one in Mombasa. The Secretary said of the 42 cases, 24 are male while 18 are females. Nairobi leads with 31 cases followed by Kilifi (six), Mombasa (Three) and Kwale and Kajiado one each.
- On 30 March, Kenya's coronavirus cases have risen by 8, with the total now standing at 50 that have been confirmed, Health Cabinet Secretary Mutahi Kagwe on Monday said that of the eight confirmed cases, six were based in Nairobi, one in Kitui and one in Mombasa.
- On 31 March, Kenya's COVID-19 cases rose by 9, bringing the total to 59 confirmed cases to date.

=== April 2020 ===
- On 1 April, Kenya's COVID-19 cases rose by 22, bringing the total to 81 confirmed cases to date. Additionally, the Kenyan government confirmed that the first and third reported cases had both full recovered from the virus, bringing the total number of recoveries nationally to three.
- On 2 April, an additional 29 cases were confirmed bringing the total number of cases to 110 nationally. The government reported one more recovered patient increasing the total recoveries to four. Additionally, two more deaths were confirmed, one from Nairobi and the one in Mombasa, bringing the total number of deaths due to coronavirus to three.
- On 4 April, 4 more cases were recorded out of a total sample of 325 cases.
- On 6 April president Uhuru Kenyatta announced a cessation of movement in and out of The Nairobi Metropolitan Area for a containment period of 21 days, other counties affected by the cessation are; Mombasa and Kilifi and Kwale county that would take effect as from 8 April
- On 8 April, the number of people with COVID-19 increased by 14 confirmed cases as announced by the Health Secretary, bringing the total number to 179.
- On 9 April, the health cabinet secretary announced an increase in number of confirmed cases by 5 bringing the total number of people with COVID-19 to 184. He also announced an increase in number of deaths to 7.
- On 10 April, 5 more cases of people who tested positive for the Coronavirus were confirmed as announced by the health secretary, bringing the total number of the confirmed cases to 189, it was also announced that 10 patients who had tested positive for Coronavirus have tested negative and are awaiting to be discharged from Mbangathi hospital, bringing the recovery cases to 22.
- On 13 April, the total number of cases was announced to have reached 208, with a total of 9 deaths and 40 discharged-and-recovered.
- On 15 April, the total number of cases was announced to have reached 225, with a total of 10 deaths and 53 discharged-and-recovered.
- As of 15 April 2020, the Kenyan Ministry of Health reported 9 new cases increasing the total number of cases to 225, 12 new recoveries thus increasing the number of total recoveries to 53. The Ministry also reported 1 new fatality, increasing the total number of fatalities to 10.
- 2366 people had been tested as of 15 April 2020, 1911 people had been released after testing negative and 455 people were still subject to follow up according to statistics provided by the Kenyan Ministry of Health.
- The number of confirmed cases reached 396 by the end of April. There had been 17 fatalities while 144 patients had recovered, leaving 235 active cases at the end of the month.
- In April 2020, the Cabinet Secretary for Health, Mutahi Kagwe, impressed on the need for eating food that boosts immune system as an avenue for beating the COVID-19 pandemic.

=== May 2020 ===
- There were 1566 new cases in May, bringing the total number of confirmed cases to 1962. The death toll rose to 64. The number of recovered patients increased to 478, leaving 1420 active cases at the end of the month.

=== June 2020 ===
- On 5 June, The Ministry of Health announced 134 new cases bringing the total number of cases to 2,474 people. The total number of recoveries was 643 and total number of deaths was 79. Samples tested since the pandemic started was 90, 875
- On 6 June, President Uhuru Kenyatta announced that the Nationwide dusk to dawn curfew will be extended for a further 30 days but will now run from 9 pm to 4 am. (Previously was 7pm to 5am).
- The Cessation of Movement into and out of Nairobi Metropolitan Area, Mombasa County and Mandera County was on 6 June, extended for a further 30 days. While the cessation of movement in and out of Eastleigh area in Nairobi Metropolitan Area, Old Town area in Mombasa County, Kilifi County and Kwale County will be lifted as from 4 am Sunday 7 June 2020.
- The President also announced on 6 June, that schools will 'gradually' open from 1 September.
- During June there were 4404 new cases, raising the total number of cases to 6366. The death toll more than doubled to 148. The number of recovered patients increased to 2039, leaving 4179 active cases at the end of the month.

=== July to September 2020 ===
- On 6 July, President Uhuru Kenyatta announced the following:-
  - The Cessation of Movement into and out of Nairobi Metropolitan Area, Mombasa County and Mandera County shall be lifted as from Tuesday 7 July at 4 am.
  - Nationwide 9 pm to 4 am curfew extended for a further 30 days.
  - Ban on social gatherings and suspension on operation of bars extended for a further 30 days.
  - Places of worship will also commence phased reopening in strict conformity with all applicable guidelines. However, he noted that no congregants under 13 or over 58 years should be allowed. Those with underlying health conditions have also been cautioned against congregating to worship.
  - Local air travel shall resume as from 15 July under Ministry of Health and Transport guidelines.
  - International flights to resume as from 1 August.
- On 24 July 2020, government spokesman Cyrus Oguna announced that he had tested positive for COVID-19.
- There were 14,270 new cases in July, raising the total number of confirmed cases to 20,636. The death toll more than doubled to 341. The number of recovered patients increased by 6,126 to 8,165. At the end of the month there were 12,130 active cases.
- There were 13,565 new cases in August, raising the total number of confirmed cases to 34,201. The death toll rose to 577. At the end of the month there were 13,731 active cases.
- There were 4,177 new cases in September, bringing the total number of confirmed cases to 38,378. The death toll rose to 707. The number of recovered patients increased to 24,740, leaving 12,931 active cases at the end of the month.

=== October to December 2020 ===
- There were 16,814 new cases in October, bringing the total number of confirmed cases to 55,192. The death toll rose to 996. The number of recovered patients increased to 36,963, leaving 17,233 active cases at the end of the month.
- There were 28,426 new cases in November, bringing the total number of confirmed cases to 83,618. The death toll rose to 1,469. The number of recovered patients increased to 55,344, leaving 26,805 active cases at the end of the month.
- On 17 December, The Nation reported that officials were expecting COVID-19 vaccines sufficient for 20% of the population to begin arriving in the country the next month, January 2021.
- There were 12,840 new cases in December, taking the total number of confirmed cases to 96,458. The death toll rose to 1,670. The number of recovered patients increased to 78,737, leaving 16,051 active cases at the end of the year.
- John Obiero Nyagarama, 74, Governor of Nyamira County (2013–2020) died from COVID-19 on 18 December.

=== January to March 2021 ===
- Dr. Patrick Amoth, director general of public health, said on 7 January that Kenya will start receiving 24 million doses of Oxford–AstraZeneca vaccine in February. Health workers and teachers will have first priority for the voluntary shots.
- Kenya's first two cases of the 501.V2 variant were reported on 20 January. There were 4,315 new cases in January, taking the total number of confirmed cases to 100,773. The death toll rose to 1,763. The number of recovered patients increased to 83,907, leaving 15,103 active cases at the end of the month.
- There were 5,200 new cases in February, taking the total number of confirmed cases to 105,973. The death toll rose to 1,856. The number of recovered patients increased to 86,678, leaving 17,439 active cases at the end of the month.
- Mass vaccination commenced on 5 March, initially with 1.02 million doses of AstraZeneca's Covishield vaccine supplied under the COVAX pillar.
- On 26 March, President Uhuru Kenyatta announced a cessation of all movement by road, rail, and air into and out of the disease-infected area as one zoned area comprising the counties of Nairobi, Kajiado, Machakos, Kiambu, and Nakuru. The hours of the ongoing nationwide curfew were revised to commence at 8:00 pm and end at 4:00 am in the zoned area comprising the counties of Nairobi, Machakos, Kajiado, Kiambu, and Nakuru. The rest of the country will be observing curfew between 10:00 pm to 4:00 am.
- There were 28,085 new cases in March, taking the total number of confirmed cases to 134,058. The death toll rose to 2,153. The number of recovered patients increased to 92,679, leaving 39,226 active cases at the end of the month.

=== April to June 2021 ===
- There were 25,995 new cases in April, taking the total number of confirmed cases to 160,053. The death toll rose to 2,744. The number of recovered patients increased to 108,799, leaving 48,520 active cases at the end of the month.
- There were 10,682 new cases in May, taking the total number of confirmed cases to 170,735. The death toll rose to 3,172. The number of recovered patients increased to 116,847, leaving 50,714 active cases at the end of the month. A total of 969,489 vaccine doses had been administered by 31 May.
- There were 13,426 new cases in June, taking the total number of confirmed cases to 184,161. The death toll rose to 3,634. The number of recovered patients increased to 125,684, leaving 54,843 active cases at the end of the month.

=== July to September 2021 ===
- There were 19,052 new cases in July, taking the total number of confirmed cases to 203,213. The death toll rose to 3,931. The number of recovered patients increased to 188,936, leaving 10,346 active cases at the end of the month.
- There were 32,650 new cases in August, taking the total number of confirmed cases to 235,863. The death toll rose to 4,726. The number of recovered patients increased to 223,637, leaving 7,500 active cases at the end of the month. A total of 2,773,239 vaccine doses had been administered by 31 August, including 804,583 second doses.
- There were 13,571 new cases in September, taking the total number of confirmed cases to 249,434. The death toll rose to 5,123. The number of recovered patients increased to 241,520, leaving 2,791 active cases at the end of the month.

=== October to December 2021 ===
- There were 3,876 new cases in October, bringing the total number of confirmed cases to 253,310. The death toll rose to 5,281. The number of recovered patients increased to 246,829, leaving 1,200 active cases at the end of the month.
- There were 1,778 new cases in November, bringing the total number of confirmed cases to 255,088. The death toll rose to 5,335. The number of recovered patients increased to 248,318, leaving 1,435 active cases at the end of the month.
- Kenya's first case of the omicron variant was announced on 15 December.
- There were 39,940 new cases in December, raising the total number of confirmed cases to 295,028. The death toll rose to 5,378. The number of recovered patients increased to 252,281, leaving 37,369 active cases at the end of the month. Modelling by WHO's Regional Office for Africa suggests that due to under-reporting, the true cumulative number of infections by the end of 2021 was around 24 million while the true number of COVID-19 deaths was around 17,403.

=== January to March 2022 ===
- There were 26,353 new cases in January, raising the total number of confirmed cases to 321,381. The death toll rose to 5,583. The number of recovered patients increased to 294,722, leaving 21,076 active cases at the end of the month.
- There were 1,549 new cases in February, bringing the total number of confirmed cases to 322,930. The death toll rose to 5,639. The number of recovered patients increased to 303,248, leaving 14,043 active cases at the end of the month.
- There were 493 new cases in March, bringing the total number of confirmed cases to 323,423. The death toll rose to 5,648. The number of recovered patients increased to 317,641, leaving 134 active cases at the end of the month.

=== April to June 2022 ===
- There were 363 new cases in April, bringing the total number of confirmed cases to 323,786. The death toll rose to 5,649. The number of recovered patients increased to 317,978, leaving 159 active cases at the end of the month.
- There were 982 new cases in May, bringing the total number of confirmed cases to 324,768. The death toll rose to 5,651. The number of recovered patients increased to 318,461, leaving 656 active cases at the end of the month.
- There were 8,926 new cases in June, bringing the total number of confirmed cases to 333,694. The death toll rose to 5,652. The number of recovered patients increased to 323,953, leaving 4,089 active cases at the end of the month.

=== July to September 2022 ===
- There were 3,928 new cases in July, bringing the total number of confirmed cases to 337,622. The death toll rose to 5,672. The number of recovered patients increased to 331,415, leaving 535 active cases at the end of the month.
- There were 539 new cases in August, bringing the total number of confirmed cases to 338,161. The death toll rose to 5,674. The number of recovered patients increased to 332,337, leaving 150 active cases at the end of the month.
- There were 278 new cases in September, bringing the total number of confirmed cases to 338,439. The death toll rose to 5,678.

=== October to December 2022 ===
- There were 674 new cases in October, bringing the total number of confirmed cases to 339,113. The death toll remained unchanged. The number of recovered patients increased to 333,025, leaving 410 active cases at the end of the month.
- There were 2,523 new cases in November, bringing the total number of confirmed cases to 341,636. The death toll rose to 5,684. The number of recovered patients increased to 335,346, leaving 606 active cases at the end of the month.
- There were 863 new cases in December, bringing the total number of confirmed cases to 342,499. The death toll rose to 5,688. The number of recovered patients increased to 336,730, leaving 81 active cases at the end of the month.

=== January to December 2023 ===
- There were 1,595 new cases in 2023, bringing the total number of confirmed cases to 344,094. The death toll rose to 5,689.

== Statistics ==
=== Confirmed new cases per day ===
View source data.

=== Confirmed deaths per day ===
View source data.

== Government response ==
In response to the rise of COVID-19 cases in Kenya to three, on 15 March the government of Kenya closed all schools and directed that all public and private sector workers remote work wherever possible. Travel restrictions were later imposed to prevent non-residents from entry. Kenyan nationals and residents were required to self-quarantine for a minimum of fourteen days.

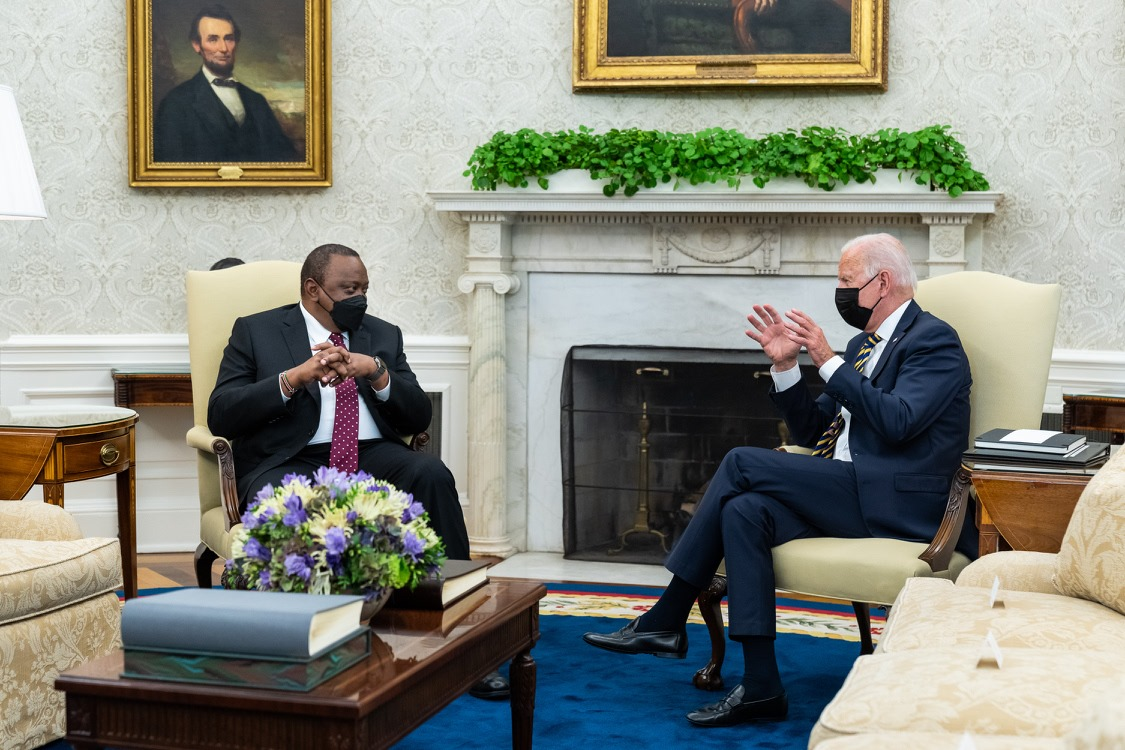
Kenyan President Uhuru Kenyatta meets with United States President Joe Biden, October 2021

On 22 March, following the confirmation of an additional eight cases, bringing the total to 16 nationally, the Kenyan government introduced additional measures and directives to reduce the spread of coronavirus in the country. These measures included a suspension of all international flights effective at midnight on 25 March, with the exception of cargo flights (all persons entering the country will be compelled to undergo quarantine at a government facility). The government further stipulated that any persons, including senior government officials, found to be in violation of quarantine measures would be forcefully quarantined at their own expense. All bars were to remain closed from 22 March, with restaurants allowed to remain open for takeaway services only. All public service vehicles (i.e., matatus and buses) had to adhere to passenger-distancing guidelines previously stipulated on 20 March. Further, all public gatherings at churches, mosques, funerals and elsewhere were restricted to no more than 15 people, and weddings were banned.

In May 2020, Kenyan authorities dislodged 8000 people from 2 informal settlements, compelling them to live on streets for weeks. This increased the possible risk of spreading COVID-19 among them. The people were also vulnerable of being arrested for breaking curfews.

=== Economic response ===
On 25 March, President Uhuru Kenyatta, following the reporting of an additional three cases, announced a nationwide curfew on unauthorized movement from 7pm to 5am beginning on Friday, 27 March. The government also unveiled measures to buffer Kenyans against financial hardships arising movement restrictions associated with the coronavirus crisis, including:

- 100% tax relief to Kenyans earning KSh 24,000 (US$228) and below.
- Pay as you earn (PAYE) reduction from a maximum of 30% to 25%.
- Reduction of turnover tax rate from 3% to 1% for all micro, small and medium enterprises.
- Reduction of resident income tax to 25%.
- Making available KSh 10 billion (US$95 million) to vulnerable groups including the elderly and orphans, among others.
- Temporary suspension of the listing of loan defaulters for of any person, micro, small and medium enterprise and corporate entities whose loan account is in arrears effective 1 April 2020.
- Reduction of VAT from 16% to 14% effective 1 April 2020.

The government also moved to increase the allocation of funds for health care, along with other fiscal adjustments to the economy:

- KSh 1 billion (US$9.5 million) from the Universal Health Coverage kitty to be channelled to the employment of new health workers to help combat the spread of COVID-19.
- The President and Deputy President to take 80% pay-cut, all Cabinet Secretaries to take 30% pay-cuts, Chief Administrative Secretaries (30%) and Principal Secretaries (20%).
- All State and public officers aged 50 and above; and have preexisting medical conditions, to take leave from work, or be allowed to remote work. This directive excludes those public officers working in the security department.
- Central Bank of Kenya to lower the Central Bank Rate from 8.25% to 7.25%.
- Reduce the Cash Reserve Ratio from 5.25% to 4.25% to increase liquidity of KSh 35 billion to commercial banks, which, in turn, will be in positions to provide loan services to "distressed Kenyans".

=== Nationwide curfew and police response ===
The 7pm – 5am curfew announced on 25 March was accompanied by reports of police brutality. First-hand accounts and video footage in several cities, including Nairobi and Mombasa, indicated that police used beatings and tear gas on 27 March. Some accounts indicate that detention resulted in crowding of people into small areas, contrary to the curfew's goal of increasing social distancing. Kenyan officials and government outlets later condemned police behaviour.

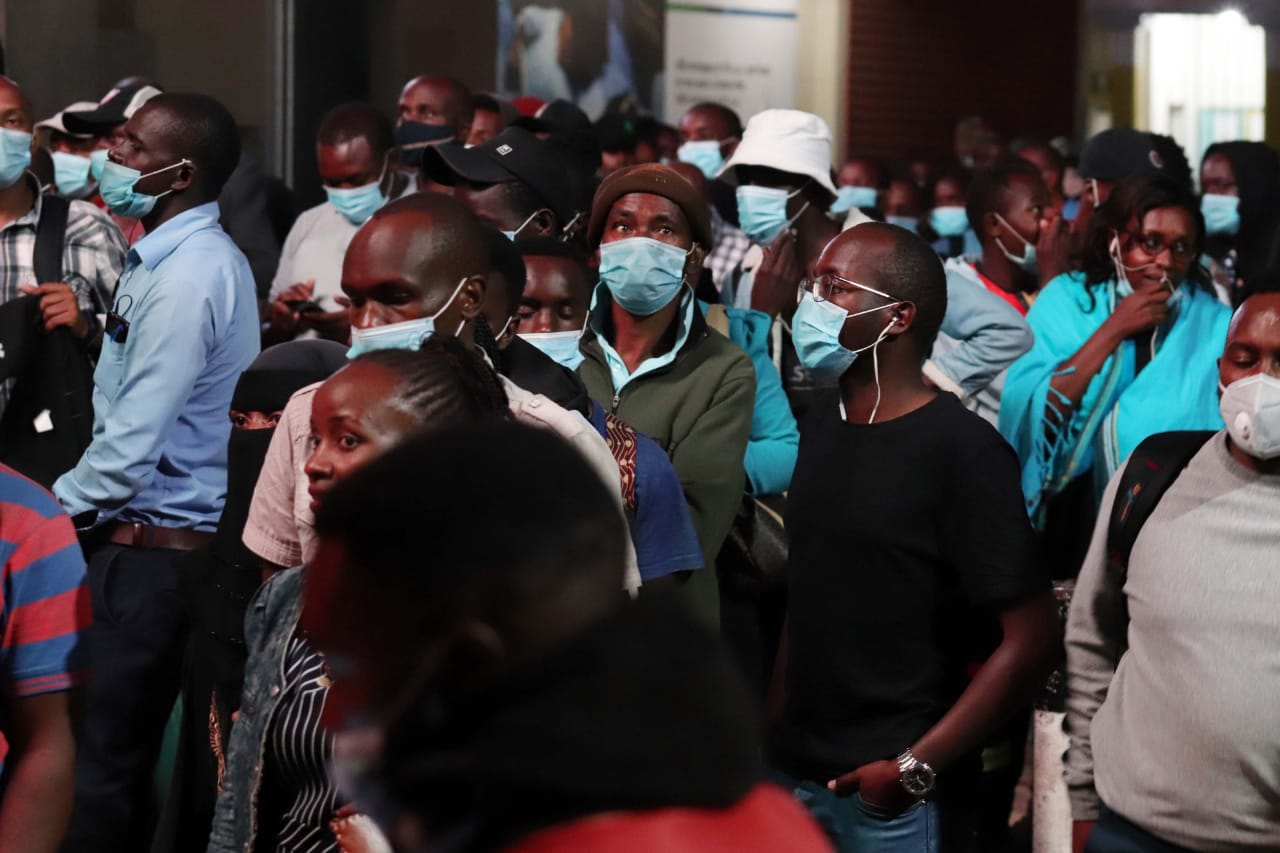
People in Nairobi wear masks as they wait to board the bus in order to make it home before curfew, April 2021

Subsequently, a petition was filed by Law Society of Kenya claiming that the curfew itself was unconstitutional, "because it is blank and indefinite, and because it is ultra vires [it contravenes] the Public Order Act" and that the curfew posed a threat to the health of the general population. The petition further asserted that, "police recklessly horded large crowds on the ground, contrary to WHO advice on social distancing. Moreover, the first respondent (police) stopped the media from monitoring their movement and assaulted journalists covering the process".

On 30 March, the High Court of Kenya upheld the curfew itself, but barred police from using excessive force to enforce the curfew and demanded the police provide guidelines for observing the curfew.

On 31 March, a 13-year-old boy was shot dead, allegedly by police, on the balcony of his home in Kiamaiko, Nairobi, 20 minutes after the curfew had started. On 25 April, additional 21 days were added as curfew with focus still in Nairobi, Mombasa, Kilifi and across the country.

=== Closure and reopening of schools ===
The Kenya Government shut down all schools and colleges on 15 March 2020 in a measure to prevent the spread of coronavirus in Kenya. At the time of school shutdown, there were less than 10 daily reported COVID-19 cases and not a single death. However, the growing cases were of concern to the government which wanted to prevent a spike in cases as it happened in parts of Europe.

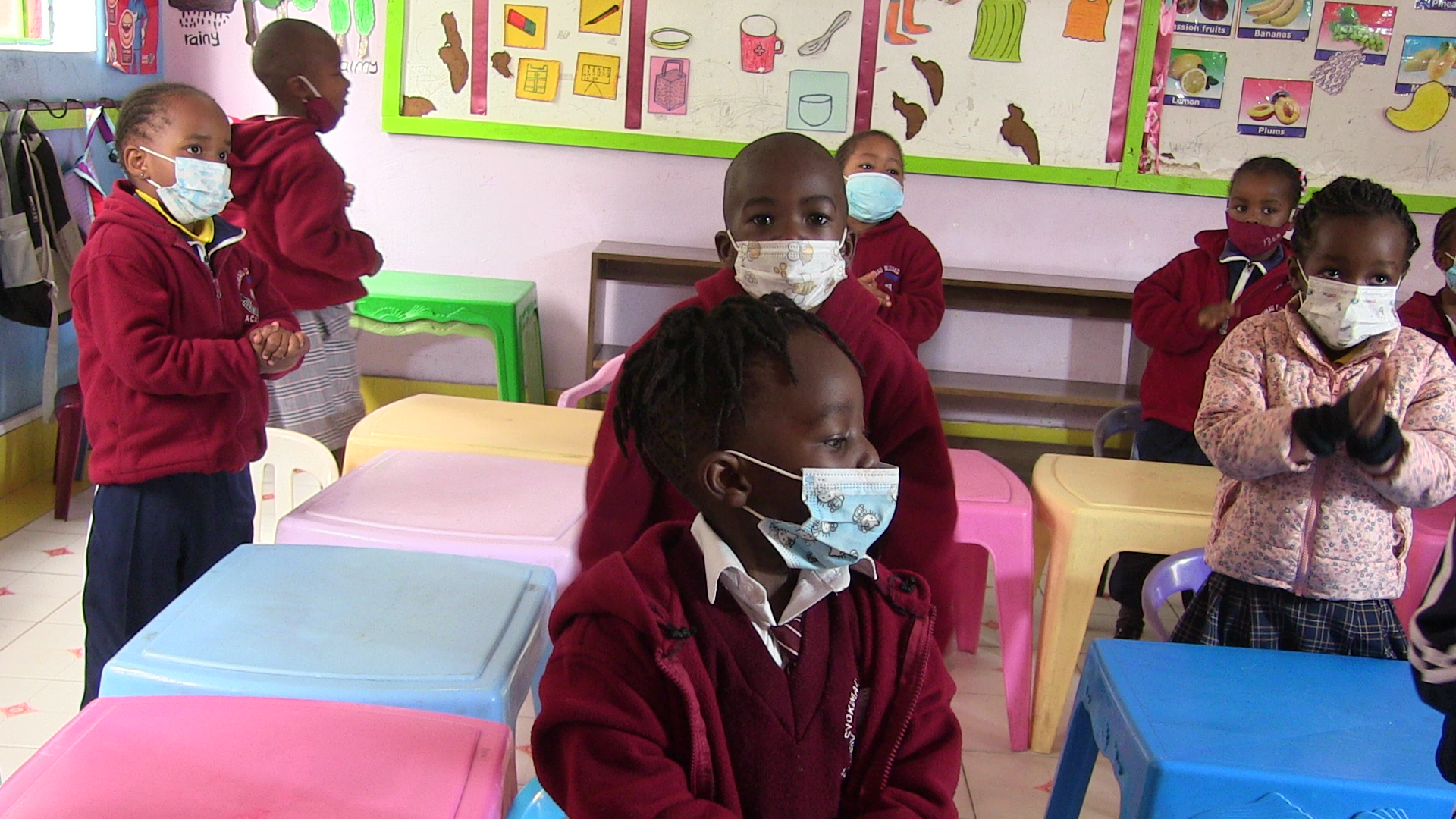
Pupils wearing masks during class in a school in Kenya, July 2021

On 11 September 2020, the Ministry of Education, through the CS George Magoha announced that preparations were being made to allow a phased re-opening of schools. These preparations allowing schools time to set-up their safety measures and training teachers and staff the necessary protocols for handling students. Schools are required to install handwashing facilities in strategic places, ensure they have enough running water and to have thermo guns for taking temperatures, teach about proper mask wearing and ensure students kept on their masks throughout while at school and outside.

On Monday, 4 October 2020, Grade 4, Class 8, and Form 4's reported back to school in the first part of the progressive reopening of schools. They remained in school for the second term, which ran until 23 December.

The second part of the progressive re-opening of schools started on 4 January 2021. All the students who had attended the first phase reported back for their term 3, while the rest of the students reported for their second term. These were students from: PP1 and 2, Grade 1, 2 and 3, Class 5, 6 and 7 and Form 1, 2 and 3's. Schools closed 19 March 2021 to complete the second term for the second lot.

The class 8 and form 4's were left behind to sit for their National examinations with standard 8 pupils sitting for their KCPE exams on 22–24 March 2021 and form 4's sitting for their KCSE exams on 25 March - 16 April 2021. The 2020 KCPE results were announced on 15 April 2021, and the 2020 KCSE results were announced on 10, May 2021 by CS Prof George Maghoha.

== Impact ==
The travel restrictions reduced Kenya's hotel, tourism and flower industries. In contrast to citizens in industrialized countries, some Kenyans have the ability to switch from their city jobs to rural labour for food.

The Safari Rally, which was scheduled on 16–19 July to marked the sixty-eighth running of the event and planned to be the seventh round of World Rally Championship in its return since 2002, was cancelled and would return in 2021.

In September 2021 the United Kingdom removed Kenya from its 'Red' list of COVID-affected countries.

== See also ==
- COVID-19 pandemic in Africa
- COVID-19 pandemic by country and territory
- Ministry of Health (Kenya)
- Kenya Medical Research Institute
- 2020 in Kenya
