= 2021 Lolldaiga conservancy wildfire =

Fire in Kenya

The 2021 Lolldaiga conservancy wildfire was a man made disaster caused by soldiers of the British Army who set fire to a nature reserve in central Kenya during a military training exercise.

The fire destroyed 12,000 acres of land belonging to the Lolldaiga conservancy, which was home to lions, hyenas, elephants, jackals, and the rare endangered Grévy's zebra.

One man, Linus Murangiri, was crushed to death by a vehicle during attempts to put out the fires. There were also reports of elderly people suffering eye injuries and a baby being hospitalised for smoke inhalation.

During a court hearing into the incident, some of the soldiers who started the fire were alleged to have been high on cocaine. After the fire, British soldiers made jokes about the incident. According to the BBC one soldier wrote: "

Two months in Kenya later and we've only got eight days left. Been good, caused a fire, killed an elephant and feel terrible about it but hey-ho, when in Rome."

According to the BBC, the incident led to an environmental lawsuit signed by almost 1,000 local residents. In 2022 the Kenya News Agency reported that 6,000 local residents had filed for compensation from the British Army.

In 2025, the UK government agreed to pay compensation to 7,723 claimants affected by the wildfire.
