= 1992 in Kenya =

- Decades: 1970s; 1980s; 1990s; 2000s; 2010s
- See also: Other events of 1992; Timeline of Kenyan history

The following lists significant events and births that happened during 1992 in Kenya:

== Events ==
=== August ===
- ?? August — FORD split into two factions, FORD-Asili and FORD-Kenya

=== December ===
- 29 December - Daniel arap Moi is re-elected as president of Kenya

=== Unknown date ===
- 5000 people are killed and 75000 displaced in ethnic conflict in the Rift Valley Province

== Births ==
- 9 October - Caleb Mwangangi Ndiku, Distance runner
