= Denar Joseph Hamisi =

Kenyan politician (1969–2025)

Denar Joseph Hamisi (1969 – 6 December 2025) was a Kenyan politician.

== Life and career ==
Hamisi was born in 1969, and attended Mombasa Baptist High School from 1984 to 1989, before graduating from the University of Nairobi.

He was a member of the national assembly as a member of the Amani National Congress.

Hamisi died on 6 December 2025, at the age of 56.
