= John Oyioka =

Kenyan politician (died 2021)

John Oroo Oyioka (died 15 February 2021, in Kisumu) was a Kenyan politician who served as a Member of Parliament for the Peoples Democratic Party from 2017 till his death in 2021 from COVID-19.
