= Targeting (politics) =

Focusing of resources

Targeting in politics is widely used in determining the resources of time, money, and manpower to be deployed in political campaigns. Political parties, campaign committees and political action committees prefer to place their resources disproportionately in constituencies where victory is possible, but not assured.

== In the United States ==
A given constituency may be targeted for one purpose, but not for another. In the US, inner city neighborhoods, with heavy Democratic populations, may not be targeted for legislative seats because the districts are safely Democratic, but will be targeted for presidential elections to offset strong Republican areas elsewhere.

Targeting has had important side effects. Heavily Democratic or Republican states tend to get little resources because of the emphasis on targeted states. Similarly, heavily Democratic or Republican legislative or Congressional districts are downplayed in significance.

Targeting leads to the magnification of political trends. A constituency that might give the minority party 25% or 30% instead may fall to 10% or 15% over time because of lack of effort by its minority party. Local minority parties may atrophy and die: the majority party may rise to over 95% of the vote in some constituencies.

Because of the negative effects on minority parties in ignored or downplayed constituencies, targeting is becoming increasingly controversial. One strong critic of targeting, then-Pennsylvania State Rep. Mark B. Cohen of Philadelphia, has opposed targeting by new political organizations, warning that "targeting is counterproductive to the long-range interests of the Democratic Party. Elections are not short-term one-shot events, but recurring long-term events that require long-term organizational efforts in as many places as possible."

== In the United Kingdom ==
In the UK, similar processes affect the ways in which some constituencies get far more party attention than others. For example, usually the marginal constituencies in the Midlands receive far more attention from campaigners than either Surrey or the North-East, as they are solidly Conservative and Labour strongholds respectively. Other strategies may inform how seats are targeted, however. In the 2005 UK General Election, the Liberal Democrats targeted seats held by the Conservatives that had comparatively small majorities and were held by prominent Tory MPs such as Oliver Letwin, David Davis and even Michael Howard. In the event, this so-called "decapitation" strategy had hardly any success. Only Tim Collins lost his seat of those targeted.

== In Canada ==
In Canada, which has a Westminster system similar to that found in the UK, the spread and effects of targeting are similar to that found in the United Kingdom. Canada, which has seen regionalism play a role in its national politics, will see odd targeting patterns, where a province, Alberta for example, might be ignored by a party which usually does not do well there, the Liberals for example, while an Edmonton, a large city in Alberta, will see heavy targeting as the Liberals attempt to win at least some representation from that province. The biggest contrast with the US system is the idea of a “Full Slate”; That is running a candidate in every possible seat. US congressional elections can pass with some members being elected without opposition, whereas in Canada, parties will normally try to field a full slate of Candidates.

== Bibliography ==
- Dobber, Tom; Helberger, Natali (18 December 2017). "Is political micro-targeting hijacking European democracy?". Internet Policy Review.
- Dubois, Frédéric (27 September 2018). "Is Political Micro-Targeting Hijacking European Democracy?". doi:10.5281/zenodo.1438133.
- Witzleb, Normann; Paterson, Moira; Richardson, Janice, eds. (2020). Big Data, Political Campaigning and the Law: Democracy and Privacy in the Age of Micro-Targeting. Milton Park, Abingdon, Oxon New York, NY: Routledge. ISBN 978-0-367-23054-8.
