= KOKO Networks =

Kenyan cooking fuel company

- Industry: Cooking fuel Cooking equipment
- Founded: 2014
- Area served: Kenya; Rwanda
- Key people: Greg Murray (CEO)
- Website: kokonetworks.com

KOKO Networks is a cooking fuel and equipment company headquartered in Nairobi, Kenya. It primarily provides bioethanol as cooking fuel to customers to replace charcoal fuel.

== History ==
The company Koko was founded in 2014. It soft-launched its ethanol cooking fuel product in Nairobi in mid-2017 and throughout 2018. The product was publicly launched in July 2019 for Nairobi. The company launched a retail platform aimed at small shops in December 2021 to distribute other products aside from bioethanol.

By 2021, the company had opened locations in Mombasa. It announced an expansion into Rwanda in 2022 in a partnership with the venture capital firm Dalberg Ventures. In August 2023, the company claimed that it had passed 1 million households as customers.

In 2026, Koko announced its closure, citing the Kenyan government's failure to authorize carbon credits and import permits for bioethanol made from molasses. This had wide-ranging implications for carbon credit markets. On 1 February 2026, Pricewaterhousecoopers took over Koko Network's operations, with PwC's Muniu Thoithi and George Weru being appointed joint administrators.

== Financing ==
As of August 2023, the company has spent over US$100 million in subsidies for its customers, financed by international carbon markets. It has sold carbon credits in South Korea and stated its plans to do so in Singapore and Japan. It also has a partnership to sell carbon credits with the South African Rand Merchant Bank, which had also invested in the company. In March 2025, the Multilateral Investment Guarantee Agency issued a 15-year political risk guarantee of US$179.6 million for the company.

== Operations ==
Koko supplies its bioethanol from imports and from sugarcane processing waste in a partnership with Vivo Energy, while its stoves are manufactured in India. As of 2022, it sells a set of a cooker, fuel canister, and initial stock of bioethanol for approximately US$15. The bioethanol is sold from 300-liter filling stations resembling ATMs, typically located in dense neighborhoods. According to the Financial Times, the company operated 700 such machines in 2019. The company claims to employ 1,800 people with operations in eight Kenyan cities in mid-2023.
