= Kyalo Mbobu =

Kenyan lawyer (1960s–2025)

Mathew Kyalo Mbobu
- Born: 1960s
- Died: 9 September 2025; Karen, Nairobi
- Cause of death: Assassination
- Burial place: Mua, Machakos County
- Citizenship: Kenyan
- Occupation: Lawyer

Mathew Kyalo Mbobu (born 1960s), was a Kenyan lawyer, advocate and law lecturer. He also served as the chairman of the Political Parties Disputes Tribunal of Kenya.

== Education ==
Mbobu had a degree in Bachelor of Laws (LL.B). He proceeded to enroll at Georgetown University in Washington, D.C., where he obtained a Master of Laws (LL.M).

== Career ==
=== Legal career ===
Mbobu served as an advocate at the High Court of Kenya for over three decades and specialised in constitutional law, civil litigation, and public interest cases. He was the Senior Partner at Kyalo & Associates Advocates, a law firm based in Nairobi. The firm specialises in commercial litigation, arbitration, and corporate law.

Mbobu served as the chairperson of the Political Parties Disputes Tribunal in the years around 2017. The tribunal is responsible for settling intra-party feuds and nomination disputes.

He was a law lecturer at the University of Nairobi school of law.

== Death and investigations ==
On 9 September 2025, unknown gunman on a motorcycle opened fire at Mbobu's car, shooting him 8 times and killing him on the spot. The drive-by shooting occurred at Magadi road in Karen while he was heading back home.

Senate Speaker Amason Kingi publicly condemned his killing and called on the police to "to carry out speedy and thorough investigations". The Law Society of Kenya called on the authorities to bring the killers to book.

DCI launched investigations into the murder with little evidence to start with, according to interior cabinet secretary Kipchumba Murkomen, who in an address to the press stated that the incident happened at a place with no CCTV cameras but affirmed that law enforcement had delved into the case and asked the public to volunteer any information that could assist in apprehending those responsible for Mbobu's death.

Three individuals who had been detained as persons of interest in the killing were released.

== Personal life ==
At the time of his death, Mbobu was married. He was a Catholic.

== Works ==
He is the author of the book The Law and Practice of Evidence in Kenya, which covers among other topics witness testimony, confessions and documentary evidence.

== See also ==
- George Muchai — Kenyan politician shot dead on 7 February 2015
- Charles Were — Kenyan politician shot dead on 30 April 2025
