= Collins Jumaisi Khalusha =

Kenyan suspected serial killer

- Born: 3 February 1991 (age 35); Vihiga County, Kenya
- Other names: The Kware maniac Butcher of Kware; The Beast of Kware; The Kware Ripper; Monster of Kware; Killer Collins; The Vampire
- Occupation: Motorcycle taxi driver (former)
- Spouse: Imelda Judith Khalenya (m. 2021; died 2022)

Collins Jumaisi Khalusha (born 3 February 1991) is a Kenyan suspected serial killer who escaped police custody in August 2024.

He was arrested after ten bodies were discovered in Nairobi. He allegedly confessed to the murder of 42 women, including his wife, Imelda Judith Khalenya. He escaped police custody along with twelve undocumented Eritrean migrants after being allegedly assisted by insiders. Eight officers who were on duty at the time have since been suspended. Khalusha pleaded not guilty to manslaughter, with his lawyer claiming he was tortured to falsely confess.

== Early life ==
Khalusha was born in Vihiga County on 3 February 1991 to Margaret Rose Jumaisi. After his father died in 1995, he moved with his mother and three siblings to Migori County.

== Alleged crimes ==
Khalusha allegedly murdered 42 women, ranging in age between 18 and 30, over a two-year period, with the first being his wife, Imelda Judith Khalenya.

== Arrest and escape from police custody ==
Khalusha was arrested in July 2024, after ten bodies and multiple body parts were discovered in plastic bags in Nairobi. Two others, Amos Momanyi and Moses Ogembo, were arrested after they were found with mobile phones allegedly belonging to some of the deceased. On 20 August 2024 Khalusha escaped from Gigiri Police Station with 12 Eritreans, who were detained for illegal immigration. They reportedly cut through wire mesh at approximately 03:00. They then climbed a perimeter wall to escape.
