= Kenyan taxation system =

The Kenyan taxation system covers income tax, value-added tax, customs and excise duty. The regulations are governed by independent legislators that govern the taxation system, the main legislator, the Kenya Revenue Authority (KRA) has different sections that deal with the above taxes while also having the authority to undertake reviews on various companies and corporations. The main goal of the system is to enhance tax compliance through simplified and efficient tax administration.

== Income tax ==
The Income Tax Act is the most important tax used in Kenya. It is up to the employer to make sure that the taxes are deducted at source, that employees pay taxes and that they have a personal identification number (PIN) with the KRA. There is a fine of $22 for every payment made to an employee who does not have a PIN. The tax rate is 30% for everyone but there are many exemptions from tax including medical insurance for an employee and his all of his / her dependents, the reimbursement of expenses incurred by employees while working and there is a non cash benefit of up to $396 per month to all employees. There is also a PAYE tax which is applicable to all employees that is calculated as follows.

== Taxable income ==
Taxable Income	Interest Rate %
KSh. 1/= – 1,467/46	10
1,467/46 – 2,849/94	15
2,849/94 – 4,233/56	20
4,233/56 – 5,616/44	25
5,616/44 and Above	30

== Value Added Tax ==
VAT is chargeable on goods and services that are sold in or imported into Kenya. The standard rate of VAT for all normal goods is 16%.

=== Exempt goods and services ===
Schedules to the current VAT act list goods and services that are exempt from VAT or are taxable at zero rate. Those who pay for VAT on exempt goods are required to file a form for reimbursement within twelve months of the payment being made for full reimbursement to the KRA. Exports from Kenya pay a 0% rate of VAT.

== Tax penalties ==
Late payment or non-payment of taxes attracts an interest rate of 2% per month. However, filing a late monthly payment of VAT requires a charge of 5 percent or $110, whichever is higher.

== Corporate tax ==
The Corporate Tax Act was set up to deal with all corporate tax issues. All companies must register with the KRA for a PIN. They must then register for each applicable tax for which they are liable which will usually include Income Tax, PAYE, VAT and Excise duty. The Corporate Tax rate is currently a flat rate of 30%.

Furthermore, they are required to register with the NHIF(http://www.nhif.or.ke/healthinsurance/) which was set up to provide National Health cover. The rate of Tax due are calculated as follows;

Gross Income	Contribution
0>5999	150
6000 - 7999	300
8000 – 11999	400
12000 – 14999	500
15000 – 19999	600
20000 – 24999	750
25000 – 29999	850
30000 – 49999	1000
50000 – 99999	1500
>100000	2000
Self Employed	500

There is also the NSSF (National Social Security Fund) which is used to create a pension scheme, to collect and administer contributions in Kenya.

== Residence in Kenya ==
For Tax purposes a resident of Kenya is defined as anyone who is present in Kenya for 183 days during a 12-month period. An individual that stays in Kenya for longer than 183 days is considered to be a resident from the day of arrival. After leaving, Kenyan tax liability of an individual ends. This is also the case if a person stays for over 122 days a year on average over a period of 2 or more years. Non-residents staying in Kenya for a period shorter than 183 days are subject to national income tax on any income. They are also subject to municipal income tax as well as residents.

== Excise duty ==
In 2015, the Excise Duty act was amended by the president of Kenya. There is currently specific duty rates on all goods with exemptions to food supplements and the supply of services subject to excise which are currently charged at 10% of their value. Services that are eligible for Excise duty are defined as any fees, charges or commissions charged by financial institutions relating to their licensed financial institutions, but excludes interest on loan or return on loan or an insurance premium or premium based or related commissions.

The current excise tax is calculated currently take into account inflation which changes annually. The rate is calculated in an A x B format where A is the rate of excise duty from the previous day and B Is the adjustment factor on the day calculated as one plus annual average rate of inflation of the preceding financial year.

== Customs duty ==
Customs duties in Kenya include import duty, excise duty, VAT, import declaration fee and railway development levy. When goods are imported, the following charges are applied depending on the type of goods. There is an import declaration fee (IDF) which is 2.25% of the value of the good with a minimum of 5,000/= payable. There is a railway development levy of 1.5% also payable. There is also the usual charges that include import duty, excise duty, and VAT.

== Trading zones ==
Kenya is a member of the EAC (East African Community) and COMESA (Common Market for Eastern and Southern Africa) which have their own specific rates on imports and exports. There is currently free trade allowed in the 19 member states of COMESA..
