= Mazingira Day =

Kenyan environmental holiday

Mazingira Day, formerly celebrated as Moi Day, is a public holiday in Kenya. It is celebrated each year on 10 October and is dedicated to environmental conservation and sustainability. It can also be described as a national day of unity to address ecological challenges.

The name mazingira is Swahili for "the environment".

== History ==
Moi Day was established as a national holiday in 1988, under the rule of Kenyan President, Daniel Moi. Its initial purpose was to celebrate Moi's 10 year reign as head of state since his 1978 ascention to the Presidency. It evolved to honour the former President.

Following the promulgation of the Constitution of Kenya in August 2010, Moi Day was removed from the list of Kenyan national holidays. However, on 8 November 2017, Justice George Odunga of the High Court termed its removal as a violation of "Section 2(1) as read with part 1 of the schedule to the Public Holidays Act" of the Constitution and ruled for its restoration.

On 19 December 2019, the cabinet approved the renaming of Moi Day to Huduma Day. Which was intended to celebrate national unity and community service. The word huduma is Swahili for "service" or "care". It was renamed yet again; this time to Utamaduni day when then Cabinet Secretary, Fred Matiang'i gazetted it as such with the goal of celebrating the country's rich cultural diversity in 2020.Utamaduni is the Swahili word for "culture".

The Ruto administration rebranded the public holiday to Mazingira Day from Utamaduni Day. The changes were effected by the President on 24th April 2024.

== Events ==
The theme for the 2025 Mazingira day was "Citizen Centric Tree Growing and Environmental Stewardship." The national event was held at Kabuyefwe Primary School in Trans-Nzoia County.

The theme for the 2026 Mazingira day was "Our Environment, Our Responsibility: Collective Action for Tree Growing and Environmental Stewardship." The year's event was also held in Trans-Nzoia County.

== Related award ==
In late 2023, the First Lady of Kenya, Rachel Ruto launched a new award: the First Lady's Mazingira Awards (FLAMA). Its an annual competition awarded each year on Mazingira day with patronage from the First Lady. Its aim is to fulfill the planting of 15 billion trees by 2032 and "nurture and empower learners as agents of change for environmental conservation and climate action and promote an environment-centred entrepreneurship culture among learners." 2024's theme was "Restore our Land, Secure our Future" in Swahili Turejeshe Ardhi Yetu, Tuhakikishe Mustakabali Wetu. The theme for the 2025 awards was "End Pollution - Conserve the Environment" or Komesha Uchafuzi - Hifadhi Mazingira in Swahili.

The 2026 FLAMA was a departure from the norm: instead of being awarded on Mazingira day, it was launched on Mazingira day. It's theme is "Climate Action: My Responsibility" in Swahili Hatua za Tabianchi: Jukumu Langu.

== See also ==
- Jamhuri Day – National holiday in Kenya
- Public holidays in Kenya
