= Deputy President of Kenya =

Second-highest constitutional office in Kenya

Deputy President of the Republic of Kenya
- Naibu Rais wa Jamhuri ya Kenya
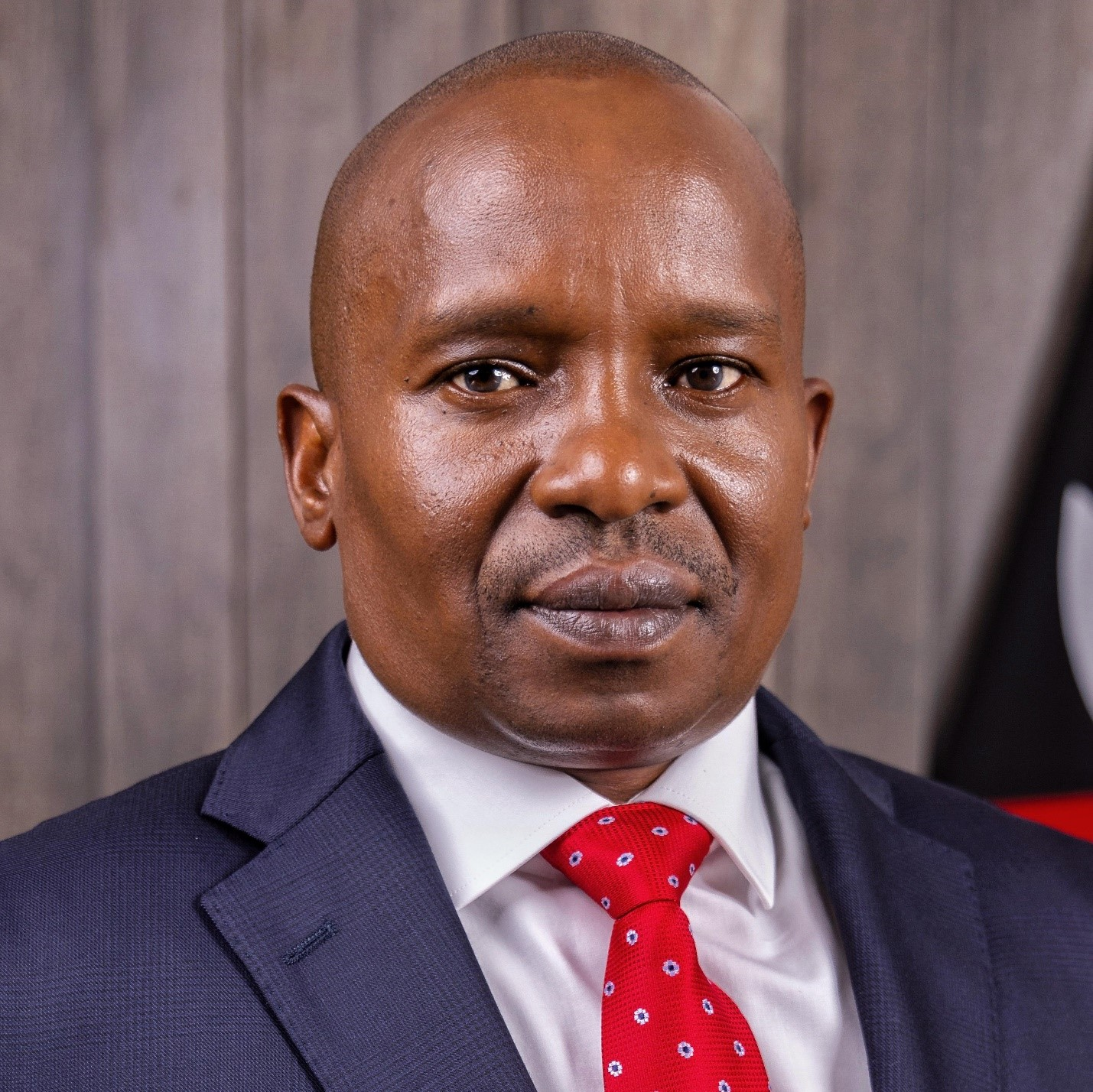
- Incumbent; Kithure Kindiki since 1 November 2024
- Executive Branch of the Government; Office of the Deputy President
- Style: Mr. Deputy President, or even simply Deputy President (informal); His/Her Excellency (diplomatic); The Right Honourable (formal, within the Commonwealth)
- Status: Second highest executive branch officer
- Residence: The Deputy President's Mansion
- Seat: Nairobi
- Nominator: Presidential candidate
- Appointer: Direct popular vote or, if vacant, President
- Term length: Five years, renewable once
- Constituting instrument: Constitution of Kenya
- Inaugural holder: Jaramogi Oginga Odinga
- Formation: 12 December 1964; 61 years ago
- Salary: KSh.14,724,000.00 annual
- Website: www.deputypresident.go.ke

The deputy president of the Republic of Kenya (Swahili: Naibu Rais wa Jamhuri ya Kenya) is the principal assistant to the President of the Republic of Kenya. The current appointed deputy president of Kenya is Kithure Kindiki. He has been serving in this position since 1 November 2024.

== History ==
Prior to the 2010 Constitution of Kenya, the deputy president was known as the vice president, and the president had the power to appoint and dismiss the vice president at will.

In order to remove the repeated abuse of this privilege, the new Constitution promulgated in 2010 mandated that the person nominated as the running mate of a candidate for the presidency during the elections becomes the deputy president-elect upon their candidate being declared the winner of the presidential elections. In addition to this change in appointing responsibility, unlike in the previous Constitution where the vice president usually held a secondary role of being a Cabinet Minister, the new Constitution mandates that the deputy president is not permitted to hold any other state or public office and shall only perform the duties assigned to the office by the Constitution and by the president.

Since the country's independence, there has been one vacancy in the office, from 8 January 1998 until 3 April 1999. Three of Kenya's Vice/Deputy Presidents, Mwai Kibaki, Daniel arap Moi and William Ruto have gone on to serve as president, with the latter currently serving as the incumbent president since 13 September 2022. Prior to this, he served as acting president for a few days after president Uhuru Kenyatta temporarily transferred his powers and office to appear before the International Criminal Court.

== Qualifications and election to office ==
The 2010 Constitution states that for a person to become the Deputy President, the person must be nominated as the running mate of a candidate in the presidential elections and the person must themselves qualify to be nominated as a candidate for election as president.

Upon a person being nominated as a running mate and their candidate wins the elections, the Independent Electoral and Boundaries Commission then declares that the candidate is the President-elect, and the running mate is subsequently the Deputy President-elect.

The Deputy President-elect takes office on the same day as the President-elect and serves from the date sworn in until:

1. The next President-elect is sworn in.
2. Upon assuming the office of the President; or
3. Resignation, death or being removed from office under the conditions provided by the Constitution

== Responsibilities ==
The following is a summary of the responsibilities of the Deputy President as provided in the Constitution:

1. Serves as the President's principal assistant and deputises for the President in the performance of the responsibilities of the President.
2. The Deputy President acts as the President if the sitting President is absent, temporarily incapacitated or whenever the President assigns this responsibility; and
3. Performing any other responsibility assigned by the Constitution and the President.

== List of officeholders ==
Political parties

Kenya African National Union (KANU)
National Rainbow Coalition (NARC) / Party of National Unity (PNU)
Orange Democratic Movement – Kenya (ODM–K)
Jubilee Alliance (JA)
United Democratic Alliance (UDA)

Symbols

^{†} Died in office

No.	Picture	Name (Birth–Death)	Term of office			Political party
No.	Picture	Name (Birth–Death)	Took office	Left office	Time in office	Political party
Vice President of Kenya
1		Jaramogi Oginga Odinga (1911–1994)	12 December 1964	14 April 1966	1 year, 123 days	KANU
2		Joseph Murumbi (1911–1990)	3 May 1966	30 November 1966	211 days	KANU
3		Daniel arap Moi (1924–2020)	5 January 1967	22 August 1978	11 years, 229 days	KANU
4		Mwai Kibaki (1931–2022)	14 October 1978	24 March 1988	9 years, 162 days	KANU
5		Josephat Karanja (1931–1994)	24 March 1988	1 May 1989	1 year, 38 days	KANU
6		George Saitoti (1945–2012)	1 May 1989	8 January 1998	8 years, 252 days	KANU
6		George Saitoti (1945–2012)	3 April 1999	30 August 2002	3 years, 149 days	KANU
7		Musalia Mudavadi (born 1960)	4 November 2002	3 January 2003	60 days	KANU
8		Michael Kijana Wamalwa (1944–2003)	3 January 2003	23 August 2003^{[†]}	232 days	NARC
9		Moody Awori (born 1928)	25 September 2003	9 January 2008	4 years, 106 days	NARC / PNU
10		Kalonzo Musyoka (born 1953)	9 January 2008	9 April 2013	5 years, 90 days	ODM–K
Deputy President of Kenya
11		William Ruto (born 1966)	9 April 2013	13 September 2022	9 years, 157 days	Jubilee
12		Geoffrey Rigathi Gachagua (born 1965)	13 September 2022	1 November 2024	2 years, 49 days	UDA
13		Abraham Kithure Kindiki (born 1972)	1 November 2024	Incumbent	1 year, 310 days	UDA

== See also ==
- Politics of Kenya
- President of Kenya
- List of heads of state of Kenya
- Prime Minister of Kenya
- List of colonial governors and administrators of Kenya
