= President of Kenya =

Head of state and government

President of the Republic of Kenya
- Rais wa Jamhuri ya Kenya
- Current presidential pennant

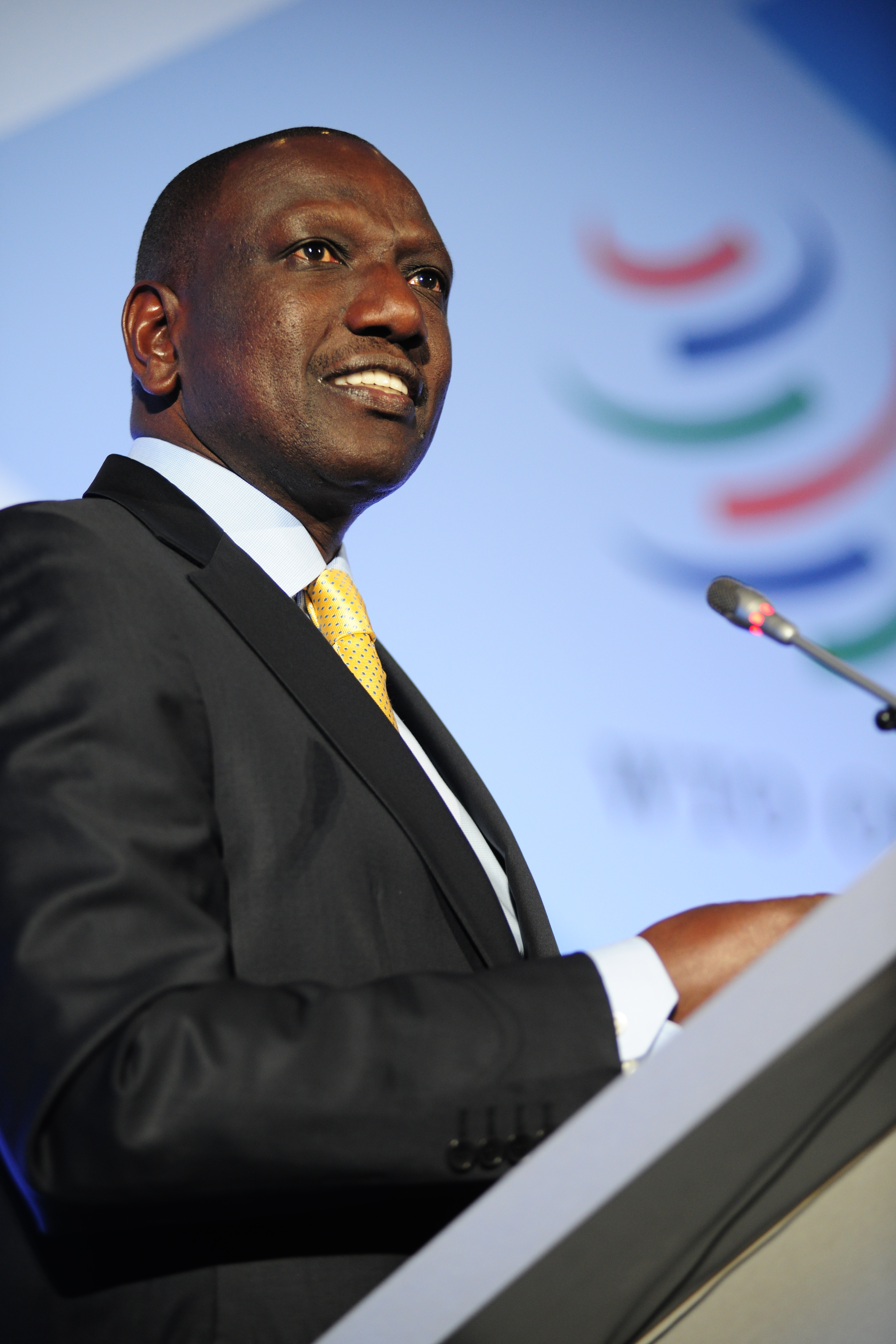
- Incumbent; William Ruto since 13 September 2022
- Government of Kenya
- Style: Mr President (informal, more widely used); The Most Excellent, His Excellency (formal, in diplomatic correspondence); The Most Honourable (alternative formal, courtesy)
- Type: Head of state; Head of government; Executive president; Supreme commander-in-chief of the Armed Forces
- Residence: State House (official, residential); State House, Mombasa (summer residence, alternative); State House, Nakuru (ceremonial, rarely used)
- Seat: Nairobi
- Appointer: Direct popular vote or via succession from deputy presidency
- Term length: Five years, renewable once
- Constituting instrument: Constitution of Kenya (2010)
- Precursor: Governor-General of Kenya; Queen of Kenya
- Inaugural holder: Jomo Kenyatta
- Formation: 12 December 1964; 61 years ago
- Deputy: Deputy President of Kenya
- Website: www.president.go.ke

The president of the Republic of Kenya (Swahili: Rais wa Jamhuri ya Kenya) is the head of state and head of government of the Republic of Kenya. The president is also the head of the executive branch of the Government of Kenya and is the commander-in-chief of the Kenya Defence Forces. The country's current president is William Ruto since 13 September 2022.

== History ==
On 12 December 1964, the Republic of Kenya was proclaimed and Jomo Kenyatta became Kenya's first president.

Kenya has had a total of five presidents since establishment, in successive order: Jomo Kenyatta, Daniel arap Moi, Mwai Kibaki, Uhuru Kenyatta, and the incumbent, William Ruto, who was inaugurated on 13 September 2022. Moi remains the country's longest serving president, having served for a total of 24 years.

== Qualifications and election to office ==
According to the current Constitution, if a person wishes to be elected as president, the following qualifications must be met:

1. Should be a Kenyan citizen by birth;
2. Should be qualified for election as a Member of Parliament;
3. Should have been nominated by a political party to stand as its candidate for the presidency, or they may stand as an independent candidate; and
4. The person should have been nominated by more than two thousand voters from each of a majority of the country's 47 counties.

A candidate will be disqualified to run for presidency if they have allegiance to a foreign state or is working for the government in any capacity as a public officer. Being a public officer is not applicable to the incumbent president if running for a second term.

The president is elected by popular vote in the general election held in the month of August every five years. For a presidential candidate to be declared the winner, they must have:

1. More than half of the total votes cast in the election; and
2. At least 25% of the votes cast in each of more than half of the 47 counties in the country.

The official residence of the president of Kenya is State House, Nairobi.

The wife of the president is referred to as the first lady of Kenya.

== Inauguration and oath of office ==
The President-elect must take and subscribe the oaths before assuming the functions of the presidency and receiving the instruments of power. Both oaths are mandated by the Third Schedule of the Constitution of Kenya. The president is sworn in by the Chief Registrar in the presence of the Chief Justice in a public ceremony in Nairobi. The day of the swearing in is a public holiday.

The elect first takes the Oath of Allegiance:

I, (name), in full realisation of the high calling I assume as President/Acting President of the Republic of Kenya, do swear/solemnly affirm that I will be faithful and bear true allegiance to the Republic of Kenya; that I will obey, preserve, protect and defend this Constitution of Kenya, as by law established, and all other laws of the Republic; and that I will protect and uphold the sovereignty, integrity and dignity of the people of Kenya. So help me God.

It's followed immediately by the Oath of Due Execution of Office:

I, (name), swear/solemnly affirm that I will truly and diligently serve the people and the Republic of Kenya in the office of the President/ Acting President of the Republic of Kenya; that I will diligently discharge my duties and perform my functions in the Office of President/Acting President of the Republic of Kenya; and I will do justice to all in accordance with this Constitution, as by law established, and the laws of Kenya, without fear, favour, affection or ill-will. So help me God.

After both oaths are taken and signed, the inaugurated president receives the Constitution and the Presidential Ceremonial Sword (sometimes called the Sword of Power) from the outgoing president.

Swearing must take place between 10:00 am and 2:00 pm as mandated by Section 14(2) of the Assumption of the Office of President Act.

== Term of office ==
A president is eligible for two consecutive terms of five years each, starting from the date the president is sworn in.

== Roles and responsibilities ==
The following is a summary of the roles of the president of Kenya as provided in the Constitution of Kenya:

- Is the country's head of state and government.
- Exercises the country's executive authority.
- Is the commander-in-chief of the country's military, the Kenya Defence Forces.
- Is the chairperson of the country's National Security Council.
- Is a symbol of national unity.

The responsibilities of the president are summarised as follows:

- Is responsible for addressing each newly elected Parliament and report once to special parliamentary seating concerning issues of national value and governance.
- Holds nominating and appointing authority, with Parliament's approval, over the country's cabinet secretaries, attorney-general, principal secretaries, diplomatic and consular representatives and any other public officer over whom the Constitution grants said authority.
- Is the chairperson of Cabinet meetings and oversees the running of operations in various ministries and government departments.
- The president may also undertake any other executive functions as permitted by the Constitution.
- The president also exercises the power of mercy, whereupon the president may pardon a person convicted of an offence.

Additionally, a person serving as president has legal immunity, with the exception of crimes under treaties to which Kenya is party with provisions that prohibit such immunity.

== Presidential standards ==
As with most other countries, the president of Kenya has a presidential standard to signify their status as the country's head of state and government. Its design is generally based on the country's national flag, although the president has some leeway to customise its appearance. The flag is generally displayed in notable locations associated with the president, usually alongside the national flag, such as the president's offices and the president's official state car, and during notable state occasions.

The presidential standards of Kenya's presidents since the country's independence have been as follows:

First Presidential Standard of Kenya (1963–1970)

Presidential Standard of Jomo Kenyatta (1963–1978)

Presidential Standard of Daniel Arap Moi (1978–2002)

Presidential Standard of Mwai Kibaki (2002–2013)

Presidential Standard of Uhuru Kenyatta (2013–2022)

Presidential Standard of William Ruto (2022–)
- Lists of incumbents
- Politics of Kenya
- Prime Minister of Kenya
