= Kenya Navy Band =

The Kenya Navy Band is the sole musical unit in the Kenya Navy and one of three state-sponsored military bands in the Kenya Defence Forces.

In December 1986, a group of 15 PUTs (Privates Under Training) from the Naval Training School in Mombasa were nominated to form a Naval Corps of Drums, with then-Corporal Mwanzia, acting as the first Drum Major. He would serve for the next 14 years as the drum major of the band until 2000. The group then underwent a 1-year percussionists course at the Kenya Army School of Music at Lang'ata Army Barracks near Nairobi. After their training, they were transferred to the Mtongwe Naval Base and took up their roles as the Kenya Navy Corps of Drums. In January 1999, another 27 more PUTs were nominated to join the band as regular musicians, undergoing a basic Music Course at the School of Music, which was completed in 2000. In 2018, the band gained attention when sexual assault claims came from a former bandsmen who claimed that 11 year prior in 2007, he was fired for refusing to have sex with a male senior officer.

The band wears a distinctive white bearskin based on the one that is used by the Royal Scots Dragoon Guards of the British Army. The band's official motto is "Give way, the indomitable ones in white are coming". The Kenya Navy Band is currently led by Director of Music, Major Henry Ochieng.

== Events ==
The band has participated in major national events, notably the Jamhuri Day Trooping of the Colour parade, the Heroes' Day ceremony and the Mashujaa Day (formerly Kenyatta Day) festivities. The now 42-member band has traveled to the Nyeri ASK Show Ground for the Madaraka Day celebrations and has also performed during the Africa Military Games 2002 at the Moi International Sports Centre. In September 2019, the Kenya Navy Band led a procession of officials from the Agricultural Society of Kenya from Mombasa in preparation of the Mombasa International Trade Fair, marching from a market to an Anglican Church where a thanksgiving ceremony was held. At the 2015 Nairobi international trade fair, the band was presented with an award by President Uhuru Kenyatta for winning an award for the best brass band. On a smaller scale, the band regularly performs during state arrival ceremonies at State House as well as passing out parades for naval cadets.

== See also ==
- Kenya Army Band
- Maroon Commandos
- Ghana Armed Forces Central Band
- Ethiopian National Defence Force Band
- Bands of the South African National Defence Force
