= Kenya Army Band =

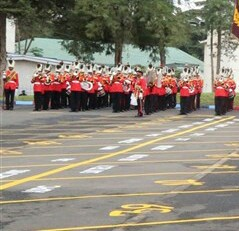
The band in 2018

The Kenya Army Band is the primary military musical unit in the Kenya Army and by extension Kenya Defence Forces. From independence it was the only band in the Kenya Defence Forces until 1985, when the Kenya Air Force Band was formed, and 1999, when the Kenya Navy Band was formed. All members of the band also play their primary role as members of the Infantry Branch, with many having been deployed on various peacekeeping missions, such as to Somalia and South Sudan.

== History ==
The band was founded shortly after Kenya gained its independence from the United Kingdom in 1963 as the successor the Band of the King's African Rifles of East Africa, formed in 1930. The first indigenous bandmaster was Yahya Mohamed after being promoted to the rank of WOI (Warrant Officer First Class). He was appointed to head the band of the then-Nyasaland. After independence, the band changed its name to Kenya Band, and later to Kenya Army Band.

1968 saw the first African commissioned officer taking over the leadership of the Band, Major Samson Kisina Nthiwason.

On 11 August 2018, the band was upgraded to a full unit and handed a unit flag at their base in Langata.

On 29 July 2022, the official band headquarters was opened by President Uhuru Kenyatta.

== Operations ==
Upon enlistment the new members are sent to the Defence Forces School of Music (formerly Kenya Army School of Music) for a 44 week basic course. It takes at least five years before a musician is considered a principal performer with the band.

It is currently based in Lang'ata Army Barracks, having moved from its original station in Nanyuki, Nairobi. The barracks is also home to DEFSOM and the Maroon Commandos. It is currently organized into two bands, Kenya Army Band A and B respectively.

=== Uniform ===
The band wears a distinctive white and black monkey bearskin, whose pattern is based on the one used by the Royal Scots Dragoon Guards of the British Army. The SCOTS DG bearskin was originally a gift to the Scots from Tsar Nicholas II of Russia while he was colonel of the regiment.

== Events ==
The band performs at a range of events, including:

- Public holidays
  - Madaraka Day
  - Mashujaa Day (formerly Kenyatta Day)
  - Jamhuri Day
- Commemorations
  - Remembrance Day services
- Beating retreats and sunset ceremonies
- Military tattoos
- Military parades

In 1980, the band took part in the centenary of the Royal Tournament.

=== Jamhuri Day ===
The Trooping of the Colour of the Kenya Defence Forces takes place every Jamhuri Day. During the ceremony, the band plays a slow march, followed by a quick march, with the lone drummer then breaking away to take his position beside number one guard to play the drummer's call, signalling the officers of No.1 Guard to take positions to receive the colour. As part of the massed KDF band, the army band performs the chosen Kenyan tunes for the parade. After the first verse of the "Ee Mungu Nguvu Yetu" is played, the band performs the tune of the British grenadier guards during the trooping, followed by the first tune of the parade that is always "By Land and Sea".

=== State opening of parliament and state visits ===
The two main events the band participates in where a guard of honour from the Kenya Army Infantry is mounted include state visits and the State Opening of Parliament. For the former, the band performs the national anthems of both the visiting country and Kenya. The band then plays a slow march during the inspection of the guard and martial music for a pass-out parade for the guest of honour. During the opening of parliament, the band performs the general salute for the President of Kenya, who then undergoes a similar procedure to visiting dignitaries during state visits, with the band performing the same protocol music (save for the martial music).

== Notable members ==
- Colonel Simon Tipatet, longtime director of the band
- Colonel Martin Makadia, Senior Director of Music, graduate of the Royal Military School of Music at Kneller Hall
- Lieutenant Colonel Nicodemus Wasomi, former director of the band, recipient of the Moran of the Order of the Burning Spear He died in November 2019 in Nairobi.
- WOI Ken Makokha, former popular radio presenter, instructor at the Defense Forces School of Music based in Lang'ata, Nairobi

== See also ==
- Kenya Navy Band
- Maroon Commandos
