= Kenya Air Force Band =

Kenyan military band

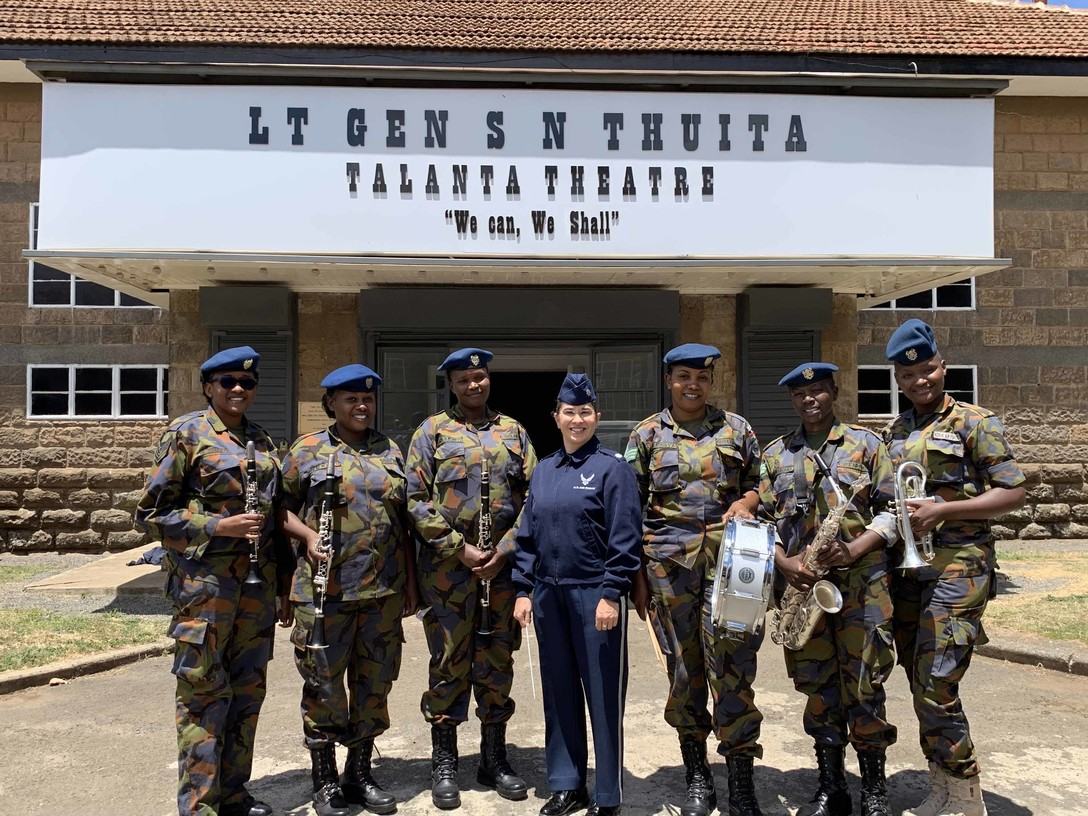
Six female members of the Air Force Band with Lieutenant Colonel Cristina Moore Urrutia of the United States Air Forces in Europe Band in 2019.

The Kenya Air Force Band is the sole musical unit in the Kenya Navy and one of three state-sponsored military bands in the Kenya Defence Forces.

The band was founded in the mid-1960s, shortly after the Republic of Kenya was established out of the former Kenya Colony of the British Empire. The band participates in major national events such as the Jamhuri Day Trooping of the Colour parade and Heroes' Day. It also performs during state visit arrival ceremonies at State House for foreign leaders. In these visits, the band has received prominent heads of state such as US President Barack Obama, Namibian President Hage Geingob and Mozambique President Filipe Nyusi. It also takes part in smaller scale events such as the DEFABA CDF cup and the aircraft. The band wears a distinctive black monkey bearskin based on the one that is used by the Royal Scots Dragoon Guards of the British Army. An associated band called the Kenya Air Force Pipe Band was founded in early 1971 at what was formerly RAF Eastleigh.

== See also ==
- Kenya Army Band
- Central Band of the Royal Air Force
- Ghana Armed Forces Central Band
- Bands of the South African National Defence Force
