= Bands of the Uganda People's Defence Force =

British band of the Uganda People's Defence Force

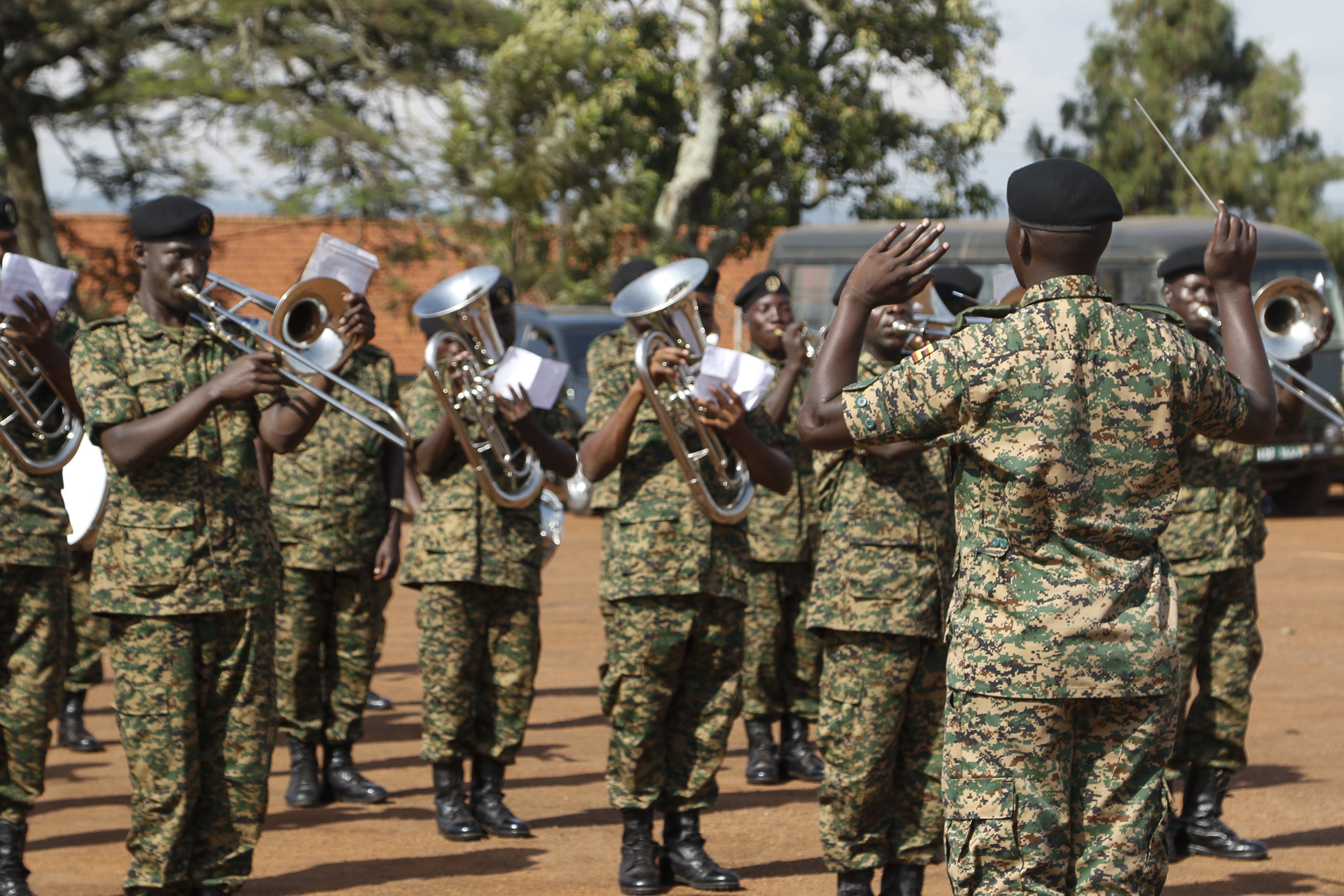
Photo of the Uganda People's Defence Forces playing band instruments

Bands of the Uganda People's Defence Force (UPDF) are maintained in accordance with British traditions. All three services (the Land and Air Forces as well as the Special Forces Command) have their own military bands. It holds British Army traditions that date back to the Band of the King's African Rifles in the Uganda Protectorate.

== Colonial era ==
The colonial era Band of the 4th Battalion, KAR was the regional military band for British Uganda. It was known for wearing traditional Scottish attire such as kilts on parade alongside the standard khaki drill fabric and tall fezzes as headgear. Based in Bombo, many members of the band took part in the Burma campaign during the Second World War. The Kabaka of Buganda also maintained military bands in his personal military forces, going off of the British model as well.

== Military bands under Amin ==
Military bands under President Idi Amin grew under his leadership and with his approval. Amin particularly grew to appreciate the composition of praise songs by these bands. This gave him cause to create a military band in every major military barracks across the country.

These bands include:

- Simba Airborne Jazz Band (Mbarara)
- Suicide Revolutionary Jazz Band (Masaka)
- Bombo Barracks Band
- Tiger Army Band (Mubende)
- Military Police Band (Making)
- EKO Jazz Band (Moroto)
- Masindi Army Jazz Band (Masindi)
- Malire Army Jazzy Band (Lubiri)
- Headquarter Army Jazz Band (Bugolobi)
- Uganda Air Force Jazz Band (Entebbe)
- Eagle Jazz Band (Jinja)

All of these were independent of the police and prisons bands. Sarah Kyolaba, the fifth and last wife of Amin, was a member of the Revolutionary Suicide Band as a dancer. Kyolaba earned the nickname "Suicide Sarah" by her bandmates, who all served in the Mechanised Regiment.

== Standard repertoire of bands ==
- Oh Uganda, Land of Beauty (National anthem)
- EAC Anthem (East African Community anthem)
- Moto Wa Waka (Anthem of the UPDF)
- The Garb of Old Gaul (Slow march during parades and inspections)
- The Grenadiers' Slow March (During the Trooping the Colour on Independence Day)

== Army Band ==
The band is based in Bombo, just outside of the capital of Kampala. Consisting of 42 members, it is the chief band of the country. It performs at military parades, national ceremonies and during official state visits of foreign leaders. The band has often been controversial its choice of music. During the visit of Kenyan President Uhuru Kenyatta to Kampala, the band stirred controversy when it played Kanu Yajenga Nchi, a song praising the Kenya African National Union, which is associated with the authoritarian rule of Daniel Arap Moi. In March 2015, advisors from British Corps of Army Music took a 10-day tour of Uganda in which it trained troops of the UPDF Brass Band. The band has also trained musicians from neighboring African states such as Rwanda. In 2009, the band conducted training at the Rwanda Military Academy in Nyakinama.

Today, military bands outside the mainstream include the UPDF's 4th Division Brass Band.

== Air Force Band ==
The Air Force Band is the official representative band of the Uganda People's Air Defence Forces. It is currently based at Katabi Barracks in Entebbe. The Uganda Air Force Jazz Band was an ensemble of the band and one of the most notable of the bands created under the Amin government. It participated in FESTAC 77 in the Nigerian city of Lagos among other regional visits. The album Uganda Souvenir was the only LP the band ever produced, having a total of 20 songs. Others that were released were single records. Notable members of the band included Bonny Kyambadde, Simon Kaate Nsubuga, and Fred Kanyike.

== Special Forces Band ==
The Special Forces Command Band the official service band of the country's Special Operations Command. On 18 June 2018, training began for over 40 soldiers of the SFC Directorate of Band to form a new musical unit. This was intended on making all three service branches self-reliant in terms of musical accompaniment. Much of the training was provided by its associated band from the Uganda People's Defence Air Forces. The soldiers were trained in music theory, orchestration and aural. On 5 July 2019 a graduation day in honor of the band was held at Sera Kasenyi Training School in the Wakiso District. Congratulatuons were made by the representative of the SFC Commander James Birungyi and the UPDF deputy spokesperson. It is one of the few bands in the world that are attached to a special forces unit.

== See also ==
- Uganda Police Band
- Kenya Army Band
- Royal Air Force Music Services
- Russian military bands
- United States military bands
- Bands of the South African National Defence Force
