= Band of the King's African Rifles =

British Army music unit

The Band of the King's African Rifles was the primary British Army musical unit in the East Africa Protectorate (also known as British East Africa) until most of its constituent regions, such as the Kenya Colony, gained their independence from the United Kingdom in the 1960s. The regimental band of the King's African Rifles, it was the largest and longest-lived King's African Rifles band, expanding during the inter-war years to 40 musicians. It released one major album, Ngoma/Amparito Roca.

== History ==
The predecessor regiments to the King's African Rifles all contained fife and drum bands that were amalgamated when it was formed in January 1902. It became a full brass ensemble in 1906, with most of the musicians consisting of recruits, and former buglers with the Central African Rifles. It was located in Nyasaland (now Malawi) while most of its performances were in Zomba and Blantyre. At the end of the First World War, the King's African Rifles’s regular Battalions established bands throughout the Central and East African colonies.

On New Year's Day in 1912, the band was officially dismantled as a result of economic hardships. By 1 April 1919, only the 3rd King's African Rifles Band in Kenya Colony was given official sanction by the army, all while the 6th battalion band in Tanganyika was rejected in its similar request. With consent of the Colonial Office, the 6th King's African Rifles Band was officially formed and made its first public appearance at an event in Dar es Salaam in July 1920. It drew its band personnel from two main sources: former Askari marching bands that served under German East African administration in the Schutztruppe and the former drum and bugle band of the 6th King's African Rifles that was dismantled in 1910.

The bands of the 1st and 2nd Battalions descended from the Central African and the East Africa Rifles respectively. In 1930, the Band of the King's African Rifles of East Africa were formed. Later in the decade the 6th King's African Rifles Band was dissolved only to be reformed in 1937. During the Second World War, many band members joined entertainment units that served in the colony of Burma during the Burma campaign. The band of the 4th battalion from Bombo was known for wearing highland dress during military parades and public functions. The combined band visited Edinburgh Castle in Scotland in June 1946. The 3rd King's African Rifles Band was eventually replaced in the Republic of Kenya by the Kenya Army Band.

== See also ==
- Kenya Navy Band
- Maroon Commandos
- Band of the West Indies Regiment
- Armed Forces of Malta Band
