= State Presidents Guard =

State President‘s Guard Staatspresidentswag
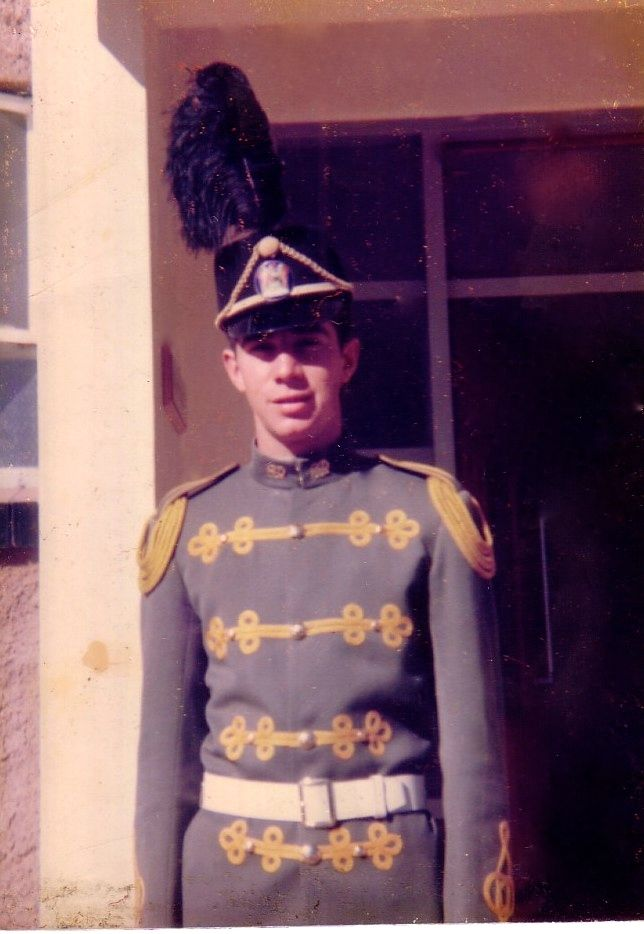
- State President's Guard guardsman in full dress. Note the plumed shako and the tunic resembling that worn by the State Artillery of the former South African Republic (ZAR).
- Active: 1967 – 1990
- Country: South Africa
- Allegiance: State President of South Africa
- Branch: South African Army
- Type: Honour Guards
- Role: Ceremonial Duties
- Garrison/HQ: Pretoria
- Motto: Ex Unitate Vires (From unity - strength)

Insignia
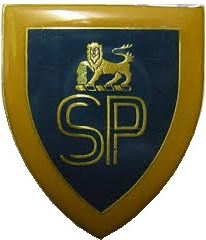
- Unit flash of the State President's Guard

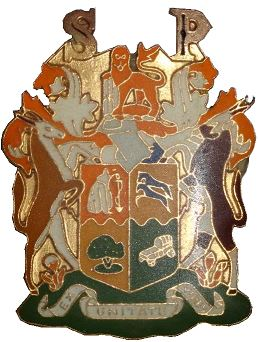
- Cap badge of the State President's Unit

External videos
- State President's Unit 1988

The State President's Guard (Staatspresidentswag) was the name of the ceremonial unit of the South African Defence Force (SADF) from 1967 to 1990.

During that time, it was the guard unit for the South African State President and guard of honour at ceremonial occasions. Renamed the State President's Unit (Staatspresidentseenheid) in 1985, it was disbanded in July 1990.

== History ==
The origins of the State President's Guard (later the State President's Unit) trace back to the State Artillery Corps (Staatsartillerie) of the erstwhile Zuid-Afrikaansche Republiek, influenced, too, by British and other European traditions.

On the occasion of the fifth anniversary on 31 May 1966 of the creation of the Republic of South Africa, a plea was made to the then Minister of Defence and the Commandant-General of the Defence Force for the creation of a ceremonial unit within the South African Defence Force (SADF), to add lustre to the office of the State President. The intention was that a unit with its own ceremonial uniform would act as the ceremonial guard of the State President and would perform ceremonial duties at all official state occasions.

As the first State President of the Republic of South Africa, Charles Robberts Swart, was due to retire on 31 May 1967, and his successor, Dr T. E. Donges, was to be sworn in on the same day, it was agreed that the newly-inaugurated guard would appear in public on the same day, at Donges’ inauguration.

The new unit was established officially on 1 May 1967 and an effort was made to train the specially-selected servicemen who would form the guard of honour at Donges' inauguration. Special uniforms were manufactured - including a plumed shako with the presidential emblem (the national coat of arms with the letters 'SP' above). The initial uniform evolved from historical Boer Republic designs, with variations reflecting military traditions and practical needs.

However, due to Dr Donges' illness, the Guard was only able to make its first public appearance eight months later at his state funeral.

Including the state funerals of the first State President, Swart (in 1982), and that of the State President-elect, Donges, in 1968, the State President's Guard served all the States President of the Republic of South Africa from 1967 until 1990.

On 1 December 1985, State President P. W. Botha changed the name of the unit to the 'State President's Unit' (Staatspresidentseenheid). On 30 January 1986, the ceremonial uniform was changed to a more modern, Kalahari sand tunic, off-white shirt, khaki tie, orange-white-blue belt, khaki trousers (that included an orange-white-blue vertical stripe), and a white, spiked pith helmet.

The unit was disbanded in July 1990.

In 1996, the National Ceremonial Guard (NCG) of the South African National Defence Force (SANDF) was formed, to add lustre to ceremonial occasions of the now democratic South Africa. However, the NCG is a separate entity to the SP Unit.

== Function ==
The most important ceremonial function of the State President's Guard (later the State President's Unit) was that of guard of honour at ceremonial occasions.

Appearances of the SP Guard / Unit in this capacity from 1967-1990 included the following:

- The inauguration ceremonies of State Presidents of South Africa from J. J. Fouche in 1968 until F. W. de Klerk in 1989.
- Visits from foreign heads of state, as well as other eminent foreign visitors.
- Performances at the state funerals of States President and at certain other military funerals.
- Annual Opening of Parliament Parade.

Notably, Alpha Company of the State President's Unit provided the ceremonial guard at the Opening of Parliament Parade in Cape Town on 2 February 1990. Minutes later, President F. W. de Klerk announced significant reforms, including the unbanning of the African National Congress (ANC) and other anti-apartheid organisations, and the release of political prisoners, including Nelson Mandela.

Regular performances by the SP Guard / Unit also took place at occasions when foreign ambassadors presented their credentials to the State President. Other appearances were when the then-homelands gained 'independence'. In addition, the State President's Guard / Unit also performed at the official arrival and departure of the State President from various cities, especially those cities in which his official residences were situated.

The SP Guard / Unit was also responsible for a weekly changing of the guard parade on Fridays at Tuynhuys in Cape Town while the Parliament was in session. At the end of each month, a retreat ceremony was held by the unit at a public venue. Similar parades were held at Cape Town Castle, Grand Parade in Cape Town and at the Union Buildings in Pretoria.

In addition to acting as a ceremonial guard for the State President during official events such as inaugurations, state funerals and parliamentary openings, the SP Guard / Unit also provided operational support as an infantry unit, including border defense and internal security operations. The unit was tasked to do operational duty in the same way as any other infantry unit of the SADF, and in the 1980s it participated in operation 'Smokeshell' and the follow-up operation after the attack on Katima Mulilo. Shortly before the unit's deactivation in July 1990, its members were deployed in early 1990 to the then Eastern Transvaal, along the SA/Mozambique/Swaziland border and in the townships of the then homeland of Kangwane.

Members of the SP Guard / Unit were selected based on strict criteria, including physical attributes, physical fitness, bilingualism, minimum academic requirements, and a clean record.

Training included basic infantry skills, advanced weapon handling and urban warfare tactics, ensuring soldiers of the Guard / Unit were combat-ready.

== Headquarters ==
Upon its establishment on 1 May 1967, the State President's Guard was not yet an independent unit - it was to begin with attached to the Army Gymnasium in Voortrekkerhoogte, on the outskirts of Pretoria. When the Army Gymnasium moved to Heidelberg, the SP Guard was reassigned to the SA Medical Service Training Centre. Early in 1969, the unit moved to Wonderboom, in Pretoria, where it was attached to the 4th Provost Company. In September 1971, it moved to Heidelberg, and was reassigned again under the wings of the Army Gymnasium. On 10 December 1973, the SP Guard returned to Voortrekkerhoogte, where it remained until its deactivation in July 1990.

== Commanding Officers and RSMs ==
The commanding officers of the State President's Guard / Unit were -

- Cmdt J. C. Swarts (1967—1971)
- Cmdt S. J. P. K. Steenkamp (1971—1973)
- Maj C. J. Louwrens (1973—1977)
- Maj F. A. Boles (1977—1980)
- Maj J. H. Nawn (1980—1981)
- Maj H. G. de Witt (1982—1984)
- Maj P. J. de Witt (1985—1986)
- Cmdt J. F. Weilbach (1986)
- Cmdt C. V. Geldenhuys (1987-1989)
- Cmdt J. Pretorius (1989-1990)

The Regimental Sergeants-major (RSMs) were -

- WO2 C. J. Buitendach (1967—1969)
- WO1 D. J. Oosthuizen (1969—1976)
- WO2 J. M. Brand (1976—1980)
- WO2 J. D. Steyn (1980)
- WO2 W. P. Wiese (1980—1981)
- WO1 R. J. L. B. Ras (1982—1983)
- WO1 W. P. Wiese (1984—1986)
- WO1 P. R. Schutte (1987-1990)

== Deactivation and Legacy ==
The State President's Unit was deactivated on 26 July 1990, amid political changes in South Africa.

Its legacy includes contributions to military tradition and the ceremonial representation of the presidency, with a strong emphasis on discipline and honour.

The unit's history reflects the broader context of South Africa's military and political evolution during a tumultuous period.

== Symbols ==
=== Colours ===
On 28 April 1988, history was made by the State President's Unit (as it by then was), when it became the first unit in the SADF to be awarded national colours together with unit colours, in a Presentation of Colours ceremony. 'National colours' (nasionale vaandel) serve the same purpose as King's colours in the British Army as well as 'presidential colours' in India and other Commonwealth republics.

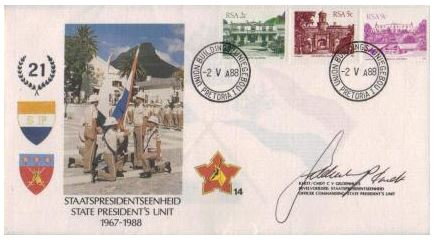
SADF State President's Guard Commemorative Letter.

=== Uniform ===
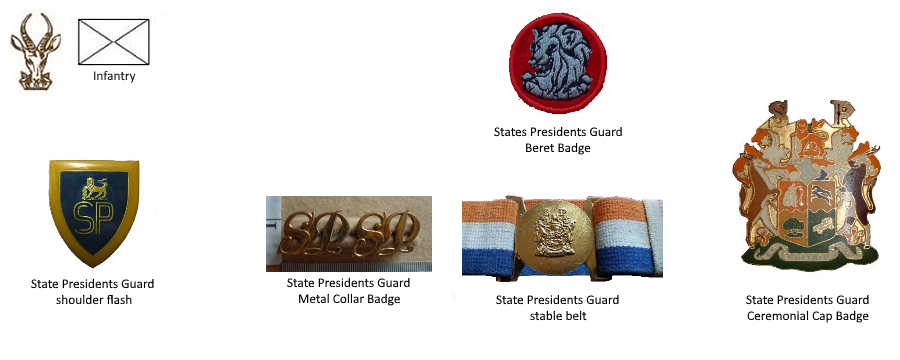
State President's Guard information card

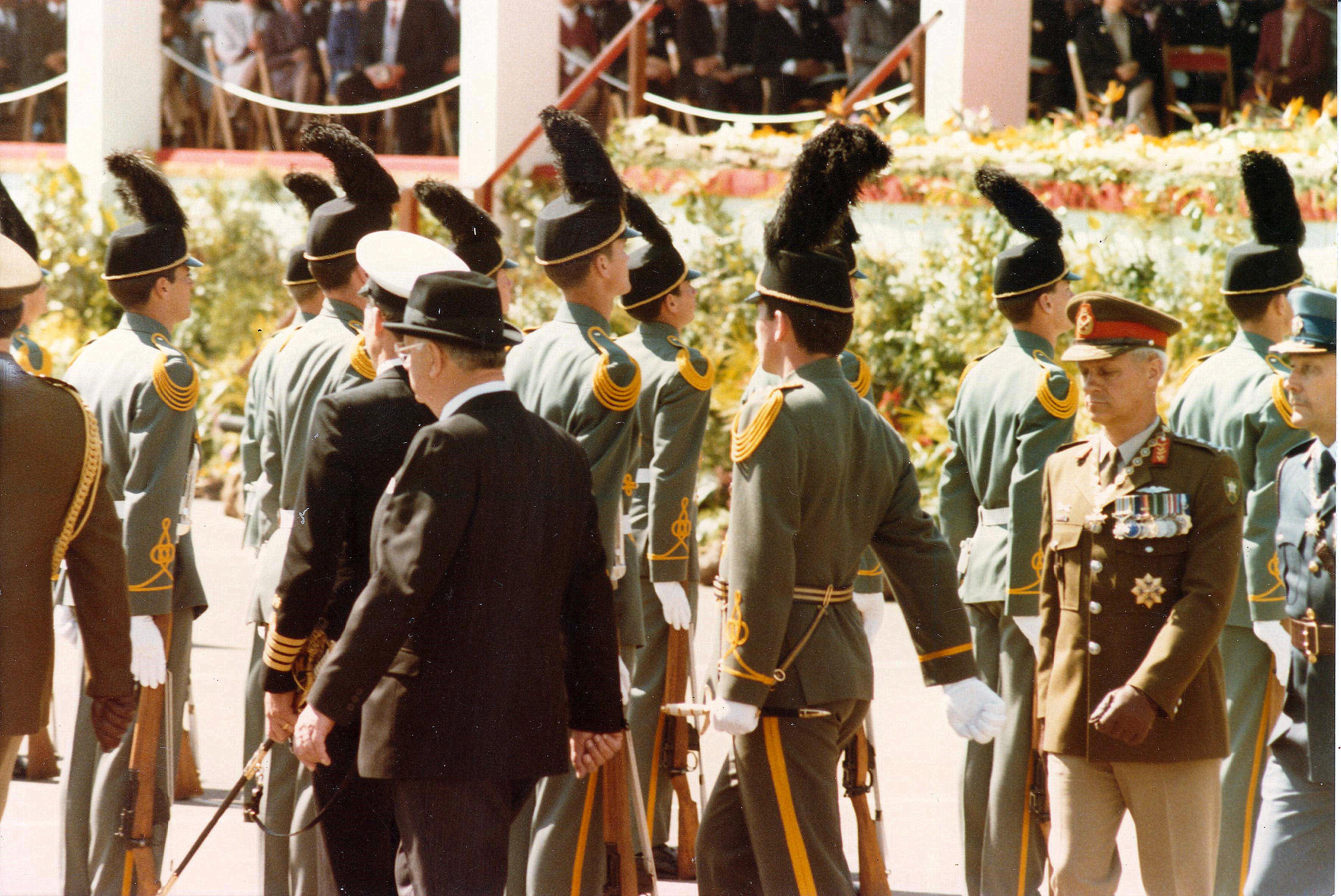
General Constand Viljoen and P.W. Botha inspect the guard of honour of the State President's Guard.

=== Insignia ===
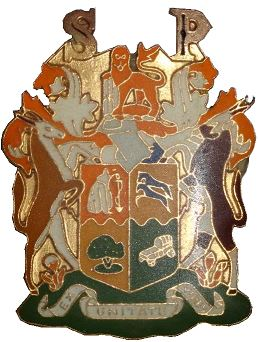
SADF State Presidents Unit cap badge, also the arms of State President

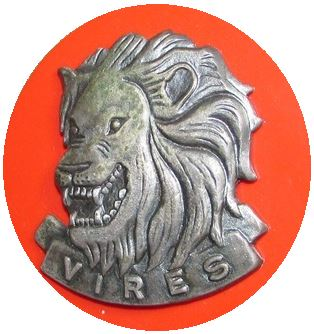
The State President's Unit was disbanded in 1990. This beret badge was used by SANDF post 1994 in large parades to ensure uniformity.

== See also ==
- State President of South Africa
- South African Army
- Guard of honour
- National Ceremonial Guard
- Bands of the South African National Defence Force
