= Public holidays in Kenya =

There are twelve nationally recognized Public holidays celebrated in the Republic of Kenya, a country in East Africa.

Public holidays in Kenya
Date	Name
1 January	New Year's Day
Varies	Good Friday
Varies	Easter Monday
1 May	Labour Day
1 June	Madaraka Day
Depends on the sighting of the moon	Eid al-Fitr
Depends on the sighting of the moon	Eid al-Adha
10 October	Mazingira Day, formerly Utamaduni Day (moved to Dec 26), formerly Huduma Day, formerly Moi Day
20 October	Mashujaa Day (Formerly Kenyatta Day). This day is usually celebrated to remember the heroes who fought for Kenya's independence.
12 December	Jamhuri Day, marks the date of Kenya's Independence on 12 December 1964.
25 December	Christmas Day
26 December	Boxing Day
