= 7 Kenya Rifles =

7th Kenya Rifles
- Active: 8 June 1968; 58 years ago
- Country: Kenya
- Branch: Kenya Army
- Type: Infantry
- Role: light infantry
- Garrison/HQ: Langata Barracks, Nairobi
- Colours: Maroon
- Engagements: Operation Linda Nchi; African Union Mission in Somalia

7 Kenya Rifles is a battalion of the Kenya Army Infantry. It came into being on June 8, 1968, at Gilgil in a British army camp which had been abandoned since 1964. The first commanding officer of the unit was Lt Col Wambua. The unit relocated to its current base at Langata in 1973. The Maroon Commandos is a military band belonging to the battalion.

== Overview ==
The battalion between 2003 and 2004 saw extensive support from the United States through training 250–450 of its personnel. The training involved field intelligence, command and control and basic maneuver and firepower. The battalion's leadership underwent the program first before transitioning as trainers to the rest of the battalion. The training cycles lasted approximately four weeks and further support in terms of equipment worth $3.8 million was provided to the battalion.

== See also ==
- Maroon Commandos
