= National Ceremonial Guard =

- Nasionale Seremoniële Wag
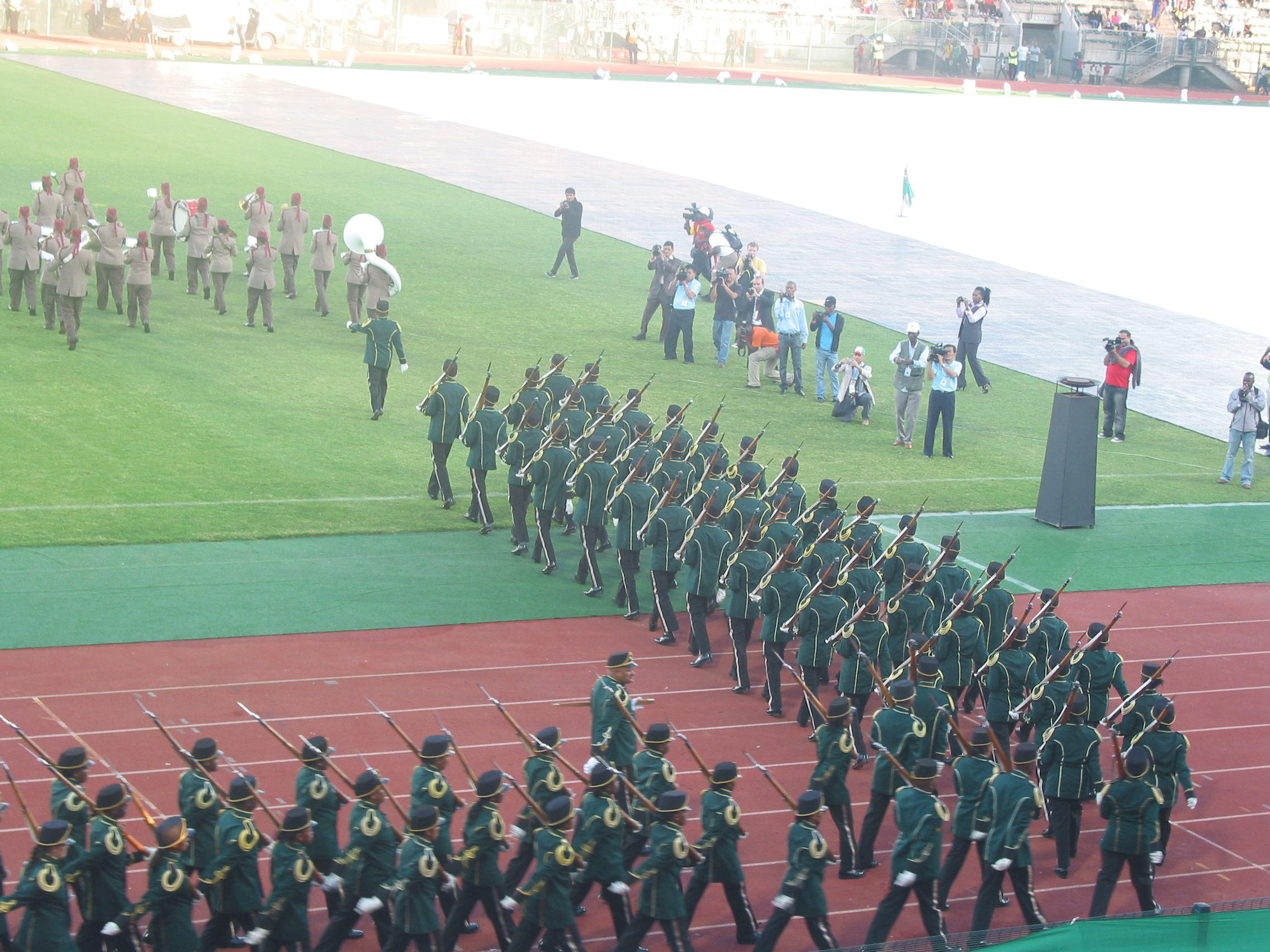
- The National Ceremonial Guard at the opening of 17th World Festival of Youth and Students.
- Active: 1996 – present
- Country: South Africa
- Branch: South African National Defence Force
- Type: Honor Guard
- Role: Ceremonial guard
- Size: 293 personnel
- Garrison/HQ: Sebokeng Military Complex, Pretoria

The National Ceremonial Guard (NCG) is an honor guard battalion of the South African National Defence Force serving during ceremonies involving the President of South Africa, Deputy President of South Africa, Minister of Defence and Military Veterans and the Chief of the South African National Defence Force. It is composed of a guard of honour, a drill team, and a military band.

== History ==
The unit was originally founded on 01 May 1967 as the State Presidents Guard when Charles Robberts Swart was the State President of South Africa. It was dissolved in 1990 ahead of the first democratic elections in 1994. The unit was rebranded in September 1996 as the National Ceremonial Guard. The NCG's old uniform of dark green tunic with black pants was reinstated after it was reestablished. In April 2008, the NCG moved into the Sebokeng Military Complex by order of the president.

== Functions ==
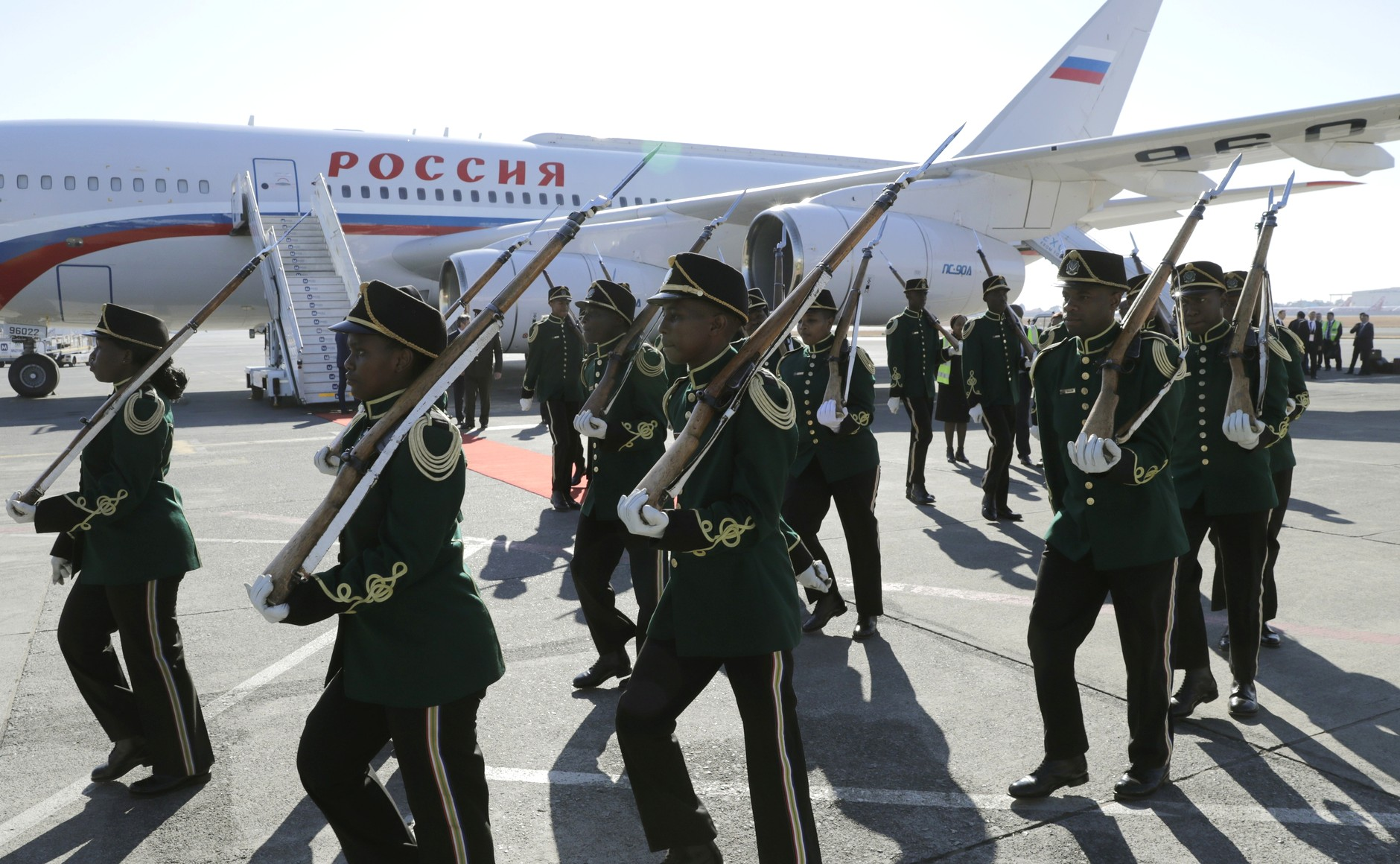
The NCG at O. R. Tambo International Airport in Johannesburg.

The NCG takes part official state functions such as the opening of Parliament, and the welcoming ceremonies of visits by international leaders and statesmen to South Africa. It also provides guards of honour at inaugurations of Presidents, state funerals and certain national monuments.

== NCG Band ==
The NCG Band is the military band unit attached to the NCG. It currently serves as the senior most band of the entire SANDF. Both the NCG and its military band have been sent to different countries to perform in military tattoos and other international events. Since 2001, the band has undertaken the role of training military bandsmen from Namibia and Botswana.

== Regalia ==
=== Insignia ===
Good Conduct Stripes
Garment with Pocket: Centred on the right pocket
Garment without Pocket: 10 millimetres (0.39 in) below the name badge
Insignia
NCG Uniform - Ceremonial Guard Green with Gold Stripes
Level 1	Level II	Level III
SANDF - Embossed Good Conduct Badge - SA Army - NCG Uniform - Ceremonial Guard Green with Gold Stripes - Level I	No Image	SANDF - Embossed Good Conduct Badge - SA Army - NCG Uniform - Ceremonial Guard Green with Gold Stripes - Level III

=== Head Dress ===
Head Dress
Cap Badge	Beret	Service Dress Cap
SANDF - INSIGNIA - SA Army - National Ceremonial Guard - Service Dress Cap Badge	SANDF - Beret - Men - SA Army - National Ceremonial Guard (NCG) - Olive Green	SANDF - Cap - SA Army - National Ceremonial Guard Uniform - Ceremonial Guard Cap

=== NCO Rank ===
NCO Service Dress Rank
Staff Sergeant	Sergeant
SANDF - INSIGNIA - Rank - NCO - SA Army - Embossed - Gold On Black - Crest In Silver - Pin On - Staff Sergeant - NCG and MD Left	SANDF - INSIGNIA - Rank - NCO - SA Army - Embossed - Gold On Black - Pin On - Sergeant - NCG and MD

NCO Service Dress Rank
Corporal	Lance Corporal
SANDF - INSIGNIA - Rank - NCO - SA Army - Embossed - Gold On Black - Pin On - Corporal - NCG and MD	SANDF - INSIGNIA - Rank - NCO - SA Army - Embossed - Gold On Black - Pin On - Lance Corporal - NCG and MD

=== Uniforms ===
Uniforms
Jacket	Trousers
SANDF - JACKET - Men - SA Army - Ceremonial Guard - Green	SANDF - TROUSERS - Men - SA Army - Ceremonial Guard - Black

== See also ==
- List of badges of the South African Army
- Bands of the South African National Defence Force
