= Sarah Kyolaba =

First Lady of Uganda

First Lady of Uganda
- In office 2 August 1975 – 11 April 1979
- President: Idi Amin
- Preceded by: Miria Obote
- Succeeded by: Hannah Lule

Personal details
- Born: 1955 Kampala, Uganda
- Died: 11 June 2015 (aged 59–60) London, England
- Cause of death: Cancer
- Spouse: Idi Amin (m. 1975; died 2003)

Sarah Kyolaba Tatu Namutebi Amin (1955 – 11 June 2015), also known by her stage name "Suicide Sarah", was a Ugandan dancer who was dictator Idi Amin's fifth and last-surviving wife. She met Amin when she was a 19-year-old go-go dancer and they married in 1975. The couple had three children, but Kyolaba left Amin after he went into exile in 1979. She moved to England where she ran a restaurant and later a hair salon. She died from cancer in 2015.

== Early life ==
Sarah Kyolaba was born in Mulago Hospital, Kampala, Uganda, in 1955 to Haji Kamadi and Aisha Nsubuga.

== Idi Amin ==
Kyolaba met Idi Amin when she was a 19-year-old go-go dancer in the so-called Revolutionary Suicide Mechanised Regiment Band of the Uganda Army. That led to her nickname, "Suicide Sarah". The couple married in Kampala in 1975 in a ceremony where Yasser Arafat was the best man. The wedding banquet was reported to have cost the equivalent of £2 million. Kyolaba was said to have been Amin's "favourite" wife.

Kyolaba had been pregnant and in a relationship with the child's father in Masaka when she met Amin. On 25 December 1974, she gave birth, and Amin had the child's birth announced on television as his own, and the real father soon disappeared.

Kyolaba went with Amin when he was forced to leave Uganda in 1979, first to Libya and then to Saudi Arabia, where they eventually settled in Jeddah. Kyolaba separated from Amin in 1982. She travelled to Germany with Faisal Wangita, Amin's son, leaving her other three children behind. Once in Germany, she claimed asylum and worked as a lingerie model, before moving to London.

== Life in London ==
Kyolaba ran Krishna's Restaurant in Upton Road, West Ham, London, from 1997 until at least 1998. The restaurant served dishes such as stewed goat, muchomo (barbecued meat with salad) and ekigere (cow hoof in gravy). It was closed down for a time in November 1997 after environmental health inspectors found cockroaches and mice in the kitchen. Kyolaba avoided jail by pleading guilty at Snaresbrook Crown Court, where she received a two-year conditional discharge and had to pay £1,000 towards the prosecution's costs.

After Amin's death in Jeddah in 2003, Kyolaba called him a "true African hero", adding, he was "a good man, a good husband, a loving father and a great grandfather." At the time of her death, she was running a hair salon in Tottenham, north London and living nearby in Palmers Green.

Their son Faisal Wangita was jailed for charges related to the murder of a Somali man in 2007.

== Death ==
Kyolaba died on 11 June 2015 in London's Royal Free Hospital. Contacts in London say she developed a large tumour and had lost a lot of blood which likely pointed to cancer as the cause of death.
