= Bearskin =

Style of tall fur cap

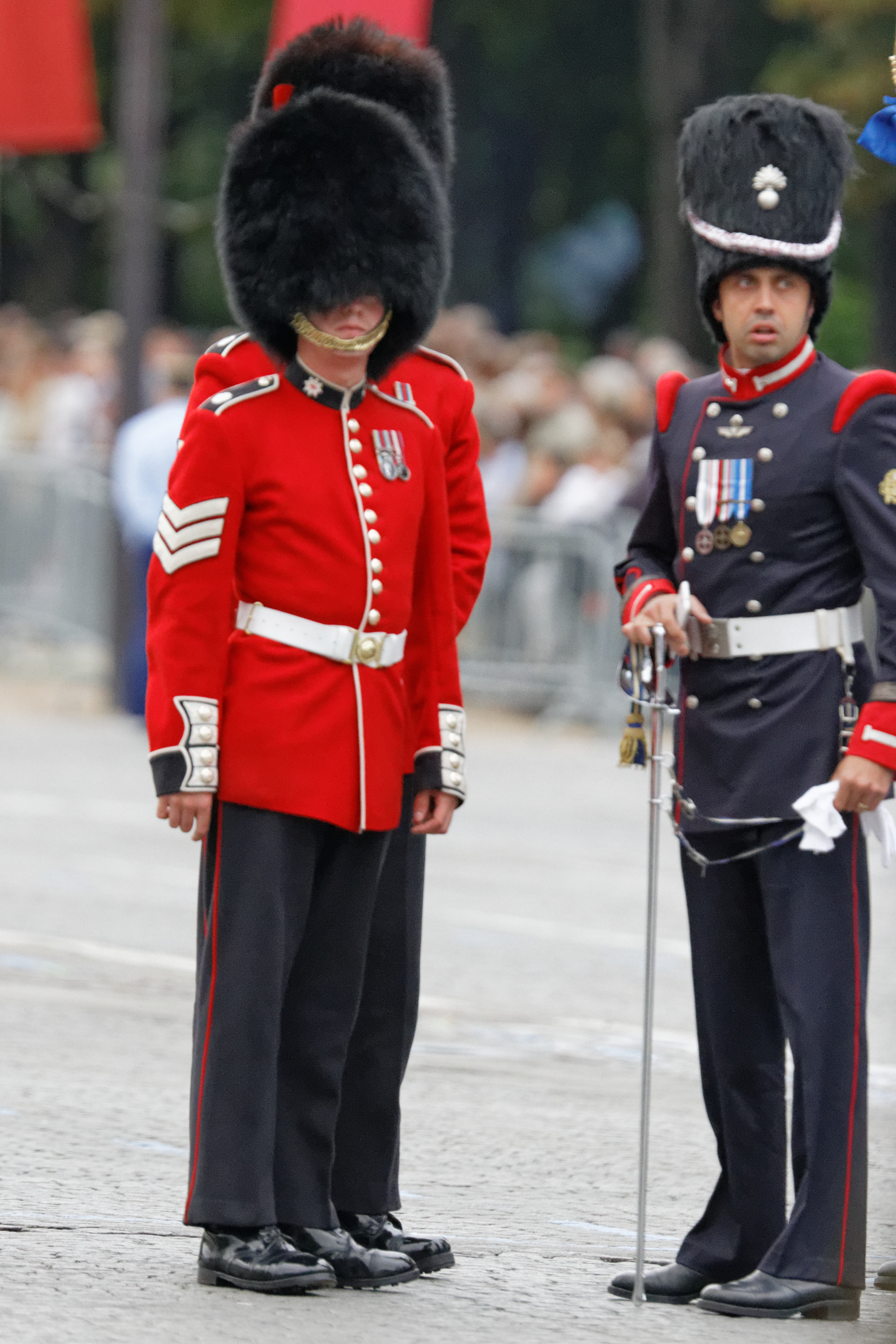
Soldiers of the British Coldstream Guard and Italian 1st Regiment "Granatieri di Sardegna" in full dress uniform wearing bearskins.

A bearskin is a tall fur cap derived from mitre caps worn by grenadier units in the 17th and 18th centuries. Initially worn by only grenadiers, bearskins were later used by several other military units in the 19th century. The bearskin cap continued to see use in battle during the mid-19th century, although by the 20th century, it was only used for parade dress. In the 21st century, the bearskin cap is retained by select military units as a prominent element of their ceremonial and full dress uniforms.

== History ==
The bearskin evolved from mitres worn by European grenadiers during the 17th and 18th centuries. During the 17th century, when grenadier units began being raised by European armies, some began wearing mitres in lieu of wide-brimmed hats to provide them with greater mobility when throwing grenades. To prevent the mitre from sagging and provide it with a more impressive appearance, mitres were frequently adorned with a metal front plate or fur. Mitres with metal front plates were first adopted by Prussian Army grenadiers and were later adopted by the grenadiers of other Protestant nations, although the trimming of mitres with fur became more prevalent in Catholic states.

A French Royal Army grenadier with a bearskin cap, 1780

The earliest record of bearskins being worn by European grenadiers was during the mid-17th century, although its widespread adoption did not take place until 1761, when French Royal Army grenadiers began wearing tall fur caps resembling the mitres worn by Prussian grenadiers. Like mitres, bearskins were worn to increase the perceived height of the wearer for psychological reasons. British Army grenadiers switched their mitres for bearskins in 1768 following the issue of royal warrant, though some regiments began wearing them beginning in the 1750s. Bearskins were famously worn by Napoleon's Imperial Guard and the British Royal Scots Greys, and the Grenadier Guards adopted the headdress after the Battle of Waterloo in 1815, with the Coldstream Guards and Scots Guards also wearing bearskins as part of their full dress uniforms by 1831.

The headdress continued to see military service during the mid-19th century, with British foot guards and the Royal Scots Greys wearing bearskins in battle during the Crimean War. However, by the mid-19th century, the expense of acquiring bearskin caps and the difficulty in maintaining them in good condition under campaign conditions led to some armies limiting the use of the headdress to specific formal occasions. Military units, like the Italian 1st Regiment "Granatieri di Sardegna", eventually discontinued the use of the headgear altogether during that century.

The British continued to use the headdress during peacetime manoeuvres until the introduction of khaki service dress in 1902. Immediately before the outbreak of World War I in 1914, bearskins were still worn by several British, Belgian, Danish, German, Russian, and Swedish units as a part of their ceremonial/parade dress. Several regiments that retired the use of the headdress during the 19th century, including units in Italy and the Netherlands, also readopted it for ceremonial use during the 20th century.

== Contemporary use ==
As of 2020, there were 14 countries whose militaries used bearskin as a part of their ceremonial uniforms. Some of these units wear bearskins made out of real bear fur, while other units use caps made out of synthetic fibres. In addition to military units, several civilian marching bands have also incorporated the bearskin cap as a part of their uniforms.

=== Australia ===
The Pipes and Drums Band of the 3rd Battalion, Royal Australian Regiment are authorised to wear a bearskin cap as a part of its ceremonial dress.

=== Belgium ===
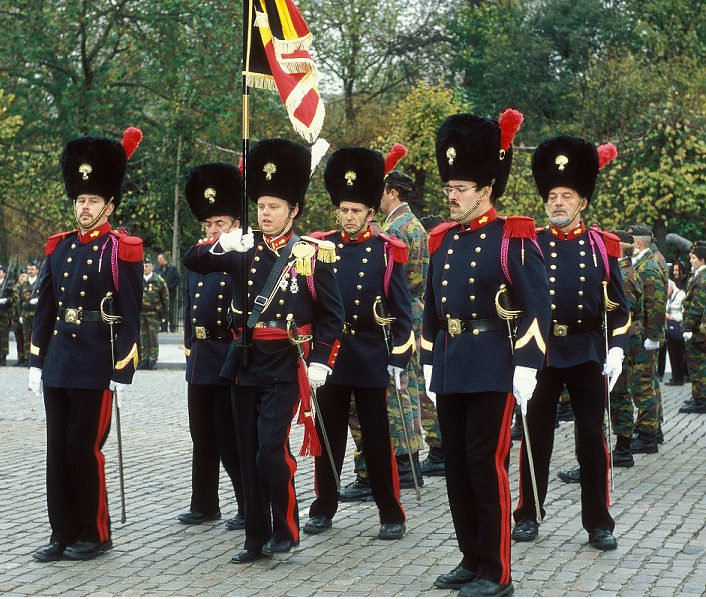
Members of the Regiment Carabiniers Prins Boudewijn – Grenadiers in parade dress with bearskins

Two units in Belgium use the bearskin cap, the Belgian Royal Escort of the Belgian Federal Police, and the Regiment Carabiniers Prins Boudewijn – Grenadiers of the Belgian Armed Forces Land Component.

The uniforms of the Belgian Royal Escort, along with their bearskin caps, date back to 1939 when the unit was part of the Belgian Gendarmerie. Modelled after the Gendarmerie's pre-1914 uniforms, the uniforms featured a 3 kilograms (6.6 lb) bearskin cap adorned with a plume. Initially, Royal Belgian Escort captains wore bearskin caps with a white plume, while other unit members had caps with a different coloured plume. However, in 1997, the design of the bearskin caps was standardized, and red plumes were used on all caps regardless of rank except for the Commander of the Escort, riding besides the King. The Royal Belgian Escort continued to wear these uniforms after the Gendarmerie was merged with other police units to form the Federal Police in 2001.

Bearskins were worn as part of the field uniform of the Régiment des Grenadiers of the Belgian Army until 1908. After that year the fur headdress was retained only for parade wear until the outbreak of war in August 1914. Its successor unit, the Regiment Carabiniers Prins Boudewijn – Grenadiers uses the headdress as a part of its ceremonial dress.

=== Canada ===
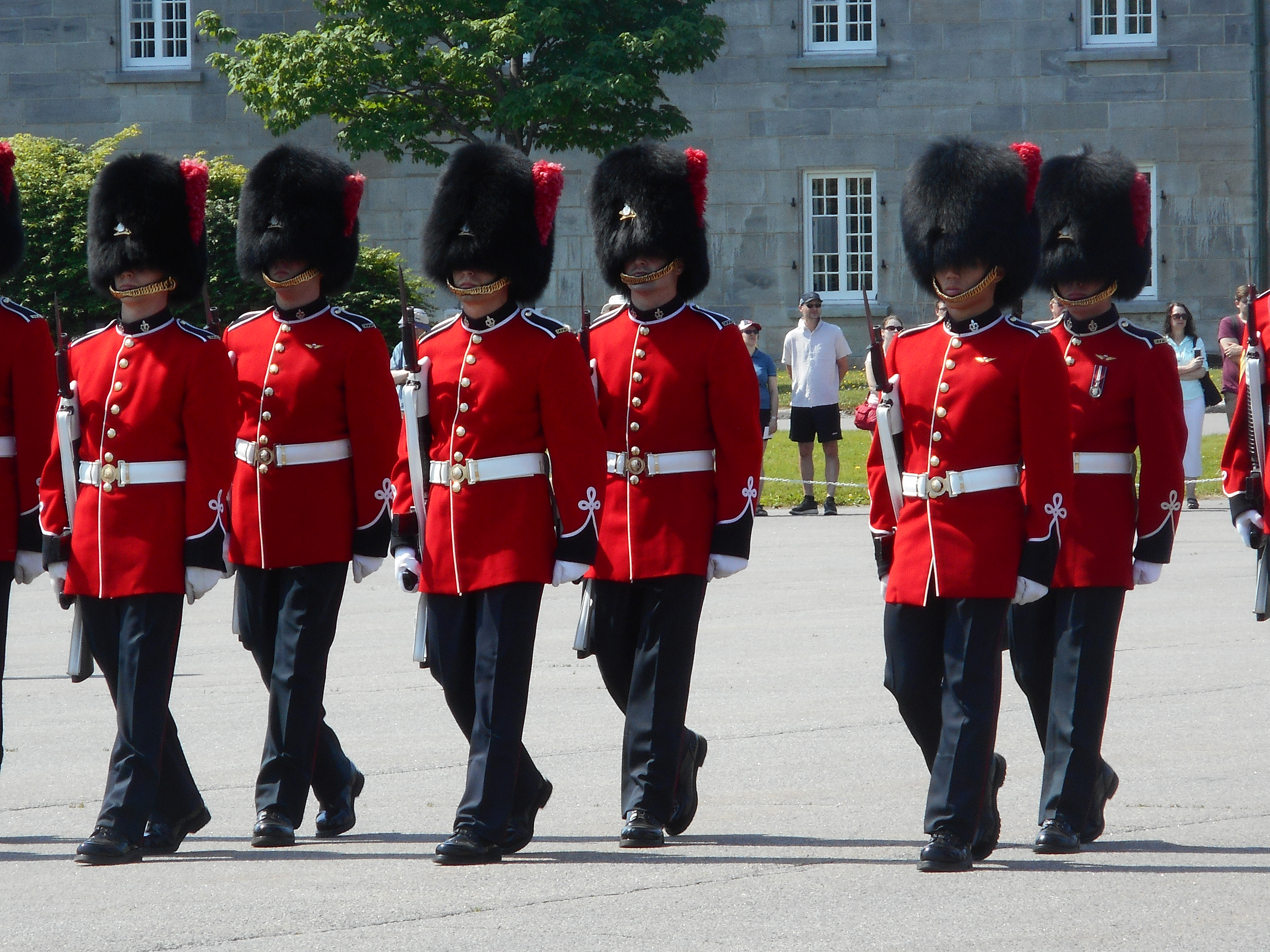
Black fur bearskins used by the Canadian Army includes a coloured plume.

The bearskin caps used by the Canadian Armed Forces are of black fur and include a coloured plume on the side of the bearskin and a gold-coloured chin strap. The materials used by Canadian bearskin caps are sourced from black bears hunted in Canada, although the Department of National Defence claims that the bearskin caps used by its units are made from bear furs that are over 20 years old.

The Canadian Forces Dress Instructions authorise the use of bearskins for all its foot guards and fusilier regiments. In addition to foot guards and fusiliers, two line infantry regiments are also authorised to wear a bearskin cap with their ceremonial full-dress uniform: the Royal 22^{e} Régiment (R22^{e}R) and the Royal Regiment of Canada (RRegtC). Usage of the bearskin cap by the R22^{e}R is attributed to its historical regimental alliance with the British Army's Royal Welch Fusiliers, while the use of bearskins by the RRegtC is attributed to the regiment's historical lineage from The Royal Grenadiers of the Canadian Militia.

Bearskins used by fusilier regiments and the R22^{e}R have their unit's cap badge at the front of the bearskin, while those of foot guards and the RRegtC do not have cap badges.

The following is a list of regiments whose members are authorised to wear a bearskin cap with their full dress uniform, along with the colour used on the unit's plume:

- The Royal 22^{e} Régiment, scarlet plume
- The Governor General's Foot Guards, scarlet plume
- The Canadian Grenadier Guards, white plume
- The Royal Regiment of Canada, scarlet over white plume
- Les Fusiliers du S^{t}-Laurent, white plume
- Les Fusiliers Mont-Royal, white plume
- The Princess Louise Fusiliers, grey plume (Note: The unit is authorised to use either the bearskin cap or a Wolseley helmet along with their full dress. Members typically wear the Wolseley helmet when in full dress.)
- Les Fusiliers de Sherbrooke, white plume

In addition to these units, the drum major of the Royal Highland Fusiliers of Canada's pipe band are also authorised to wear the bearskin.

=== Denmark ===
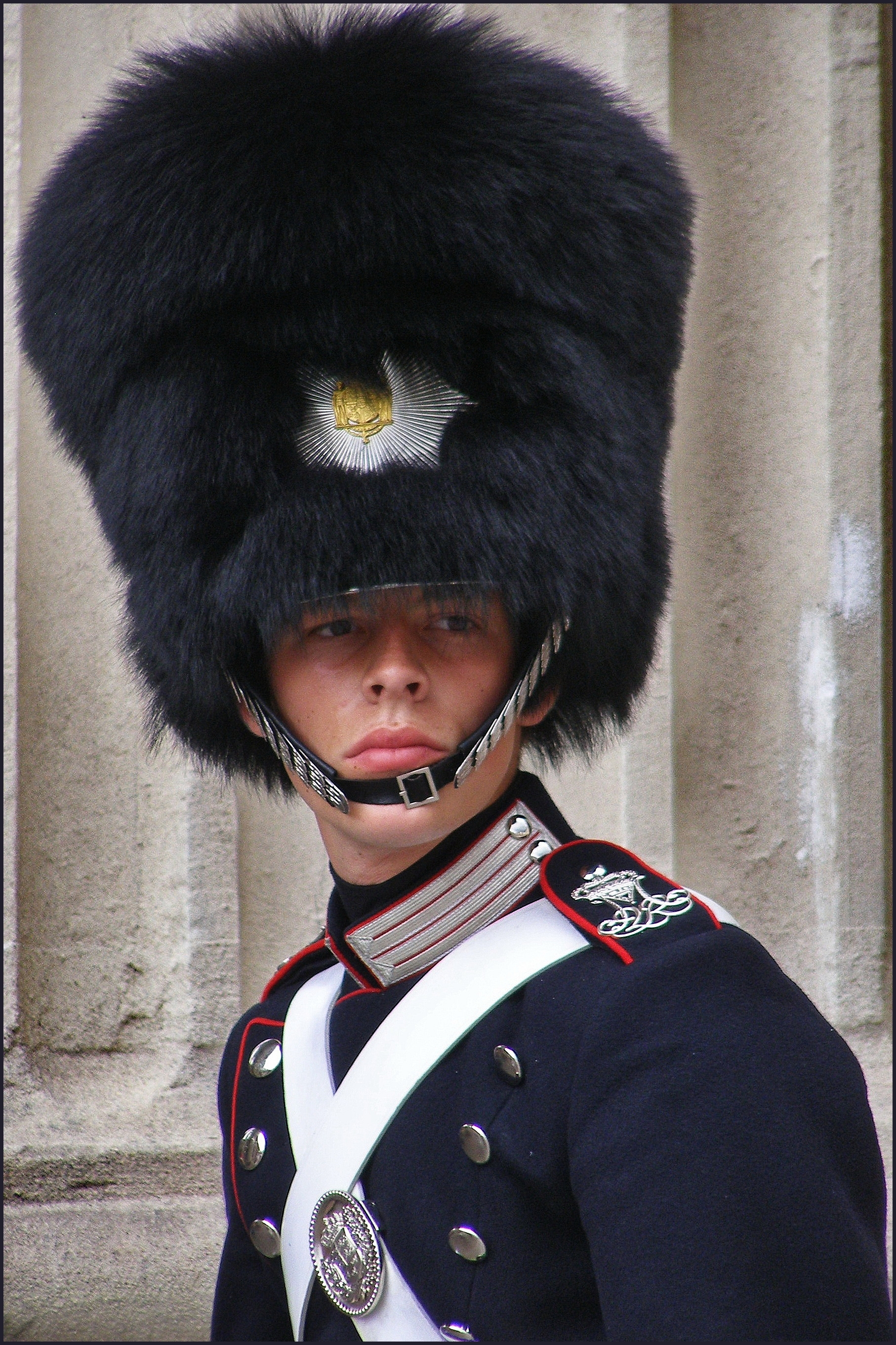
A Danish Royal Life Guardsman with a bearskin

The headgear was first adopted by the Royal Danish Army's Royal Life Guards in 1805. The Royal Life Guards typically wear bearskin caps as a part of their uniform when performing public duties like at Amalienborg. However, on exceptionally warm days, they will be authorised to wear an alternative headgear to mitigate discomfort and prevent overheating.

The bearskin caps used by the Royal Life Guards are manufactured by Rützou saddlery at a workshop based in Taastrup. Rützou purchases its raw materials from a fur company based in Glostrup, which sources its furs from black bears in Canada. After the furs are acquired by Rützou, they are sent abroad to be dyed and tanned before they are returned to Rützou for processing and adaptation. The bearskin cap weighs approximately 2 kilograms (4.4 lb). Its fur is dyed jet black and its fur is at least 8 centimetres (3.1 in) in length.

The Royal Life Guards have approximately 600 to 700 bearskin caps in total. Given the limited number of bearskin caps, each headgear is used by approximately three different individuals each year. The bearskin caps last approximately 25 years with regular servicing and repairs, with the Royal Life Guards only ordering a limited number of new bearskins to replace worn-out caps.

=== Italy ===
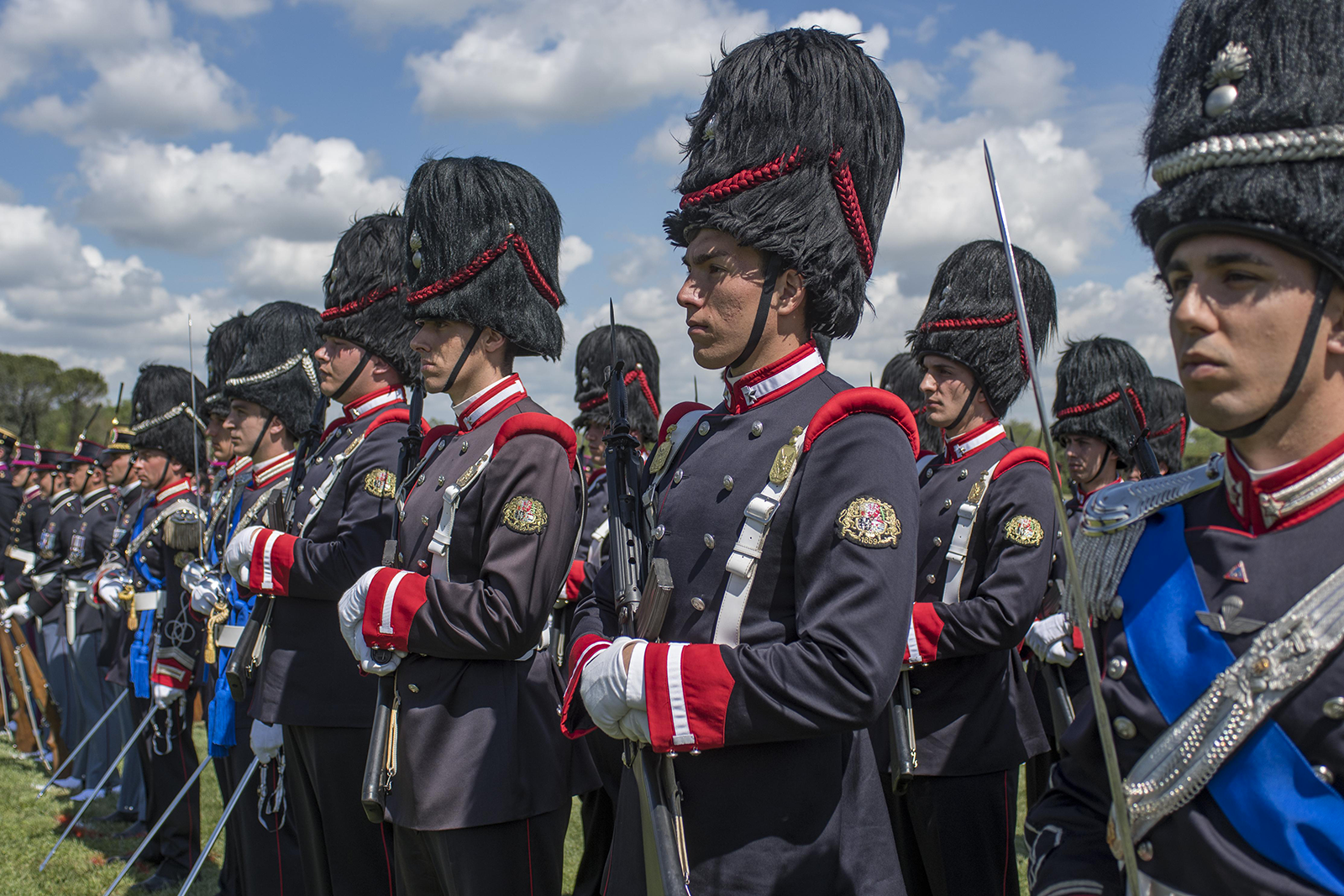
1st Regiment "Granatieri di Sardegna" troops with the bearskin cap introduced in 1834

The 1st Regiment "Granatieri di Sardegna" and 2nd Regiment "Granatieri di Sardegna" of the Italian Army wear bearskin caps as a part of their ceremonial uniform. During the 19th century, the cost and maintenance of the bearskin cap resulted in the headgear's limited use for only specific occasions, until the unit discontinued its use altogether. However, in the 20th century, the units reintroduced the bearskin cap as a part of their ceremonial uniform. The bearskin caps used in the Italian military were once made out of real fur, although they later switched to synthetic materials.

=== Kenya ===
Members of the Kenya Army Band in the Kenya Defence Forces wear bearskin hats made out of synthetic fibres as a part of their full dress uniform.

=== Netherlands ===
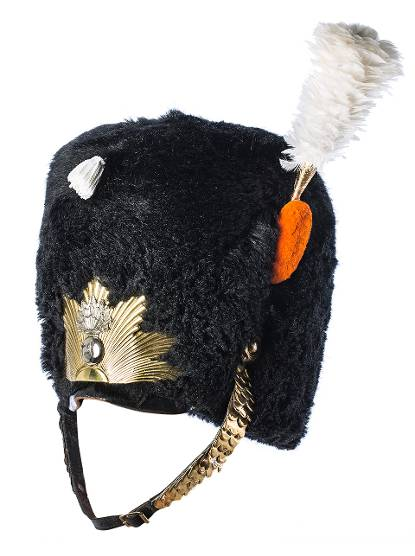
Bearskins used by the Dutch Grenadiers' and Rifles Guard Regiment

The grenadier component of the Grenadiers' and Rifles Guard Regiment wears a bearskin cap as a part of its ceremonial uniform. The unit was formed in 1995 through a merger of the Garderegiment Grenadiers and the Garderegiment Jagers. Although the two units were amalgamated, its jäger component does not wear bearskin caps, and its use is limited to only its grenadier component.

Bearskin caps in the Netherlands Armed Forces originated from mitre caps adorned with a metal front plate badge, used by Protestant grenadier units. Bearskin caps were adopted by the Garderegiment Grenadiers in 1829. However, the unit ceased using the headgear in 1843.

The unit readopted the 1829 bearskin cap design for use as a part of its ceremonial uniform during the inauguration of Juliana of the Netherlands in 1948. However, as opposed to bear fur, the caps were made out of the black-haired Chinese fur goats purchased in the United Kingdom. In 1970, the unit replaced its bearskin caps with ones made out of artificial fur. Use of the ceremonial uniform and the bearskin cap continued by the grenadiers after the unit was amalgamated with the Garderegiment Jagers.

The bearskin cap used by the unit features a copper front plate shaped like a half-sun. A white plume is attached to the left of the bearskin cap, although the cap used by the unit's commander will feature a unique plume to indicate rank. An orange cockade is also placed on the left. The front of the cap also equipped with a black leather visor. Drummers of the unit's military band wear bearskins adorned with a white cotton tassel positioned at the center of the cap's front, while their sousaphonists do not have a white plume on their bearskins.

=== Spain ===
The ceremonial uniforms worn by one company from the 1st King's Immemorial Infantry Regiment includes a bearskin cap.

=== Sri Lanka ===
The military band of the Sri Lanka Artillery wear a black bearskin cap as a part of its ceremonial uniform.

=== Sweden ===
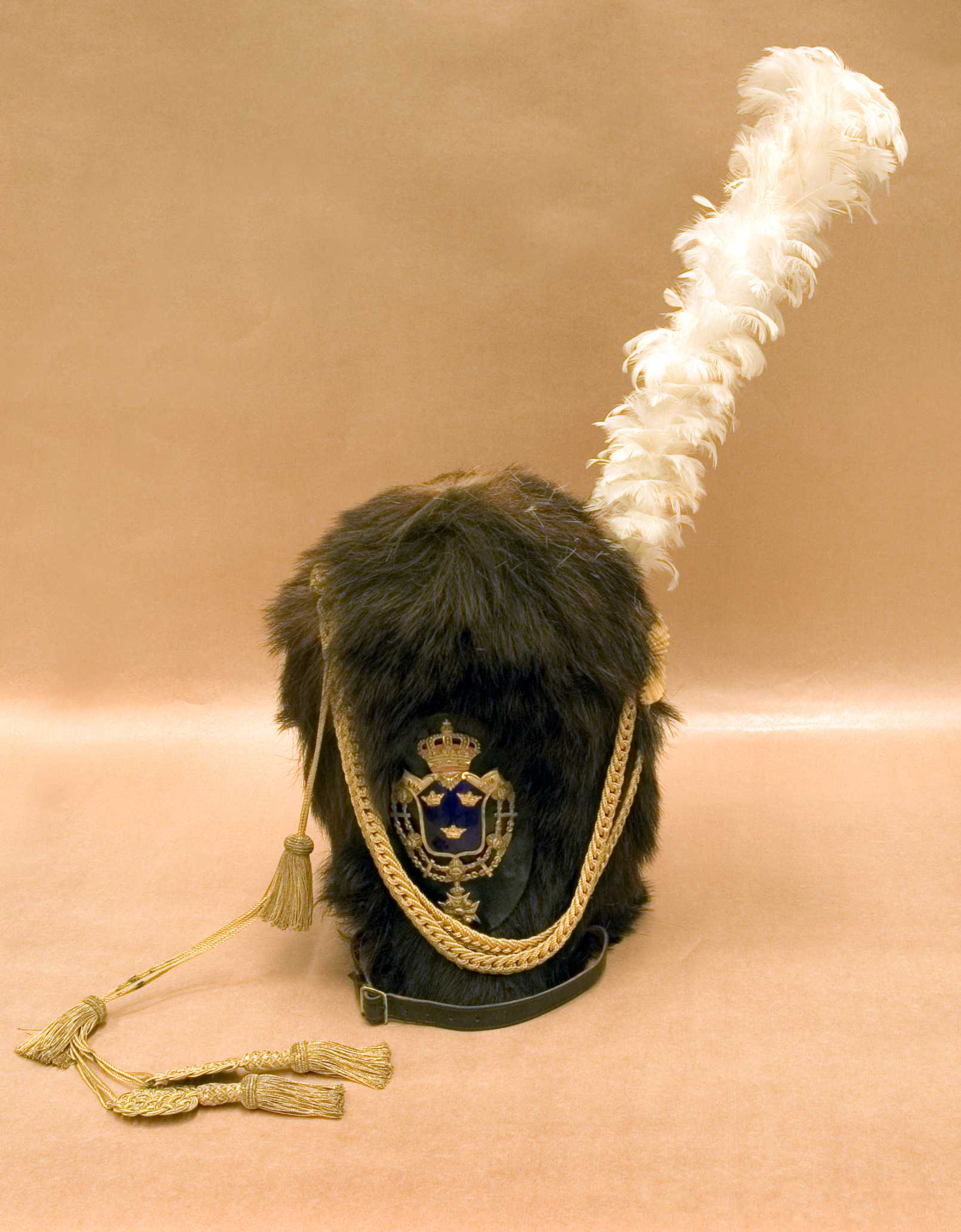
Bearskin model 1823, used by an officer in the Swedish Life Guards.

The parade uniforms used by the grenadier component of the Swedish Army's Life Guards, known as model 1886, includes a bearskin cap.

The bearskin cap, known as model 1823, was once made out of real bearskin, although they have switched to using synthetic materials. The bearskin cap includes a front plate that depicts the coat of arms of Sweden and a white feather plume. Bearskins worn by officers will also include a yellow cockade and gold or silver cord. Bearskins worn by enlisted soldiers will include a red cockade and a white cord. The feathered plume is located on the left side of the headgear, with the cockade threaded into the wooden shaft of the plume. The cord is attached to the bearskin cap by a hook on the right side of the headgear.

=== United Kingdom ===
Use of the bearskin cap was adopted by all Foot Guards, and several other regiments, including the Royal Scots Greys and its successor unit, the Royal Scots Dragoon Guards. Drum majors of fusilier regiments will also generally wear a bearskin or artificial bearskin cap.

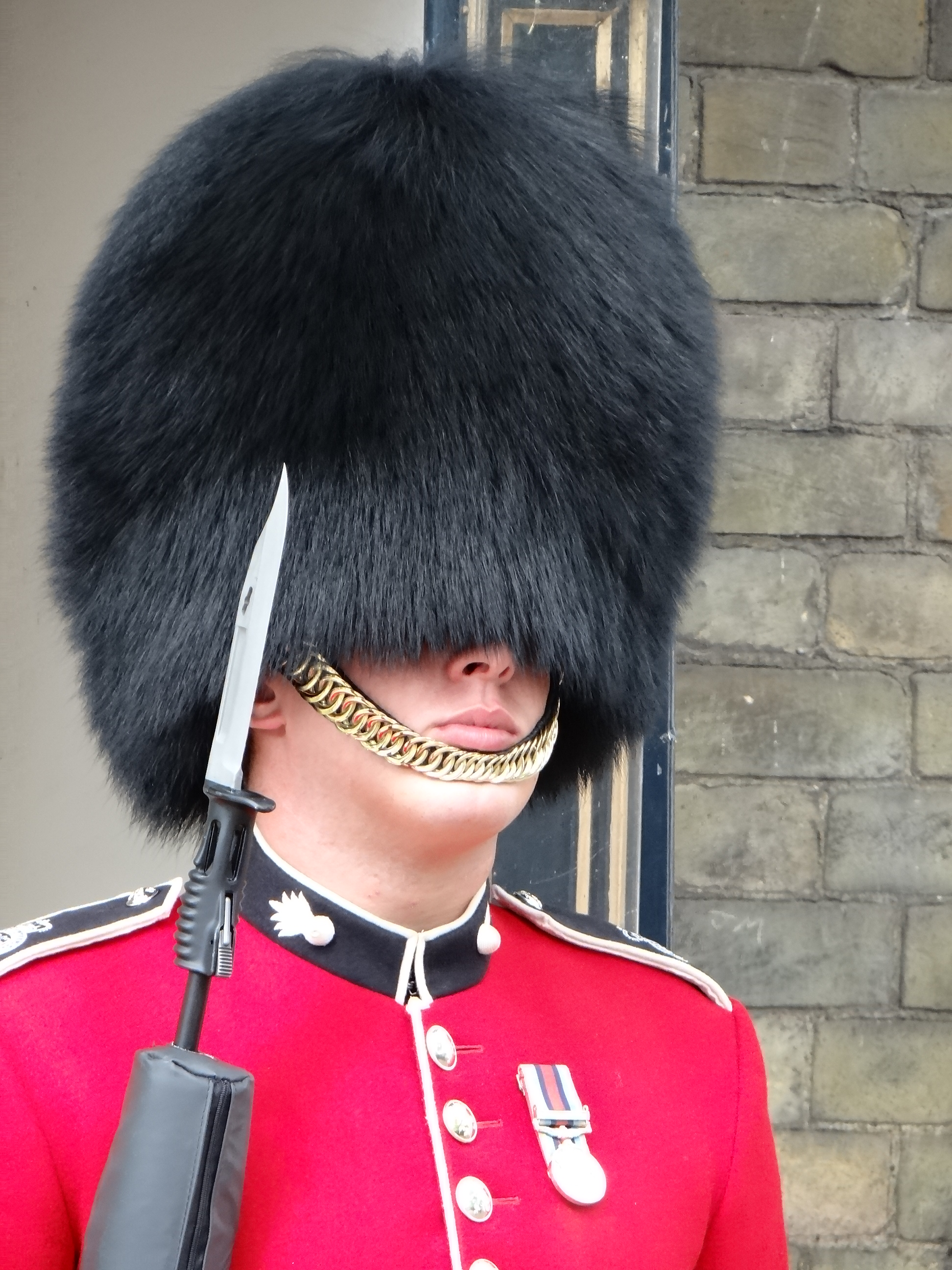
The bearskin caps for British foot guards are coloured black

British bearskin caps were a form of headdress that evolved from mitre caps worn in the 18th century by grenadiers. In 1768, the long cloth caps worn by grenadiers were discontinued, and bearskin caps were introduced. Following the Battle of Waterloo, all members of the newly named Grenadier Guards were permitted to wear the bearskin. This privilege had previously been restricted to the grenadier company of the regiment. In 1831, this distinction was extended to the other two regiments of foot guards (Coldstream and Scots) in existence at that date. Bearskins were subsequently adopted by the Irish Guards and the Welsh Guards when raised in 1900 and 1915 respectively.

The standard bearskin for the British foot guards is 11 inches (280 millimetres) tall at the front, 16 inches (410 millimetres) to the rear, weighs 1.5 pounds (0.68 kilograms), and is made from the fur of the Canadian black bear. An officer's bearskin is made from the fur of the Canadian brown bear, as the female brown bear has thicker, fuller fur; officers' caps are dyed black. An entire skin is used for each headdress. The British Army purchased the caps from a British hatmaker which sources its pelts at an international auction. The hatmakers purchase between 50 and 100 black bear skins each year at a cost of about £650 each.

On 3 August 1888, The New York Times reported that bearskin caps might be phased out because of a shortage of bear skins. The article stated that, at that time, bearskin hats cost £7–5s each, equivalent to £815 in 2025, and noted "it can readily be seen what a price has to be paid for keeping up a custom which is rather old, it is true, but is practically a useless one save for the purpose of military display."

In 2005, the Ministry of Defence began a two-year test of artificial fur for the hats. The army has already replaced beaverskin caps and leopard skins, worn by some of its soldiers, with artificial materials. However, in 2020, the Ministry of Defence stated that it could not find a bearskin cap made out of alternative materials that matches the "natural properties of bear fur", and claimed that artificial fur failed to meet four of its five requirements. The claim has been disputed by the People for the Ethical Treatment of Animals (PETA), who filed for judicial review of the Ministry of Defence's decision in 2022, claiming that the ministry had failed to adhere to its procedures and that artificial fur meets and, in some cases, exceeds its requirements.

Between 2017 and 2022, the Ministry of Defence purchased 498 bearskin caps for use by its units. From 2013 to 2023, the Ministry of Defence spent more than £1 million on bearskins. The cost of bearskins increased from £1,560 each in 2022 to £2,040 in 2023, with the Ministry purchasing 13 bearskins in 2022 and 24 in 2023.

=== United States ===
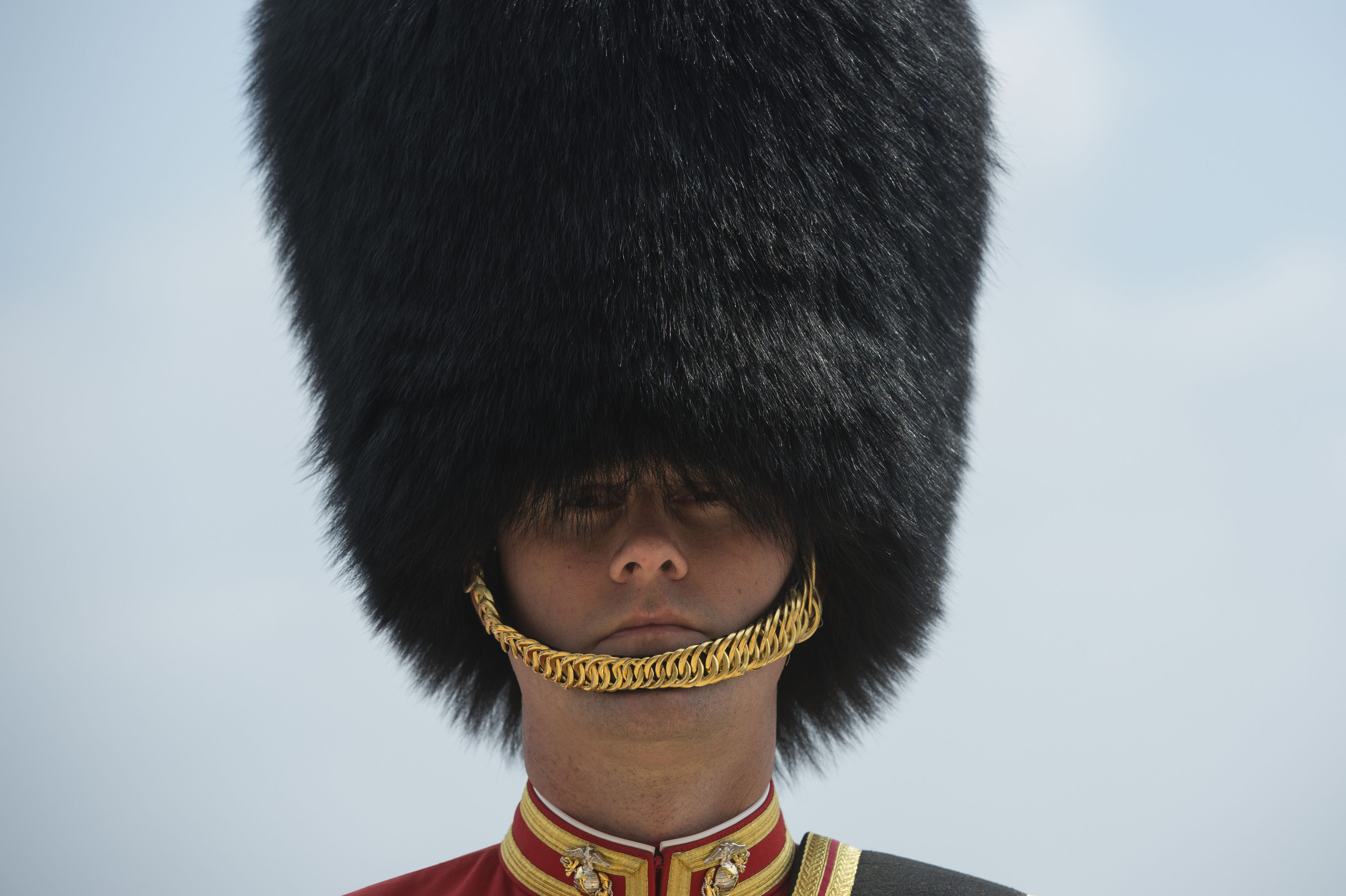
A drum major of the United States Marine Band wearing a bearskin cap. Drum majors in most American military bands wear a bearskin cap.

Drum majors in military bands maintained by the United States Air Force, the United States Army, the United States Coast Guard, the United States Marine Corps, and the United States Navy are authorised to wear bearskins. However, drum majors in the United States Army only wear bearskin caps for a "handful of assignments", while the wearing of bearskins by drum majors in United States Air Force bands is optional.

Drum majors of the United States Marine Corps Band began to wear bearskins in 1859. The bearskins worn by drum majors in the United States Marine Corps Band are made from real black bear fur sourced from Canada, and are styled after the bearskin caps worn by British officers. The bearskins worn by United States Army Band drum majors are also styled after European patterns and were initially made from real bear fur, although the Army later switched to using synthetic materials after it faced objections from environmentalists for using real fur.

The Second Company Governor's Foot Guard of the Connecticut State Guard state defence force wears a bearskin cap as a part of their ceremonial uniform.

=== Uruguay ===
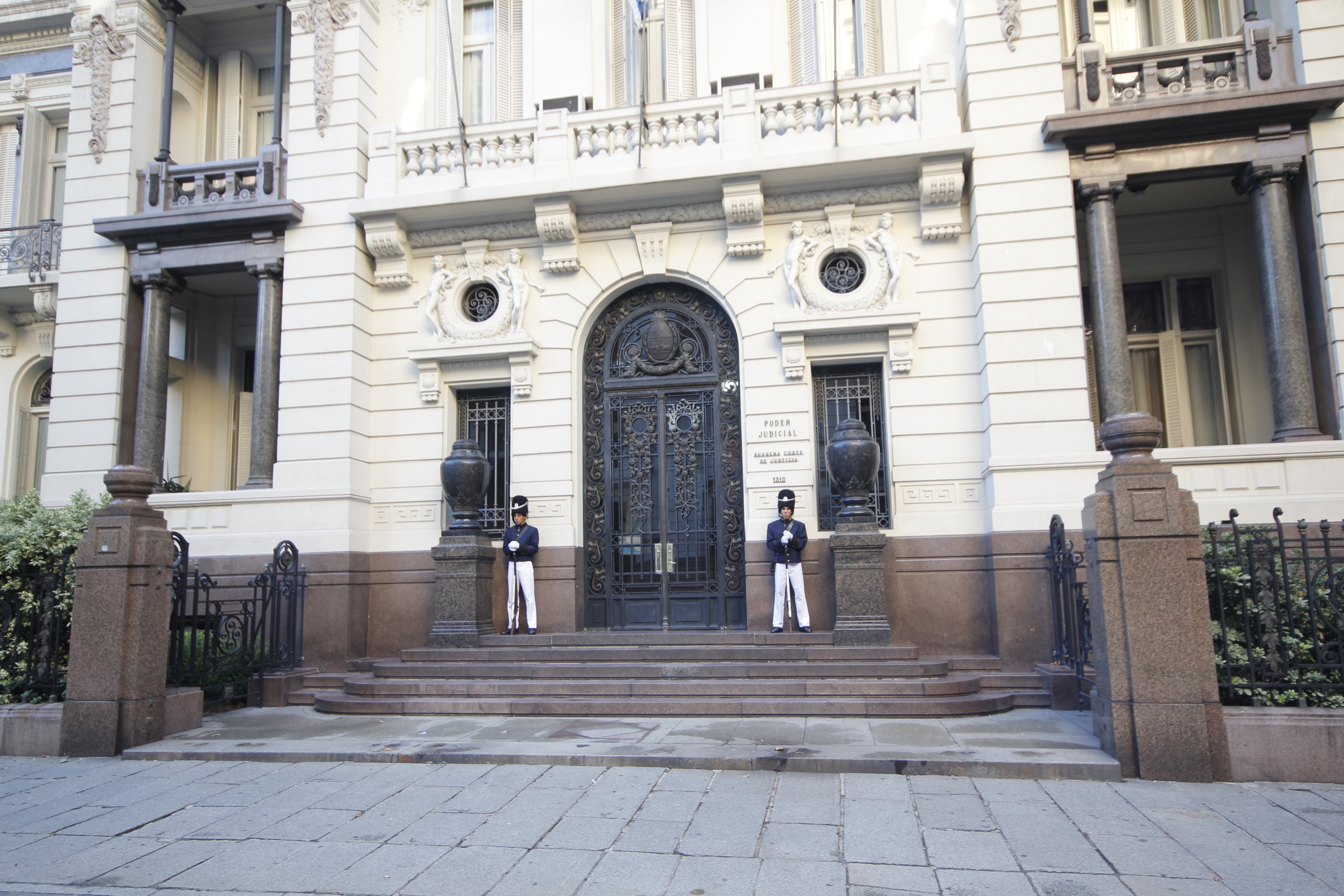
Two guards in a bearskin cap flank the entrance to the Uruguayan Supreme Court.

The Uruguayan Army's "Company of Sappers 1837" uses the bearskin cap as a part of its ceremonial uniform as the protocolar guard of the Judicial Branch of Uruguay. The Company holds a parade when a new supreme court justice is sworn in and two guards permanently flank the entrance to the Uruguayan Supreme Court.

== Opposition to using real bearskin ==
Criticism over the use of the headdress emerged during the late 20th and 21st centuries, ranging from ethics to cost concerns and practicality.

=== Ethics ===
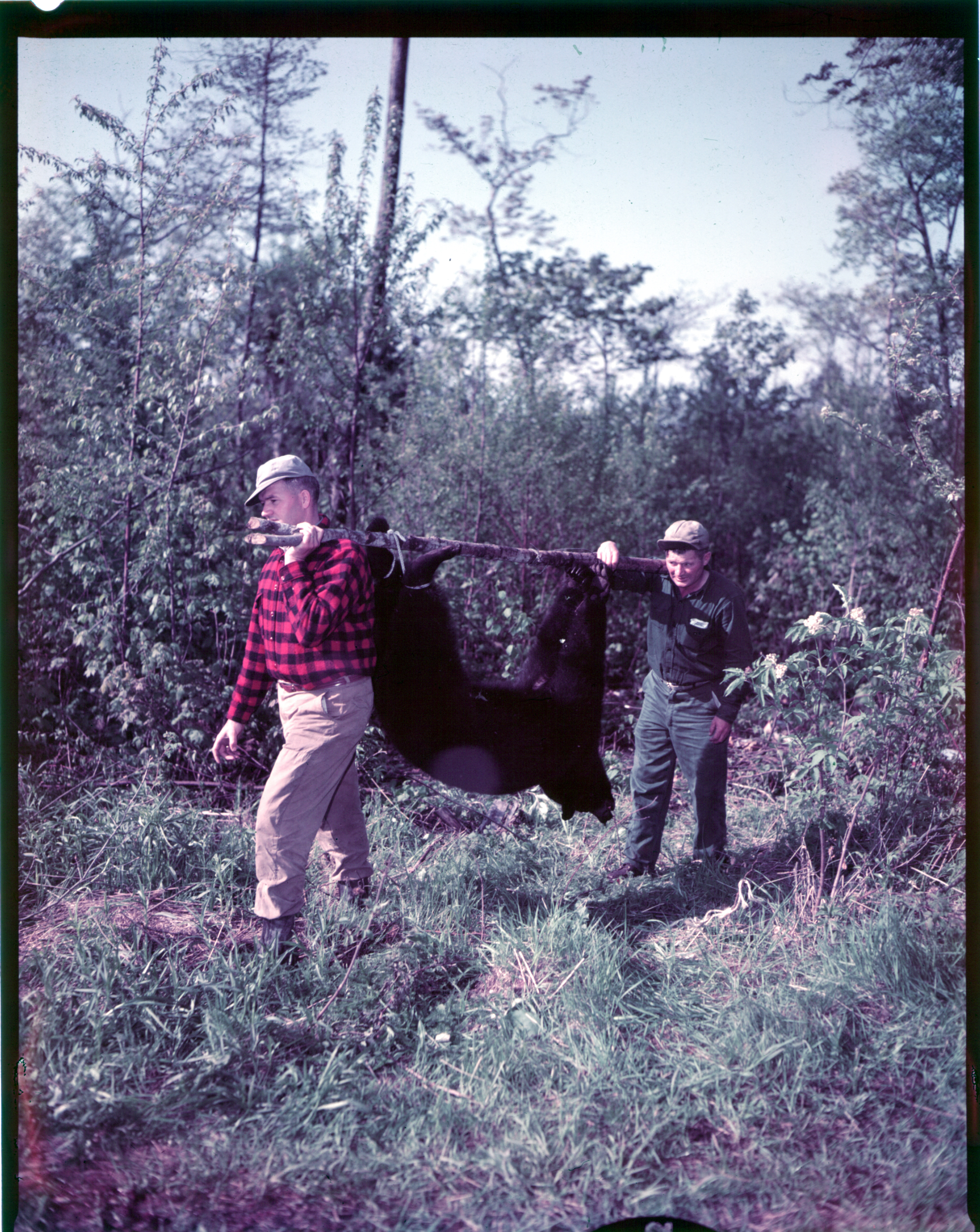
Hunters in Ontario transporting a dead black bear using a carrying pole. Bearskin caps used by several military units are sourced from bears hunted in Canada, a practice opposed by PETA.

Several politicians have voiced their opposition to using the headgear due to its use of real bear furs. In 1997, British Minister for Defence Procurement Lord Gilbert said that he wanted to see bearskins phased out as soon as possible due to ethical concerns. Similar sentiments were made in March 2005 by British Labour MP Chris Mullin, who called for an immediate ban on bearskins, stating that they "have no military significance and involve unnecessary cruelty." In 2023, the European Commission's representative to Denmark launched a social media campaign advocating for the replacement of the bearskin caps used by the Danish Royal Life Guards with an artificial alternative, given the bear's protected status within the European Union.

Animal rights group PETA has publicly voiced its opposition to the use of real bearskin since 2002 and has held demonstrations against its use in the United Kingdom, including one at St Peter's Hill, near St Paul's Cathedral, in 2006. In February 2011, Joss Stone appeared in a PETA advert targeting the British Ministry of Defence, showing the 23-year-old soul singer holding a teddy bear that covered her naked body and featured the slogan "Bear Hugs, Not Bear Caps".

In January 2024, PETA launched a campaign against the use of real bearskin by the British and Canadian militaries and called on both the British and the Canadian defence ministries to retire the headgear in favour of humane headgear sold by luxury faux furrier ECOPEL. PETA claimed that the raw materials used to make the headgear were sourced from hunting bears with bait in Canada. However, the British Ministry of Defence asserted that the furs came from "legal and licensed" hunts within a "regulated Canadian market". The manufacturer of bearskin caps for the Danish Royal Life Guards, which also source their furs from Canada, argued that bear culling was necessary for population control and was conducted under the supervision of biologists with approval from the World Wildlife Fund.

=== Practicality ===
In 2023, a commentator for The New York Times questioned the use of the headdress after three members of the British Bands of the Household Division fainted during a rehearsal while in full dress uniform wearing woollen uniform and a bearskin, remarking how it was "soldiering on in our old, wrong clothes" in the light of climate change.

== Similar headgear ==
=== Other furred caps ===
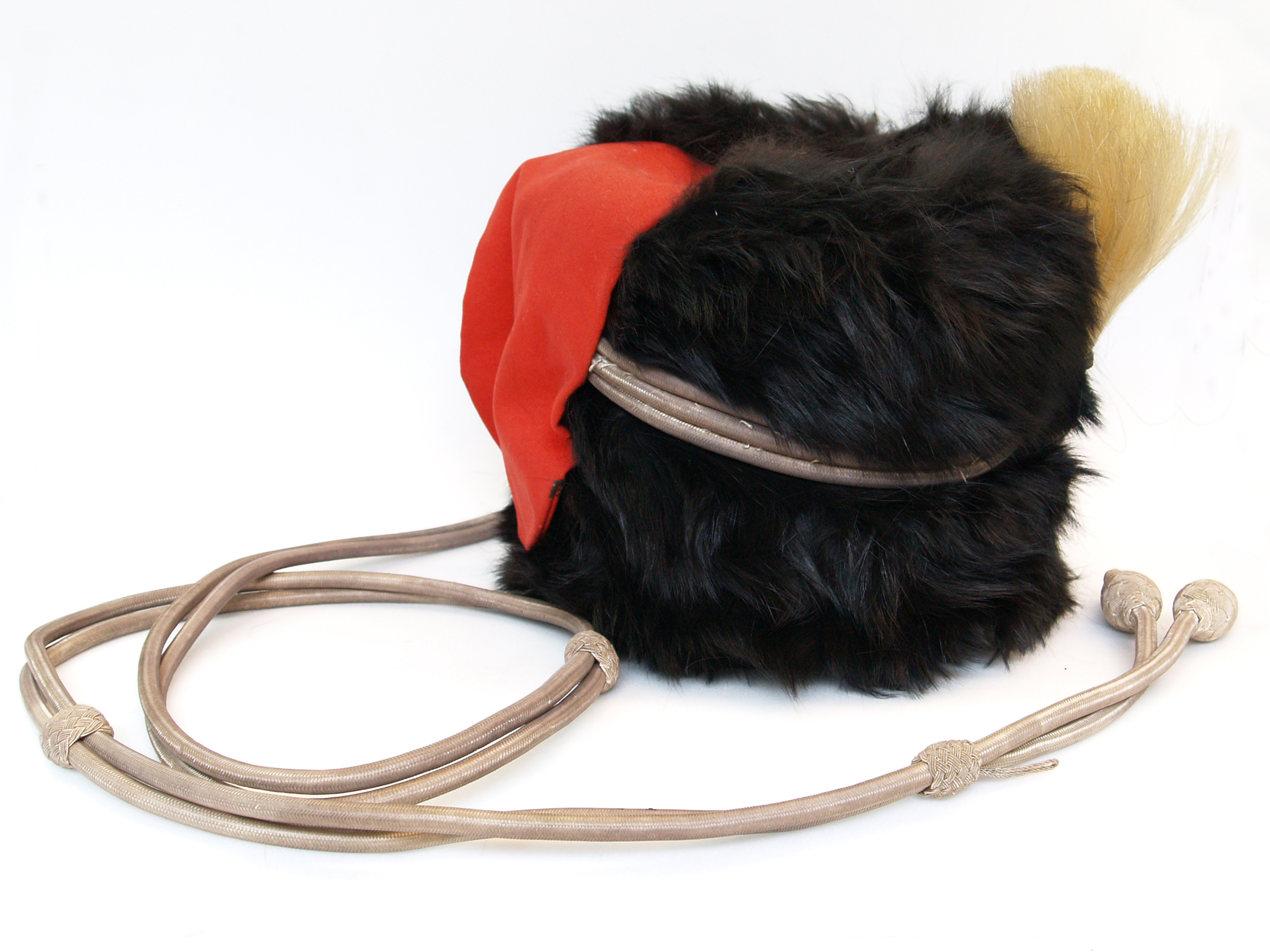
A busby worn by a British artillery unit from the 19th century. The headgear is an example of a furred cap similar in appearance to the bearskin.

A busby is a furred cap that was historically worn by hussars, and remains in use as a part of the ceremonial uniforms for British and Canadian hussar units. In addition to hussars, the busby also forms a part of the ceremonial uniforms for British and Canadian artillery units and select rifle regiments. Other units that wear the busby as a part of their uniforms include the British Royal Corps of Signals and Royal Engineers, the Dutch Royal Marechaussee, and the First Company Governor's Foot Guard of the Connecticut State Militia.

A sealskin cap is another furred cap similar to the bearskin cap, that is worn by the British Army's Royal Regiment of Fusiliers.

=== Heavily plumed pith helmet ===
Several units in the King's Guard of the Royal Thai Armed Forces wear pith helmets with heavy plumes that broadly resemble a bearskin cap as a part of their ceremonial full dress uniform. The colours of the plumes vary depending on the units of the wearers.

The majority of the units authorised to wear the bearskin cap are from the Royal Thai Army and Royal Thai Air Force, although two Royal Thai Marine Corps battalions are also entitled to wear the headdress. In addition, the Royal Security Command's two guards regiments wear pith helmets with black plumes as their full dress headdress.

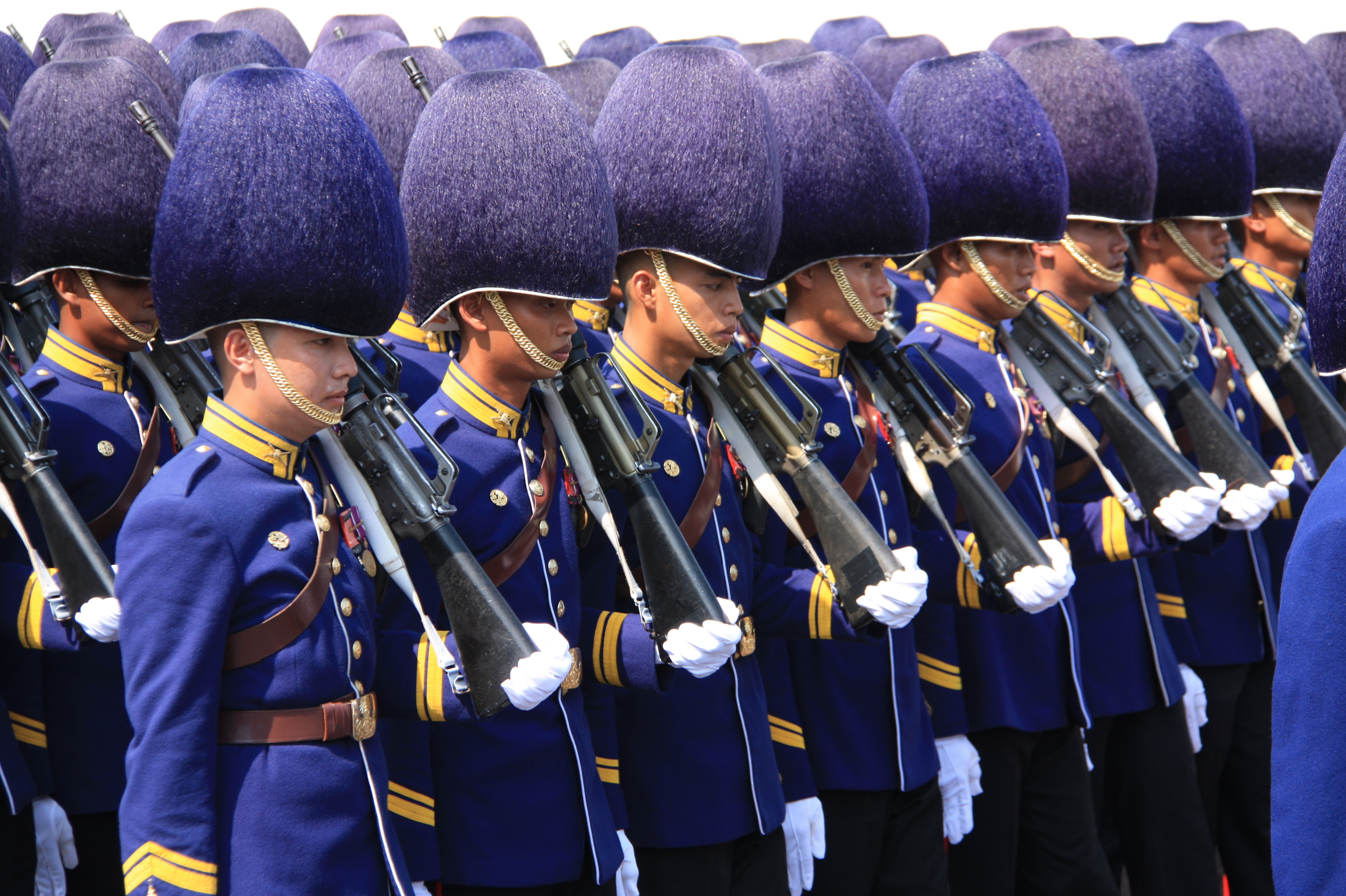
Several units in the Thai King's Guard use a pith helmet with a heavy plume, resembling a bearskin cap.

== See also ==
- List of hat styles
- List of fur headgear
- Feather bonnet
- Shaguma
