= Madaraka Day =

Self-Governance day in Kenya (Partial Independence)

- Observed by: Kenya
- Significance: Celebrates Kenya attaining internal self rule
- Celebrations: Festivals
- Date: 1 June
- Next time: 1 June 2027
- Frequency: annual
- Related to: Independence of Kenya

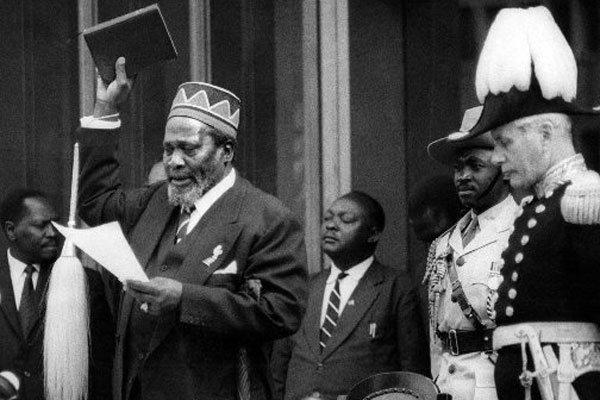

Madaraka Day ("Internal self rule" or Self-Governance Day) is a national holiday that is celebrated every 1 June in every year in the Republic of Kenya. It commemorates the day in 1963 that Kenya attained internal self rule after being a British colony since 1920. Kenya only attained partial independence on this day in 1963 and did not become a fully established republic until about a year and a half later, on 12 December 1964. In recognition of that, Kenya also celebrates Jamhuri Day (Republic Day) on 12 December every year.

Madaraka is a Swahili word for "self authority", "the assignment of authority".

== Rotational hosting ==
On 18 December 2015 after the fourth biannual National and County Government Summit, President Uhuru Kenyatta announced that two of the national holidays of Madaraka day, Mashujaa and Mashujaa Day would be hosted in a different county each year breaking the tradition of hosting them in the Capital, Nairobi. These changes were implemented to increase national unity and cohesion.

== Events ==
The 63rd Madaraka Day celebrations (2026) were held at the newly constructed Wajir Stadium in Wajir, Wajir County. During the event, President Ruto announced plans to rename the stadium after Ahmed Mohamed Khalif, the first Cabinet minister from Wajir. Ahmed was appointed by President Mwai Kibaki as the Minister for Labour in 2003, less than a month before he died in a plane crash accident.

== See also ==
- Public holidays in Kenya
