= Maroon Commandos =

Kenyan military band

Maroon Commandos is a musical group from Kenya. It is a military band belonging to 7 Kenya Rifles (Kenya Army Infantry) of the Kenya Army. They are based at the Langata Barracks in Langata, Nairobi. The group performs benga, rumba and other styles of music. They perform both original and cover versions. The band plays often at state functions.

The group was formed in 1970 by bandleader Habel Kifoto and some other member. The next year they signed with Polydor Kenya and released the hit "Emily". In 1972 the band had a traffic accident, which left some of their members dead. After the accident the band was dormant for five years before releasing their album Riziki Haivutwi after 1977. They also released the song "Charonyi ni Wasi", whose lyrics were written in the Taita language. "Charonyi Ni Wasi" became Maroon Commandos' first major hit.

The band had a 10-year recording break which ended with the release of Shika Kamba album in 2007, released by the Sound Africa label.

The band has had several line-up changes since its formation. Former bandleader Habel Kifoto retired from the military and was from 2009 to 2011 the chairman of Music Copyright Society of Kenya (MCSK). Kifoto died on 31 July 2011 in Nairobi as he collapsed due to a suspected heart failure. One of its former core members, David Kibe Left the band after he rose in the military ranks and had no more time for the band. Another former member was Laban Ochuka, who also played for another army band, the Ulinzi Orchestra. Ochuka died in May 2006.

ranks.

== Discography ==
Their albums until 1991 were released by Polydor Kenya and the latest albums by Sound Africa.

- Riziki Haivutwi (1977 or later)
- Dawa Nimuone Hani (1983)
- Pesa Maradhi Ya Moyo (with Daudi Kabaka) (1986)
- Hasira ni Hasara (1986)
- Bila Jasho "Mwakaribishwa na Maroon" (1989)
- Bonya Kuché (1990)
- Shikamoo (1991)
- Shika Kamba (2007)
- Kenya Unite
- Habel Kifoto & Maroon Commandoes – Greatest Hits
