= Jamhuri Day =

National holiday in Kenya

Republic Day
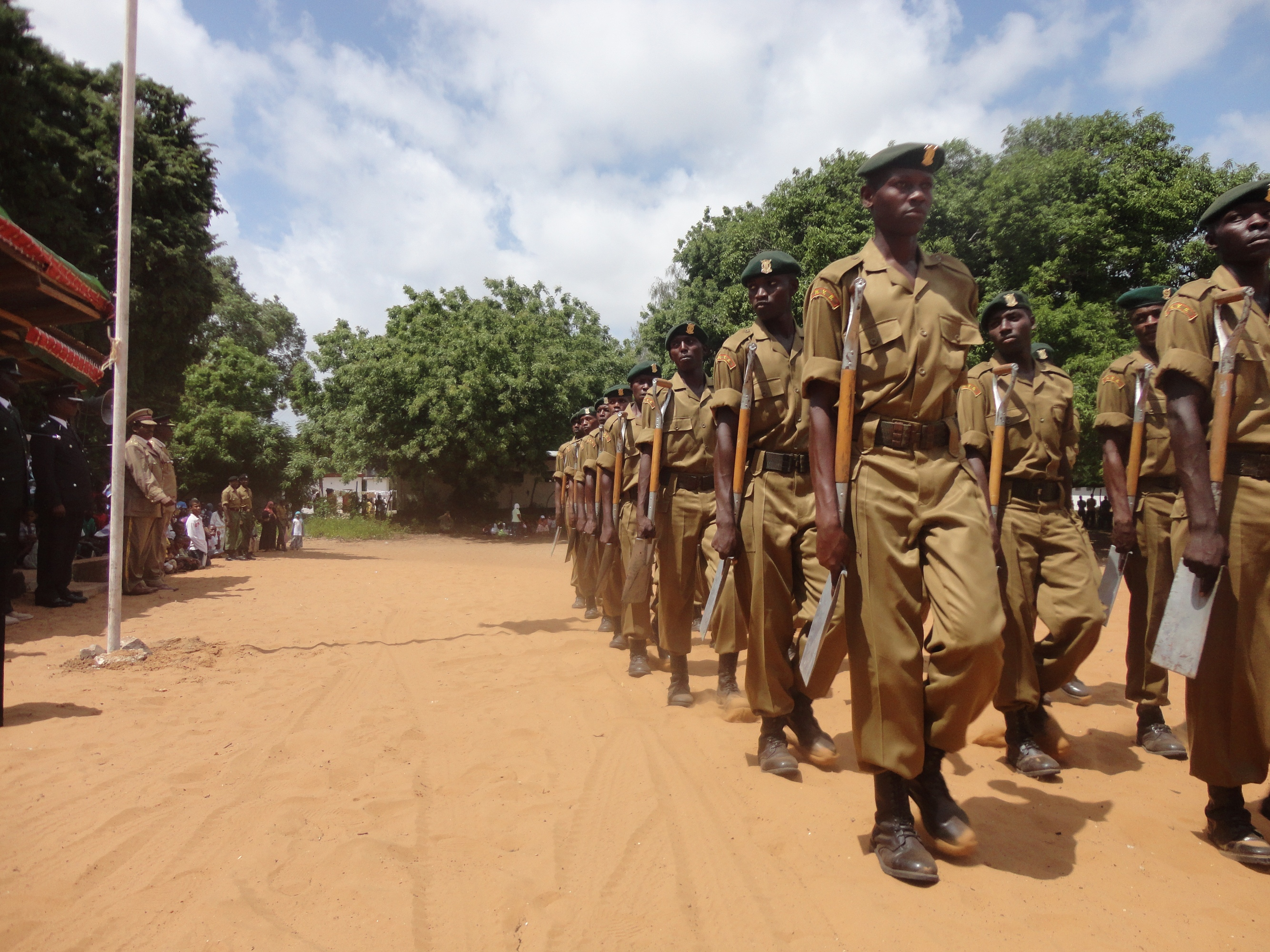
- Official name: Jamhuri Day
- Observed by: Kenya
- Significance: Celebrates the founding of the Republic of Kenya
- Celebrations: Trooping of the Colour, Festivals
- Date: 12 December
- Frequency: Annual
- Related to: Independence of Kenya

Jamhuri Day (Independence Day) is a national holiday in Kenya, celebrated on 12 December each year. Jamhuri is the Swahili word for "republic" and the holiday officially marks the date when Kenya became an independent country on 12 December 1963, six months and eleven days after gaining internal self-rule on 1 June 1963 (Madaraka Day) from the British Empire.

Kenya later became a republic, with the inauguration of Jomo Kenyatta as president taking place on 12 December 1964, exactly one year after Kenya attained independence in 1963. Kenyatta, having previously been sworn in as prime minister, continued as prime minister of newly independent Kenya, before assuming the position of president one year after Independence Day.

== Trooping of the Colour ==
The Trooping of the Colour of the Kenya Defence Forces takes place every Jamhuri Day. The ceremony begins at 11:30 after the President of Kenya, takes the national salute, and inspects the parade. The band plays a slow march followed with a quick march the lone drummer then breaks away to take his position beside number one guard to play the drummers call, signaling the officers of No.1 Guard to take positions to receive the colour. The escort for the colour then marches off to collect the colour as the massed KDF band plays the chosen Kenyan tune. After the hand over and as the Escort presents arms the first verse of the Kenya national anthem is played, then the escort to the colour marches off in a slow march to the tune of the British grenadier guards. The first tune normally played during the march is always 'By land and sea'. The parade concludes by marching to the tune of 'Kenya Daima' as the tri-service parade exits.

Jamhuri Day is occasionally also used by the military to grant infantry battalions their formal Presidential and Regimental Colours. The honoured unit upon being conferred the colours proceeds with the Trooping of the Colour. In such a ceremony the President as Commander-in-Chief is formally dressed in ceremonial Kenya Army red tunic dress and once the flags are consecrated by an Anglican Bishop, Catholic Bishop and Muslim Kadhi the President formally hands the colours to two flagbearers who receive them when down on one knee.

=== List of units Trooping the Colour ===
Year	Colour	Salute taken by	Remarks
2000	Kenya Navy	President Daniel arap Moi	
2009	Kenya Navy	President Mwai Kibaki	
2013		President Uhuru Kenyatta	Celebrated the golden jubilee of the Republic of Kenya. It was attended by dignitaries such as Paul Kagame, John Mahama and Yoweri Museveni.
2014	9th Kenya Rifles Battalion	President Uhuru Kenyatta	
2015	15th Kenya Rifles Battalion	President Uhuru Kenyatta	
2016	Kenya Navy	President Uhuru Kenyatta	The guest of honor was Mia Amor Mottley, Prime Minister of Barbados.
2017	Moi Air Base, Kenya Air Force	President Uhuru Kenyatta	
2018	17th Kenya Rifles Battalion	President Uhuru Kenyatta	Celebrated the 55th anniversary of the Republic of Kenya. The 17th Kenya Rifles received its colors on the same day and were re-located to their new base in Modika, Garissa County.
2019	Laikipia Air Base, Kenya Air Force	President Uhuru Kenyatta	Second time since the base's establishment in 1974.
2020	5th Kenya Rifles Battalion	President Uhuru Kenyatta	
2021	19th Kenya Rifles Battalion	President Uhuru Kenyatta	The 19th Kenya Rifles received its Presidential and Regimental Colours at Uhuru Gardens
2022	23rd Mechanised Infantry Battalion	President William Ruto	The 23rd Mechanised Infantry Battalion received its Regimental and Presidential flags at Nyayo Stadium.

== National Awards ==
During Jamhuri day various Orders, decorations, and medals of Kenya are awarded by the President to Kenyans in recognition of their distinguished service to the country. A National Honours and Awards Committee advises the President as to the eligible recipients who are derived from a list of nominees. Individuals are nominated to the Committee by government ministries, district committees, the Kenya Defence Forces, national police service, religious organisations, non-governmental organisations, individuals and others. Some of the recipients largely members of the military, uniformed services who have exhibited exceptional heroism and athletes who have distinguished themselves are publicly awarded their orders, decorations and medals before the country during national celebrations, whereas the rest are awarded during the State Luncheon or have their names published in the Kenya Gazette.

== Rotational hosting ==
On 18 December 2015 after the fourth biannual National and County Government Summit, President Uhuru Kenyatta announced that two of the national holidays of Madaraka Day, Jamhuri Day and Mashujaa Day would be hosted in a different county each year breaking the tradition of hosting them in the Capital, Nairobi. These changes were implemented to increase national unity and cohesion.

== See also ==
- Mazingira Day – Kenyan environmental holiday
- Republic Day in other countries
- Public holidays in Kenya
