= Mashujaa Day =

Kenyan heroes' national holiday

Mashujaa Day or Heroes' Day, is a national public holiday observed on 20 October to collectively honour all those who contributed towards the struggle for Kenya's independence or positively contributed in the post independence Kenya.

== Entomology ==
Mashujaa is Swahili for "heroes".

== History ==
It was previously known as Kenyatta Day, which was celebrated to commemorate the detention in Kapenguria of freedom fighters Achieng' Oneko, Bildad Kaggia, Fred Kubai, Jomo Kenyatta, Kung'u Karumba and Paul Ngei, often referred to as the Kapenguria Six. However, following the promulgation of the Constitution of Kenya in August 2010, Kenyatta Day was renamed.

== Rotational hosting ==
On 18 December 2015 after the fourth biannual National and County Government Summit, President Uhuru Kenyatta announced that two of the national holidays of Madaraka Day, Jamhuri Day and Mashujaa Day would be hosted in a different county each year breaking the tradition of hosting them in the Capital, Nairobi. These changes were implemented to increase national unity and cohesion.

The 2026 celebrations were co-hosted by Uasin Gishu County, Elgeyo Marakwet County, and Nandi County. The theme was "Security, Sports and the Finance Sector (The Economy)". They brought an influx of tourists and business to Eldoret.

== See also ==
- Jamhuri Day – Kenyan republic day
- Madaraka Day – Self-Governance day in Kenya (Partial Independence)
- Mazingira Day – Kenyan environmental holiday
