= Bands of the South African National Defence Force =

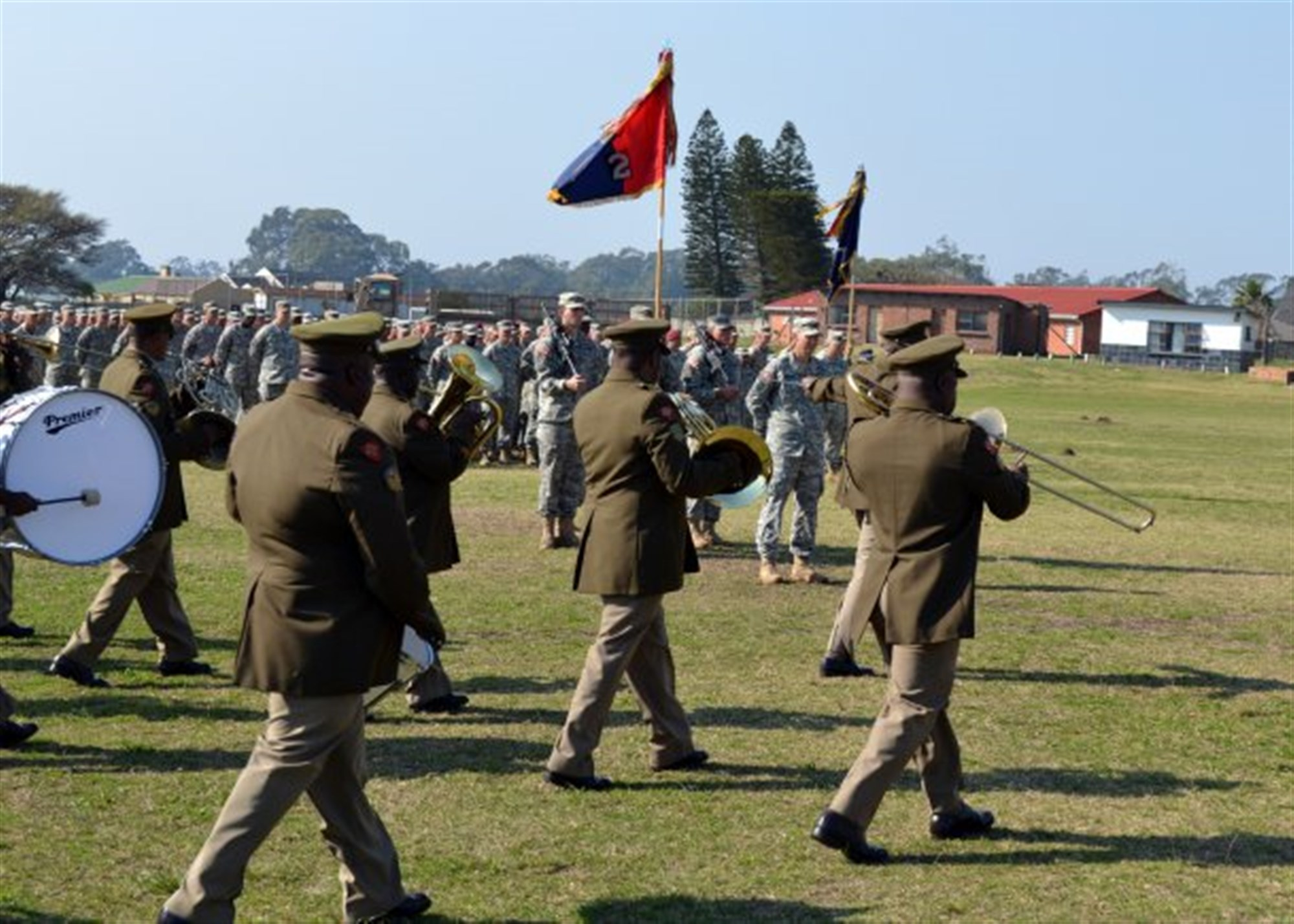
South African military band in 2013

There are currently 9 main military bands currently belonging to the South African National Defence Force (SANDF), which represent the different branches of the SANDF (South African Army, South African Navy, South African Air Force, South African Military Health Service) and providing music on ceremonial occasions. Since military bands were introduced in the country, they have played a prominent role in public and military life. Pipe bands also play an important role in South African military music, with notable pipe bands coming from the Cape Town Highlanders, Transvaal Scottish Regiment, Cape Field Artillery Regiment and the South African Military Health Service. Military bands of the SANDF are also affiliated with the police bands of the South African Police Service. In addition to military music, military bands in the SANDF perform different genres, including classical, jazz, pop and light music.

== Main functions ==
External videos
- SANDF Marching Bands

The main responsibility for military bands in the SANDF is to provide musical support to the South African Army, as well as indirectly foster high morale and pride. The bands of the SANDF provide musical accompaniment for official ceremonies such as the Armed Forces Day parade and the swearing-in of the President of South Africa. Bands also perform for heads of State and government, most notably the Elizabeth II, President Bill Clinton, Colonel Muammar Gaddafi and Prime Minister Tony Blair and President Vladimir Putin. Educational requirements include musical knowledge, as well as basic infantry training. The members of these band regularly make visits to foreign countries as well as host other bands and musical groups in South Africa.

== Corps of Bandsmen ==
Founded in 1969, the South African Army Corps of Bandsmen (SACB) is the main military band service of the South African Army. It presides over the 5 military bands of the army as well as the NCG Band. Army Bandsman are required to wear the No 1 Dress Uniform, which is also worn by the National Ceremonial Guard (NCG).

=== Army Band Cape Town ===
The South African Army Band Cape Town is based in Cape Town and is the oldest regular force band in the country. It originated in 1915 as the regimental band of the 1st Battalion, The Cape Corps, a famous fighting unit of World War I. When the Cape Corps was disestablished in 1919, the band continued on a part-time basis. When the Cape Corps was re-activated at the start of the Second World War, the band returned to full-time service in the regiment. Although Cape Corps was disbanded for the last time in 1992, the 42-member band was retained as one of the five regional Army bands and was renamed to SA Army Band Cape Town under the directorship of Major Chris Nicholls.

In 2006, Lieutenant Martin Chandler, the youngest qualified director in the Corps of Bandsmen, succeeded Nicholls as Director of Music. The band has won the best many marching band awards and is widely regarded as one of the foremost military bands in Africa. In 2000 the SANDF initiated a music-training program at the band's headquarters in Cape Town, to assist young recruits of the Military Skills Development System and various African countries such as Namibia, Rwanda, Zimbabwe, Congo and Botswana in training military musicians. The band has performed extensively at various events, including the Grahamstown National Arts Festival and the Klein Karoo National Arts Festival amongst others. The band has also received much praise for their involvement in the first Opening of Parliament and the inauguration of President Nelson Mandela in 1994.

=== Army Band Limpopo ===
The South African Army Band Limpopo, based in Polokwane, traces its roots back to the first South African Permanent Force Band, which was formed in the 1930s. The band Limpopo came into being when the former Venda Defence Force Band and the Far Northern Transvaal Command Staff Band were combined. The current Director of Music, Captain Benedict Sibande, is one of only a few South African bandsmen to study at the Royal Military School of Music in the United Kingdom.

=== Army Band Kroonstad ===
The South African Army Band Kroonstad based in Kroonstad, is the regional military band serving the Free State province. It was founded in 1977, when the excellent Correctional Services Band was dissolved as a result of re-organization in that department. Many bandsmen from that band were transferred to the South African Army and became founder members of the new Kroonstad Band. The band was re-formed on 1 April 1997. In 2008, it became the first South African band to visit the United States when it participated in the Virginia International Tattoo. The Director of Music of the band is Major Dawie Fourie, one of the Correctional Services founder members. The Kroonstad Band is generally regarded as one of the best military bands in South Africa.

== Regalia ==
=== Insignia ===
Good Conduct Stripes
Garment with Pocket: Centred on the right pocket
Garment without Pocket: 10 millimetres (0.39 in) below the name badge
Insignia
SA Army Band Uniform - National Flag Red with Gold Stripes
Level 1	Level II	Level III
SANDF - Embossed Good Conduct Badge - SA Army - SA Army Band Uniform - National Flag Red with Gold Stripes - Level I	SANDF - Embossed Good Conduct Badge - SA Army - SA Army Band Uniform - National Flag Red with Gold Stripes - Level II	SANDF - Embossed Good Conduct Badge - SA Army - SA Army Band Uniform - National Flag Red with Gold Stripes - Level III

=== SACB Insignia ===
Corps of Bandsmen Insignia
Description	Service Dress	Embossed
Musician	SANDF - BADGE - Qualification - Mess Dress - SACB - Musician	Musician (Qualification/Post) Musician (SACB). Black on Thatch beige, Embossed. Round badge. Lyre with a wreath
Senior Musician	SANDF - BADGE - Qualification - Mess Dress - SACB - Senior Musician	Senior Musician (Qualification/Post) Senior Musician (SACB). Black on Thatch beige, Embossed. Round badge. Lyre with a wreath enclosed in a black circle
Principle Musician	SANDF - BADGE - Qualification - Mess Dress - SACB - Principle Musician	Principal Musician (Qualification/Post) Principal Musician (SACB). Black on Thatch beige, Embossed. Square badge. Lyre with a wreath
Chief Musician	SANDF - BADGE - Qualification - Mess Dress - SACB - Chief Musician	Chief Musician (Qualification/Post) Chief Musician (SACB). Black on Thatch beige, Embossed. Square Badge. Lyre with a wreath enclosed in a black square.
Group Leader	SANDF - BADGE - Qualification - Mess Dress - SACB - Group Leader	Group Leader (Qualification/Post) Group Leader (SACB). Black on Thatch beige, Embossed. Lyre with a wreath, surrounded by a Laurel Wreath.
Band Master		Band Master (Qualification/Post) Band Master (SACB). Black on Thatch beige, Embossed. Lyre with a wreath, surrounded by a Laurel Wreath enclosed within a black circle.
Music Director	SANDF - BADGE - Qualification - Mess Dress - SACB - Director of Music	Director of Music (Qualification/Post) SACB. Black on Thatch beige, Embossed. Square Badge. Lyre with a wreath, surrounded by a Laurel Wreath
Senior Director		Senior Director of Music (Qualification/Post) SACB. Black on Thatch beige, Embossed. Square Badge. Lyre with a wreath, surrounded by a Laurel Wreath, enclosed in a black square.

=== Head Dress ===
Head Dress
Cap Badge	Beret	Service Dress Cap
SANDF - INSIGNIA - Badge - Cap - SA Army Band (SACB)	No Image	No Image

=== Uniforms ===
Uniforms
Jacket	Trousers
SANDF - JACKET - Men - SA Army - SA Army Band (SACB) - Red	SANDF - TROUSERS - Men - SA Army - SA Army Band (SACB) - Red

=== NCO Rank ===
NCO Service Dress Rank
Staff Sergeant	Sergeant	Corporal	Lance Corporal
SANDF - INSIGNIA - Rank - NCO - SA Army - Embossed - Gold On Black - Crest In Silver - Pin On - Staff Sergeant - NCG and MD Left	SANDF - INSIGNIA - Rank - NCO - SA Army - Embossed - Gold On Black - Pin On - Sergeant - NCG and MD	SANDF - INSIGNIA - Rank - NCO - SA Army - Embossed - Gold On Black - Pin On - Corporal - NCG and MD	SANDF - INSIGNIA - Rank - NCO - SA Army - Embossed - Gold On Black - Pin On - Lance Corporal - NCG and MD

== NCG Band ==
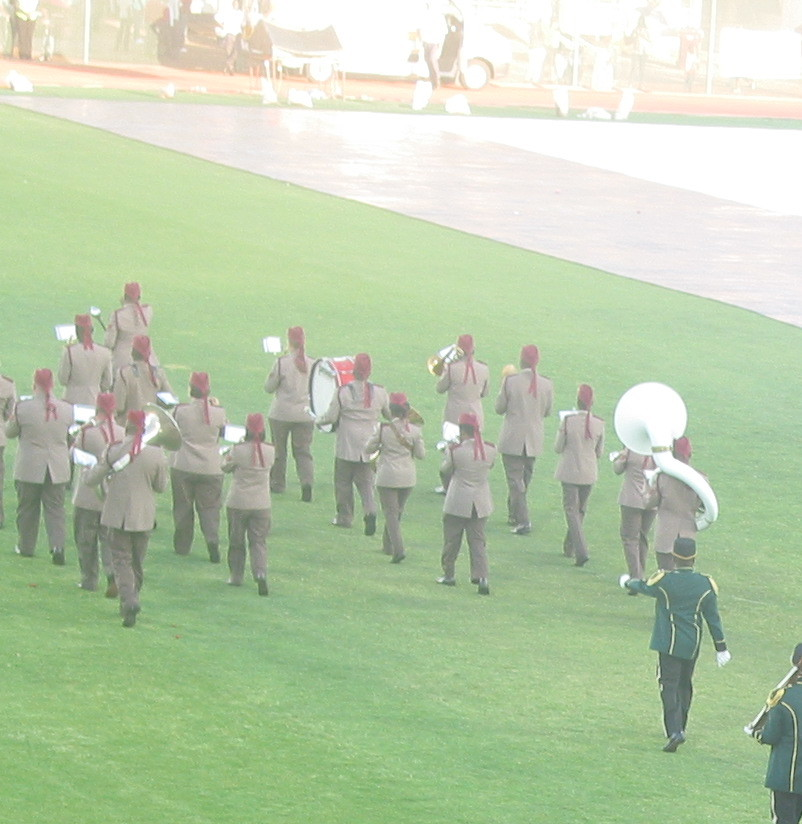
The NCG Band on parade

External videos
- MILITARY BAND IN JOHANNESBURG (SOUTH AFRICA 1965)

The National Ceremonial Guard Band (NCG Band) is the military band unit attached to the NCG. It is led by Music Director Lt. Col. Andrew Strugnell. The NCG Band serves as the seniormost band of the entire SANDF. Since 2001, the band has undertaken the role training of military bandsmen from Namibia and Botswana.

== Regimental Bands ==
=== Cape Field Artillery ===
The Cape Field Artillery Band was formed in 2005 because of a relationship between the Platinum Brass Band the regiment. Originally, the Platinum Brass Band was a marching band. During the course of the 2010 FIFA World Cup in South Africa, Pipe-Major (S/Sgt)Andrew Imrie of the Cape Field Artillery Pipes and Drums played Nightfall in Camp from the Leerdam Bastion. The band is based at the Castle of Good Hope and is now under the leadership of Pipe-Major Grant Scheffel and Warrant Officer Class 2 Andrew Imrie who is the Bandmaster.

=== Cape Town Highlanders ===
The Drums and Pipes participated in a special parade centenary for the Queen Mother in Edinburgh. The Drums and Pipes have since the death of the Queen Mother in 2002, the band performed regularly at the Royal Edinburgh Military Tattoo (2002, 2004, 2006, 2009 and 2012). In 2006, they were invited, together with the Queensland Police Pipe Band and 4 bands from the newly formed Royal Regiment of Scotland to perform at Balmoral Castle for the Royal Family. The Band has also participated in the Basel Tattoo, The Berlin Military Tattoo, Jinhae (South Korea) and at the Cape Town Tattoo, held in the Castle of Good Hope.

=== Transvaal Scottish Regiment ===
The Transvaal Scottish Regiment Pipes and Drums is the SANDF's premier Pipe Band. Formed in 1902 and nicknamed the "Jocks", the band is one of South Africa’s most recognised military pipe bands. They have won the premier division of the South African championships on numerous previous occasions and in 2019, were considered the best pipe band in South Africa. It consists of students and professionals, usually White South Africans with a Scottish background. The drummers of the band wear the Murray of Atholl tartan, the regimental tartan, whilst the pipers wear Murray of Tullibardine tartan. The Regimental March, Atholl Highlanders, is a key part of the band's repertoire. The Pipes and Drums are led by Pipe Major Craig Whitley and Drum Major and Leading Drummer Anthony Evans.

=== Durban Regiment ===
Since its inception, the Durban Regiment has operated a military band that functioned to support the unit at military functions and parades. In 1976 the Montclair Pipe band (a civilian band) became affiliated to the military band and over a very short time the pipe contingent absorbed the bugles and trumpets of the military band. The Durban Regiment Pipe Band now forms the musical component at the unit and effectively supports the unit at military functions and parades.

=== The Duke's Band ===
The Duke's Band is a brass and reed band maintained by the Cape Town Rifles. It was formed a few months after the Regiment itself was established and its first performance was in 1856, during which the Governor of the Cape Colony, Sir George Grey, inspected them. It is the only military band in the Commonwealth of Nations to have ever had a Victoria Cross recipient for a bandmaster (Bandmaster Tommy Rendle). The Duke's Band is the oldest surviving military band in South Africa and in the whole of Africa.

=== Kimberly Regiment ===
As per regimental traditions, the Kimberley Regiment Pipe Band adheres to its distinctly Scottish traditions, which is evident in the uniforms and regimental culture. Its history began in 1927 with the arrival of brothers Angus and Hamish Scott came to Kimberley in 1926 to work for what is now known as Tech Cominco. The following year, the brothers, along with a small group of pipers and drummers, established the Kimberley Pipe Band. Since 1977, the military tattoos have been held to commemorate the anniversaries of the Pipe Band.

=== Historical regimental bands ===
- Transvaalse Staatsartillerie Band
- D'Urban Cavalry Band
- South African Irish Regiment Pipes and Drums

== Other military bands ==
=== South African Navy Band ===
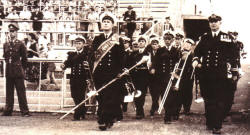
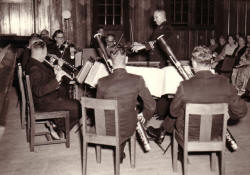
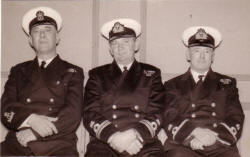
Members of the South African Navy Band in the 1950s
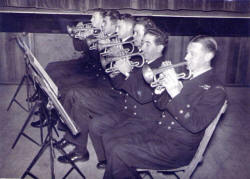
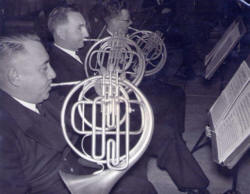
Members of the South African Navy Band in the 1960s

The South African Navy Band (SAN Band) supports the ceremonial activities of the South African Navy. The band was originated as the First Permanent Force Band of the Union Defence Force in 1934. Over the years it has changed its name several times before keeping its current name in December 1954. In May 1955 the band transferred to Simon’s Town from Pretoria. After South Africa left the Commonwealth in 1961, the South African marines were disbanded and the band was transferred to Youngsfield under the command of the Coast Guard. In 1957 the band then moved to the Recreational Hall in East Dockyard, Simon’s Town, before they moved to Cable Hill, where they are currently stationed.

The first Officer in Charge of the band was R.S. "Steel" Downey, who is considered by many band members as the “Father of the South African Navy Band”. He served as remained involved with the band until his retirement in 1958. He still continued to work with the band until his death in September 1976. The first Director of Music appointed was Lt(SP) John Imrie who was previously Assistant Director of Music of the SA Air Force Band. The band is made up of 47 members who have a history of taking part in international military music festivals since 2002. This band performs anywhere between 150 and 200 musical engagements during a calendar year with its Marching Band, Concert Band, Dance Band, Marimba Group and Chamber Group.

Past Directors of Music

Commander John Imrie, Commander Ron Marlow, Commander Mike Oldham, Commander Kenny Leibbrandt, Commander Lindela Madikizela (Current)

.

=== South African Air Force Band ===
"Die Stem van Suid-Afrika" performed by the SAAF Band.

The South African Air Force Band (SAAF Band), formerly known as the Union Defence Force Band, is the official military band of the South African Air Force, based at Valhalla in Centurion. The band was established after World War II in 1946 by Captain Harry Philips, who was a member of the Union Defence Force Band. Since the band's inception, it has performed at major national events, most notably the unveiling of the new coat of arms of South Africa by Thabo Mbeki in Bloemfontein. The SAAF Band has many different small groups within the band which performs at various official functions. These groups include: Classical music pianists, light music pianists, piano ensemble, trumpet ensemble, saxophone quartet, Brass Quintet, woodwind quintet, jazz trio, clarinet soloist, dance band, and a big band. The band's motto is Semper in Concentu (Always in Harmony).

=== South African Military Health Services Band ===
The South African Military Health Services Band (SAMHS Band) supports the ceremonial activities of the South African Military Health Service. It was formed in the late 1960s as the National Service Band under the leadership of WO1 ‘Stoney’ Steenkamp. Since the early 1980s, the band has offered full-time jobs in the band. The band also maintains a pipes and drums unit, which is commonly known as the SAMHS Pipes and Drums.

== See also ==
- South African Army corps and branches
- List of badges of the South African Army
- Military band
- Corps of drums
- List of marching bands
