= List of hospitals in Kenya =

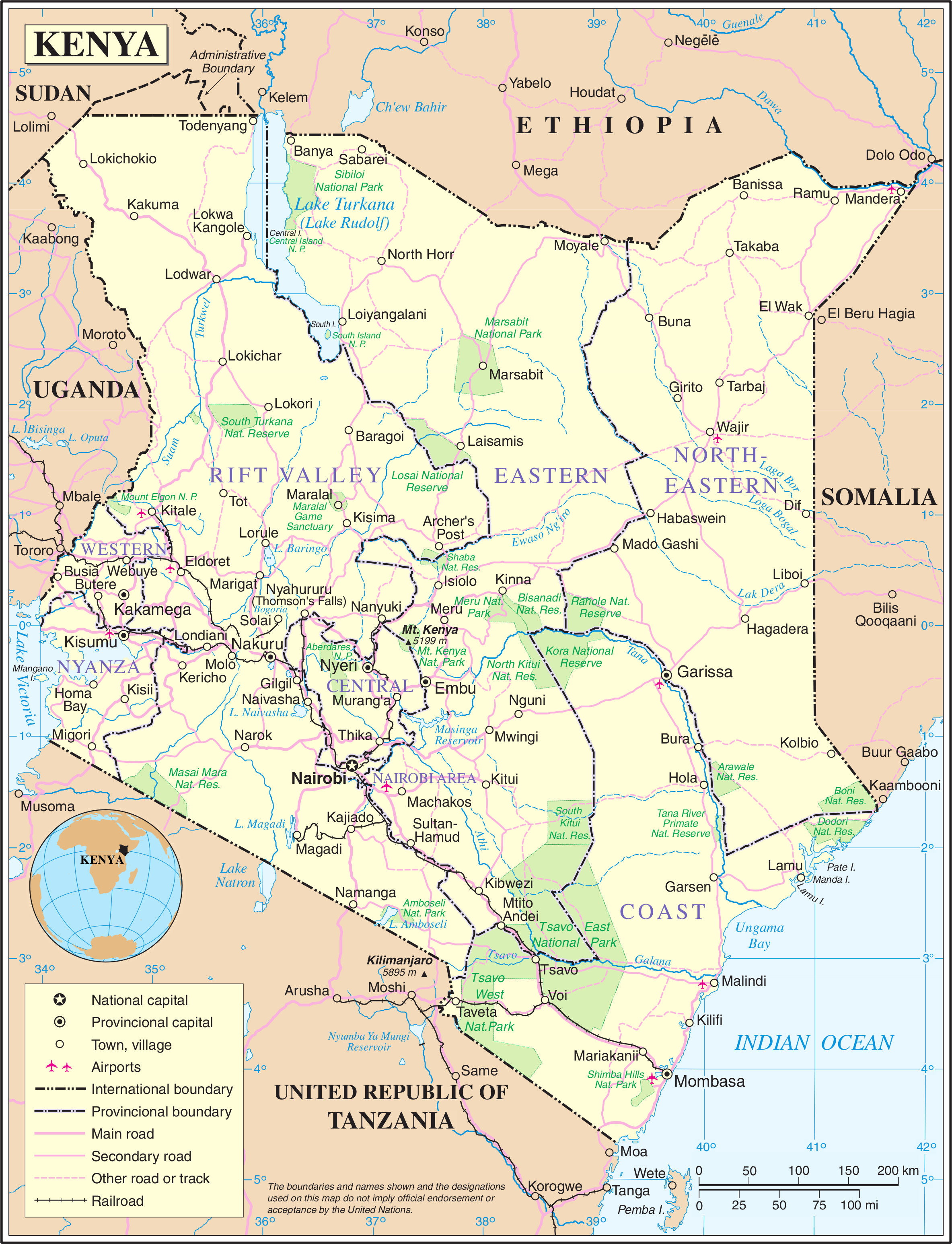
Map of Kenya showing former Provinces before 2013

This is a list of hospitals in Kenya by former provinces and county.

== History of the oldest hospitals ==
The oldest hospital in Kenya is the Mombasa Hospital, which was opened for Europeans in 1891. In 1898, the British opened the Native Civil Hospital in Makadara for non-European Patients. In 1944, the government decided to dedicate the Mombasa hospital to the African community and let European and Asian patients go elsewhere.

== Classifications ==
By 2021, there were 57 public hospitals, including seven national referral hospitals, 47 county referral hospitals, and two sub-county hospitals. There are 103 private hospitals, 58 mission hospitals, and 12 NGO hospitals in Kenya.

Hospitals are classified into three levels: Level 6 hospitals are national referral hospitals and large private teaching/mission (faith-based) hospitals; Level 5 hospitals are county referral hospitals and large private/mission (faith-based) hospitals; and Level 4 hospitals are sub-county hospitals and medium-sized private/mission (faith-based) hospitals

By 2 October 2026, there were a combined total of 6,427 public Level 2 to Level 4 hospitals and health facilities, 27 public Level 5 hospitals, and 518 contracted faith-based facilities.

== Medical service levels ==
The levels of medical services in Kenya are assessed by the Ministry of Medical Services and the Ministry of Public Health and Sanitation. The same evaluation system is used for all public, private, mission, and NGO type health facilities.

Level	Type	Location	Examples	Total in 2021
6	Tertiary referral hospital, national hospitals	Capital City, County	Kenyatta National Hospital	8
5	Secondary referral hospital, teaching and referral hospitals, County Referral Hospitals	County	Embu Teaching and Referral Hospital	82
4	Primary facilities, sub county hospitals and equivalent	Sub-County Hospitals	Mombasa Hospital	133
3	Health Centre, Maternity Centre	City, town, ward	Jacaranda Maternity Clinic	6
2	Dispensaries and clinics	Village Level	Isana Dispensary	
1	Community Health Units	Community	Kosirai community unit	

== Nairobi County ==
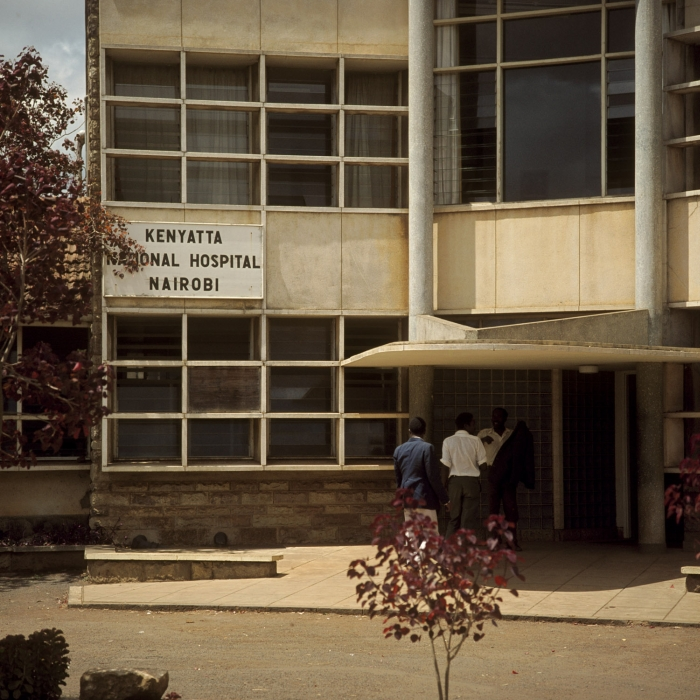
Kenyatta National Hospital

The largest number of hospitals are in Nairobi County with 62 hospitals. Notable hospitals are listed below.

Hospitals in Nairobi County
Name	Nairobi locale Coordinate	Opened	Level	Beds
AAR Hospital	Nairobi; 1°14′16″S 36°50′40″E	2021	5	140
Aga Khan University Hospital, Nairobi	Parklands; 1°15′39″S 36°49′26″E	1958	5	254
Avenue Hospital	Parklands; 1°15′52″S 36°49′05″E	1976	4	140
Bristol Park Hospital Tasia Embakasi	Embakasi; 1°18′31″S 36°53′40″E		4	70
Brother André Medical Center in Dandora	Dandora; 1°14′37″S 36°54′26″E	2017		
Coptic Hospital Nursing Hospital	Nairobi (Note: The main hospital is located along Ngong Road opposite China Centre and currently has two branches in Industrial Area and another in Maseno, Vihiga.); 1°17′51″S 36°47′51″E		5	240
Gertrude's Children's Hospital	Muthaiga; 1°16′06″S 36°50′24″E	1947	5	100
Guru Nanak Ramgarhia Sikh Hospital	Parklands; 1°16′10″S 36°49′57″E	1985	4	52
The Karen Hospital	Karen; 1°17′10″S 36°49′12″E	2006	6	102
Kenyatta National Hospital (Note: These hospitals are National Hospitals.)	Nairobi; 1°17′18″S 36°48′23″E	1901	6	1800
Kenyatta University Teaching, Referral, and Research Hospital	Kahawa West; 1°10′49″S 36°55′38″E	2019	6	650
Mama Lucy Kibaki Hospital	Eastlands area 1°16′26″S 36°53′56″E	2013	4	112
Mariakani Cottage Hospital	South B 1°18′37″S 36°49′51″E	1984	4	45
Mater Misericordiae Hospital, The	Nairobi Industrial Area; 1°18′25″S 36°50′05″E	1962	5	176
Mathari National Teaching and Referral Hospital	Mathare (bordering); 1°15′38″S 36°50′48″E	1910 (Note: The Mathari National Teaching and Referral Hospital was established in 1904 as a Smallpox isolation Centre and later became a lunatic Asylum. In 1924, it became Mathari Mental Hospital. In 1964, it became Mathari Hospital. It is the only public psychiatric hospital.)	6	700
Mbagathi County Referral Hospital (Note: The Mbagathi County Referral Hospital was formerly known as the Infectious Disease Hospital and then in 1995 the Mbagathi District Hospital)	Golf Course; 1°18′31″S 36°48′12″E	1950s	5	220
Mediheal Hospital Eastleigh (Note: The Mediheal Hospital also has branches in Parklands, Upperhill, Edloret, Nakuru and Rwanda.)	Eastleigh; 1°17′11″S 36°51′07″E		5	70
Metropolitan Hospital	Eastlands area 1°17′15″S 36°52′31″E	1994	4	150
Meridian Equator Hospital	Nairobi; 1°18′27″S 36°49′28″E		4	54
MP Shah Hospital	Parklands; 1°15′48″S 36°48′43″E	1930s (early)	5	210
Nairobi East Hospital	Eastleigh; 1°16′47″S 36°50′52″E		5	80
Nairobi Hospital	Upper Hill; 1°17′46″S 36°48′16″E	1954	5	750
Nairobi South Hospital, The	South C 1°18′49″S 36°49′42″E		2	73
The Nairobi West Hospital	Nairobi West; 1°18′23″S 36°49′33″E	1980s	6B	400
Nairobi Women's Hospital	Hurlingham; 1°17′37″S 36°47′46″E	2001	5	654
National Spinal Injury Referral Hospital	Kilimani; 1°17′17″S 36°47′38″E	1944	6	30
Pumwani Maternity Hospital	Pumwani; 1°16′49″S 36°50′47″E	1926	1	354
South B Hospital	South B 1°18′43″S 36°50′16″E	1993	4	35
St. Mary's Mission Hospital, Nairobi	Lang'ata; 1°19′20″S 36°46′28″E	1999	4	299
World Trade Centre Hospital	Ngong Road; 1°18′25″S 36°44′25″E	2027 Expected	4	150

== Central Province ==
Since 2013, the former Central Province consists of the following counties: Nyandarua County, Nyeri County, Kirinyaga County, Murang'a County, and Kiambu County.

Hospitals in the former Central Province
Name	Locale Coordinates	County	Opened	Level	Beds
AIC Cure International Hospital (Note: AIC stands for Africa Inland Church or Africa Inland Mission.)	Kijabe; 0°56′49″S 36°35′40″E	Kiambu County		5	32
AIC Kijabe Hospital	Kijabe; 0°56′49″S 36°35′40″E	Kiambu County	1915	5	363
Consolata Hospital Mathari	Nyeri; 0°24′47″S 36°55′11″E	Nyeri County	1938	4	230
Gatundu Level 5 Hospital (Note: Gatundu Level 5 Hospital was formerly known as the Gatundu District hospital)	Gatundu; 1°00′54″S 36°54′22″E	Kiambu County	1966	5	300
Kerugoya County Referral Hospital	Kerugoya; 0°30′16″S 37°16′53″E	Kirinyaga County		5	276
Kiambu County Referral Hospital	1°10′30″S 36°49′50″E	Kiambu County		5	417
Murang'a County Referral Hospital	Muranga; 0°43′04″S 37°09′40″E	Murang'a County		5	317
Nazareth Hospital	Limuru; 1°07′48″S 36°43′36″E	Kiambu County	1964	5	220
North Kinangop Catholic Hospital	0°33′17″S 36°33′15″E	Nyandarua County		5	309
Nyeri County Referral Hospital (Note: The Nyeri County Referral Hospital was previously known as the Nyeri Provincial General Hospital)	Nyeri; 0°25′32″S 36°57′49″E	Nyeri County	2005	5	407
Othaya Provincial General Hospital; Mwai Kibaki Teaching and Referral Hospital	Othaya; 0°31′37″S 36°56′15″E	Nyeri County		5	
Outspan Hospital, The	Nyeri; 0°24′59″S 36°57′01″E	Nyeri County	1998	4	250
P.C.E.A. Kikuyu Hospital (Note: P.C.E.A. stands for Presbyterian Church of East Africa)	Kikuyu; 1°15′54″S 36°40′07″E	Kiambu County	1908	5	218
P.C.E.A. Tumutumu Hospital	Karatina; 0°29′18″S 37°04′49″E	Nyeri County	1909	4	203
Saint Bridget Hospital	Kiambu; 1°09′51″S 36°49′18″E	Kiambu County	2021	5	62
Thika Level 5 Hospital	Thika; 1°02′30″S 37°04′43″E	Kiambu County		5	467
Thika Nursing Home Hospital	Thika; 1°03′34″S 37°07′19″E	Kiambu County	2019	5	150

== Coast Province ==
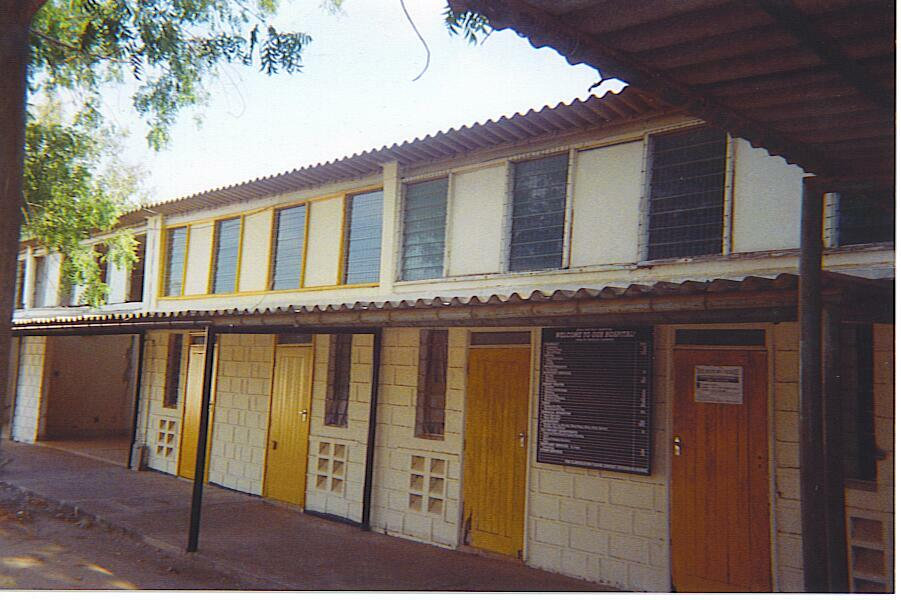
Hola County Referral Hospital

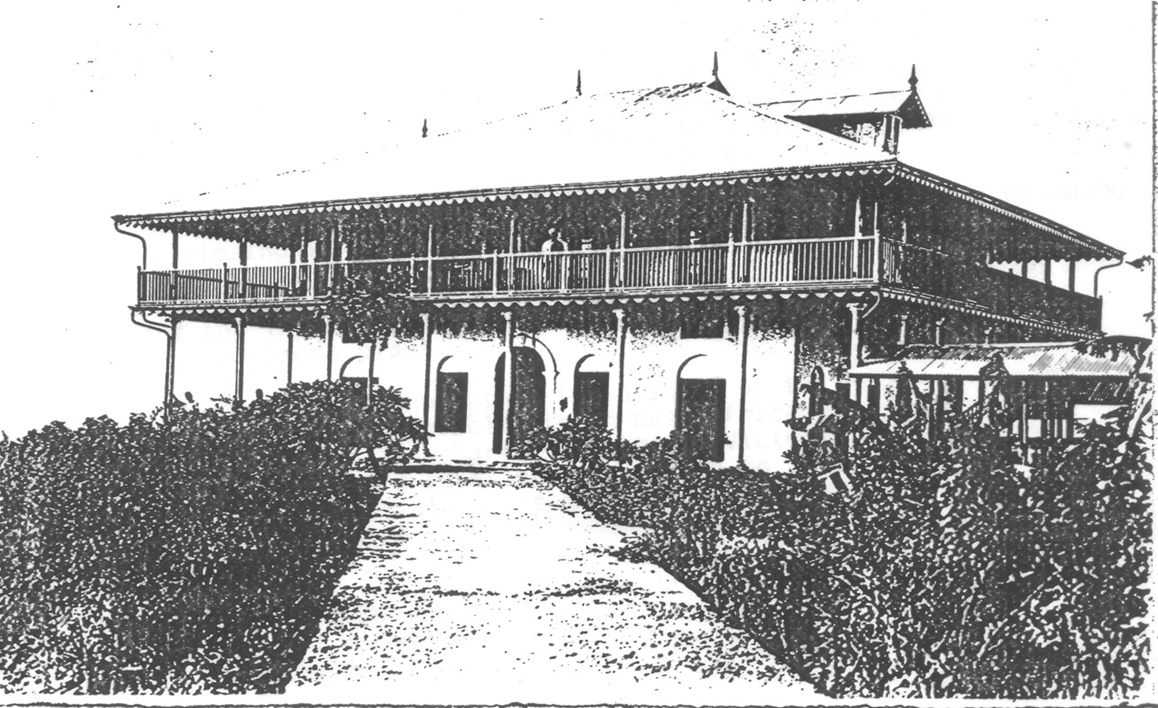
Mombasa Hospital in 1891, aka English Hospital

Hospitals in Coast Province
Name	Locale	Opened	Level	Beds
Afya International Hospital	Malindi; 3°11′49″S 40°06′21″E		4	35
Aga Khan Hospital	Mombasa; 4°04′13″S 39°40′14″E	1944	5	82
Alfarooq Hospital	Mombasa; 4°02′55″S 39°39′55″E	2000		
Bomu Hospital	Changamwe; 4°01′38″S 39°37′03″E	1970s (late)	4	52
Coast Hospice	Mombasa; 4°02′56″S 39°40′18″E	2001		
Coast General Teaching and Referral Hospital	Mombasa; 4°02′53″S 39°40′27″E	1908	5	700
Coast Hospice	Mombasa; 4°02′56″S 39°40′18″E	2001		
Diani Beach Hospital	Diani; 4°16′38″S 39°35′25″E	1997	5	85
Hola County Referral Hospital	Tana River County; 1°29′52″S 40°01′46″E		5	187
MEWA Hospital (Note: MEWA stands for Muslim Education and Welfare Association)	Mombasa; 4°03′10″S 39°39′41″E	1995		60
Mombasa Hospital	Mombasa; 4°03′55″S 39°40′51″E	1891	4	125
Pandya Memorial Hospital	Mombasa	1947		118

== Eastern Province ==
Hospitals in Eastern Province
Name	Locale Coordinate	County	Opened	Level	Beds
Consolata Hospital Nkubu	Nkubu; 0°04′11″S 37°40′00″E	Meru	1949	5	270
Embu Provincial General Hospital	Embu; 0°31′21″S 37°27′11″E	Embu	1925	5	618
Galaxy Hospital	0°22′48″N 37°34′34″E	Isiolo		5	50
Kitui County Referral Hospital	Kitui; 1°22′12″S 38°00′45″E	Kitui		5	204
Machakos Hospital	Machakos; 1°31′09″S 37°16′14″E	Machakos	1922	5	507
Makueni County Referral Hospital	Wote; 1°47′01″S 37°37′40″E	Makueni		5	126
Maua Methodist Hospital	Maua; 0°13′51″N 37°56′31″E	Meru	1928	5	275
Meru Teaching and Referral Hospital	North Imenti Constituency; 0°03′05″N 37°39′14″E	Meru		5	306
Our Lady of Lourdes Mutomo Hospital	Mutomo; 1°50′55″S 38°12′38″E	Kitui	1964	5	140
PCEA Chogoria Hospital	Chogoria; 0°13′49″S 37°37′41″E	Tharaka-Nithi	1922	5	312
The Fork Hospital	1°25′16″S 37°01′14″E	Machakos		5	73

== North Eastern Province ==
Hospitals in the former North Eastern Province
Name	Locale Coordinate	County	Former Province	Opened	Level	Beds
Mandera County Referral Hospital	Mandera; 3°56′28″N 41°51′42″E	Mandera County	North Eastern		4	125
Shamaal Hospital	Mandera; 3°56′18″N 41°51′46″E	Mandera County	North Eastern		5	40

== Nyanza Province ==
Hospitals in former Nyanza Province
Name	Locale Coordinate	County	Former Province	Opened	Level	Beds
Aga Khan Hospital	Kisumu; 0°05′55″S 34°45′22″E	Kisumu County	Nyanza	1957	5	70
Avenue Hospital, Kisumu	Kisumu; 0°05′27″S 34°46′04″E	Kisumu County	Nyanza	2013	4	70
Bosongo Hospital	Kisii; 0°40′37″S 34°46′47″E	Kisii County	Nyanza		5	130
Jaramogi Oginga Odinga Teaching & Referral Hospital (Note: The Jaramogi Oginga Odinga Teaching & Referral Hospital was previously known as the New Nyanza Provincial General Hospital and later Nyanza Provincial General Hospital. The current hospital was built by the Russians during the Cold War and opened in 1969.)	Kisumu; 0°05′20″S 34°46′18″E	Kisumu County	Nyanza	1900s (early)	5	461
Kilimani Hospital	Kisumu; 0°06′16″S 34°45′36″E	Kisumu County	Nyanza	2014		
Kisii Teaching and Referral Hospital (Note: Kisii Teaching and Referral Hospital was formerly Kisumu District Hospital until 2007)	Kisii; 0°40′14″S 34°46′17″E	Kisii County	Nyanza	1916	6	650
Kendu Adventist Hospital	0°24′05″S 34°39′53″E	Homa Bay County	Nyanza	1925	4	104
Port Florence Hospital	Kisumu; 0°06′14″S 34°45′09″E	Kisumu	Nyanza		4	64
St. Joseph's Nyabondo Mission Hospital	Nyabondo; 0°22′53″S 34°58′44″E	Kisumu County	Nyanza		5	250

== Rift Valley Province ==
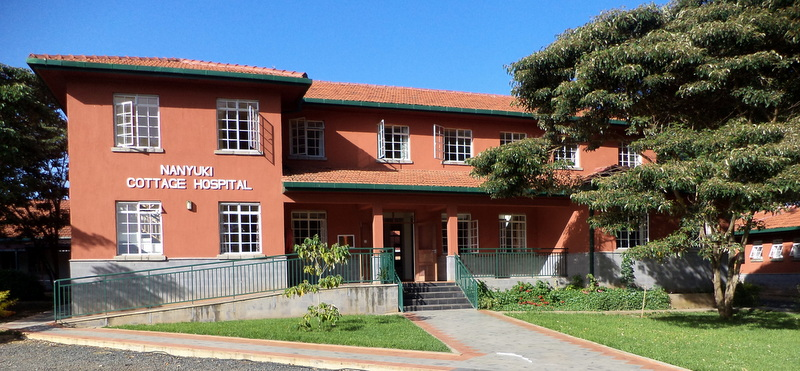
Nanyuki Cottage Hospital

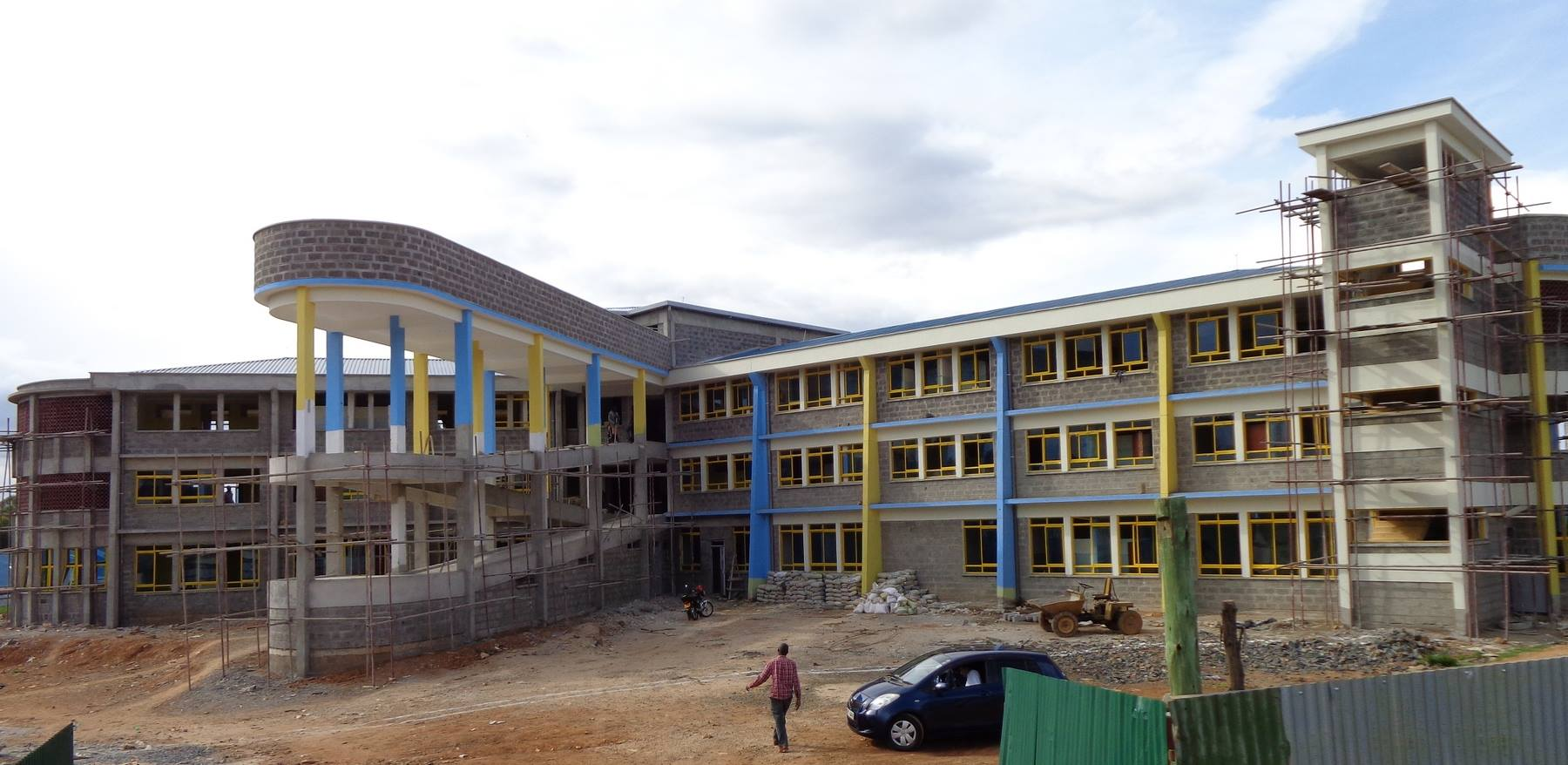
Shoe4Africa Children's Hospital

Hospitals in the former Rift Valley Province/Central Region
Name	Locale Coordinate	County	Former Province	Opened	Level	Beds
Tenwek Mission Hospital	0°44′38″S 35°21′35″E	Bomet County	Rift	1937	6	361
Barnet Memorial Hospital, Kabarnet	0°29′40″N 35°44′30″E	Baringo County	Rift	1997		
Nakuru Level 6 Hospital	Nakuru	Nakuru County	Rift	1906	6	588
Nanyuki Cottage Hospital	Nanyuki; 0°00′11″N 37°04′43″E	Laikipia County	Rift	1957		50
St Mary's Mission Hospital, Gilgil	Gilgil; 0°24′52″S 36°15′00″E	Nakuru County	Rift			
AIC-CURE Children's Hospital (Note: AIC-CURE is a combination of Africa Inland Church and CURE International.)	Kijabe; 0°56′49″S 36°35′38″E	Kiambu County	Rift	1998		30
Mediheal Hospital and Fertility Center	Eldoret; 0°30′29″N 35°17′43″E	Uasin Gishu County	Rift	2002	6	90
Narok County Referral Hospital	Narok; 1°05′03″S 35°52′02″E	Narok County	Rift		4	155
Shoe4Africa Children's Hospital	Eldoret; 0°30′37″N 35°16′49″E	Uasin Gishu County	Rift	2012		200
Pine Breeze Hospital; Nakuru Hospital	Nakuru; 0°16′35″S 36°04′12″E	Nakuru County	Rift	1997	5	
Moi Teaching and Referral Hospital	Eldoret; 1°N 38°E	Uasin Gishu County	Rift	1916	6	819
Eldoret Oncology Associates Cancer Hospital	Eldoret; 0°30′48″N 35°16′58″E	Uasin Gishu County	Rift	2018		
Catholic Hospital Wamba	Wamba; 0°58′40″N 37°19′06″E	Samburu County	Rift	1969	4	200
Nanyuki Teaching and Referral Hospital	Nanyuki	Laikipia County	Rift	1930	5	
Nyahururu County Referral Hospital	Nyahururu	Laikipia County	Rift	1928		

== Western Province ==
Hospitals in the former Western Province
Name	Locale/Coordinate	County	former Province	Opened	Level	Beds
Bungoma County Referral Hospital	Bungoma; 0°34′24″N 34°33′37″E	Bungoma County	Western		4	223
Busia County Referral Hospital	Busia; 0°27′37″N 34°06′17″E	Busia County	Western		4	210
Maxcure Hospitals Ltd, Kisumu	Mega CIty Mall, Nairobi Road, Kisumu; 0°06′26″S 34°46′12″E	Kisumu County	Western	16 June 2021	5	80
Friends Church Sabatia Eye Hospital	Chavakali Market, Kisumu; 0°07′19″N 34°47′15″E	Kisumu County	Western		5	33
Holy Family Nangina Mission Hospital	Funyula Constituency; 0°16′39″N 34°06′18″E	Busia County	Western		4	100
Jumuia Friends Hospital Kaimosi	Kaimosi; 0°07′34″N 34°50′44″E	Vihiga County	Western		4	100
Kakamega County General Teaching & Referral Hospital	0°16′28″N 34°45′35″E	Kakamega County	Western		5	449
Kory Family Hospital	Kimilili; 0°34′52″N 34°33′30″E	Bungoma County	Western	2015	4	74
Lifecare Hospitals Bungoma	Bungoma; 0°33′56″N 34°33′53″E	Bungoma County	Western		5	105
Vihiga County Referral Hospital (Note: Vihiga Country Referral Hospital was formerly known as Vihiga District Hospital)	Maragoli; 0°04′45″N 34°43′21″E	Vihiga County	Western		5	160

== See also ==
- Healthcare in Kenya
- Counties of Kenya

== Notes ==
Counties of Kenya
