= 2026 Utumishi Girls' Academy fire =

School building fire in Kenya

Coordinates: 0°28′46″S 36°19′38″E

Utumishi Girls' Academy fire
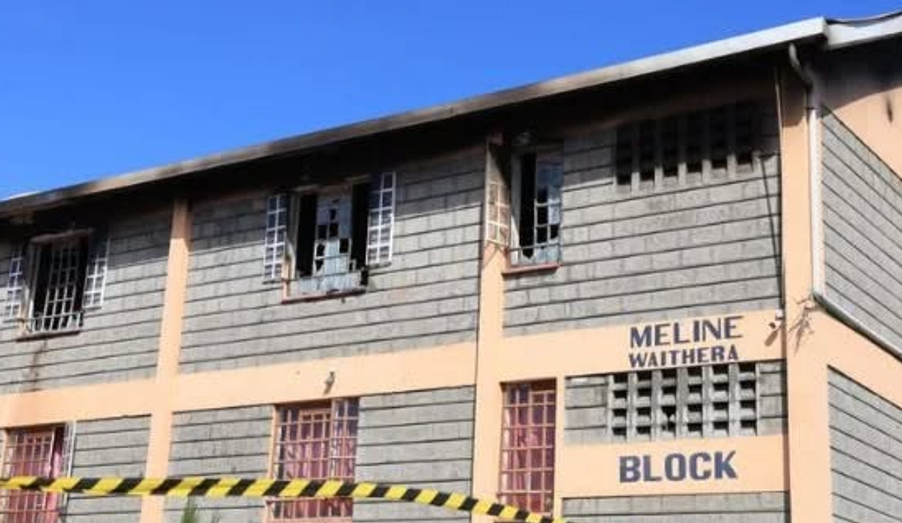
- The dormitory after the fire.
- Location: Utumishi Girls Academy, Gilgil, Nakuru County, Kenya
- Date: 28 May 2026
- Attack type: Suspected arson
- Deaths: 16
- Injuries: 79
- Accused: 8 students

On the night of 28 May 2026, a dormitory fire broke out at Utumishi Girls' Academy, a boarding secondary school in Gilgil, Nakuru County, Kenya; 16 students died and 79 others were injured. The fire occurred at the Meline Waithera boarding dormitory housing 220 students. Following an investigation involving witness interviews and CCTV footage analysis, eight students were initially arrested over alleged involvement in a suspected arson attack.

== Background ==
=== History of school fires in Kenya ===
School fires have been a recurring problem in Kenya, particularly at boarding schools. Many previous incidents have been linked to arson by students protesting school discipline or living conditions, while others have been attributed to accidental causes.

Kenya's deadliest school fire occurred in 2001 in Machakos County, when 67 students died after a dormitory was deliberately set alight.

In 2021, the Ministry of Education reported 126 incidents of school arson between January and November 2020.

A 2024 assessment by Kenya's Ministry of Education found that many schools failed to comply with fire-safety standards. The review cited dormitories with barred windows, single exits, inward-opening doors and overcrowding. Following the assessment, the ministry ordered the closure of 348 schools.

=== Utumishi Girls' Academy ===
Utumishi Girls Academy is a girls' boarding secondary school in Gilgil, Nakuru County. It is located around 120 kilometres (75 mi) northwest of Nairobi. The school is sponsored by the Kenya Police Service and many of its students are children of police officers. Police stated that the fire originated on the first floor of the two-storey Meline Waithera dormitory.

== Fire ==
The fire broke out 10 minutes after midnight on 28 May 2026 on the first-floor dormitory while some students were asleep. CCTV footage showed five girls stealthily walking in the first floor dormitory cubicles (cubes) 11 and 13, allegedly to confirm that their school mates were asleep. Footage appears to show them running away from a fire they ignited. Seconds later, two girls allegedly ignited a kerosene fire and threw it inside one cubicle before moving to the adjacent cubicle, where they replicated their actions. The suspected arsonists are shown escaping to the ground floor shortly after. According to officials, about 220 students were in the dormitory at the time. Students sleeping in the top floor were unable to escape as the only door was made inaccessible by the fire, preventing them from using the only staircase. According to Citizen TV, nine bodies were found at the door.

The dormitory housed 220 students and contained 135 bunk beds. Emergency response teams extinguished the blaze at approximately 03:00 local time.

808 students were at the school at the time of the incident. During the evacuation, several students sustained injuries while attempting to escape. Witnesses reported that some students jumped from upper-floor windows after becoming trapped inside the building.

Police commander Masoud Mwinyi stated that some students fled into nearby areas during the confusion and were still being traced on the morning following the fire.

== Casualties ==
Sixteen students died and 79 others were injured in the fire. The corpses were burnt to the extent that some remains were in the form of ash.

Most of the injured students were treated and discharged from hospital shortly after the incident. Seven students with more serious injuries were hospitalised at Kenyatta National Hospital.

The 16 bodies were transferred to the Naivasha Sub-county Referral Hospital Mortuary for preservation, autopsies and formal identification through DNA fingerprinting. DNA results were released on 6 June, with all victims positively identified. Some families complained about not having the corpses released as soon as possible for funerals. A mother termed the compulsory Mass for the dead as unnecessary and insensitive. Only the body of a Muslim girl was released immediately for an Islamic funeral, all other corpses were detained at the mortuary and only given to their respective families after the 12 June Mass.

== Investigation ==
The National Police Service launched an investigation into the cause of the fire. Investigators conducted interviews with students, teachers and other witnesses and carried out a forensic review of CCTV footage. The investigation is led by Homicide Director Martin Nyagutu.

On 29 May, police announced that eight students had been identified as "persons of interest" in connection with the planning and execution of a suspected arson attack. The students were traced to their homes or located within the surrounding area and detained for questioning. They were among thirty students who were initially recalled by detectives as part of the investigation.

Of the eight, six were confirmed to have appeared in the CCTV video and were arrested. The seventh student confirmed to appear in the footage had been released, she was later re-arrested. The eighth suspect did not appear in the footage and was released.

The seven were arraigned at the Naivasha law courts on 2 June where they were expected to face arson charges.

By 3 June, there were nine students identified as persons of interest. On 3 June, the Naivasha Chief Magistrate, Abdulqadir Ramadhan Lorot ordered the 21 day detention of the nine suspects pending the decision by the Directorate of Criminal Investigations on whether or not they would be charged. He ordered their detention at Nakuru Children Remand Home, prevented the publication of their pictures and stated that the paramount reason for denying them bail or bond was to ensure their personal security.

== Trial ==
On 23 June, the Director of Public Prosecutions (DPP) approved the pressing of murder charges against the nine suspects. On the following day, the prosecutor, Emma Bosire, dropped charges against one of the girls due to insufficient evidence linking her to the alleged arson. Chief Magistrate Abdulqadir Ramathan orded her release from custody.

On 24 June, the case was transferred to Nairobi after Emma Bosire said in her application that their physical safety would be at risk were they to remain in Nakuru.

They were transferred to Kabete Children's Home. On 26 June at their first mention, Deputy Registrar Barbara Akinyi ordered that the suspects be taken to Mathari Hospital on 29 June for mental assessments by a child psychiatrist and separately by Childrens' Officers to determine if they were fit to stand trial. She also barred the media from covering the trial. Their second mention was scheduled to be on 1 July, where the suspects were directed to physically appear before judge Diana Kavedza with their guardians and/or parents and childrens' officers present. In the meantime, they would continue to be detained at the Kabete Children's Home.

They were found mentally fit to stand trial and formally charged with sixteen counts of murder on 1 July. Each of the eight girls pleaded not guilty to the charges. They were denied bail. Their next court appearance was on 21 September. They were reportedly bullied while in remand prior to their 21 hearing. They appeared before Justice Diana Kavedza of the High Court on 21 September, where they were denied bail yet again. She reasoned that releasing could "compromise the integrity of the trial and undermine the administration of justice". She ruled that they would be held at Kamae Girls Borstal Institution, housed in the Kamiti Maximum Prison complex. Each girl will be given an individual sleeping space (cubicle and bed), reading material and medical attention with monitoring from a children's officer. Their parents will be allowed to contact them once a month.

During a 26 October court mention, it was revealed that two of the girls were pursuing plea bargains.

== Aftermath ==
Following the fire, parents and relatives gathered at the school seeking information about students affected by the incident. Security around the school was increased as crowds assembled demanding information and accountability.

Interior Cabinet Secretary Kipchumba Murkomen visited the school and offered condolences to the families of those who died. He urged the public to avoid speculation while investigations were underway.

Education Minister Julius Ogamba announced that preliminary findings had identified multiple breaches of safety regulations at the school. According to the ministry, the dormitory was overcrowded and one exit door had been locked, contrary to established safety requirements.

Ogamba dissolved the school's board of management and ordered action against the principal. He stated that disciplinary and legal measures would be taken against individuals found to have failed in their responsibilities.

The school principal, Joycelene Muraguri was placed on compulsory leave and a new one, Ms Rufina Nkonge, was appointed to replace her.

In late June, the school principal sent letters to parents informing them of the school's reopening beginning 30 June. Parents criticized the planned move and demanded that safety measures must be met by all dorms and facilities; accountability from those involved in circumstances that led to the fire; professional counselling for all students and concise explanations on dorm emergency exits. Parents threatened to not present their daughters for the reopening if their concerns were not met. Following an 8 hour 30 June meeting attended by parents, school officials, and education authorities, it was resolved for the reopening to begin on 2 July. Reopening would still take place in phases starting with Form Fours on 2 July followed by others on 6 July.

== Burials ==
The first victim to be buried was Zuhura Rama on 7 June at Ukunda, Msambweni Sub-County, Kwale County. A Mass for the dead was held on 12 June at Gilgil Stadium. The second was Jane Kimani who was buried on 12 June after the mass. The third victim (Note: Although The Star says she was the second to be buried, one girl was buried on the previous day; making Cecelia the third) was Cecilia Wanjiku who had initially made it safely outside the dormitory but went back inside in an attempt to save her fellow dorm-mates. According to former Governor Mike Sonko, who described her as a heroine, she died after she returned to the dorm. She was buried in Olkalau, Nyandarua County on 13 June. Nine victims were buried on 13 June in different counties. On 16 June 2026, two of the last victims were buried; 17-year-old Form Four Imani Boit, who desired to become a lawyer in Baringo West, and Grade 10 Fortune Mungoma, who desired to become a veterinarian in Turkana West. The final victim to be buried, was Neema Wairimu Murigi; her burial took place on 17 June at Ruai, Nairobi.

== Safety concerns ==
The fire renewed public debate about safety standards in Kenyan boarding schools. Parents and members of the public questioned whether dormitories complied with fire-safety regulations and whether schools were adequately prepared for emergencies.

School fires have frequently been associated with overcrowding, blocked exits and failures to follow fire-safety guidelines. The Utumishi Girls' Academy fire occurred amid continuing concerns about safety in Kenyan boarding schools following several fatal dormitory fires in previous years.

== Related accident ==
On 28 May, parents of an Utumishi Girls' Academy student on their way to see and collect their daughter after the fire were involved in a car accident. The mother, Irene Faith Koskei, died and her husband was seriously injured. She was buried on 13 June in Nakuru Town West Constituency.
