= Wamba =

Wamba may refer to:

== People ==
- Wamba (c. 630 – c. 688), king of the Visigoths on the Iberian peninsula
- Ernest Wamba dia Wamba (1942–2020), Senator and former rebel leader in the Democratic Republic of the Congo
- Anaclet Wamba (born 1960), Congolese-French professional boxer
- Philippe Wamba (1971–2002), African-American writer
- Wamba the jester, a minor character in Ivanhoe (1819)

== Places ==
- Wamba, Luo Reserve, a village in the Luo Reserve, Democratic Republic of the Congo
- Wamba, Haut-Uele, a town in the Haut-Uele Province of the Democratic Republic of the Congo
- Wamba Territory, an administrative area of the Haut-Uele Province of the Democratic Republic of the Congo
- Roman Catholic Diocese of Wamba, Democratic Republic of the Congo
- Wamba, Kenya, a small town in Samburu District, Rift Valley Province in central Kenya
- Wamba Hospital, a hospital in Wamba, Samburu District, Kenya
- Wamba, Nigeria, a Local Government Area of Nasarawa State
- Wamba, Valladolid, a municipality in the province of Valladolid, Castille and León, Spain
- Wamba River, river in Angola and DR Congo

== Other uses ==
- Wamba (spider), a genus of spiders
- Wamba (social network)
- Wamba, a Child of the Jungle, a 1913 silent film
- Wemba-Wemba or Wamba-Wamba, an Australian Aboriginal people
  - Wemba Wemba language
