= World Trade Centre Hospital =

Private hospital in Kenya

Do not confuse with MP Shah Hospital

== World Trade Centre Hospital ==
World Trade Centre Hospital
- MTZ Holdings Limited

Geography
- Location: Nairobi, Kenya
- Coordinates: 01°18′25″S 36°44′25″E

Organisation
- Care system: Private
- Type: General

Services
- Beds: 150

History
- Opened: 2027 Expected

Links
- Other links: List of hospitals in Kenya; Healthcare in Kenya

World Trade Centre Hospital (WTCH), is a planned private medical facility in Kenya. The owners of this medical facility are members of the family of Suresh Bhagwanji Raja Shah, the founder of I&M Holdings Limited, a financial services conglomerate based in Kenya, with subsidiaries in Kenya, Mauritius, Tanzania, Rwanda, Uganda and an office in the United Kingdom.

== Overview ==
The WTCH is a private for-profit hospital with planned capacity of 150 inpatient beds. The hospital is intended to cater to healthcare needs of the growing middle class in the city of Nairobi, the capital of Kenya.

== Location ==
The hospital will occupy 2.5 acres (1.0 ha) in Nairobi Business Park, on Ngong Road, adjacent to Ngong Race Course and Golf Park, in the western suburbs of Nairobi City. This is approximately 11 kilometres (7 mi) west of the city's central business district.

== Developers ==
The developers of this hospital are organized in a joint venture company called MTZ Holdings Limited. The shareholding in MTZ is as depicted in the table below. The entities listed in the table jointly own approximately 60 percent of the stock of I&M Holdings Limited, whose shares trade on the Nairobi Securities Exchange under the symbol: IMHL.

Shareholding In MTZ Holdings Limited
| Rank | Shareholder | Domicile | Percentage | Notes |
|---|---|---|---|---|
| 1 | Minard Holdings Limited | Kenya | | |
| 2 | Tecoma Limited | Kenya | | |
| 3 | Ziyungi Limited | Kenya | | |

== Developments ==
In January 2023, MTZ Holdings purchased Nairobi Business Park, measuring 16 acres (6.5 ha) at an undisclosed sum estimated to be more than KSh2 billion (approx. US$16.2 million), at that time. In September 2023, the Business Daily Africa reported that MTZ Holdings planned to build a 150-bed "multispecialty hospital" on 2.5 acres of the site.

The planned hospital comprises two basement floors and six floors above ground for a total of eight floors. The construction of the hospital is budgeted at KSh3.24 billion (approx. US$22.1 million).

== See also ==
- List of hospitals in Kenya
- Karen Hospital
