= Elkana Ong'esa =

Kenyan sculptor and artist (1944–2024)

- Born: 1944; Tabaka, Kisii, Kenya
- Died: November 28, 2024 (aged 79–80); Kisii Teaching and Referral Hospital
- Education: Makerere University, McGill University
- Spouse: Elvinah Ong'esa

Elkana Ong’esa (1944-2024) was a Kenyan soapstone carver. He is considered one of Kenya's most lauded sculptors, and his work is featured outside of buildings across the globe, such as the Coca-Cola headquarters in Atlanta, Georgia, the UNESCO headquarters in Paris, France, and the United Nations Headquarters in New York.

== Early life and education ==
Ong’esa was born in 1944 in Tabaka, a region in Kisii, Kenya famous for soapstone carving. He was introduced to carving as a child when his father created a car for him. That inspired him to start working with various materials like clay and small pieces of stone, and he learned how to use his fingers to work with tools. As a young person, he liked carving birds.

Ong’esa’s uncle, Alexander Mugundy, an artist who made figurines with naturalistic kinds of expressions instead of functional objects like bowls, candlesticks and vases, helped shape Ong’esa’s ideas away from traditional sculpting. Ong'esa began developing a more modern sculpting style and made abstract art and bigger forms.

After receiving an award upon entering an art competition in 1965, his teacher Ms. Janet Green proceeded to assist him to form an art club at his school, where he was appointed chairman. This would also see him drop his ambition of becoming a doctor. After high school, a letter arrived from the ministry of Local Government in Nairobi inviting Ong'esa to study accounting. He was just about to leave for Nairobi when a letter arrived at his secondary school, informing him that he had won a place at Makerere University.

Ong'esa went on to get his bachelor’s degree from Makerere University in Kampala, Uganda where he studied painting and sculpting at Margaret Trowel School of Fine Arts. Margaret Trowell, the pioneer of the Art School, had established a tradition of making field trips to schools in Kenya, spotting talent and scouting possible recruits. That is how Ong'esa was recruited.

In art school, he learned about materials and techniques that weren't part of the traditional culture he’d grown up in. He also learned modeling, printing and how to work with ceramics and glass. After his Fine Arts degree from Makerere, Ong'esa taught Art at Kisii High School. He obtained his Master of Education degree in Teaching of Arts from McGill University in Canada in 1985.

== Career ==
Ong’esa has made numerous stone sculptures using the Kisii soapstone. His gigantic stone creations are displayed across the globe, and his works have been exhibited in numerous venues, such as the United Nations in New York, and numerous art galleries across the world.

Ong’esa’s work is inspired by nature and often features symbols from African myths and songs. His giant granite sculpture gracing the UNESCO headquarters in Paris is known as Enyamuchera (“singing bird” in the Kisii language) and has its origins in the fiscal shrike, a black and white bird native to Sub-Saharan Africa. Another one of his works, inspired by Kenya’s post-election violence, shows scenes of destruction, devastation and despair following the disputed Kenyan elections in late 2007, forever captured in a wooden sculpture.

Ong'esa's 13-tonne granite sculpture, Hands off our Elephants, was to headline the Kenya exhibition at the 2014 Smithsonian Folklife Festival in Washington DC. An interested buyer had even offered Sh1.2 billion (then equivalent to $13.8 million) for the sculpture. Unfortunately, the Kenyan authorities who insisted on handling transport for the 13-tonne elephant, eventually said that it was too heavy to be airlifted.

Onge'sa also worked as an art teacher. He taught overseas for many years and then returned to teach at his hometown of Kisii, where he worked as a Senior Lecturer for Creative Arts at the Kisii Teachers College. He also helped establish his own art school in the Kisii region, so that local artists here would learn how entrepreneurship and be able to support themselves through art.

== Awards ==
Onge'sa received his first award in 1965 at 21 years of age when, at the encouragement of his teacher of English, Ms. Janet Green, he entered an art competition organized by the Kenya Freedom from Hunger Campaign to commemorate its achievements since independence. Ongesa’s submission to the competition was his very first soapstone carving titled Daily Bread. It depicted a human eating maize on the cob. It scooped the first prize in the sculptors’ category. As the prize for winning, he received a pocket-size Toshiba transistor radio. Ong'esa then sold Daily Bread to an American student who was doing dissertation research in Kisii. He would later reunite with his earliest sculpture at the 2014 Smithsonian Folklife Festival, almost fifty years later, during a chance meeting with Sarah Nora, the American student who had bought it in 1966.

While at Makerere University, Ong'esa received numerous awards. The first one, Sculptor of the Year, came through his all-time favorite carving of a man landing on the moon—now standing at an FBI building in the United States—while he was still a first-year student.

== Personal life ==
In October 2021, Ong'esa lost his wife, Elvinah, who had been ailing for years. He sought counsel and comfort from fellow artists and their experiences of grief. That season produced the piece Lala Toto Lala, a black granite sculpture of a child lying on their mum's bosom, which he said, depicted the relationship he had with his wife. On the back side, the sculpture has a rough texture to show what became of his life after his wife's death.

Ong'esa, who lived in Kapsoya, Eldoret for a while, moved back to his hometown of Tabaka in Kisii to be nearer his studio, and to seek advanced cancer care at Kisii Teaching and Referral Hospital. He died on Thursday, November 28th, 2024.
