= Gikonyo =

Gikonyo is a surname. Notable people with the surname include:

- Betty Gikonyo (born 1950), Kenyan medical entrepreneur, pediatric cardiologist
- Joseph Gikonyo (born 1965), Kenyan sprinter
