= Shoe4Africa Children's Hospital =

Hospital in Eldoret, Kenya

Shoe4Africa Childrens Hospital
- Shoe4Africa

Geography
- Location: Eldoret, Uasin Gishu County, Kenya
- Coordinates: 0.510175°N 35.280140°E

Organisation
- Care system: Public Health Service
- Type: Teaching
- Affiliated university: Moi Teaching and Referral Hospital (MTRH)

Services
- Emergency department: Yes
- Beds: 200
- Speciality: Children's hospital

History
- Opened: August 12th, 2015

Links
- Website: shoe4africa.org/our-hospital/
- Lists: Hospitals in Kenya

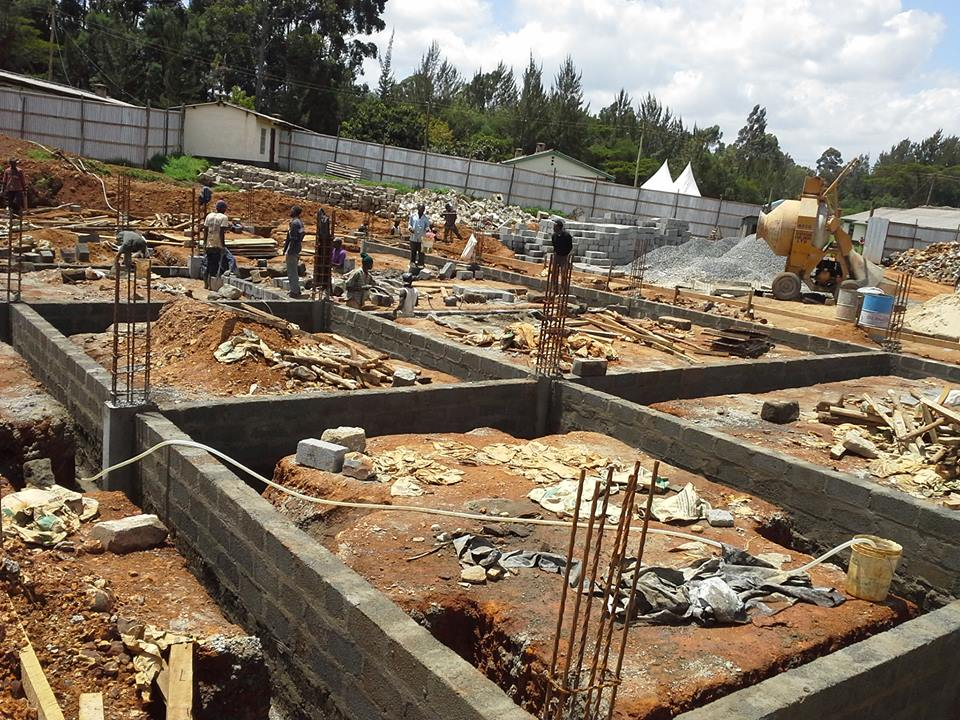
Early Construction Progress

Shoe4Africa Children's Hospital is a public pediatric hospital in Eldoret, Kenya. It was built in 2015. It is the first dedicated public children's hospital in East and Central Africa, and the second in Sub-Saharan Africa, after the Red Cross War Memorial Children's Hospital in Cape Town, which was established in 1956.

The hospital is a major project of Shoe4Africa, a New York-based charity focused on health and education in Eastern Africa. Its construction cost an estimated two billion Kenyan shillings and was partially funded by donations from international celebrities, including Cristiano Ronaldo, Anthony Edwards, and Natalie Portman.

The Shoe4Africa Children's Hospital operates as a teaching hospital in partnership with Moi University. It is governed by the Moi Teaching and Referral Hospital, Kenya's second-largest national hospital, which is built upon the same Government owned land. As of 2024, the hospital treats over 430 inpatients and outpatients daily.

== Construction & expansion ==
Construction of the hospital began in 2013 and was completed on August 12, 2015. The hospital had 105 beds initially, and with funding expanded to 150 beds by 2018.

Construction of the dedicated kitchen facility next to the children's hospital began in 2016 to provide nutrition for malnourished patients.

In 2018, a basketball court was added for patients and medical school students. The charity announced that a soccer pitch would follow to help children with rehabilitation, and in May 2019, an AstroTurf soccer pitch was opened. Later in the year, Kuunga Mkono classrooms were added to the hospital, making it the first hospital in Kenya with children's classrooms inside its complex.

As a result of this expansion, Shoe4Africa announced that it had treated its millionth patient in 2022.

== Planned facilities ==
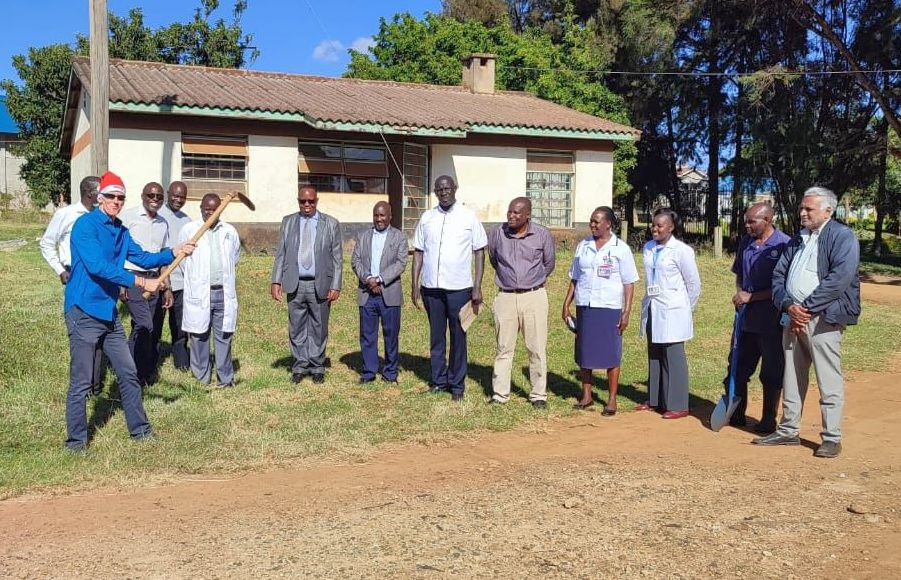

Construction of the Harry J. Dyer Burns Unit, a planned 35-bed center for treating burns, began in December 2023.

Additionally, the construction of the Shoe4Africa Juli Anne Perry Children's Cancer Hospital, a planned 152-bed pediatric cancer hospital to enhance the existing 30-bed ward space, was started in January 2024. Upon completion, it will be located next to the children's facility.
