= Lengusaka =

Coordinates: 0°52′40″N 37°18′58″E

Lengusaka is a small village in Northern Kenya located between Archers Post and Wamba on the C37/C38 road that leads to Maralal, the County Capital, in the Samburu County Highlands. The Samburu people practice pastoralism. Lengusaka is primarily inhabited by shopkeepers who serve the nearby pastoralist community. The seasonal Lengusaka River marks the start of the town on the Archer’s Post Side, and on the Wamba side of town it currently ends a few hundred meters down the road at the Lengusaka Hill.

Lengusaka sits at the edge of the Namunak Conservancy and West Gate Conservancy, the later name referring to the West Gate into the Samburu National Reserve whose main entrance is in Archer’s Post.

Market day is Wednesday and consists of a small cattle market and general merchandise market serving the pastoralist community. Lengusaka is the site of the Samburu Lowland Research Station. The community is growing as economic development comes to this part of Samburu County. Pylons to carry electricity from the massive Lake Turkana Wind Power Station to Nairobi turns into the West Gate Conservancy at the edge of town. Long cut off from the rest of Kenya by bad roads, the Chinese-built tarmac road connecting the Samburu Lowlands to the rest of Kenya now stops only a couple dozen kilometers from Lengusaka.
