= MEWA Hospital =

- Muslim Education and Welfare Association

Geography
- Location: Majengo Musa, Mombasa, Kenya
- Coordinates: 4°03′10″S 39°39′41″E

History
- Opened: 1992

Links
- Website: www.mewahospital.org
- Lists: Hospitals in Kenya

MEWA Hospital is a hospital in Mombasa, Kenya. It is a project of the Muslim Education and Welfare Association (MEWA) and provides in-patient (with a capacity of 60 beds) and out-patient services operating 24 hours a day.
