= Nairobi Women's Hospital =

The Nairobi Women's Hospital

Geography
- Location: Hurlingham, Nairobi, Kenya
- Coordinates: 1°17′38″S 36°47′46″E

Organisation
- Care system: NHIF
- Type: Specialized

Services
- Emergency department: Yes
- Beds: 726

History
- Founded: 2001

Links
- Lists: Hospitals in Kenya

The Nairobi Women's Hospital is a for-profit hospital in Nairobi, Kenya. It has 726 beds.

== History ==
The hospital was founded in 2001 by Dr. Sam Thenya and was the first of its kind in the East and Central Africa region. Even if it specialised in Obstetrics and Gynecology services, the hospital is equipped and staffed to handle all general medical and surgical conditions.

The Gender Violence Recovery Centre (GVRC) is a charitable trust of The Nairobi Women's Hospital. It was established to provide medical treatment, and psychosocial treatment to survivors of rape and domestic violence who cannot afford treatment. GVRCs have been established throughout Kenya and are often the sole available form of treatment for victims of gender-based violence.

== Managements ==
The hospital is for-profit and private equity has been heavily involved in its management. In 2016, the Abraaj Group purchased a 75% stake in the hospital. In 2016 Dr Thenya claimed that requests from politicians seeking to free patients or their bodies detained at the hospital for non-payment were his biggest problem, saying "My biggest problem, and I think this is in the public domain, is politicians calling for release of patients who have not paid their bills or release a body of a someone who has bills." After the Abraaj Group collapsed in 2018, their stake was acquired by the US-based firm TPG Inc.

In 2017 and 2019 the detention of patients and bodies at the hospital over unpaid bills was the subject of Kenyan television exposes.

== Services ==
- Maternity and neonatal care
- Diagnostics and ancillary
- General medicine and surgery
- Specialized clinics.

== Leadership ==
The chief executive director of the hospital is Dr. Samuel Maina Thenya.
