= Lewa Marathon =

Annual endurance race in Kenya

The Lewa Safari Marathon is an annual fundraising event held at Lewa Downs, about 140 miles (230 km) north of Nairobi, Kenya. The 42.195-kilometre (26.219 mi) race is co-sponsored by Safaricom and Huawei Technologies (Kenya) Co. Ltd. Huawei began supporting the Lewa Marathon in 2008. In 2020 it was recognised as a long-term supporter with over 12 years of involvement, and its role was elevated to co-lead sponsor alongside Safaricom when the event was rebranded as "The Lewa Safari Marathon". The race is organised by the Lewa Wildlife Conservancy and Tusk to raise funds for community development and wildlife conservation projects. Runner's World Magazine has described the event as "one of the top ten races to run in your life".

== History ==
Since the first event was held in 2000, the Lewa Marathon has become widely known for its difficult terrain and harsh climate, drawing competitors and spectators from all over the world.

Some of the more notable competitors include 2004 Olympic silver medalist Catherine Ndereba. and former marathon world record holder Paul Tergat. Pippa Middleton ran this race in 2015 as her first full marathon.

The 2020 edition of the race was cancelled due to the coronavirus pandemic, with all registrants having the option of either obtaining a full refund (minus transaction fees) or transferring their entry to 2021.

== Past events ==
The 2026 edition of the Lewa Safari Marathon was held on 27 June 2026. The 2025 edition took place on 28 June 2025 and marked the 25th running of the event.

== Past winners ==
=== Full Marathon ===
Year	Men's winner	Time	Women's winner	Time
2026	Samson Lemayan	2:27:04	Lydia Simiyu	2:50:37
2025	Samson Lemayan	2:28:35	Mercy Kwambai	2:50:12

=== Half Marathon ===
Year	Men's winner	Time	Women's winner	Time
2026	Michael Kamau	1:06:36	Mercy Nelima	1:19:00
2025	Michael Kamau	1:06:37	Lydia Nyansikera	1:19:45

== Course ==
The race takes place on the Lewa wildlife conservancy, a game park that is home a variety of large African wildlife to include lions, elephants, rhinoceros, and the greatly feared cape buffalo. There are no physical barriers separating the runners from the wildlife, making Lewa a unique experience in the running world. The course consists of two 20.0975-kilometre (12.4880 mi) loops that are run on a dirt road that ordinarily serves as a four-wheel drive trail for safari vehicles. The average elevation of the course is 5,500 feet (1,700 m) above sea level. Located within one hundred miles of the equator, the sun can bring afternoon temperature as high as 90 degrees Fahrenheit all year round. The elevation, when combined with the equatorial sun have proven to test even the most seasoned marathon runners.

Running a marathon race on an African wildlife preserve does present some unique security risks. The Lewa Conservancy is host to several large African predators that include lions, leopards, hyenas, wild dogs, and cheetahs. Security patrols of experienced, armed rangers from the Kenya Wildlife Service guard the course to ensure the safety of the runners. In support of ground efforts, two helicopters and one spotter plane keep an eye out for any possible threats.

== Community impact ==
The impact of the Lewa Marathon on the local Kenyan community has become stronger each year. The 2009 event raised approximately $500,000 U.S. dollars that have been distributed to various charitable organizations in support of education, health, community development, and wildlife conservation throughout Kenya. In 2007, over US$60,000 were provided to a local school in order to build and furnish two new classrooms, a library, and a gate for the school compound. Over $30,000 was used to buy medical supplies and equipment such as digital blood pressure machines, stretchers, and beds for local hospitals. Every year, funds from the marathon are allocated to the Nanyuki Cottage Hospital specifically to provide care for animal injury victims.

While the Lewa Marathon gives generously to the surrounding communities of Northern Kenya, its main purpose is to support wildlife conservation. Funds raised from the marathon help support a staff of over 140 armed rangers that protect the animal residents of the Lewa Conservancy. Lewa is the home of over 80 black and white rhinoceros, both of which are endangered. The preserve also boasts a large population of endangered Grevy's zebra.
