= J. C. Carothers =

British psychiatrist

John Colin Dixon Carothers (18 October 1903, Simon's Town, South Africa - 13 December 1989, Bedhampton, England) was a British psychiatrist known for his controversial views on African mental health. He played a key role in the British repression of the Mau Mau rebellion.

== Early life and career ==
Colin Carothers was born in South Africa and came to England at the age of four. He was educated at The Portsmouth Grammar School, and qualified at St Thomas' Hospital in 1926. After a period in general practice, in 1929 he was appointed Medical Officer to the East African Medical Service and spent nine years in Kenya, before returning to England to study psychiatry. He obtained the Diploma in Psychological Medicine in 1946, after a period of training at the Maudsley Hospital. Dr Carothers returned to Africa to take up an appointment as Medical Officer in charge of the Mathari Mental Hospital in Nairobi. It was during the 12 years there that he became the Psychiatric Specialist to the East African Medical Service. In addition he assisted the East Africa Command with handling the psychiatric problems within the Armed Services during World War II. For most of this period he was also in medical charge of HM Prison, Nairobi.

In 1951 Carothers left Africa and returned to the United Kingdom, where he began work at St James' Hospital, Portsmouth. It was during the following years that he began to develop and articulate his thoughts about African mental health. In 1951 he published The Frontal Lobe and the African, in which he argued that “the African was developmentally child-like owing to underdeveloped frontal lobes that result in an effective leucotomy.”

At the request of the World Health Organization, he published a monograph entitled The African Mind in Health and Disease. Carothers’ work was not received positively by many of his contemporaries. Experts from psychiatry and anthropology responded to the WHO monograph in scathing reviews in various prominent journals, with some referring directly to his views on racial and biological determinism; Carothers continued to cite his own frontal lobe theory in his later works.

== Mau Mau rebellion ==
In 1954 Carothers was invited back by the Kenyan Government, to assist it in countering the Mau Mau rebellion. This work resulted in a second paper, The Psychology of Mau-Mau, appearing as a Government White Paper in 1955. His analysis guided British psychological warfare, which painted Mau Mau as "an irrational force of evil, dominated by bestial impulses and influenced by world communism".

== Later career ==
He was appointed a consultant at St James' Hospital, Portsmouth, in 1959, and in the same year, wrote a paper, Culture, Psychiatry and the Written Word. Reading this paper prompted Marshall McLuhan to write his own paper on technological trauma, The Gutenberg Galaxy, and McLuhan wrote to Carothers acknowledging this intellectual debt. The culmination of his thinking was expressed in The Mind of Man in Africa, prepared during the early years of his retirement, and published in 1972. Carothers was elected to the Fellowship of the College of Psychiatrists in 1973.

Carothers believed that societies, like developing human individuals, move through a phase where the power of the spoken word gradually gives way to the authority of the written word. He saw that the rural Africans were living in world of sound, in which the dynamic, spoken word retained its magic, whereas in Western society, children move rapidly to a visual world as they learn to read. He linked what he termed this mental immaturity with the hysterical patterns he claimed were seen more commonly in African than European women, and the psychopathic traits he believed to be more common in African men than in Europeans. These ideas were set out in his last published article Hysteria, Psychopathy and the Magic Word, in 1975.

== Personal life ==
Carothers was married in Marylebone in 1933 to Diana May Bagnall (1905-1998) with whom he had two daughters and a son. He was a prolific artist, and his oil paintings, mainly landscapes, were exhibited both locally and at the Royal Academy of Arts.

== Publications ==
- A Study of Mental Derangement in Africans, and an Attempt to Explain its Peculiarities, More Especially in Relation to the African Attitude to Life, Journal of Mental Science, Volume 93, Issue 392, July 1947, pp.548-597 DOI: https://doi.org/10.1192/bjp.93.392.548
- Frontal Lobe Function and the African, Journal of Mental Science, Volume 97, Issue 406, January 1951, pp. 12 - 48 DOI: https://doi.org/10.1192/bjp.97.406.
- The African mind in health and disease: a study in ethnopsychiatry, World Health Organization monograph series; no. 17, 1953
- The Psychology of Mau Mau, Colony and Protectorate of Kenya, 1955
- Culture, Psychiatry and the Written Word, Psychiatry Vol. 22, Iss. 4, (Nov 1, 1959) p.307
- Hysteria, Psychopathy and the Magic Word, Mankind Quarterly Vol. 16, Iss. 2, (Oct 1, 1975) p.93

== See also ==
- Cross-cultural psychiatry
- Frantz Fanon
- Octave Mannoni
