= National Spinal Injury Referral Hospital =

- Ministry of Health (Kenya)

Geography
- Location: Kilimani, Nairobi County, Kenya
- Coordinates: 1°17′17″S 36°47′38″E

Organisation
- Type: Specialist

Services
- Standards: Level 6
- Beds: 35
- Speciality: Spinal cord injury

History
- Opened: 1941

Links
- Lists: Hospitals in Kenya

The National Spinal Injury Referral Hospital(NSIRH) is located in Nairobi on Lenana Rd. The NSIRH offers specialized healthcare services to persons with spinal injuries . It has a capacity of 35 beds. The core mandate of the NSIRH is to rehabilitate spinal injury patients referred from public and private institutions from the country and even neighboring countries.

== History ==
The referral hospital was built in World War II to serve injured soldiers. It was originally known as the Amani Cheshire Home. named for the donor of the original structure.

== See also ==
- Healthcare in Kenya
