= Karen Hospital =

Private hospital in Nairobi, Kenya

Geography
- Location: Karen, Nairobi, Kenya
- Coordinates: 01°20′10″S 36°43′34″E

Organisation
- Care system: Private
- Type: General Medical Services.

Services
- Emergency department: Yes
- Beds: 102

History
- Opened: January 1, 2006; 19 years ago

Links
- Website: Homepage
- Other links: List of hospitals in Kenya

The Karen Hospital is a private, multi-specialty hospital located in the Karen suburb of Nairobi, Kenya's capital city. The hospital has an in-patient bed capacity of 102.

== Location ==
The hospital is located in the suburb of Karen off of Nairobi-Langata road, approximately 17 kilometres (11 mi), southwest of the city's central business district. The geographical coordinates of this hospital are: 01°20'10.0"S, 36°43'34.0"E (Latitude:-1.336111; Longitude:36.726111).

== Overview ==
The hospital offers several specialized services in the areas of internal medicine, pediatrics and surgery, including: (i) Wellness Programs (ii) Day Surgery (iii) Wound Care (iv) Dental Services (v) Cardiac Services (vi) General Surgery (vii) Orthopaedic and Spine Surgery (viii) Gastroenterology (ix) Ear, Nose and Throat (ENT) services (x) Paediatrics, among others.

The Kenya Ministry of Health classifies the hospital as a "Level 6" facility on account of the multitude and complexity of services on offer and due to the fact that the hospital serves as a teaching facility.

== History ==
Karen Hospital was co-founded by a Kenyan medical couple one of whom is Dr. Betty Gikonyo, a pediatric cardiologist, who is one of the 13 female doctors (8 African and 5 Caucasians), to graduate with the Bachelor of Medicine and Bachelor of Surgery (MBChB) from the Nairobi University School of Medicine in 1975. The other member of the couple is her husband, Dr. Daniel Gikonyo an adult cardiologist, whose practice is based at the hospital. Karen Hospital cost US$14 million to build, funded with an US$8 million mortgage from Kenya Commercial Bank.

For the first 14 years, Betty Gikonyo served as the hospital's chief executive officer (CEO). In 2020 she transitioned to serving as the hospital's chairperson, making room for her daughter, Juliet Gikonyo Nyaga, a public health specialist, to assume the role of CEO.

== Governance ==
As of September 2023, the hospital is governed by a nine-person board of directors. The list below names the members of the board.

1. Betty Muthoni Gikonyo: Chairperson
2. Daniel Gikonyo: Director, Chief of Cardiology
3. Juliet Gikonyo Nyaga: Chief Executive Officer
4. Anthony Gikonyo: Medical Director
5. Sheila Macharia: Director, Chair Board HR Committee
6. Timothy Kabiru: Director, Chair Board Finance & Procurement Committee
7. Michael Kimani: Director, Chair Board Audit & Risk Committee
8. Ngugi Mwangi: Director
9. Robinson Mumenya: Director, Chair Board Medical Advisory Committee.

== See also ==
- List of hospitals in Kenya
- World Trade Centre Hospital
