= Betty Gikonyo =

Kenyan medical entrepreneur and pediatric cardiologist

Betty Muthoni Gikonyo
- Born: 27 May 1950 (age 76); Kiamabara, Nyeri County, Kenya
- Education: University of Nairobi (MBChB); Daystar University (MBA)
- Occupations: Pediatrician; Cardiologist; Entrepreneur; Medical Administrator; Businesswoman
- Years active: 1981–present
- Known for: Pediatric cardiology and Entrepreneurship
- Title: Co-founder Karen Hospital. Chairperson of Karen Hospital Board of Directors and Consultant Pediatric Cardiologist.

Betty Mūthoni Gìkonyo (born 27 May 1950) is a Kenyan medical entrepreneur, pediatric cardiologist and one of the country's best known healthcare professionals. She has been featured on CNN's African Voices

Gìkonyo is a co-founder and the chairperson of the Karen Hospital. From 2006 until 2020, she was Chief Executive Officer at the Karen Hospital in Nairobi, Kenya.

== Early life and education ==
Gìkonyo was born on 27 May 1950 in the village of Kìamabara, near the town of Karatina, in Nyeri County. She came from a poor family and wore her first shoes at the age of 13.

She attended Alliance Girls High School. Her first job was at the Kenya Railways and Harbors, before she joined the university. She earned KSh. 700/= per month, which was a sizable amount for her, considering that her school pocket money was 20/=.

Her first major medical encounter was when her mother was diagnosed with cancer when Gìkonyo was 14 years old. However, her biggest inspiration to pursue a medical career came from her elder brother, Dr Wallace Kahūgū, because her mother spoke highly of him.

Gìkonyo went on to attend the University of Nairobi School of Medicine, where she received a Bachelor of Medicine and Bachelor of Surgery (MBChB) in 1975. She went on to obtain a Master of Medicine in Pediatrics, with a bias in pediatric cardiology from the same university. Later she completed a post doctoral fellowship in pediatric cardiology from the University of Minnesota in the United States. In the 2000s – while she was the CEO at Karen Hospital – she undertook a Master of Business Administration (MBA) from Daystar University.

== Karen Hospital and the Heart Runs ==
Together with her husband, Betty Gìkonyo raised US$14 million to build the Karen Hospital. Of this, US$8 million came from Kenya Commercial Bank, a loan that the hospital has since repaid. The hospital was constructed between 2003 and March 2006. It had 450 employees as at 2015. The hospital also has satellite branches in Chester House (in Nairobi's city centre), Karatina, Meru, Nyeri, Nakuru, Kitengela and Mombasa. She plans to open a Betty Gìkonyo School of Nursing in Ngong.

As part of her charity work, Gìkonyo co-founded the Heart to Heart foundation, an organization that raises funds for poor children suffering from heart ailments. In 1993, she (together with her husband) pioneered the Heart Runs, annual charity events today known as the Karen Hospital Heart Run (or the Heart to Heart Foundation Run) and the Mater Heart Run. The Mater Heart Run attracted an estimated 60,000 participants in 2015.

== Personal life ==
She is married to Daniel Gìkonyo, a cardiologist, Karen Hospital co-founder and the long-standing personal doctor of Kenya's third president Mwai Kibaki.

They met at the University of Nairobi during her second year and were married in June 1974. She is a mother of three grownup children (a cardiologist, an epidemiologist and a poet).

== See also ==
- Juliet Gikonyo Nyaga

== Awards ==
- Silver Star (SS) Presidential Award in 1998
- Moran of the Burning Spear (MBS) Presidential Award in 2008
- CEO Global Limited East Africa Regional Awards: Most influential Woman (Medical category)

== Membership ==
- Kenya Medical Association
- Kenya Cardiac Society
- Kenya Pediatric Association
- Kenya Medical Women Association.
- Chairperson of Nairobi Health Management Board
- Chair of the University of Nairobi Alumni Association
