= Healthcare in Kenya =

Kenya's health care system is structured in a step-wise manner so that complicated cases are referred to a higher level. Gaps in the system are filled by private and church run units.

- Level 1 Community Health Units
- Level 2 Dispensaries and private clinics
- Level 3 Health centres
- Level 4 Sub-county hospitals and nursing homes
- Level 5 County Referral hospitals, Teaching and Referral hospitals and private hospitals
- Level 6 National referral hospital

== Health care units ==
=== Community Health Units ===
These are teams of trained volunteers that are recruited to offer the most basic primary healthcare and basic sanitation services to communities. Services include child medical care, vaccinations, first aid, and many more. Currently, there are a total of 11647 Community Health Units with 8941 fully functional, 1935 semi-functional, and 240 non-functional

=== Dispensaries ===
The government runs dispensaries across the country and are the lowest point of contact with the public. These are run and managed by enrolled and registered nurses who are supervised by the nursing officer at the respective health centre. They provide outpatient services for simple ailments such as common cold and flu, uncomplicated malaria and skin conditions. Those patients who cannot be managed by the nurse are referred to the health centres.

=== Private clinics ===
Most private clinics in the community are run by nurses. In 2011 there were 65,000 nurses on their council's register. A smaller number of private clinics, mostly in the urban areas, are run by clinical officers and doctors who numbered 8,600 and 7,100 respectively in 2011. These figures include those who have died or left the profession hence the actual number of workers is lower.

=== Health centres ===
All government health centres have a clinical officer as the in-charge and provide comprehensive primary care. Because of their heavy focus on preventive care such as childhood vaccination, rather than curative services, local council (municipal) and most mission, as well as many private health centres, do not have clinical officers but instead have a nurse as the in-charge.

Health centres are medium-sized units which cater for a population of about 80,000 people. A typical health centre is staffed by:

- At least one Clinical officer
- Nurses
- Health administration officer
- Medical technologist
- Pharmaceutical technologist
- Health records information officer
- Public health officer
- Nutritionist
- Driver
- Housekeeper
- Supporting staff

All the health centre staff report to the clinical officer in-charge except the public health officers and technicians who are deployed to a geographical area rather than to a health unit and report to the district public health officer even though they may have an office at the health centre.

The health centre has the following departments:

- Administration block where patients register and all correspondence and resources are managed.
- Out-patient consultation rooms where patients are seen and examined by clinical officers.
- In-patient (wards) where very sick patients can be admitted. The wards are divided into male, female and paediatric with newborn units.
- Laboratory where diagnostic tests are done. These laboratories can do the following tests: bloodslides for malaria parasites, sputum AFB, urinalysis, full haemogram, stool ova and cysts, blood sugar, Elisa and CD4 counts in comprehensive care centres for HIV/AIDS patients.
- Pharmacy
- Minor theatre where minor surgical procedures are done, e.g., circumcision, stitching wounds and manual vacuum aspiration
- Maternity
- Maternal and child health
- Kitchen and catering
- Student hostels for rural health training centres where students go to get rural experience.

=== Nursing Home ===
These are owned privately by individuals or churches and offer services roughly similar to those available at a sub-district or district hospital.

=== Sub-County hospitals ===
These are similar to health centres with addition of a surgery unit for Caeserian section and other procedures. Many are managed by clinical officers. A good number have a medical officer and a wider range of surgical services. Each sub-county, formerly district in the country, has a subcounty hospital, which is the co-ordinating and referral centre for the smaller units. They usually have the resources to provide comprehensive medical and surgical services. They are managed by medical superintendents.

=== County Referral hospitals ===
Kenya has 47 counties, each with at least one county referral, or teaching and referral hospital which is the referral point for the district hospitals. These are regional centres which provide specialised care including intensive care and life support and specialist consultations. It was the policy of many hospitals that those who do not pay their bills are not allowed to leave and may be prevented from doing so by armed guards. This policy was found to be illegal in September 2015 by the High Court but was still widespread in October 2018, when the court again ruled that this "is not one of the acceptable avenues (for hospitals) to recover debt".

=== National hospitals ===
There are five national hospitals in Kenya, namely:

- Moi Teaching and Referral Hospital
- National Spinal Injury Referral Hospital
- Kenyatta National Hospital
- Mathare National Teaching and Referral Hospital
- Kenyatta University Teaching and Referral Hospital

== Maternal and child healthcare ==
The 2010 maternal mortality rate per 100,000 births for Kenya is 530. This is compared with 413.4 in 2008 and 452.3 in 1990. The under-5 mortality rate, per 1,000 births is 86 and the neonatal mortality as a percentage of under-5's mortality is 33. In Kenya the number of midwives per 100,000 live births is unavailable and the lifetime risk of death for pregnant women is 1 in 380.

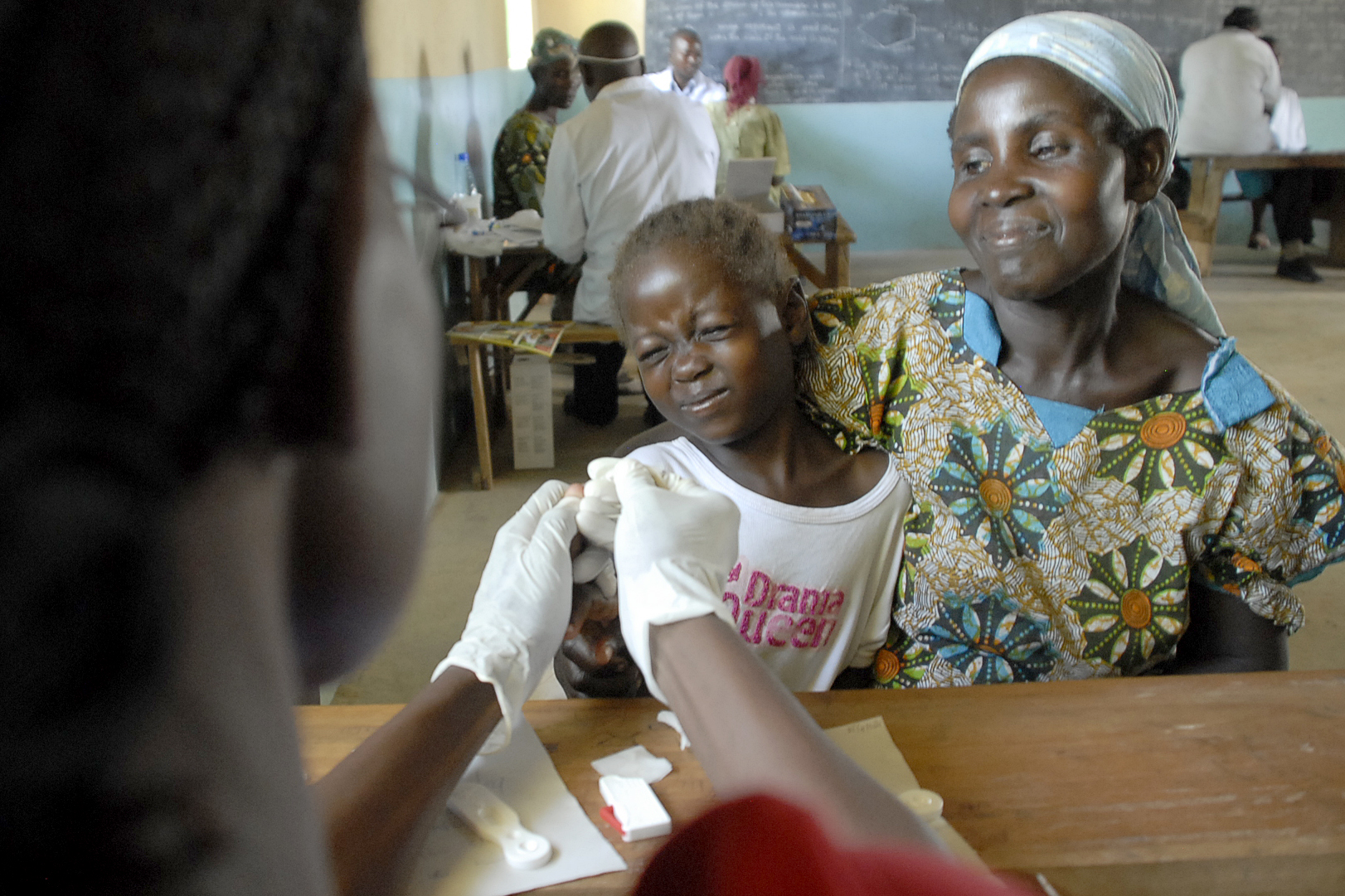
A girl with her mother receiving a malaria vaccine for children in a clinical trial in Kisumu, Kenya.

== Ministry of Health ==
The Ministry of Health has its headquarters at Afya house in Nairobi. There is one minister for health, although there used to be two between 2008 and 2013 when Kenya had a coalition government.

=== Director of medical services (DMS) ===
- County director of medical services(CDMS)
- County medical officer of health (CMOH)
- County health management board (CHMB)
- County health management team (CHMT)
- County hospital management board (C-HMB)

=== District medical officer of health (DMOH) ===
- District health management board (DHMB)
- District health management team (DHMT)
- District hospital management board (D-HMB)
- District hospital management team (D-HMT)

=== Health centre management committee (HCMC) ===
- Health centre management board (HCMB)
- Health centre management team (HCMT)

== Important institutions established by Acts of Parliament ==
- Medical practitioners and dentists board
- Clinical officers council, a statutory body in the Ministry of Medical Services legit as by CAP 260 of the laws of Kenya which oversees the training, registration and licensing of Clinical officers in Kenya.
- Kenya Medical laboratory Technicians and Technologist Board – Act of Parliament, JANUARY 2000
- Nursing Council of Kenya. The Nursing Council of Kenya is a body corporate established under the Nurses Act Cap 257 of the Laws of Kenya to regulate standards of nursing education and practice in Kenya. It protects the public by promoting standards of clinical care through training, licensure and enforcement of codes of regulation.
- Kenya Medical Supplies Agency a specialised medical logistics provider for Ministries of Medical Services/Public Health-supported health facilities and programmes.
- Pharmacy and Poisons Board. The Board is established as a body corporate, under the Pharmacy and Poisons Act, Cap 244 Laws of Kenya, regulatory body within the Ministry of Medical Services. It is a body corporate under Section 3(6).
- National Hospital Insurance Fund. Membership to the National Hospital Insurance Fund is compulsory to all salaried employee with voluntary membership to those in self-employment. Contributions range from KSh.160/= to a maximum KSh.320/=. However plans are underway to compute contributions as a percentage of ones salary. When members or their declared dependants fall ill and are admitted in accredited hospitals, they are only required to pay the balance of the bill after the rebate has been calculated. The rebate varies depending on the hospital status and ranges from KSh.400/= to KSh.2,000/= per day.
- Kenya Medical Research Institute. A state corporation that carries out medical research in Kenya. It collaborates with foreign research organisations such as CDC, The Wellcome Trust, Walter Reed Army Institute of Research etc.

== Online databases of healthcare providers ==
Online sources of healthcare provider data include:

- Ministry of Health: Kenya Master Health Facility List
- Kenya Medical Practitioners and Dentists Council: Registered practitioners
- Pharmacy and Poisons Board: Registered pharmacists and facilities
- Medpages: Healthcare providers by category and region. Search allows finding of providers by name or specialty.

== Private health management organisations ==
Private companies which offer additional health cover usually including outpatient cover which is not covered by the NHIF. They include:

- AAR Insurance
- Jubilee Insurance
- Alexander Forbes Healthcare
- Avenue Healthcare
- Britam Insurance
- UAP
- Resolution Insurance
- CIC
- First Assurance
- Heritage
- Trident

== Careers and training ==
- Medical officers and clinical officers
- Pharmacists and Pharmaceutical technologist
- Nurses are holders of a 2 1/2-year certificate (enrolled), 3 1/2-year diploma (registered) or 4-year bachelor's degree (BSN)
- Dentists and Dental technologists
- Medical technologists are trained by Technical University of Mombasa, Kenya medical training college, national polytechnics, universities or private colleges.
- Radiographers
- Nutritionists
- Public health officers and technicians degree (4 years), higher national diploma (1 year), diploma (3 years), and certificate (2 years)
- Health information officers
- Orthopedic technologists
- Medical engineers
- Hospital administrators
- Physiotherapists
- Optometrists
- perioperative Theatre Technologist/Surgical Technilogist-Diploma 2 1/2 years certificates 1 1/2 years
- Paramedics (4 years degree)

== Decentralization ==
Location Kenya AU Africa

In August 2010, Kenya conducted a national referendum that ushered in a new constitution. The new constitution introduced a new governance framework with a national government and 47 counties. This has been termed as decentralization or devolution. This was a marked shift from the highly centralized form of government that had been in place since independence in 1963. The centralized governance was plagued by political and economic dis-empowerment and unequal distribution of resources.

The term 'decentralization' is used to describe a wide variety of power transfer arrangements and accountability systems. Policies range from the transfer of limited powers to lower management levels within current health management structures and financing mechanisms to extensive sectoral reform efforts, which reconfigure the provision of even the most basic services. In the first case, decentralization may later become the driving force for health sector reform; in the latter, it is driven by the wider sectoral reform efforts. The parameters for decentralization -- the speed, the pressures, and the scope of issues to consider -- vary considerably.

In the Kenya context, the expectation is that a devolved health system will lead to improvement in efficiency of service delivery, stimulate innovation in the wider sector, improve access to and equity of available services, and promote accountability and transparency in service delivery.

== Context of healthcare in Kenya ==
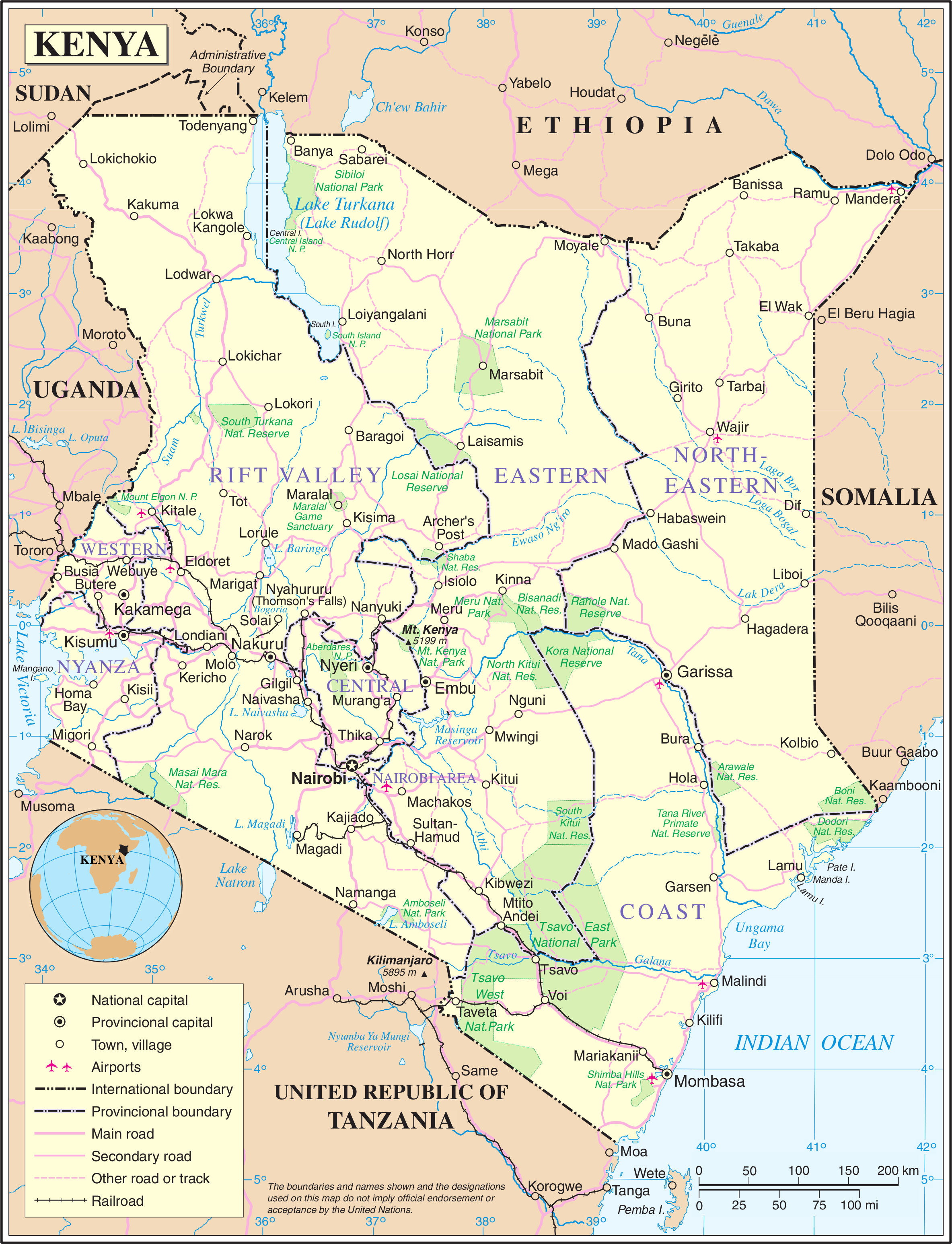
Map of Kenya.

A majority of Kenya's population receives healthcare services from the public sector. The range of services include preventive, promotive, curative and rehabilitative. Preventive services include routine childhood immunizations and environmental activities to control mosquito breeding which in turn reduce malaria transmission. Promotive services are mostly educational services provided to the general population on healthy lifestyles and available interventions. Curative and rehabilitative services include all treatment activities available at hospitals and other healthcare facilities.

To achieve these functions, the Kenya government has traditionally run a network of healthcare facilities staffed by government employees and run directly by the budgets allocated by the government from public resources. Under the centralized system, all healthcare facilities were organized into 6 levels. The levels of medical services in Kenya are assessed by the Ministry of Medical Services and the Ministry of Public Health and Sanitation. The same evaluation system is used for all public, private, mission, and NGO type health facilities.

Level	Type	Location	Examples	Total in 2021
6	Tertiary referral hospital, national hospitals	Capital City, Province	Kenyatta National Hospital	6
5	Secondary referral hospital, provincial hospital	Province	Embu Provincial General Hospital	68
4	Primary facilities, district hospitals and equivalent	District, County	Mombasa Hospital	110
3	Health Centre, Sub-District Hospital, Maternity Centre	City, County	Jacaranda Maternity Clinic	5
2	Dispensaries and clinics	Village Level	Isana Dispensary	
1	Community level	Community	Kosirai community unit	

== Strategy of decentralized healthcare ==
In the devolved government, the Kenya Health Policy 2014 – 2030 provides guidance to the health sector in terms of identifying and outlining the requisite activities in achieving the government's health goals. The policy is aligned to Constitution of Kenya and global health commitments.

Under the devolved system, healthcare facilities are organized as follows:

- Level 1: Community health services. This level comprises all community-based demand creation activities, that is, the identification of cases that need to be managed at higher levels of care, as defined by the health sector.
- Level 2: Primary care services. There are the dispensaries, health centers and maternity homes for both public and private providers.
- Level 3: County referral services: These are hospitals operating in and managed by a given county and consist of the former level four and district hospitals in the county and include public and private facilities.
- Level 4: National referral services: This level comprises facilities that provide highly specialized services and includes all tertiary referral facilities.

In essence, the decentralized system has consolidated service areas into 4 main categories for ease of governance and responsibility. These responsibilities are shared between the national government and county governments.

Devolution Kenya

== National level responsibilities ==
- Health policy
- Financing
- National referral hospitals
- Quality assurance and standards
- Health information, communication and technology
- National public health laboratories
- Public-private partnerships
- Monitoring and evaluation
- Planning and budgeting for national health services
- Services provided by Kenya Medical Supplies Agency (KEMSA), National Hospital Insurance Fund (NHIF), Kenya Medical Training College (KMTC) and Kenya Medical Research Institute (KEMRI)
- Ports, borders and trans-boundary areas
- Major disease control (malaria, TB, leprosy)

== County level responsibilities ==
- Ambulance services.
- Promotion of primary health care.
- Licensing and regulation of entities that sell food to the public.
- Disease surveillance and response.
- Veterinary services (excluding regulation of veterinary professionals).
- Cemeteries, funeral homes, crematoria, refuse dumps, solid waste disposal.
- Drug Rehabilitation services.
- Disaster management.
- Public health and sanitation.

Kenya Devolved Health. Source: Kenya Health Policy

== Governance ==
The Kenya Health Policy 2014 – 2030 also provides an institutional framework structure that specifies the new institutional and management arrangements required under the decentralized system. The policy acknowledges the need for new governance and management arrangements at both levels of government and outlines governance objectives.

Some of key objectives that are set for governance systems at the county levels include:

- The ability to delivery efficient, cost-effective and equitable health services to the population
- The further decentralization of health service delivery, administration and management to the community level
- Ability to initiate and sustain stakeholder participation and accountability in health service delivery, administration and management
- The ability to maintain operational autonomy
- The ability to maintain efficient and cost-effective monitoring, evaluation, reviewing and reporting systems
- The implementation of Smooth transition from current to proposed devolved arrangements
- The existence of complementarity of efforts and interventions between the national and county healthcare systems

== Financing ==
In Kenya, the primary sources of funding for healthcare are:

- The public. These are government allocations from the national budget comprising about 30% of the total yearly expenditure in healthcare in the country. This also the main source of funding for about 80% of the population that receives services from the public sector.
- Private (consumers). This is the largest contributor of total healthcare funds spent in the country at 35.9% of the total expenses. These funds serve about 20% of the population that is able to access private healthcare services. These are mostly funded through company or employee insurance schemes. These funds are thus not available for the newly decentralized units.
- Donors. These include funds to fight high burden diseases such as HIV, malaria and Tuberculosis. These funds directly supplement public sector funds and contributes about 30% of the total healthcare expenditure in the country.

The health service delivery function was formally transferred to counties on 9 August 2013, and one-third of the total devolved budget of KSh.210 billion/= (US$2 billion) was earmarked for health in the 2013/2014 budget following the transfer.

The budget for 2015/6 imposed severe restrictions. KSh.43 billion/= was allocated to the maternity budget, as in the previous year. Funding for the Kenyatta National Hospital was reduced from KSh.9.3 billion/= to KSh.8.8 billion/=. The Kenya Medical Research Institute was reduced to KSh.1.7 billion/= from KSh1.9 billion/= and the National Aids Control Council was cut to KSh.600 million/= from KSh.900 million/= and the slum health programme to KSh.700 million/= from KSh.1 billion/=.

The Social Health Insurance Fund rolled out on July 1, 2024, while the National Health Insurance Fund expired on June 30, 2024.

And The Kenya National Health Sector Strategic Plan of 2009–2017.

== See also ==
- List of counties of Kenya by life expectancy
- Health in Kenya
- HIV/AIDS in Kenya
- Kenya Medical Research Institute
