= Nanyuki Cottage Hospital =

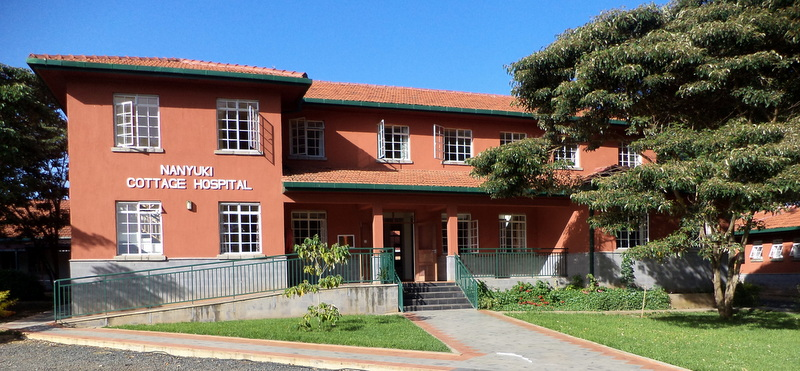
- The front side of the hospital

Geography
- Location: Kenya
- Coordinates: 0°00′11″N 37°04′43″E

Organisation
- Affiliated university: None
- Patron: None

Services
- Beds: 50 inpatient beds and includes an operating theatre, laboratory, X-ray department and pharmacy.

Helipads
- Helipad: No

Links
- Other links: List of hospitals in Kenya

Nanyuki Cottage Hospital is a nonprofit hospital in Nanyuki, Laikipia County, Kenya. The hospital has 50 inpatient beds and includes an operating theatre, laboratory, X-ray department and pharmacy.

The hospital also offers outpatient services such as antiretroviral therapy, family planning, HIV counselling and testing, and immunisation.

The hospital is a private charity and is managed by a committee of volunteers elected by members, who then elect the officers. It is supported by grants and donations, as well as fees paid by those patients who can afford it.

Every year the hospital is one of the beneficiaries for funds raised by the Lewa Marathon.
