= Juliet Nyaga =

Kenyan epidemiologist and corporate executive

- Born: September 1, 1976 (age 49); Kenya
- Citizenship: Kenya
- Education: University of Massachusetts Amherst (Bachelor of Science in Biology) (Bachelor of Science in Psychology); Tulane University (Master of Public Health in Epidemiology)
- Occupations: Epidemiologist; Medical Administrator; Businesswoman; Corporate Executive
- Years active: 2008–present

Juliet Gìkonyo Nyaga is a Kenyan epidemiologist, hospital administrator and corporate executive. Since 20 August 2020, she serves as the managing director and chief executive officer of the Karen Hospital in Nairobi. For one year before that she was the MD/CEO designate; before that she was the hospital's chief operations officer.

== Early life and education ==
She was born in September 1976, the middle child and only daughter of Dan Gikonyo, Chief of Cardiology and Betty Gikonyo, chairperson of the board at Karen Hospital. Nyaga's parent's founded the hospital in 2006.

After attending elementary and secondary school, she was admitted to the University of Massachusetts Amherst, graduating from there with a Bachelor of Science in Biology and a Bachelor of Science in psychology. Later, she graduated from Tulane University with a Master of Public Health with focus in Epidemiology.

== Career ==
Nyaga returned home to Kenya and began working at the hospital under her mother's supervision. In 2012 she was appointed as the chief operations officer of Karen Hospital. She spent the time being groomed to inherit her mother's position as CEO.

In August 2020, Nyaga was installed as the new CEO of Karen Hospital, replacing her mother, who after 15 years as CEO, became the chairperson of the hospital's board of directors.

In an interview that she gave in 2023, she indicated that she would not to try to "fill her mother's big shoes", but instead would create shoes that she could wear comfortably, while using her mother as an example and mentor. In another interview she highlighted the challenges of working with and playing the CEO role to both her parents.

== Personal life ==
Nyaga is married to Joe Nyaga since 2009 and together are the parents of two sons.
