= Peter Amollo Odhiambo =

Kenyan surgeon

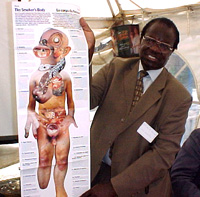
P. A. Odhiambo

Peter Amollo Odhiambo is a Kenyan consultant thoracic and cardiovascular surgeon. He is Kenya's first cardiothoracic surgeon and a professor of thoracic and cardiovascular surgery at the University of Nairobi. He is a founder and former chairman of the Kenya Cardiac Society, and a former president of the Pan African Society of Cardiology (PASCAR). Odhiambo is the chairman of the Kenya Tobacco Control Board. He is also the founder and editor of Medicom, the African Journal of Hospital Medicine.

== Biography ==
In 1986, Odhiambo was given an award for an outstanding contribution in medicine by the Giant Federation of Kenya, and in 1993 he received another award from PASCAR for his distinguished service to cardiology in Africa. He was the tenth dean of Nairobi University's Faculty, now School of Medicine, serving from 1992 to 1996. During his tenure, he successfully steered the faculty towards cost-sharing through its most difficult period for both staff and students. In 2012, he was given the Mater Hospital Recognition Award, followed, in 2013, by the SSK award for Outstanding Role in Medical Education and Teaching. He conceptualized and then chaired the University of Nairobi Teaching Hospital Project. He has written three books: Tobacco Versus Health, Making Sense of Cessation of Tobacco, and his autobiographical memoir, Making The Cut.

Odhiambo has campaigned widely against substance use and is at the forefront in the fight for the liberation of tobacco farmers in East Africa. He has steered the Kenya Tobacco Control Board to a successful level enabling the board be legally institutionalized. He has also played a key role in ensuring that the legal mandate of the board is within the laid down legal framework as per the Tobacco Control Act of 2007, thus the Board has all the necessary instruments to operate legally. In 2008, Odhiambo won a World No Tobacco Day Award from the World Health Organization for his accomplishments in the area of tobacco control. In 2016, the Tobacco Control Board of Kenya won a WHO World No Tobacco Day Award. He worked tirelessly behind the scenes to create awareness on the dangers of shisha (hookah), and was instrumental in the Kenya government's decision to ban shisha in the country.

He is involved in many community projects in his home village of Kanyaluo, found in Rachuonyo District in Western Kenya's Homa Bay County. He is a founder member and chairman of the Karachuonyo Development Society.

In 1998, Odhiambo's son, James Ocholla Odhiambo "Jordan", was gunned down by Kenyan policemen, for no cause, on his way home from the Nairobi Campus of the United States International University, where he was a student. The tragedy, which exposed corruption in the Kenya Police at that time, received wide media coverage and was a major source of motivation for Odhiambo's interest in, and consequent campaigns toward, the efficiency and effectiveness of the Kenya Police.

Odhiambo was educated at the Calcutta Medical College, Nairobi University, the University of Edinburgh, and McGill University. He resides in Nairobi with his family.

== See also ==
- Luo people of Kenya and Tanzania
