= Kenya Cardiac Society =

Kenyan non-profit organization

The Kenya Cardiac Society (KCS) is a non-governmental, non-profit organization found in Kenya with the aim to promote cardiac health and cardiac-related activities.

== History ==
Founded by the late Prof. Hillary Ojiambo and Prof. Peter Odhiambo, and eight members of the 1980 Kenyatta National Hospital Cardiac team, the society has since grown and is now a member of the World Heart Federation with more than 60 members.

KCS is best known for its collaborative program with Mater Hospital and the Heart Walk held every September.

The late professor of medicine and head of cardiology department at the University of Nairobi, contributed to establishing the clinical science labs at Kenyatta National Hospital for the School of Medicine. In April 1997, the man who kept a rosary, Bible, and dummy heart on his desk passed away. His wife, Dr. Julia Ojiambo, and their children Josephine, Jack, "Tess," and Sanda survived him.
