= Kisii Teaching and Referral Hospital =

Hospital in Kisii County, Kenya

Geography
- Location: Kisii, Kisii County, former Nyanza Province, Kenya
- Coordinates: 0°40′14″S 34°46′17″E

Organisation
- Type: General

Services
- Standards: Ministry of Health Level 5
- Beds: 650

History
- Founded: 1916

Links
- Lists: Hospitals in Kenya

The Kisii Teaching and Referral Hospital is a public hospital in Kisii, Kisii County, Kenya. It is the largest hospital in Kisii County and is accredited at Level 5 by the Kenyan Ministry of Health.

== History ==
The hospital was started during World War I to care for wounded. It served as a district hospital for many years. The hospital is partnered with the Kisii University School of Medicine.

== Facilities ==
The hospital provides full inpatient services with 650 beds, including oncology, renal analysis, palliative care, and CT/MRI scanning services.
