= Moi Teaching and Referral Hospital =

Coordinates: 0.511803°N 35.280407°E

Geography
- Location: Nandi Road, Eldoret, Uasin Gishu County, Kenya

Organisation
- Care system: Public
- Affiliated university: Moi University

Services
- Emergency department: Yes
- Beds: 1000

Helipads
- Helipad: No

History
- Opened: 1916

Links
- Website: www.mtrh.go.ke
- Lists: Hospitals in Kenya

Moi Teaching and Referral Hospital is the second National Referral Hospital in Kenya. The Hospital is located along Nandi Road in Eldoret, Uasin Gishu County.

Moi Teaching and Referral Hospital was founded in 1917 and operated as a district hospital before attaining referral status in 1988.

The hospital governs the Shoe4Africa Children's Hospital, a 200-bed fully serviced paediatric teaching hospital that is built within its grounds and is the only public children's hospital in East Africa. The Shoe4Africa Children's Hospital was opened in 2015, and in 2022, celebrated treating its millionth patient.

== See also ==
- Healthcare in Kenya
