= Julius Migos Ogamba =

Kenyan lawyer and politician

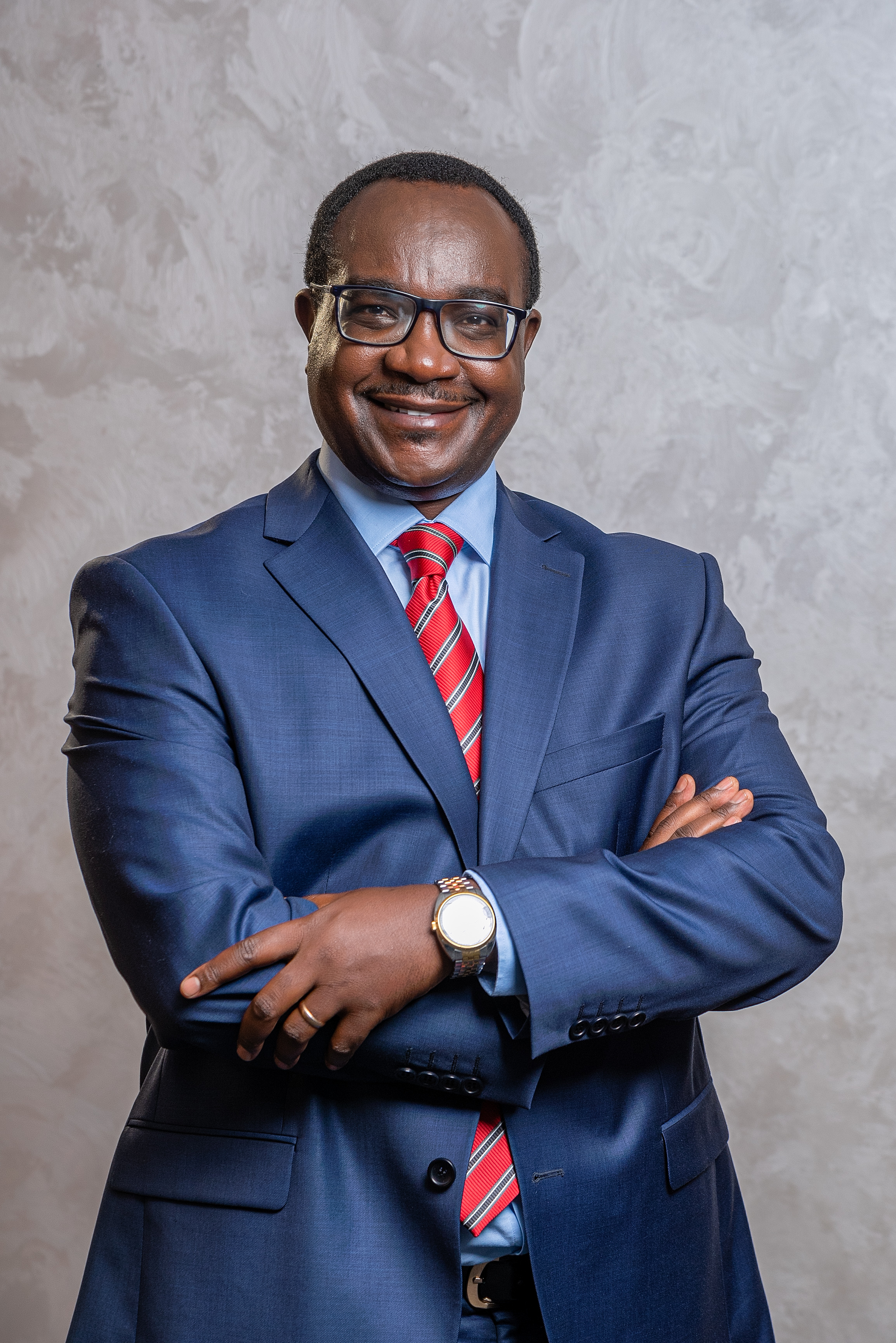

Cabinet Secretary - Ministry of Education
- Incumbent
- Assumed office 8 August 2024
- President: William Ruto
- Preceded by: Ezekiel Machogu

Chairman - Board of Kenya Electricity Generating Company
- In office March 1, 2023 – August 2024

Personal details
- Born: 1967 (age 58–59) Kitutu Chache North Constituency; Kisii County, Kenya
- Education: University of Nairobi; Kenya School of Law; Institute of Advanced Legal Studies

Julius Migos Ogamba born (1967) is the Cabinet Secretary for Education in Kenya. He assumed office on 8 August 2024 after appointment by President William Ruto.

== Education ==
Julius holds a Bachelor of laws (LL.B) from the University of Nairobi, Diploma in Law from Institute of Advanced Legal Studies, University of London and a Post Graduate Diploma in Law from Kenya School of Law.

== Career ==
Ogamba is an advocate of the High Court of Kenya, Commissioner for Oaths and Notary Public and a Senior Partner at Migos-Ogamba and Waudo Advocate firm.

Prior to his appointment as a Cabinet Secretary, Ogamba served as the Chairperson of the Board of Directors of Kenya Electricity Generating Company PLC (KenGen).

=== Politics ===
Ogamba ran for the Kitutu Chache North parliamentary seat in 2017 under an Orange Democratic Movement (ODM) ticket but lost to Jimmy Angwenyi. In the 2022 general election, he served as the running mate of the former Education Cabinet Secretary Ezekiel Machogu where they run for the Kisii Gubernatorial seat on a United Democratic Alliance (UDA) ticket but lost to Simba Arati.
