= Mombasa Hospital =

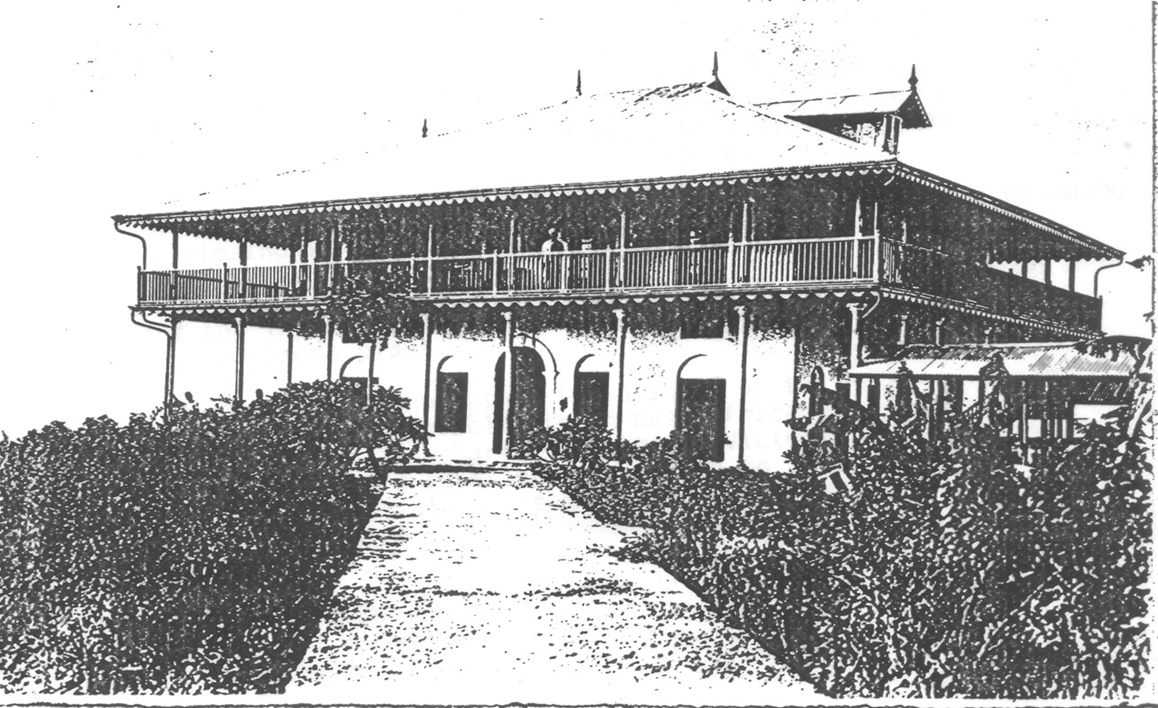
- English Hospital in 1891

Geography
- Location: Kizingo, Mombasa, Coast Province, Kenya
- Coordinates: 4°03′55″S 39°40′51″E

Organisation
- Type: General

Services
- Standards: Level 4 Hospital
- Beds: 125

History
- Former name: English Hospital
- Opened: 1891

Links
- Website: www.mombasahospital.com
- Lists: Hospitals in Kenya

The Mombasa Hospital, established by the British in 1891 as the English Hospital, is the oldest and largest private hospital in Coast Province of Kenya. It is located in the Kinzingo area of Mombasa and is accredited by the Kenyan Ministry of Health as a Level 4 hospital.

== History ==
The original English hospital was established with a substantial donation from the British East Africa Company in 1891. The Holy Ghost Fathers of the Roman Catholic Church were chosen to run the hospital. The hospital became part of the East African Protectorate in 1895, when the East African Protectorate took over the British East Africa Company. The hospital continued to serve only European patients. In 1898, the British opened the Native Civil Hospital in Makadara for non-European Patients. Electric power was instituted in the hospital in 1910. In 1921, the hospital changed its name to the European hospital. The first ambulance was used in 1940, serving both the European hospital and the Native Civil Hospital. In 1944, the government decided to dedicate the hospital to the African community and let European and Asian patients go elsewhere. The Mombasa and Coast European Hospital Association was formed in 1947 and took over responsibility of the hospital. The building of a new 70-bed hospital began in 1948 and was completed in 1950. The Mombasa and Coast European Hospital Association changed its name in 1951 to the Mombasa Hospital Association, which continued to the present day. The hospital was renamed the Katherine Bibby Hospital in 1962 in honor of a hospital matron. The hospital's name was changed in 1980 to the Mombasa Hospital.

== Facilities ==
The Mombasa Hospital has 125 beds and is accredited by the Kenyan Ministry of Health as a Level 4 hospital. The hospital includes a pediatric ward, Intensive Care Unit, High Dependency Unit, maternity ward, and general ward segregated into male and female beds for medical and surgical services. The hospital includes a pharmacy, operating theaters, gastroenterology and endoscopy equipment, radiology and imaging services, physiotherapy, renal dialysis, chemotherapy, obstetrics and gynaecology, outpatient, emergency room services.

== See also ==
- Other hospitals in Coast Province
