= Mathari Hospital =

Mathari National Teaching and Referral Hospital

Geography
- Location: Mathare district, Nairobi., Kenya
- Coordinates: 1.259229°S 36.845459°E

Organisation
- Type: Specialist

Services
- Beds: 700
- Speciality: Psychiatry

History
- Opened: 1901

Links
- Website: matharihospital.go.ke
- Lists: Hospitals in Kenya

Mathari National Teaching and Referral Hospital is the only public (government institution) psychiatric hospital in Kenya. It has capacity for 700 patients and is located near the slum area of Mathare district of Nairobi.

== History ==
Mathari Hospital was founded in 1910 by the colonial authorities of British Kenya. A smallpox isolation centre was redesigned and became the Nairobi Lunatic Asylum. The facilities were segregated with African patients, who constituted 95% of the patients, being kept in the worst conditions. They lived in very overcrowded bomas, which were the traditional form of housing in Kenya. The facilities provided for Asians were somewhat better with the best conditions being reserved for Europeans. Up until independence all psychiatrists, senior doctors and nurses employed at the hospital were European. Mathari hospital is a specialized National Referral, Training and Research Public Institution in mental health in Kenya. It's located along west of Nairobi along Nairobi-Thika Road. Mathari hospital, which has a bed capacity of 700 (a third of which are reserved for females), is Kenya's premier psychiatric hospital, and is the national psychiatric teaching and referral hospital. The institution admits patients with severe psychiatric disorders who cannot afford private services and are considered too disturbed to be managed in other public facilities or in the community. Its catchment area is largely the Nairobi urban area where the facility is located, together with the close rural and urban environs to the city.

== See also ==
- J. C. Carothers
