= Wamba Hospital =

Hospital in Wamba, Samburu County, Kenya

Coordinates: 0°58′40″N 37°19′06″E

Wamba Hospital, also known as Catholic Hospital Womba, is a hospital in Wamba, Samburu County, Kenya. It was established in the 1969 by Padre Della Consolata with the support of the consolata sisters.

This foundation has helped build a school building for the children who are taken care of at the hospital.
