= Wamba, Kenya =

Wamba
- Location within Kenya
- Coordinates: 0°59′0″N 37°19′0″E
- Country: Kenya
- Province: Samburu County

Wamba is a small town in Samburu County in central Kenya. It is located south-southwest edge of the Mathews Range, and northwest of the Samburu National Reserve. The northbound Isiolo - Moyale road (A2 road) is about 40 kilometres drives east of Wamba.

Wamba town is the headquarters of the Wamba administrative division, which is divided into five locations, Wamba being one of them. The location has a population of 4,051 (1999 census).

Wamba forms an electoral ward of the Samburu East Constituency and Samburu County Council.

The town was featured in Episode 9 of Survivor: Africa.

== Health care ==
Wamba Hospital is located in Wamba.
