= National Security Council (Kenya) =

The National Security Council (NSC) of Kenya is the highest constitutional state organ responsible for national security, policy integration, and crisis management. Based at State House in Nairobi, it is chaired by William Ruto as President of Kenya. Prior to 2010, national security decisions were primarily managed by the National Security Advisory Committee (NSAC) of the eGovernment of Kenya. Following the introduction of the 2010 Constitution of Kenya, the NSC was formally institutionalized to ensure civilian oversight, parliamentary accountability, and structured decision-making in matters of state defense. The operations, meetings, and statutory duties of the council are fully regulated by the National Security Council Act of 2012. The NSC must also submit an annual report to the Parliament of Kenya detailing the security state of the country.

== Composition ==
| Photo | Name | Title |
|---|---|---|
| | William Ruto | President of Kenya (Chairman) |
| | Kithure Kindiki | Deputy President of Kenya (Vice-Chairman) |
| | Joseph Boinnet | National Security Advisor (Secretary) |
| | Soipan Tuya | Cabinet Secretary for Defence |
| | Musalia Mudavadi | Cabinet Secretary for Foreign and Diaspora Affairs |
| | | Cabinet Secretary - Ministry of Interior |
| | Dorcas Oduor | Attorney General of Kenya |
| | Charles Muriu Kahariri | Chief of Defence Forces |
| | Noordin Mohamed Haji | Director-General of the National Intelligence Service |
| | Douglas Kanja Kirocho | Inspector-general of police |

== NSAs ==
- Monica Juma (27 October 2022 – 14 April 2026)
- Joseph Boinnet (since 14 April 2026)

== See also ==
- Kenya Defence Forces
- National Intelligence Service (Kenya)
- Government of Kenya
