= Amina Mohamed =

Kenyan politician (born 1961)

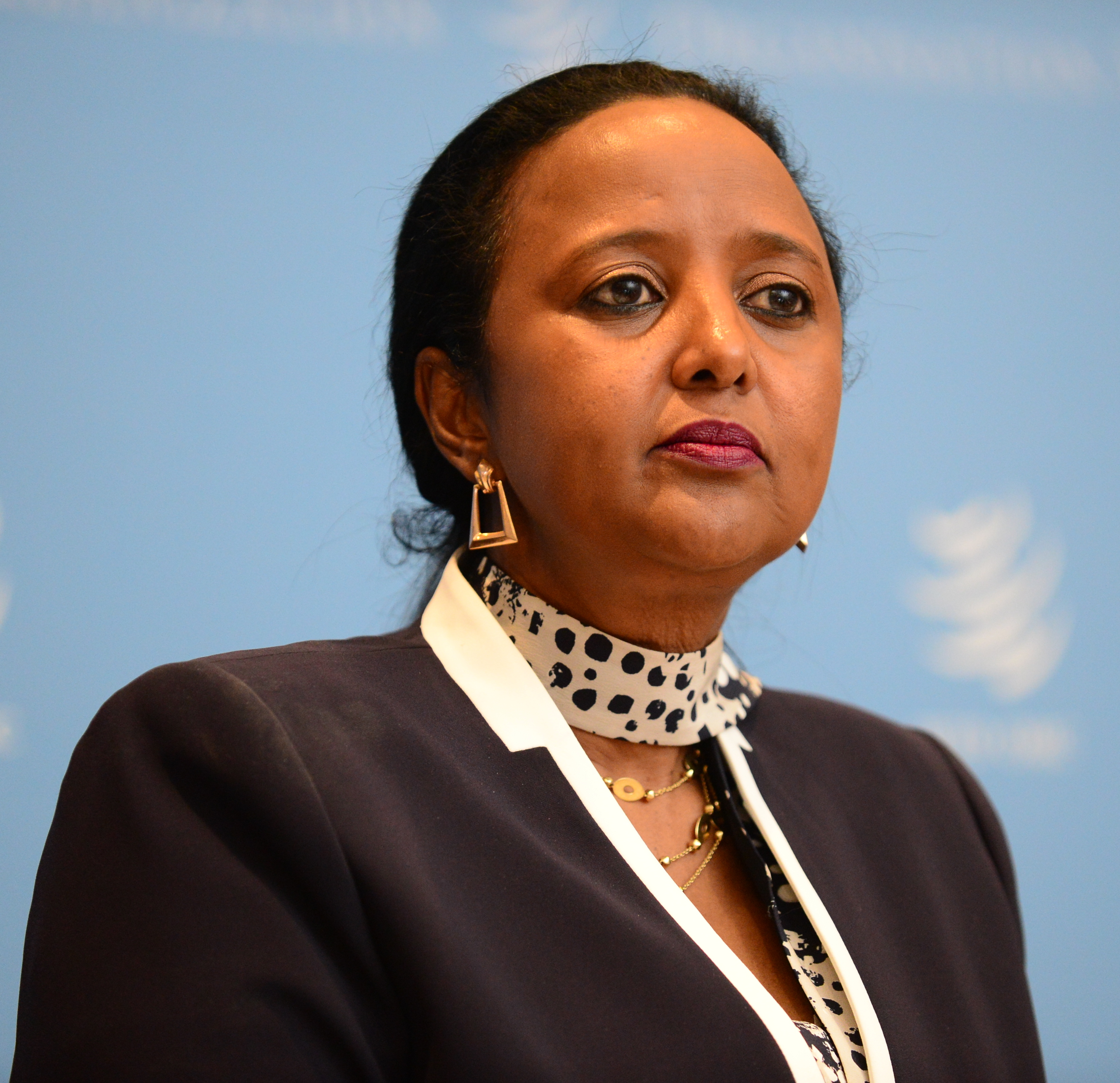

Cabinet Secretary for Sports, Culture and Heritage 2 March 2019-27 October 2022
- In office 2 March 2019 – 27 October 2022
- President: Uhuru Kenyatta
- Preceded by: Rashid Echesa
- Succeeded by: Ababu Namwamba

Cabinet Secretary for Education 5 February 2018- 2 March 2019
- In office 5 February 2018 – 2 March 2019
- Appointed by: Uhuru Kenyatta
- Preceded by: Fred Matiang'i
- Succeeded by: George Magoha

Cabinet Secretary for Foreign Affairs 20 May 2013-5 February 2018
- In office 20 May 2013 – 5 February 2018
- Appointed by: Uhuru Kenyatta
- Preceded by: Sam Ongeri
- Succeeded by: Monica Juma

Deputy Executive Director of the United Nations Environment Programme
- In office 13 May 2011 – 20 May 2013
- Appointed by: Ban Ki-moon
- Preceded by: Angela Cropper

Personal details
- Born: 5 October 1961 (age 65) Kakamega, Kenya
- Party: Jubilee Party
- Spouse: Khalid Ahmed
- Children: 7
- Education: Kenya School of Law (LLB); University of Kyiv (LLM); University of Oxford (PGDip)

Amina Chawahir Mohamed Jibril (Somali: Aamina Maxamed Jibriil; Arabic: أمينة محمد جبريل, born 5 October 1961) is a former Kenyan cabinet secretary, lawyer and a diplomat of Somali descent. She is the immediate former Cabinet Secretary for Sports, Heritage and Culture in Kenya. She previously served as chairwoman of the International Organization for Migration and the World Trade Organization's General Council, as well as Assistant Secretary-General and Deputy Executive Director of the United Nations Environment Programme. She served as the Cabinet Secretary for Foreign Affairs of Kenya from May 2013 to February 2018, when President Uhuru Kenyatta, after re-election, moved her to the Education docket. In March 2019, she was moved to the Sports Ministry replacing Rashid Echesa. The KNEC Director, George Magoha, replaced her in the Education docket.

== Early life and education ==
Mohamed was born on 5 October 1961 in Kakamega County, Kenya, to an ethnic Somali family. She is the eighth of nine siblings. Her family belongs to the Dhulbahante clan, and hails from the Sool region in Somalia. Mohamed spent her childhood in a modest household in Amalemba, Kakamega, where she passed much of her time reading Sherlock Holmes stories and other detective fiction. She later developed a taste for international affairs.

For her elementary studies, Mohamed attended the Township Primary School in Kakamega and later Butere Girls and Highlands Academy. Her mother believed strongly in the importance of education, and would frequently drop by her classes to monitor her performance. Upon graduation, Mohamed moved to Ukraine on a scholarship to study at the University of Kyiv. She completed the institution's courses, earning a Master of Laws (LLM) in international law. Mohamed later obtained a Postgraduate Diploma (PGDip) in international relations from the University of Oxford. Through a Fellowship at the United Nations Institute for Training and Research (UNITAR), she also followed several training courses on international law.

In 2002, Mohamed married her late husband Khalid Ahmed Hossain, a Bengali businessman to whom she credited much of her success. She has a son from her marriage to Mr Hossain, two step-children from Hossain's previous marriage, and cares for four orphans.

Mohamed is multilingual, speaking her native Somali as well as English, Russian and Swahili, with a working knowledge of French.

== Career ==
=== Legal advisor roles ===
Mohamed began her career in 1985 as a legal officer at the Kenyan Ministry of Local Government. Her duties included assessing World Bank projects and tabling municipal by-laws. Between 1986 and 1990, Mohamed served as a Legal Advisor in Kenya's Ministry of Foreign Affairs, where she drafted and negotiated various bilateral and international treaties. Among these were Bilateral Air Services Agreements with the United Arab Emirates, Oman, Iran and the United Kingdom, as well as the African Convention on the Rights of the Child. Although a number of job opportunities overseas were available, Mohamed chose to remain with her parents as her father was ailing.

From 1990 to 1993, Mohamed served as a Legal Advisor to Kenya's mission at the UN head office in Geneva, Switzerland. There, she worked alongside officials from the International Labour Organization, World Health Organization and General Agreement on Tariffs and Trade/World Trade Organization. She took a brief sabbatical to pursue higher studies in the UK, before returning to diplomatic service in Geneva. In 1997, Mohamed began serving as Legal Advisor to the Kenyan delegation at the UN Security Council.

=== Roles in Kenya and with the UN ===
Between 2000 and 2006, Mohamed worked as the Ambassador and Permanent Representative for the Kenya diplomatic mission in Geneva. She was also the chairperson, coordinator and spokesperson for the African Group in the WTO's Human Rights Commission. In 2002, Mohamed served as president of the Conference on Disarmament and was appointed the first female chairperson of the International Organization for Migration. At the time, Kenya was the only African country included in the organization. When approached for the chairmanship, Mohamed agreed to accept the candidacy only if the organization opened up to more African countries.

She chaired the Trade Policy Review Body in 2003, and served as the chairman of the Dispute Settlement Body in 2004. In 2005, Mohamed became the first woman to chair the WTO's General Council. She was also a Member of the Executive Boards and Committees of the WIPO, ILO, WHO, UNCTAD, UNHCR and UNAIDS from 2001 to 2005. Between 2006 and 2007, Mohamed served as Director for both Europe and Commonwealth Countries as well as Diaspora matters for Kenya. She also chaired the Department of Foreign Trade and Economic Affairs' Committee on Strengthening and Restructuring.

=== Secretary of the Ministry of Justice and the UN ===
She was the Permanent Secretary in the Ministry of Justice, National Cohesion and Constitutional Affairs of Kenya from 2008 to 2011. In that role, in 2010 she supervised the redrafting of the Constitution of Kenya. During the 2010–2011 calendar year, Mohamed served as the president of the United Nations Conference on Transnational Crime in Vienna. In July 2011, Mohamed was named Assistant Secretary-General and Deputy Executive Director of the United Nations Environment Programme (UNEP).

=== Cabinet Secretary for Foreign Affairs ===
On 23 April 2013, Mohamed was appointed Kenya's Cabinet Secretary for Foreign Affairs, one of 18 Cabinet Secretary nominees to the new Uhuru Kenyatta administration. She was later sworn into office on 20 May 2013 at Sagana State Lodge.

According to the Business Daily Africa publication, "Kenya's vigorous lobbying and aggressive Pan-Africanism agenda gained momentum with the collapse of International and Criminal Court (ICC) cases against Mr Kenyatta and Mr Ruto partly because attributed to Ms Mohamed's skillful diplomatic maneuvers." The same publication reported that Mohamed by late 2016 had "come under heavy criticism for remaining tight-lipped over the suffering of Kenyan detainees in Ethiopia." Also, in December 2016 she stated that Kenya supported "Saharawi Arab Democratic Republic's quest for self-rule and its membership of the African Union," which proved controversial with Morocco and other Arab states. She is currently the chairwoman of the World Trade Organization (WTO) Ministerial Conference.

=== African Union Commission Chair Campaign ===
In 2017, Mohamed was nominated by President Uhuru Kenyatta to serve as chair of the African Union Commission (AUC). Despite lobbying for the role from the Kenyan government, Mohamed lost the position to Moussa Faki, the foreign affairs minister of Chad. Uganda afterwards denied reports in February that it had failed to support Mohamed in her bid for AUC chair, stating that "Uganda wishes to state categorically that our support to the candidature of Amina before and during elections was unequivocal... Uganda wishes to reassure the government and the people of Kenya, and Amina in particular, that we remain a reliable ally and partner given our warm and close relations and our commitment to the EAC integration". The Daily Nation stated that Burundi and Djibouti were also suspected of withdrawing support, with Tanzania denying it had done so.

=== Other activities ===
In late April 2017, she had a series of meetings with US officials such as Senator Bob Corker, Tom Shannon, and Constance Hamilton, where she urged the US to continue to interact with Kenya for the benefit of both nations. On 9 May 2017, she was honored by the Japanese government at the Imperial Palace for "promoting economic relations between Nairobi and Tokyo". She was the only African personally invested at the event with the award, the Grand Cordon of the Order of the Rising Sun. At the time, CNBC wrote that Mohamed was "known as an excellent strategist with proven negotiation and managerial skills". On 20 May 2017, it was reported that Mohamed had met with Russian foreign minister Sergei Lavrov in Beijing, afterwards stating that she felt the meetings signaled possible renewed engagements between Kenya and Russia.

=== Cabinet Secretary for Education ===
On 26 January 2018, President Kenyatta appointed Amina Mohammed to be the Education Cabinet Secretary for his second term. She pledged to continue with the reforms initiated by her predecessor Dr. Fred Matiang'i. Her Principal Secretary Ambassador Monica Juma was promoted to head the Foreign Affairs docket.

At the Education Ministry, Amina Mohammed was lauded for the administration of the 2018 national examinations. She also achieved a 93% transition of pupils finishing primary school to join high school – the highest in Kenyan history at the time. She also devised and implemented a Special Needs Education policy and restructured the Higher Education Loans Board, which provides student loans in Kenya. Her reforms in the Vocational Training Centres increased enrollment in vocational training by 100%. She also completed and piloted the Competency-Based Curriculum. However, her decision to delay the implementation of the Curriculum in 2019 proved controversial and she reversed herself on it after a dress-down from President Uhuru Kenyatta. Her decision to lower the entry grade to teacher training colleges to a D was also overturned by the Kenyan High Court. These decisions are thought to have contributed to her being moved to the Sports, Heritage and Culture Ministry in March 2019.

=== Cabinet Secretary for Sports, Heritage and Culture ===
In March 2019, President Kenyatta appointed Amina Mohamed to be the Cabinet Secretary for Sports, Heritage and Culture, replacing the fired Rashid Echesa. She has called for more resource allocation to the Sports Ministry.

=== Nomination for Director-General of the WTO ===
On 7 July 2020, Mohamed was nominated by Kenya for the position of WTO Director-General. She proceeded to the second round of the selection process, and was long seen as a frontrunner in diplomatic circles. By October 2020, the WTO's General Council selected two finalists – Ngozi Okonjo-Iweala and Yoo Myung-hee – thereby eliminating Mohamed and two other candidates.

She sits on the Advisory Council of the Africa Prosperity Network, an organisation dedicated to mobilising Africa's private sector to own and drive with greater urgency the continent's economic integration agenda and in collaboration with political and institutional leadership.

== Other activities ==
- International Olympic Committee (IOC), Member of the Ethics Commission

== Honors ==
Honors received by Mohamed include:

- Elder of the Order of the Golden Heart of Kenya (EGH)
- Chief of the Order of the Burning Spear (CBS)
- Knight of the Order of the Star of Italian Solidarity (Cav.O.S.S.I.)
- Life Member of the Red Cross Society
- Member of the Life and Peace Institute International Advisory Council
- Honorary Doctorate from KCA University
- Member of the World Economic Forum's Global Agenda Council on the Arctic
- Grand Cordon of the Order of the Rising Sun (2017)
- Member of the Strathmore Law School Advisory Board

== Personal life ==
In 2002, Amina Mohamed married Khalid Ahmed Hossain, a successful businessman of Bengali descent (Kolkata, West Bengal). Her beloved husband passed away on 29 July 2021. Mr Hossain is survived by his wife Amina Mohamed, their shared son, two adult children from a previous marriage and the couple's four adopted children.

== See also ==
- List of foreign ministers in 2017
- List of current foreign ministers
- Foreign relations of Kenya

Political offices
Preceded by Sam Ongeri	Minister for Foreign Affairs; 2013–2018	Succeeded by Monica Juma
