= Kenya–United Kingdom relations =

Bilateral relations

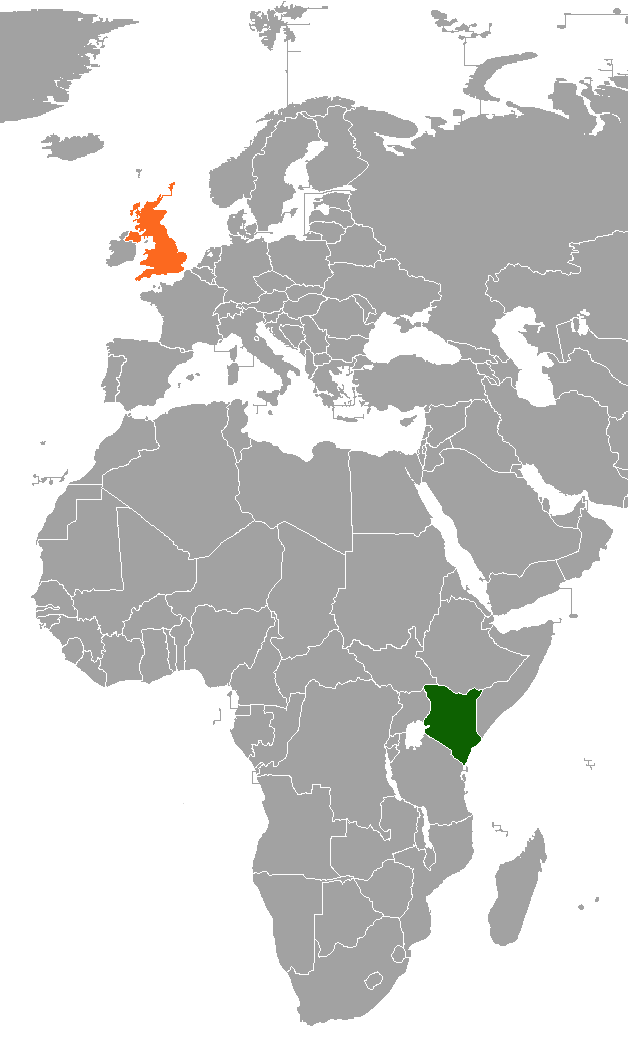

- Kenya: United Kingdom

Diplomatic mission
- High Commission of Kenya, London: High Commission of the United Kingdom, Nairobi

Envoy
- High Commissioner Manoah Esipisu: High Commissioner Jane Marriott

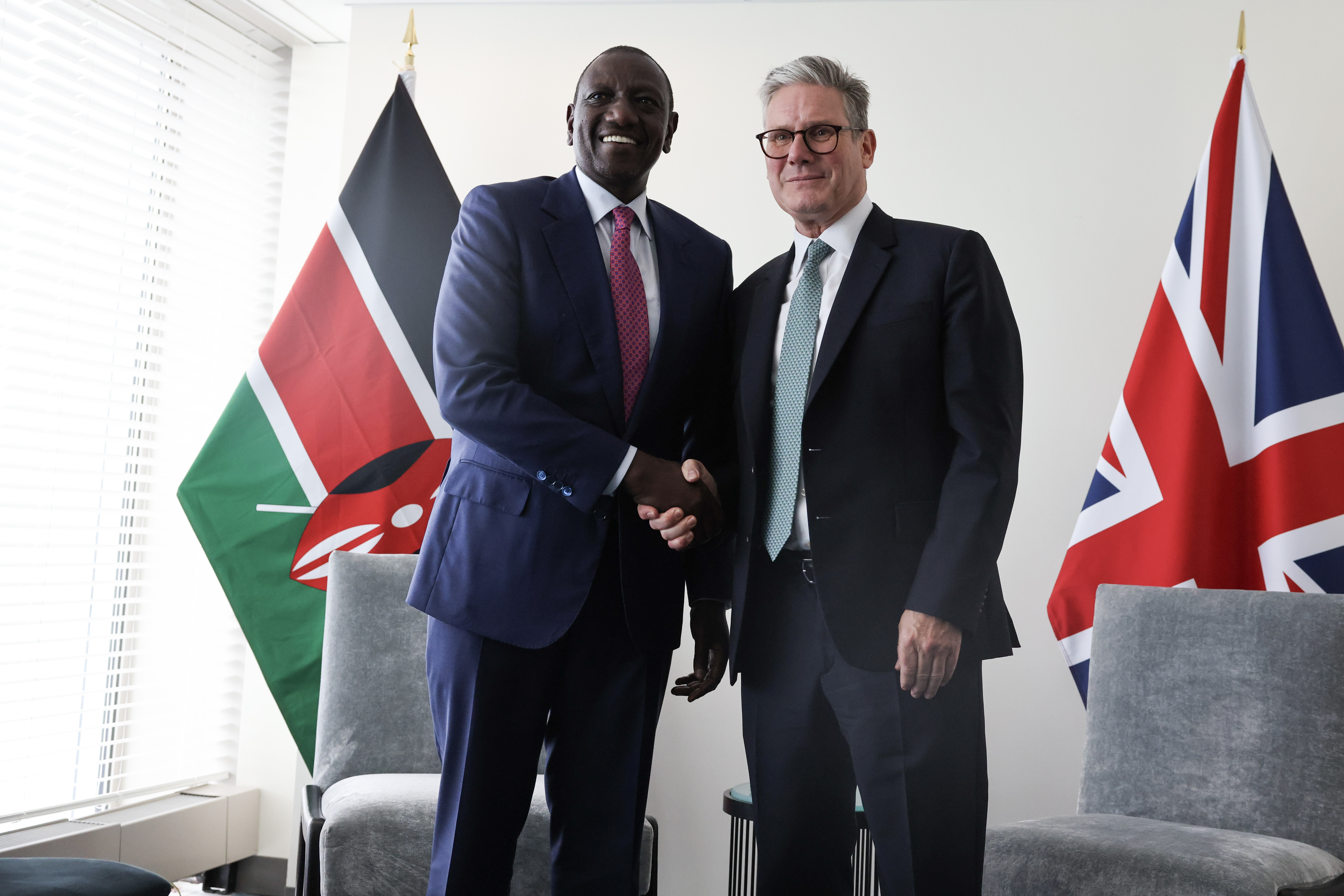
Kenyan President William Ruto with British Prime Minister Keir Starmer at a United Nations General Assembly in New York City, September 2024.

The Republic of Kenya and the United Kingdom maintain the international and bilateral relations. The UK governed Kenya from 1895 to 1963, when it achieved full independence. Following its independence, Kenya and the United Kingdom established diplomatic relations in 1963.

Both countries share common membership of the Commonwealth, the World Health Organization, and the World Trade Organization. Bilaterally the two countries have an Economic Partnership Agreement, a Defence Cooperation Agreement, a Development Partnership, a Double Taxation Agreement, and an Investment Agreement.

== Historical relations ==
=== British Empire ===
Kenya and the UK have historical relations dating back to the 19th century. Between 1824 and 1826 the Kenyan port city of Mombasa was under British occupation. In 1887 a 16-kilometre-wide strip in the Kenyan coast was leased by the British. In 1895, Kenya became part of the East Africa Protectorate. Kenya, as a member of the British Empire, contributed troops during World War I and World War II. In 1920, the region became the Colony and Protectorate of Kenya. Kenya achieved independence from the UK in 1963 and was thus a colony of the UK between 1895 and 1963 (68 years).

Between 1963 and 1964, the country retained Elizabeth II as the head of state and Queen of Kenya. The Queen was represented in Kenya by a governor-general, who was Malcolm MacDonald. The prime minister of Kenya was Jomo Kenyatta. In 1964, Kenya became a republic with the president of Kenya as head of state.

Elizabeth II visited Kenya four times, in 1952, 1972, 1983 and 1991.

=== Post independence ===
Following the violent struggle for independence, Kenya and the UK maintained warm relations. At one point, the UK was considered Kenya's most significant ally in the West. The UK provided economic and military assistance to Kenya.

In the early 1960s, the administration of Kenyan President Jomo Kenyatta reached a strong agreement with the administration British Prime Minister Alec Douglas-Home for military cooperation. This began decades of goodwill, mutual respect and cooperation between the countries. Douglas-Home's successor as prime minister, Harold Wilson, visited Kenya in 1966. Wilson confirmed that all of the agreements made between President Kenyatta's government and the administration of Prime Minister Douglas-Home would be honored by Wilson's administration. The point of the meeting was mainly to sort out what to do about an exodus of Kenyan Asians leaving Kenya and moving to Britain.

In the 1980s, British Prime Minister Margaret Thatcher visited Kenya, and was received in an elaborate state banquet by Kenyan President Daniel Arap Moi. Prime Minister Thatcher said "Mr. President, we admire what we see: your country's peace and stability; policies which recognise the worth of individual effort and personal endeavour subodied in the concept of “harambee” —self-help; an economy in which private ownership and private industry have been encouraged; above all, a country which has enjoyed strong and decisive leadership within a constitutional framework." This remark was met by applause by those in attendance. At the same conference Prime Minister Thatcher and President Moi discussed ways of combatting the apartheid policies of South Africa. Thatcher wanted to end apartheid through diplomatic pressure, while Moi supported sanctions. However, John Major worked in Thatcher's cabinet as Chief Secretary to the Treasury, foreign secretary and chancellor of the exchequer, and he also believed the best way to combat apartheid was with targeted sanctions. Major took over as prime minister in November 1990. This put the government's in London and Nairobi more on the same page. Kenyan President Daniel Arap Moi was invited to London by Prime Minister John Major in 1994, and he accepted the invitation.

Upon the election of Uhuru Kenyatta as President of Kenya, the UK sought to distance itself diplomatically from Kenya, as Kenyatta had been indicted by the International Criminal Court (ICC) for crimes during the post election violence of 2007. Upon the election of Uhuru Kenyatta as president, the High Commissioner of the UK, Christian Turner, stated that the UK would only deal with Kenya on essential business.

In 2014, Kenyatta's case in the ICC was dropped.

British Chancellor Gordon Brown was an outspoken proponent of increasing aid and cooperating with Kenya in 2005. He then became prime minister two years later in 2007. Brown expressed support for Kenya during the post-election violence of early 2008. Following this, David Cameron became prime minister in 2010. He too proved to be a strong ally for Kenya.

== Military relations ==
The British Army trains troops in Kenya, in preparation for operations in countries such as Afghanistan. The Unit is known as the British Army Training Unit Kenya (BATUK). It is a permanent training unit with stations in Kahawa, Nairobi (which is a smaller unit) and Nanyuki. BATUK provides logistical support to visiting units of the British Army. It consists of 56 permanent staff and a reinforcement of 110 personnel. The UK trains the newly created Kenyan Marines. As of May 2023, the UK and Kenya agreed to cooperate militarily even further than the two countries had done previously, in a deal that will see the UK contribute 1.7 billion Kenyan shillings a year towards enhancing Kenya's defense.

=== Boris Johnson ===
In 2021 British Prime Minister Boris Johnson and Kenyan President Uhuru Kenyatta signed a five-year defense cooperation agreement between the United Kingdom and Kenya, Defence Secretary Ben Wallace and Kenyan Cabinet Secretary for Defence Monica Juma signed the accord which built on existing agreements and which provides a basis for the exchange of military personnel for defense activity, allowing for enhanced training opportunities and increasing collaboration in peace support work. Kenyan Cabinet Secretary for Defence, Dr Monica Juma said "Today, the Right Honorable Ben Wallace and I reaffirmed our commitment to continue deepening the defence cooperation between our two nations. The framework underpinning this strategic relationship is the Defence Cooperation Agreement which has become an invaluable tool for enhancing the competencies of our defence forces. Overall, our cooperation continues to significantly improve the ability of our forces to operate effectively in high-threat environments."

The signing of the DCA came six months after the two defense secretaries met in Nairobi, agreeing a refreshed security compact to deepen cooperation in tackling Al-Shabaab and other shared threats such as cybercrime and human trafficking.

== Political relations ==
In 2013 after Kenya's new President Uhuru Kenyatta was sworn into office, Prime Minister David Cameron was one of the first foreign leaders to congratulate him on his election victory. Kenyan President Uhuru Kenyatta was invited to the United Kingdom in 2013 by Prime Minister Cameron, despite pressure from various international organizations not to invite him. Prime Minister Cameron worked out a deal with Kenya's President Uhuru Kenyatta for military cooperation in 2015. Cameron also argued in favor of Kenya's point of view that western countries should not put "travel warnings" out about visiting Kenya as this hurts the Kenyan economy and therefore undermines Kenya's fight against terrorism.

David Cameron's successor, Prime Minister Theresa May, visited Kenya in 2018. She sought to improve cooperation between the two countries on subjects such as trade, fighting crime and the war on terrorism. Prime Minister May said she wanted “a partnership for opportunity [and] for our shared security.” When asked if Brexit would disrupt working with the United Kingdom, President Uhuru Kenyatta rejected this and said “I don't see Brexit as meaning anything detrimental towards the strong trade ties we already have.” President Uhuru Kenyatta was invited to visit the United Kingdom again by Theresa May's successor Boris Johnson. The two leaders signed a strong trade deal which ensured that British trade with Kenya would continue uninterrupted after Brexit. In early 2020, President Uhuru Kenyatta visited the United Kingdom and was received at 10 Downing Street by Prime Minister Boris Johnson.

On 28 July 2021, Prime Minister Boris Johnson welcomed President Uhuru Kenyatte to Chequers where it was announced that the United Kingdom would send 817,000 COVID-19 vaccines to Kenya. On the same visit the two leaders planted a tree to mark the Kenya-UK Year of Climate Action. Speaking before their bilateral talks, President Uhuru Kenyatta said “This visit has presented a unique opportunity to reaffirm our commitments to the long-standing bilateral relations between Kenya and the UK, that are founded on shared values and similar aspirations of enhanced cooperation for sustained socio-economic prosperity for our two peoples.”

Manoah Esipisu, the Kenyan High Commissioner to the UK, said "Discussions today are an important step in reviewing progress after the President's last visit 18 months ago and how we can move together in combating challenges exacerbated by COVID-19. Our main principle is mutual respect, mutual prosperity. Win-win." The following day, Prime Minister Boris Johnson and President Uhuru Kenyatta co-hosted the Global Education Summit in London, President Kenyatta said: “Even before the pandemic, we were facing a global education crisis. Now, exacerbated by Covid-19 and its knock-on effects on learning, we are in a make-or-break situation, where progress previously made is at risk of becoming undone...We know that girls have been disproportionately affected. It has compounded the barriers to an education they already faced: child marriage, gender-based violence, female genital mutilation and teenage pregnancies. We risk a lost generation of girls.” Prime Minister Johnson agreed and added that “Educating the world's children, and girls in particular, is the single greatest investment we can make for the prosperity of our societies. I am determined that young people will be at the vanguard of the global effort to build back better from the pandemic. Our role as world leaders is to give them the life chances they need.”

Neil Wigan, a seasoned British diplomat, served as the United Kingdom's High Commissioner to Kenya from August 2023 until mid-2025. During his tenure, he advanced the implementation of the UK–Kenya Strategic Partnership, which was subsequently renewed in July 2025 as the Strategic Partnership 2025–2030, committing both nations to deepen collaboration in trade, investment, climate action, green growth, technology, and security. Wigan's departure in 2025 occurred against the backdrop of sensitive challenges, including ongoing investigations into the conduct of British soldiers in Kenya, such as the high-profile case of Agnes Wanjiru, whose 2012 death linked to UK military personnel remains under judicial review. In the interim, senior officials at the British High Commission in Nairobi are expected to manage affairs until a new High Commissioner is appointed.

=== Look East policy ===
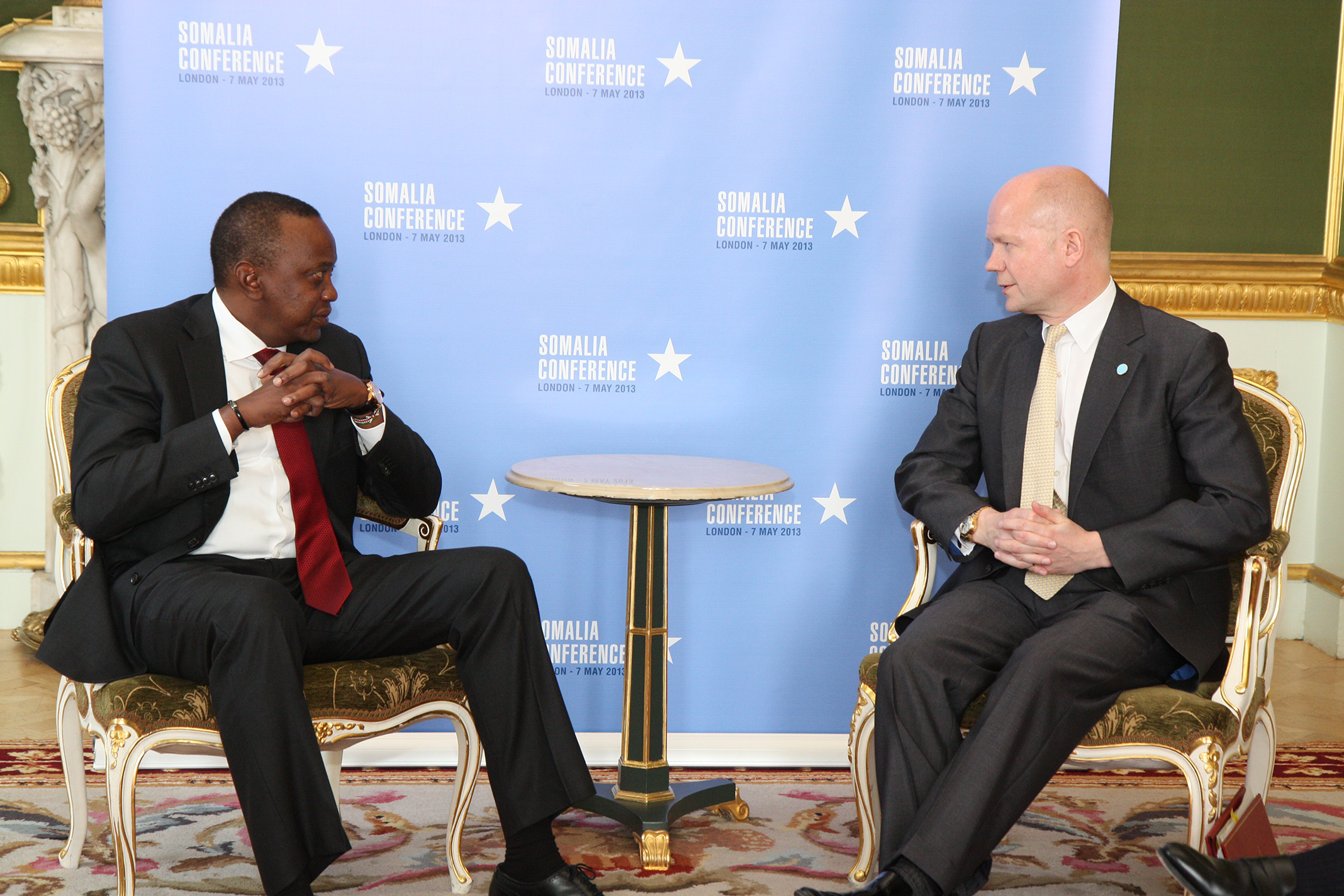
President Uhuru Kenyatta with British Foreign Secretary William Hague at an international conference in London (May 2013)

The Kenyan government had adopted a Look East policy and since China was key to the policy, the Kenyan government turned to China for infrastructural funds.

Kenya's relations with the UK were debated in Britain's parliament. British Members of Parliament (MPs) were particularly concerned with the growing influence of China in Kenya as Britain had sought to isolate Kenya diplomatically after Kenyatta's election. The MPs noted with concern that China's efforts in Kenya to develop infrastructure were successful and that Britain had not been supporting Kenya in the same way.

== Cultural relations ==
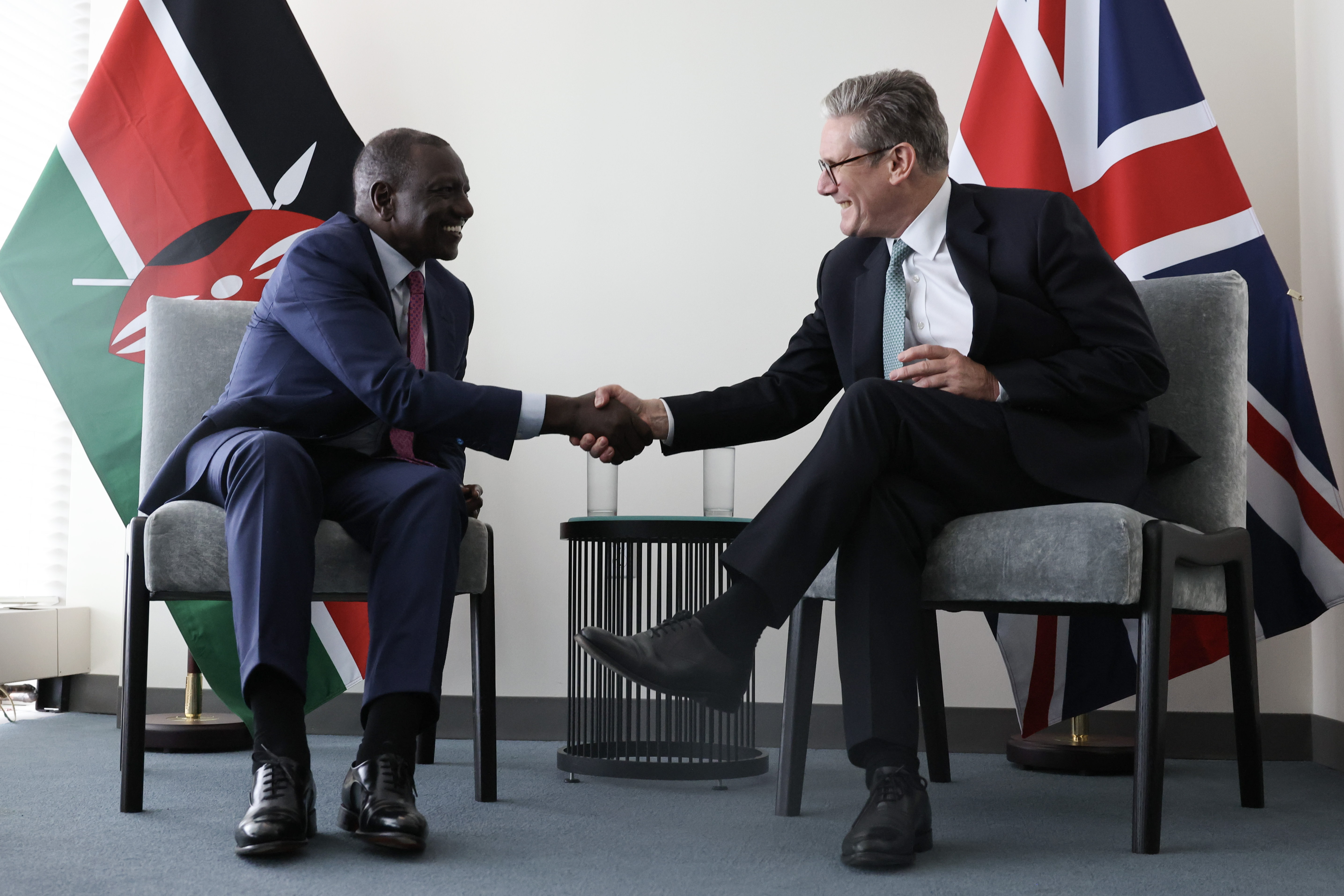
British Keir Starmer with Kenyan President William Ruto at the United Nations General Assembly (2024)

Kenya has a large English speaking population; one of Kenya's official languages is English. Kenya drives on the left, a practice retained from its time as a British colony. There are 25,000 British citizens who live permanently in Kenya. More than 200,000 Britons visit Kenya yearly. Kenya is also a member of the Commonwealth of Nations.

The interactions between the two countries have been positive and friendly since Kenya's independence in 1963. Both the UK and Kenya are members of the Commonwealth of Nations and engage with each other regularly on matters of military, economic and cultural importance. Kenya retains many aspects of British culture and governance, such as continuing to use English within administration, education and the law, driving on the left, hosting a diaspora community of Britons, and having a large Protestant population. The British military continues to play an important role in the country with Kenya hosting the UK's largest base in Africa, which provides vital anti-terrorism training to the Kenyan police. The British royal family, in particular Elizabeth II had very close personal ties to the country. Elizabeth II was in Kenya when she received news that her father King George VI had died, and had made multiple state visits throughout her reign. To mark the 2022 Platinum Jubilee, Prince Edward visited the country to reinforce ties and celebrate Kenya's historic and current relationship with the UK. British tourism and finance are significant contributors to the Kenyan economy, with 100,000 British people visiting the country ever year for its national parks and wildlife.

== Economic relations ==
Bilateral trade between both countries exceeds KES.139 billion (£1 billion).

The UK is also one of the largest investors in Kenya, Vodafone plc owns stake in Kenya's largest taxpaying firm, Safaricom. The UK is also a major buyer of Kenyan horticultural produce. The UK imports 8.5% of Kenyan goods and 3.4% of British goods make up Kenya's imports. China was Kenya's largest source of FDI, during the early 2010s, however China has been overtaken by the United Kingdom and the UK is now the largest source of FDI.

The UK aims to double trade within the coming years. Although Kenya's exports lack diversification, trade between both countries is never heavily in favour of the other.

=== Trade agreements ===
From 16 October 2014 until 30 December 2020, trade between Kenya and the UK was governed by the East African Community–European Union Economic Partnership Agreement, while the United Kingdom was a member. Following the withdrawal of the United Kingdom from the European Union, the UK and Kenya signed a continuity trade agreement on 8 December 2020, based on the EU free trade agreement; the agreement entered into force on 1 January 2021. Trade value between Kenya and the United Kingdom was worth £1,364 million in 2022.

In April 2025, the United Kingdom's Tullow Oil PLC agreed to sell its Kenyan assets to Gulf Energy Ltd for at least $120 million as part of a strategy to reduce its debt burden. The deal included three scheduled payments of $40 million, additional royalty entitlements, and a 30% free-carried interest in any future development phases. The agreement followed Tullow's consolidation of ownership in May 2023, when it became the sole stakeholder in the Lokichar oilfields after TotalEnergies and Africa Oil Corp withdrew. Despite this, full production had not commenced, largely due to infrastructure limitations, including the need for a heated pipeline to the coast.

On July 2, 2025, the UK and Kenya officially launched a renewed Strategic Partnership for 2025–2030. This bilateral framework aims to intensify cooperation in trade, investment, climate action, green growth, technology, and security.

== Resident diplomatic missions ==
- Kenya has a high commission in London.
- United Kingdom has a high commission in Nairobi.

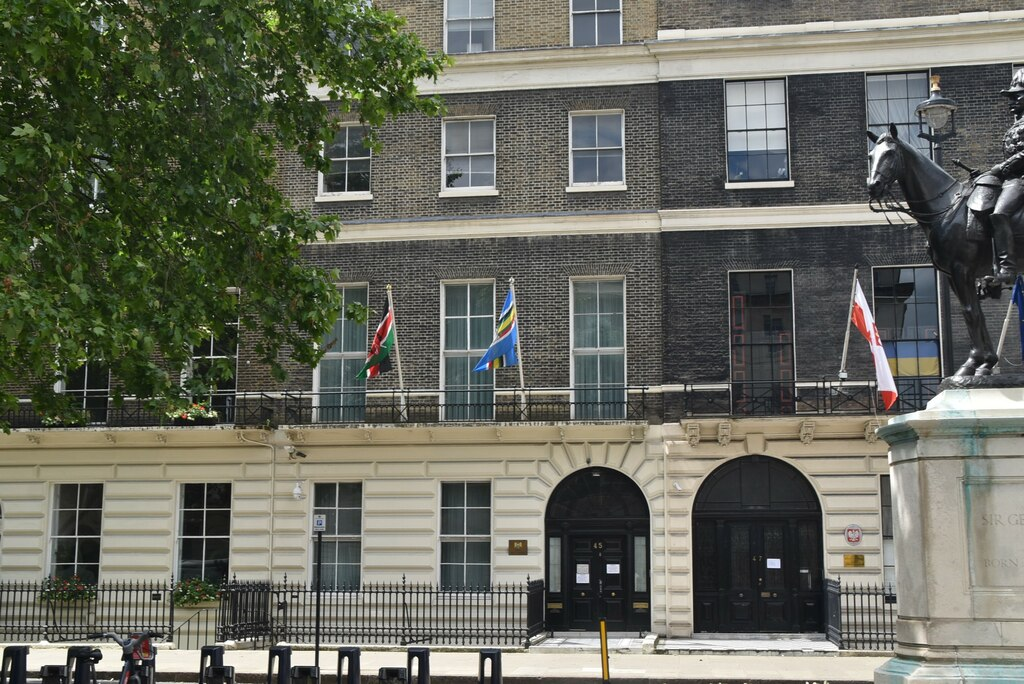
Kenyan high commission in London

== Controversy ==
=== Justice and Military Concerns ===
The British Army Training Unit Kenya (BATUK), which operates under a bilateral defence agreement, has faced criticism following a series of high-profile sexual violence cases. In June 2025, a British soldier was arrested in Kenya after allegations of rape surfaced. The investigation, led by the United Kingdom's Defence Serious Crime Command, renewing long-standing concerns about accountability and transparency in how crimes involving foreign soldiers on Kenyan soil are handled.

The arrest followed renewed attention to the unresolved case of Agnes Wanjiru, a Kenyan woman who disappeared in Nanyuki in 2012 and was later found dead. Witnesses reported that she had last been seen in the company of British soldiers. For years, the case attracted controversy amid accusations of negligence and cover-up. In April 2025, UK Defence Secretary John Healey met Wanjiru's family in Kenya and publicly pledged cooperation with local investigators. The case file was subsequently handed to senior prosecutors in Nairobi for possible criminal proceedings.

Tensions escalated further in August 2025, when Kenya's Parliamentary Defence, Intelligence and Foreign Relations Committee accused BATUK officials of being "hostile witnesses" after they failed to appear before the committee during its inquiry into the Wanjiru case. The committee warned that such non-compliance could lead to punitive measures, including fines, arrest warrants, or continuation of investigations without BATUK's input.

=== Military fire ===
In August 2025 the British government agreed to compensate thousand Kenyan people, following their claims they were affected by fire caused from a British military training exercise that took place four years earlier. According to the lawyers in the trail, the UK will pay around £2.9 million.

== See also ==
- Kenyan migration to the United Kingdom
- British soldiers and allegations of sexual exploitation in Kenya
