= Monica Juma =

Kenyan diplomat (born 1963)

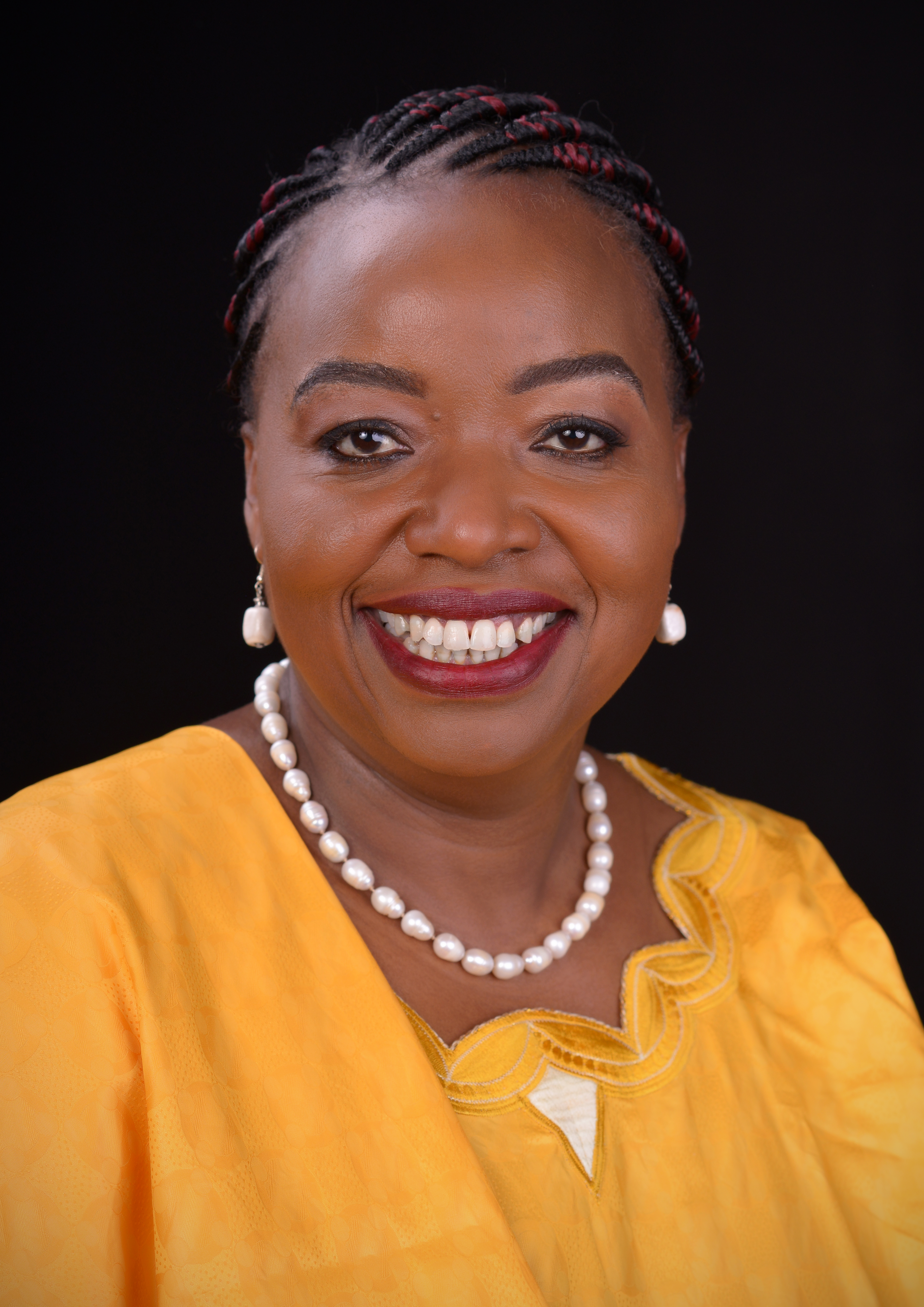
- Juma in 2020

Executive Director of the United Nations Office on Drugs and Crime
- Incumbent
- Assumed office 11 May 2026
- Preceded by: Ghada Waly

National Security Advisor
- In office 27 October 2022 – 14 April 2026
- Appointed by: William Ruto
- Succeeded by: Joseph Boinnet

Cabinet Secretary for Energy and Petroleum
- In office 30 September 2021 – 27 October 2022
- President: Uhuru Kenyatta
- Preceded by: Charles Keter
- Succeeded by: Davis Chirchir

Cabinet Secretary for Defence
- In office 14 January 2020 – 30 September 2021
- Appointed by: Uhuru Kenyatta
- Preceded by: Raychelle Omamo
- Succeeded by: Eugene Wamalwa

Cabinet Secretary for Foreign Affairs
- In office 5 February 2018 – 14 January 2020
- Appointed by: Uhuru Kenyatta
- Preceded by: Amina Mohamed
- Succeeded by: Raychelle Omamo

Principal Secretary for Foreign Affairs
- In office 12 January 2016 – 5 February 2018
- Appointed by: Uhuru Kenyatta
- Preceded by: Perminus Karanja Kibicho
- Succeeded by: Macharia Kamau

Principal Secretary for Interior
- In office 15 August 2014 – 11 January 2016
- Appointed by: Uhuru Kenyatta
- Preceded by: Mutea Iringo
- Succeeded by: Perminus Karanja Kibicho

Principal Secretary for Defence
- In office 15 July 2013 – 14 August 2014
- Appointed by: Uhuru Kenyatta
- Preceded by: Nancy Chepkemoi Kirui (nee Cheluget)
- Succeeded by: Mutea Iringo

Personal details
- Born: 26 September 1963 (age 62) Kitui District, Southern Province, Kenya Colony
- Citizenship: Kenya
- Children: 2
- Education: University of Nairobi (BA, MA); University of Oxford (DPhil)

Monica Kathina Juma CBS, EGH, MBS (born 26 September 1963) is a Kenyan diplomat who currently serves as Executive Director at the UNODC and director general of the United Nations Office at Vienna. She has previously served as National Security Advisor to President William Ruto. She previously served as the Cabinet Secretary for Defence in the cabinet of President Uhuru Kenyatta.

== Early life and education ==
Juma studied at the University of Nairobi for her Bachelors of Arts in Government and Public Administration and Masters of Arts in Government and Public Administration and University of Oxford, Certificate in Refugee Studies and where she also attained her Doctorate of Philosophy in Politics.

== Diplomatic career ==
Juma has a long career in the diplomatic service, having served as Kenya's concurrent ambassador to Ethiopia, Djibouti, the African Union, the Inter-Governmental Authority on Development and the United Nations Economic Commission for Africa, based out of Addis Ababa. On 27 June 2013, she was sworn in as the Principal Secretary, in the Kenya Ministry of Defence, serving in that capacity until she was moved to the Kenya Ministry of the Interior, as Principal Secretary.

== Political career ==
Juma served as the Cabinet Secretary in the Ministry of Foreign Affairs between January 2016 and February 2018.

She served as the Principal Secretary in the State Department of Interior, Ministry of Interior and Coordination of National Government.

Prior to serving in the Ministry of Interior, Juma served as the Cabinet Secretary in the Ministry of Defence.

On 23 May 2024, Juma was among the guests invited to the state dinner hosted by U.S. President Joe Biden in honor of President William Ruto at the White House.

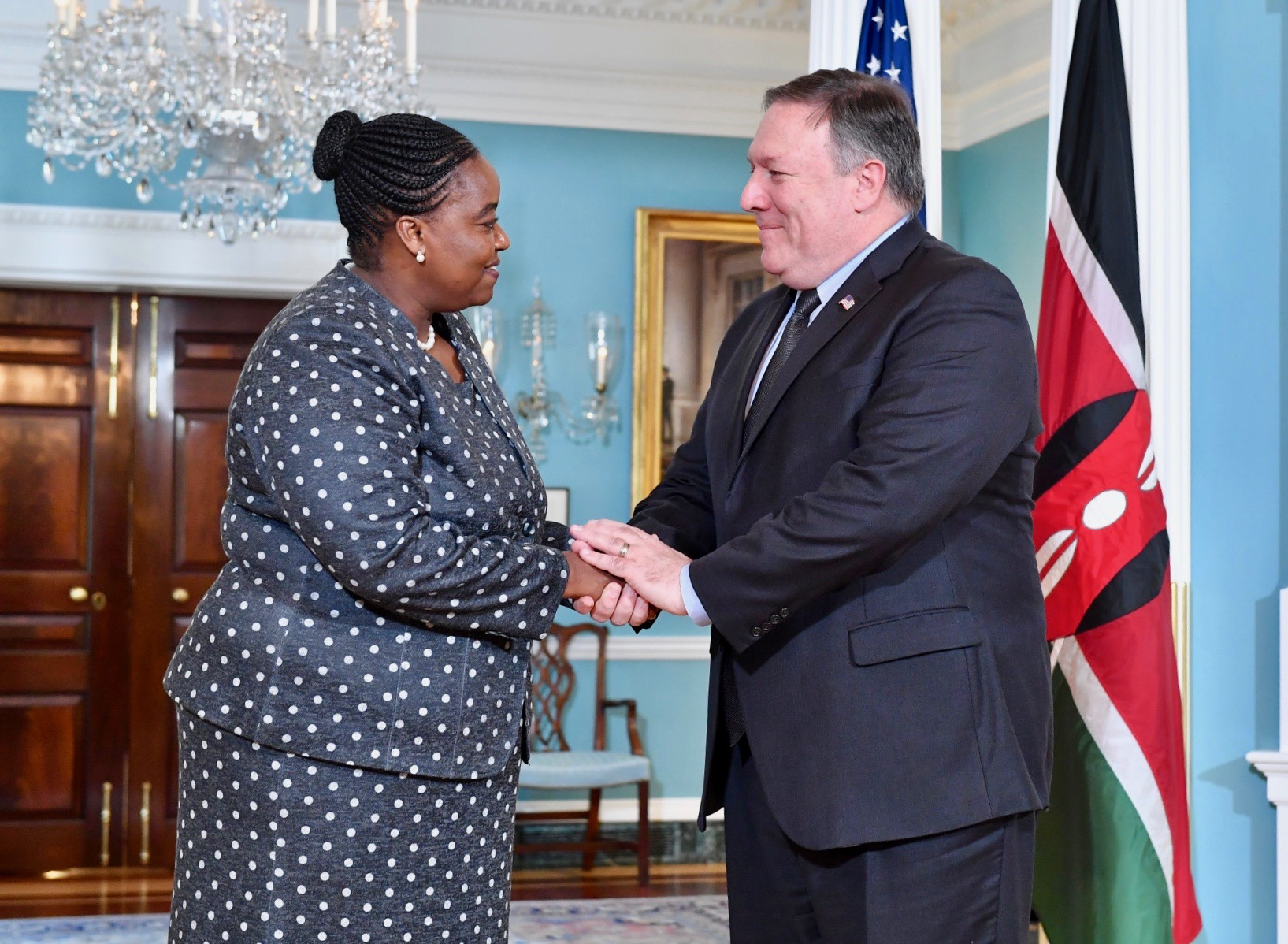
Juma and Mike Pompeo in Washington, D.C., 2018

== Other activities ==
Juma is a senior research fellow in the Department of Political Science, at the University of Pretoria in South Africa. She is also an adjunct faculty member at the African Centre for Strategic Studies of the National Defense University, in Washington, D.C. in the United States of America. She has written and published extensively on the subjects of her specialization.

== See also ==
- Amina Mohamed
- Raychelle Omamo
- Judy Wakhungu

Positions in intergovernmental organisations
Preceded by (Egypt) Ghada Waly	Executive Director of the United Nations Office on Drugs and Crime; 2026–present	Incumbent

Political offices
Preceded by Amina Mohamed	Cabinet Secretary for Foreign Affairs; 2018–2020	Succeeded by Raychelle Omamo
Preceded by Raychelle Omamo	Cabinet Secretary for Defence; 2020–2021	Succeeded by Eugene Wamalwa
