= Kimaiyo =

Kimaiyo is a surname of Kenyan origin meaning "boy born in the presence of alcohol Maiyo" (from Kip- + Maiyo) . It may refer to:

- Daniel Kimaiyo (born 1948), Kenyan hurdler and two-time African champion
- David Kimaiyo (born 1960), Kenyan policeman and Inspector General of the Kenya Police
- Eric Kimaiyo (born 1969), Kenyan marathon runner
- Fatwell Kimaiyo (born 1947), Kenyan 110 metres hurdler and two-time All-Africa Games champion
- Hellen Kimaiyo (born 1968), Kenyan long-distance runner and two-time African champion

== See also ==
- Maiyo, origin of the name Kimaiyo
