= Joseph Boinnet =

Kenyan police officer

Joseph Boinnet MGH

National Security Advisor
- Incumbent
- Assumed office 14 April 2026
- Preceded by: Monica Juma

Deputy National Security Advisor
- In office 6 March 2023 – 14 April 2026
- Preceded by: Office established
- Succeeded by: Vacant

Inspector-General of Police
- In office 11 March 2015 – 11 March 2019
- President: Uhuru Kenyatta
- Preceded by: David Kimaiyo
- Succeeded by: Hillary Nzioki Mutyambai

Chief Administrative Secretary for the Ministry of Tourism and Wildlife
- In office 2019–2022
- President: Uhuru Kenyatta

Personal details
- Born: 29 November 1962 (age 63) Elgeyo-Marakwet County, Kenya
- Occupation: Police officer

Joseph Boinett is a former Inspector General of the National Police Service of the Republic of Kenya and the current National Security Advisor of Kenya. Prior to his appointment, he served in the Kenyan National Intelligence Service. He is a holder of an International Studies and Diplomacy degree from the Washington International University, an unaccredited institution in the British Virgin Islands. He replaced David Kimaiyo.

== Early life and education ==
Joseph Kipchirchir Boinnet was born on 29 November 1962 in Elgeyo-Marakwet County, Kenya. He grew up in the Ainabkoi area of Uasin Gishu County. He attended Kipkabus Secondary School before completing his A-Level education at Baringo High School in 1980–1981. He subsequently studied international studies and diplomacy, obtaining degrees from Washington International University and the University of Malta. He later obtained master's degrees in national security policy and diplomatic studies from institutions in Australia and the United Kingdom.

== Career ==
Boinnet joined the Kenya Police Service in 1984 and rose through the ranks before transferring to the National Intelligence Service in 1998. He subsequently worked in diplomatic and security-related positions, including assignments connected with Kenya's missions abroad and the Ministry of Foreign Affairs.

In March 2015, Boinnet was appointed Inspector-General of the National Police Service, succeeding David Kimaiyo. He served in the position until 2019.

From 2019 to 2022, Boinnet served as Chief Administrative Secretary in the Ministry of Tourism and Wildlife.

In March 2023, he was appointed Deputy National Security Advisor in the administration of President William Ruto.

In April 2026, Boinnet succeeded Monica Juma as National Security Advisor. He formally assumed the position on 14 April 2026 at a handover ceremony at the University of Nairobi, following Juma's departure to take up a senior position with the United Nations.

== Personal life ==
Boinnet is married and has four children. He has generally kept his family life private.
