= Murder of Agnes Wanjiru =

Murder of Kenyan woman by British soldiers

The murder of Agnes Wanjiru took place in the town of Nanyuki, Kenya, in 2012. Her last known sighting was when she entered a hotel with British soldiers of the Duke of Lancaster's Regiment, after a night out. Wanjiru's body was discovered in the hotel's septic tank two months later.

The alleged murder and subsequent 'cover-up' by the British Army was widely covered in the British press in 2021 after the contents of a WhatsApp group chat involving soldiers of the Duke of Lancaster's Regiment were leaked to journalists, showing some of the soldiers accused of murdering Wanjiru mocking her death with memes related to murder, hotels, and septic tanks.

In late 2025, a British national and former Army combat medic, Robert James Purkiss was arrested in the UK on suspicion of the murder of Wanjiru and faces extradition to Kenya to stand trial.

== History ==
In 2012, a 21 year old Kenyan mother and part-time hairdresser, called Agnes Wanjiru, was allegedly murdered by soldiers of the Duke of Lancaster Regiment, with the murder reportedly covered up by British Army officials. Two months after she accompanied British soldiers into the Lion's Court Hotel bar in Nanyuki, her naked corpse was found in a septic tank next to the room in which soldiers of the Duke of Lancaster had stayed. Many British newspapers reported Agnes Wanjiru to be a prostitute, claims which have been disputed by her surviving family. Due to the advanced decay of her corpse, the post-mortem examination was unable to confirm whether or not she had been sexually assaulted prior to her death, but did ascertain that she had been stabbed in the lower abdomen, had a collapsed lung, and concluded Wanjiru “might have been alive when placed in the septic tank”. Some British newspapers reported that a soldier of the regiment confessed to being involved in the killing but was told to "shut up" when he attempted to report it. One of the soldiers within the regiment accused a fellow soldier of being party to the murder.

Despite a Kenyan inquest in 2018 finding that she had been "unlawfully killed" and the judge presiding finding that British soldiers had murdered her, for many years no soldiers were charged or convicted for the killing. In 2021, Defence Secretary Ben Wallace denied that the British military had covered-up Wanjiru's murder, but admitted guilt to and expressed concern over the Army hierarchy turning a "blind eye" to the use of prostitutes by personnel, especially within "countries in poverty". In 2022, UK armed forces introduced a ban on the use of sex workers abroad for the first time. Personnel found to have engaged in what the Ministry of Defence describes as "transactional sex" face the prospect of dismissal – and they could also be prosecuted if in countries where prostitution is illegal.

Esther Njoki, Wanjiru's niece, called on King Charles III to bring about justice for Wanjiru by bringing attention and urgency to her case. She wrote a letter to the King in 2023, asking him to visit her family and requested measures from the British crown forces’ commander-in-chief.

== 2021 WhatsApp leaks ==
In 2021, screenshots of a private Facebook group chat allegedly run by soldiers of the Duke of Lancaster's Regiment was published across British newspapers. The screenshots reportedly showed the regiment's soldiers joking and laughing at memes mocking the murder of Agnes Wanjiru. Soldiers of the regiment posted photographs of the outside of the hotel where Wanjiru was murdered with the caption "if you know you know" followed by laughing emojis. Other comments apparently mocking Agnes Wanjiru's murder include one soldier who commented "septic tank" with ghost emojis and various jokes about getting 'choked up'. The same soldier who allegedly murdered Agnes Wanjiru posted: "Come to think of it I have had a sore throat today." The leaking of the secret chats apparently mocking the murder sparked a reinvestigation into the case by Kenyan police.

== 2023 inquiry ==
In 2023, a wide-ranging inquiry into claims of abuse by the British Army was launched by the Kenyan government.

In April 2025, the UK Defence Secretary John Healey MP met family members of the late Agnes Wanjiru, expressing his condolences and offering the continued support of the UK Government to the Kenyan inquiry investigators.

On 13 August 2025, Kenya's Defence, Intelligence and Foreign Relations Committee called top officials from the British Army Training Unit Kenya (BATUK) "hostile witnesses" because they did not attend a Parliamentary meeting. Only Kenya's Defence Minister, Soipan Tuya, and her Principal Secretary attended. The committee believed BATUK avoided the meeting on purpose and warned there could be serious consequences, like arrest orders, fines, or continuing the investigation without them.

== 2025 arrest ==
On 16 September 2025, after evidence was presented in court, a Kenyan high court judge issued an arrest warrant for a British national suspected of murder. If extradited, it would be the first time a serving or former British soldier is sent abroad to stand trial for the killing of a civilian. On 21 September 2025, The Sunday Times named the suspect as Robert James Purkiss, a former combat medic, who served in the British Army from 2006 to 2016. On 6 November 2025, Purkiss was arrested by officers from the National Crime Agency (NCA) in the UK on suspicion of the murder of Wanjiru. While appearing in Westminster Magistrate’s Court in London for the extradition request, evidence was presented showing that inquiries had "uncovered confessions" made by Purkiss to fellow soldiers about the incident in Kenya, adding one spoke of seeing Purkiss "cry" and stating "I’ve killed her.” In another alleged confession, Purkiss is said to have told a colleague "it was sex that went wrong". In court Purkiss's lawyer stated that his client "vehemently denies" murder.

== See also ==
- British soldiers and allegations of sexual exploitation in Kenya
- Killing of Louise Jensen
