= Kenyans in the United Kingdom =

Kenyan Britons
Total population
- Kenya-born residents in the United Kingdom: 138,490 (2021/22 Census) (Note: Does not include ethnic Kenyans born in the United Kingdom or those with Kenyan ancestry); England: 133,416 (2021); Scotland: 3,179 (2022); Wales: 1,528 (2021); Northern Ireland: 367 (2021); Previous estimates: 129,633 (2001 census); 140,536 (2011 census); 121,000 (2019 ONS estimate)

Regions with significant populations
- London, South East England, East Midlands

Languages
- English (British, Kenyan), Swahili, Somali, Indian Languages

Religion
- Christianity, Sikhism, Islam, Hinduism

Kenyan migration to the United Kingdom has been occurring for many decades. As a result, many people in the UK were born in Kenya, or have Kenyan ancestry. The majority of Kenya-born people who migrated to the UK are of South Asian extraction.

== Background ==
Most Kenyans in the UK are ethnically South Asian Kenyans who, like those in Uganda, were expelled during the late 1960s and early 1970s. This community has a substantial cluster in Leicester and London. The most recent growth may now be coming from ethnically African Kenyans, mirroring wider trends across the continent of economic migration to the richer industrialised nations. There are also a small number of Kenyan-born people who are the children of British civil servants based there before the end of the Empire.

== Demographics ==
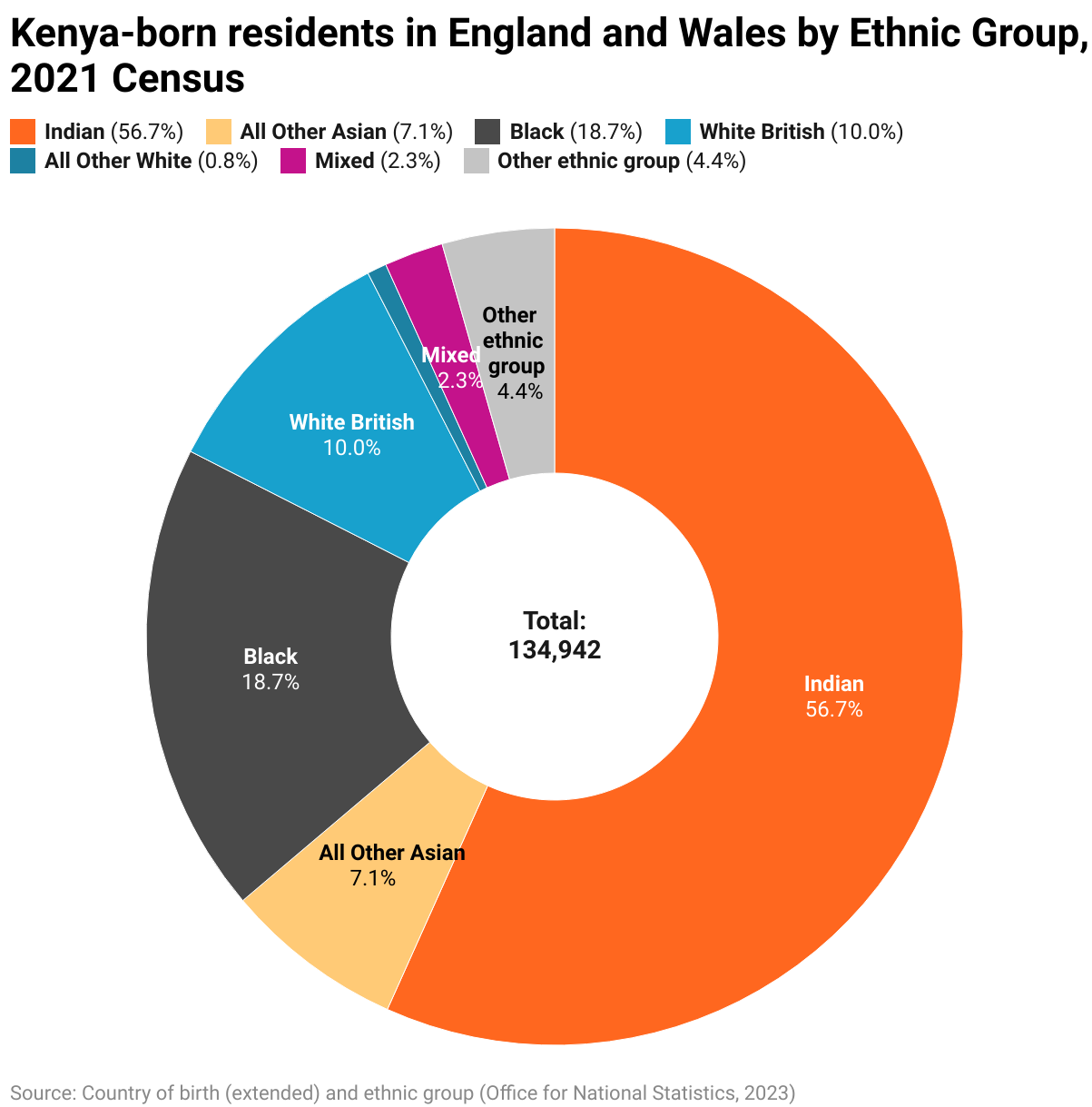
Kenya-born residents by ethnic group (2021 census, England and Wales)

The 2001 UK Census recorded 129,633 Kenyan-born British residents. The 2011 census recorded 135,966 Kenyan-born people resident in England, 1,526 in Wales, 2,743 in Scotland and 301 in Northern Ireland, making a UK total of 140,536. The equivalent UK figure in 2019 has been estimated at 121,000 by the Office for National Statistics.

The largest proportion of Kenyan-born British residents are found in the capital, London, where around half of the Kenyan-born population in Britain resides. There are also significant populations in the South East and the East Midlands.

Religion of Kenyan Born - England and Wales
Religion	Census 2021	
Religion	Number	%
Hinduism	46,664	34.6%
Christianity	33,815	25.1%
Islam	17,848	13.2%
Sikhism	13,318	9.9%
No Religion	8,924	6.6%
Other Religions	8,534	6.3%
Buddhism	206	0.2%
Judaism	103	0.1%
Not Stated	5,533	4.1%
Total	134,945	100%

== Famous Britons born in Kenya ==
=== Academia, medicine and science ===
- Richard Dawkins, ethologist, biologist, writer
- Azim Nanji, academic
- Alan Rayner, biologist
- Sir Nilesh Samani, physician
- Sir Tejinder Virdee, physicist

=== Business, law and politics ===
- Michael Bear, former Lord Mayor of London
- Peter Hain, former Labour MP, cabinet minister and currently member of the House of Lords
- Baroness Prashar, businesswoman
- Lord Sheikh, businessman, Conservative politician

=== Music and the arts ===
- Khadambi Asalache, poet
- Kamara Bacchus, actress
- Kuljit Bhamra, musician
- Gurinder Chadha, film director
- Nitin Ganatra, actor
- Kulvinder Ghir, comedian
- Tania Harcourt-Cooze, model and actress
- Elspeth Huxley, author, journalist, broadcaster
- Viram Jasani, musician
- Michael Kuhn, film producer
- Charles Mnene, actor
- Dev Patel, actor
- Deep Roy, actor, stuntman
- Roger Whittaker, musician
- Imran Yusuf, comedian
- Adrian Zagoritis, music producer and songwriter

=== Sport ===
- Roger Chapman, golfer
- Jamie Dalrymple, cricketer
- Chris Froome, racing cyclist
- Rajesh Maru, cricketer
- Derek Pringle, cricketer
- Peter Thackeray, cricketer
- Curtis Osano, footballer
- Victor Wanyama, footballer
- Simon Shaw, rugby union player
- Anne Wafula Strike, wheelchair racing

== See also ==
- Black British
- British Mixed
- British African-Caribbean community
- Kenya–United Kingdom relations
- Kenyan Australians
- Kenyan Americans
