= Hillary Mutyambai =

Inspector-General of police in Kenya

Hillary Nzioki Mutyambai MGH

Inspector-General of the National Police Service
- In office 8 April 2019 – 27 September 2022
- President: Uhuru Kenyatta
- Preceded by: Joseph Boinnet
- Succeeded by: Japhet Koome

Personal details
- Born: 1964 (age 61–62) Mwala, Machakos County, Kenya
- Spouse: Susan Nzioki
- Children: 2
- Education: University of Nairobi; Australian National University
- Occupation: Police officer

Hillary Nzioki Mutyambai (born 1964) is a Kenyan former police officer who served as Inspector-General of the National Police Service from 2019 to 2022. He previously worked in the National Intelligence Service and held senior positions in counter-terrorism and intelligence.

== Early life and education ==
Mutyambai was born in 1964 in Mwala, Machakos County, Kenya. He was raised in a Christian family and attended Pope Paul VI Junior Seminary School in Machakos. Before joining the security services, he worked as a teacher, teaching biology, mathematics and physics at his former school.

He studied at the University of Nairobi, where he obtained a bachelor's degree. He later obtained a Master of Arts degree in National Security Policy from the Australian National University.

== Career ==
Mutyambai joined the Kenya Police Service in 1991 and rose to the rank of Superintendent of Police. In 1998, he joined the Directorate of Security Intelligence, subsequently becoming a senior intelligence officer in the National Intelligence Service. He served as a regional intelligence coordinator in Nairobi and Mombasa and later became Deputy Director in charge of Counter-Terrorism.

Mutyambai also served as a political attaché at the Kenya High Commission in Kampala, Uganda, from 2000 to 2004.

He received specialist training in counter-terrorism and advanced security in the United States, operational management in the United Kingdom, and policing, intelligence and counter-terrorism in Israel.

=== Inspector-General of Police ===
In March 2019, President Uhuru Kenyatta nominated Mutyambai to succeed Joseph Boinnet as Inspector-General of the National Police Service. He was subsequently approved and sworn into office on 8 April 2019.

As Inspector-General, Mutyambai was responsible for the Kenya Police Service, Administration Police Service, Directorate of Criminal Investigations and General Service Unit. During his tenure he oversaw policing and national-security operations, including the government's response to terrorism and the COVID-19 pandemic.

Mutyambai left office in September 2022. The Kenya Police Service records his tenure as 2019–2022, with Japhet Koome subsequently becoming Inspector-General.

== Personal life ==
Mutyambai is married to Susan Nzioki and they have two children.

He has described his Christian faith as an important part of his background and reportedly considered entering the Catholic priesthood before pursuing a career in policing and intelligence.
