= Ghada Waly =

Egyptian politician, UNODC director (2020-2025)

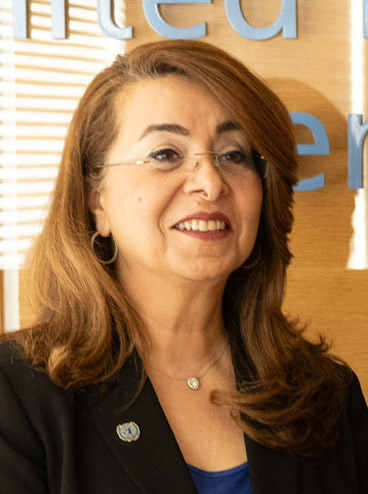
Waly in 2024

Ghada Fathi Waly (Arabic: غادة والي; born 1966) is an Egyptian politician, formerly serving as Egypt's Minister of Social Solidarity and Executive Director of the United Nations Office on Drugs and Crime (UNODC) between 2020 and 2025, following her appointment by Secretary-General António Guterres.

== Education ==
Ghada Waly holds an MA and a BA from Colorado State University (US) in Humanities; she also holds a diploma in international development and a diploma in Project Management and is certified in Micro Finance from University of Colorado Boulder. She is fluent in Arabic, English and French and has a working knowledge of Spanish.

== Career ==
=== Egypt ===
Waly served as Minister of Social Solidarity of Egypt from March 2014 until December 2019. She also served as the Coordinator of the Inter-Ministerial Committee for Social Justice and chaired the Executive Council of Arab Ministers of Social Affairs in the League of Arab States from 2014 to 2019. She was the Chairperson of Nasser Social Bank, a pro-poor developmental financial institution. She chaired the boards of the National Center for Social and Criminology Research, the National Fund for Drug and Addiction Control and the National Authority of Social Insurance, which serves 25 million Egyptians. She also sat on the boards of the Social Housing Fund in the Ministry of Housing and Urban Development, the Unplanned Settlement Fund, the Youth Fund and the National Management Institute.

Waly sits on the board of a number of civil society organizations and is an advocate for women’s economic and social empowerment and for SMEs. She also served as the vice-chairperson of the Egyptian Red Crescent Association.

=== International Organizations ===
She has held leadership positions as Managing Director of Social Fund for Development (SFD), a multimillion-dollar SME Fund, and as Assistant Resident Representative for poverty reduction at the United Nations Development Program (UNDP), where she was responsible for coordinating the Millennium Development Goals reports and launched the National Strategy for Micro Finance. She served as Micro Finance and Access to Finance Advisor to the Chairman of Egypt’s Financial Supervisory Authority and Executive Committee Member. She was Program Director of CARE International in Egypt, working in poverty alleviation in upper Egypt. She was elected co-chair of the SMEs donors’ subgroup for six years.

In 2020, she was appointed by Secretary-General António Guterres as Executive Director of the UNODC and Director General of the United Nations Office at Vienna (UNOV) a position with the rank of Under-Secretary-General of the United Nations that she held until 2025.

== Public profile ==
She was voted the most influential woman in Egypt in 2016, according to Baseera Public Opinion Research Center and was chosen by Forbes Middle East as one of the ten most powerful Arab women in government for 2015, 2016, 2017 and 2018.

== Other activities ==
- Joint United Nations Programme on HIV/AIDS (UNAIDS), Ex-Officio Member of the Committee of Cosponsoring Organizations (since 2020)
- International Gender Champions (IGC), Member (since 2020)

Positions in intergovernmental organisations
| Preceded by (Russia) Yury Fedotov | Executive Director of the United Nations Office on Drugs and Crime; 2020-2025 | Succeeded by (Kenya) Monica Juma |
