= British soldiers and allegations of sexual exploitation in Kenya =

British soldiers and allegations of sexual exploitation in Kenya refers in particularly to those serving in the British Army Training Unit Kenya (BATUK). For many years British soldiers serving there have faced allegations of sexual exploitation, abuse, and related misconduct involving local women and girls. Investigations, news stories, and court cases have shown a pattern of no punishment, system failure, and slow justice.

== Background ==
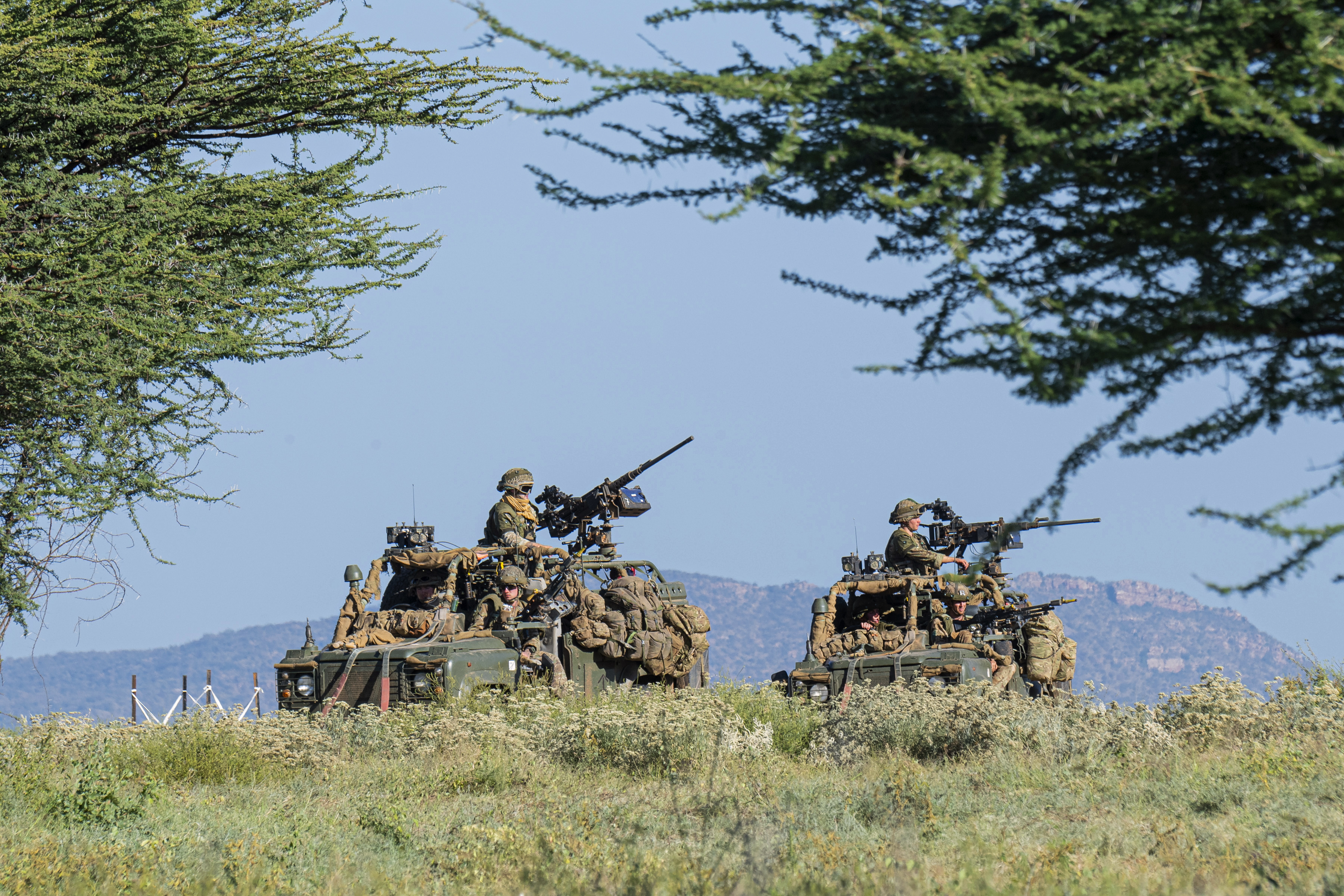

Since Kenya declared its independence in 1963, the United Kingdom was permitted to train its troops there twice a year. BATUK is the main training facility of the British troops, from which they have access to large number of training areas made available by the Kenyan authorities. This agreement gives Kenya an annual income of about £58 million. People in and around Nanyuki have expressed concern over how residents are treated, harm to the environment, and the unfair effects of having troops in the area.

== History of sexual violence allegations ==
Ever since Kenya gained its independence in 1963 with British troops stationed in the country, there have been allegations of rape and other crimes of sexual violence perpetrated by them. Amnesty published a summarized report from 1965 to 2001, noting 650 allegations of sexual crimes, including gang rape. According to the report, some victims were minors, and many cases went uninvestigated by both UK and Kenyan authorities. Legal investigations keep pointing out that such crimes are still taking place.

== Notable cases ==
Even before the Amnesty report, cases of sexual abuse and violence by British troops were reported. During the Mau Mau rebellion in the 1950s reports of rape and sexual violence were recorded, ending with 56 British soldier tried, 17 of them convicted sentenced to six years over allegations of gang rape.

=== Murder of Agnes Wanjiru ===
One of the most notable cases is the one of Agnes Wanjiru. The incident took place in March 2012, when 21 year old Agnes Wanjiru disappeared after being last seen with soldiers from the Duke of Lancaster's Regiment at a hotel in Nanyuki. Her body was found two months later in a septic tank. The investigation concluded in 2019 that Wanjiru was murdered by one or more British soldiers. Even though the investigation is conclusive, no arrests were made, leaving the case then unresolved. During 2021, some leaked screenshots from a private Facebook group emerged. The group was claimed to by run by soldiers of the Duke of Lancaster's Regiment and it showed members joking about the murder case. The posts in the group included memes, hotel photos captioned “if you know you know” with laughing emojis, and comments referencing the murder with mocking remarks. This caused the Kenyan police to reopen the case and resume the investigation.

In 2025 it was reported that by the month of June, at least 20 soldiers had come forward as witnesses. This caused Kenya's police to recommend murder charges. This development in the case might cause an unprecedented move in which British soldiers would be extradited.

On 16 September, 2025, a high court judge in Kenya issued an arrest warrant for a British national suspect after sufficient evidence was presented to him by the prosecutors. If the British soldier were to be extradited, it would be the first time in history that a serving or former soldier would be sent abroad to stand trial. On September 21, 2025, Robert James Purkiss, a former combat medic who served in the British Army from 2006 to 2016, was named the suspect. He was arrested by specialist officers from the National Crime Agency's National Extradition Unit on November 6, 2025, in Tidworth, Wiltshire and appeared at Westminster Magistrates Court the next day.

== Policy changes and continued reports ==
The UK Ministry of Defense led a zero-tolerance ban during 2012 on soldiers serving abroad paying for sex, saying it could lead to exploitation and abuse. But investigations in 2024 and 2025 found that many soldiers were still suspected of doing so in Kenya, showing the rule hasn't been strongly enforced. 24 allegations were investigated since the ban; none were proven, but again, no sanctions were reported.

== Children fathered by soldiers ==
Many Kenyan women say they have had children with British soldiers, who often left them and their children when they returned to the UK. Some of these children have tried to get legal recognition and citizenship. In 2024, a UK High Court told the Ministry of Defense to reveal the names of soldiers suspected of fathering these children, which could help with legal claims for support and nationality.

== Parliamentary inquiry and accountability efforts ==
Since 2003, Kenya's Parliament has begun a thorough investigation about the British Army Training Unit Kenya. This investigation looks into claims of sexual violence, murder, environmental harm, and land disputes. BATUK and the British High Commission have said they will fully cooperate. For any bad behavior by British soldiers when they are off duty, Kenyan authorities have the main legal power to take action.

In April 2024, the Kenyan parliament voted in favor of amending the agreement of defence with the UK according to which British soldiers were prosecuted locally. A 94-page inquiry into the conduct of BATUK troops was released which said British troops in BATUK showed a “disturbing trend” of sexual misconduct — including rape, assault, and neglect of children they fathered — while past internal inquiries failed to deliver justice. The report also cites severe environmental damage from unassessed military exercises, including a massive fire that destroyed 4,900 hectares, illegal dumping of toxic waste, and unsafe handling of unexploded ordnance that caused deaths and injuries. Communities were not warned about loud drills, local workers lacked protective gear, and many complainants were unfairly compensated.

== See also ==
- British Army Training Unit Kenya
- Sexual harassment in the military
- Prostitution in Kenya
- Kenya–United Kingdom relations
- Murder of Agnes Wanjiru
