= Maiyo =

Maiyo is a surname of Kenyan origin. It also means "alcohol" in Kalenjin. Notable people with the surname include:

- Benjamin Maiyo (born 1978), Kenyan long-distance track and road runner
- Jonathan Maiyo (born 1988), Kenyan long-distance track and marathon runner
- Maureen Jelagat Maiyo (born 1985), Kenyan 400 metres hurdler and 2012 Olympian

== See also ==
- Kimaiyo, related name meaning "boy born in the presence of alcohol"
