= Raychelle Omamo =

Kenyan lawyer and politician

Ambassador Raychelle Omamo
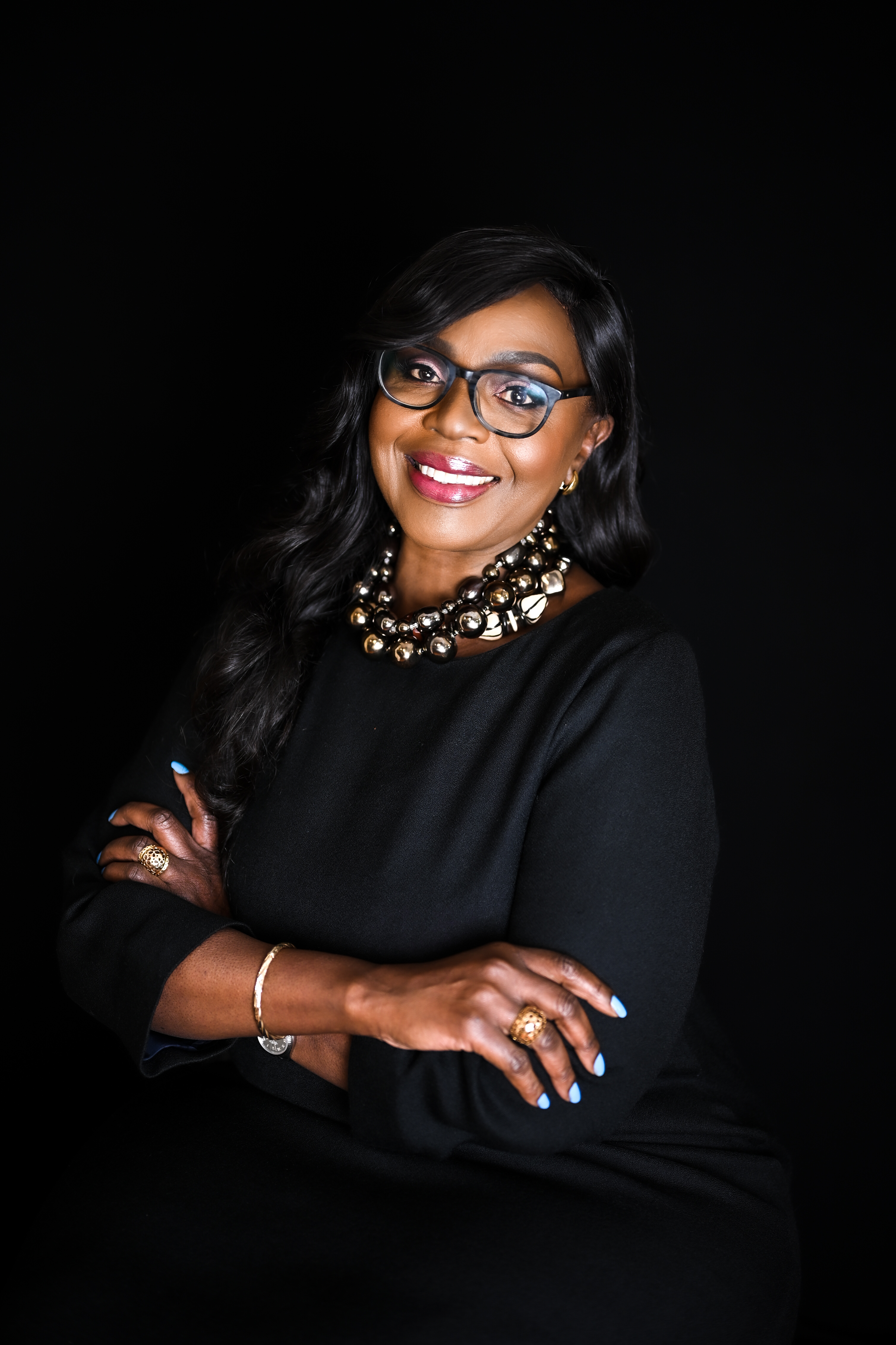

Cabinet Secretary for Foreign Affairs
- In office 14 January 2020 – 27 October 2022
- President: Uhuru Kenyatta
- Preceded by: Monica Juma
- Succeeded by: Alfred Mutua

Cabinet Secretary for Defence
- In office 15 May 2013 – 14 January 2020
- President: Uhuru Kenyatta
- Preceded by: Mohamed Yusuf Haji
- Succeeded by: Monica Juma

Personal details
- Born: 6 July 1962 (age 64) Bondo, Central Nyanza, Kenya Colony
- Parent: William Odongo Omamo (father)
- Education: University of Kent, Canterbury, UK
- Profession: Advocate
- Religion: Christian

Raychelle Awuor Omamo (born July 1962) is a Kenyan lawyer and diplomat and former Cabinet Minister. She is an advocate of the High Court of Kenya. From 2020 to 2022, she was the Kenyan Foreign Affairs Minister.

== Early life and education ==
Omamo is a daughter to the late cabinet minister William Odongo Omamo. She studied law at the University of Kent at Canterbury, UK.

== Early career ==
Omamo began her career as a lawyer in private practice and was the first female Chairperson of Law Society of Kenya from 2001 to 2003 after serving as a Council member. She was conferred with the rank and privilege of Senior Counsel in 2012. She was a member of the Task Force on the Establishment of the Truth Justice and Reconciliation Commission for Kenya.

Omamo was Kenya's first female ambassador to France with accreditation to Spain, Portugal, The Holy See and Serbia as well as the Permanent Delegate of the Kenya to UNESCO.

== Political career ==
Omamo served as the Cabinet Secretary for Foreign Affairs. Previously, she served as the Cabinet Secretary for Defence for 7 years in the Uhuru Kenyatta administration, the first female in the country to hold the post. She also served as the Acting Cabinet Secretary for Labour and Social Services in 2014.

In 2022, Omamo was nominated as Kenya's candidate to succeed Gilbert Houngbo as president of the International Fund for Agricultural Development (IFAD); she ultimately lost out against Alvaro Lario.

== Podcast ==
Omamo's podcast - The Power Panel Podcast - was launched in 2024 under the umbrella of her organization Bird Song Africa Productions Limited.

Bird Song Africa Productions Limited is dedicated to the amplification of the voices of African women trail-blazers to share, inspire and encourage the next generation of African women leaders.

== Other activities ==
- Munich Security Conference, Member of the Advisory Council (since 2023)
- Amref Flying Doctors, Member of the Board of Directors

== See also ==
- Faith Odhiambo
- Kalpana Rawal
- Nancy Baraza
- Philomena Mwilu
