= David Kimaiyo =

Kenyan police officer (born 1960)

David Mwole Kimaiyo CBS EBS MBS

Inspector-General of the National Police Service
- In office 24 December 2012 – 2 December 2014
- President: Mwai Kibaki; Uhuru Kenyatta
- Preceded by: Office established
- Succeeded by: Joseph Boinnet

Personal details
- Born: 1 July 1960 (age 66) Kenya
- Education: University of Nairobi; University of Leicester; University of South Africa
- Occupation: Police officer

David Mwole Kimaiyo (born July 1, 1960) is a Kenyan police officer. He was the first Inspector General of the Kenya Police, a position created by the 2010 Kenyan Constitution to replace the position of Police commissioner. He was the first Kenya head of police whose appointment required approval by parliament.

== Education ==
He has a PhD in Sociology and Criminology from University of Nairobi, an MSc in Criminology and Criminal Justice from University of Leicester UK, Master of Arts in Theology, Bachelor of Arts Degree in Criminology and Criminal Administration attained at the University of South Africa (UNISA). Kimaiyo also holds a Bachelor of Theology and a Master of Theology both from the Beacon University of Institute Ministry.

== Career ==
Kimaiyo served as the Commander Presidential Escort Unit (PEU) from 1999 to 2002 before taking up the position of Commandant General Service Unit (GSU) between 2002 and 2003. He subsequently worked for one year as coordinator of the Kenya National Focal Point on Small Arms and Light Weapons before taking up the role of Director of Operations of the Kenya Police until 2008. Between 2008 – 2009, he worked as a Senior Deputy Secretary in the Ministry of National Heritage. Prior to his appointment as Inspector General, he was Head of the Kenya National Focal Point on Small Arms and Light Weapons. Mr. Kimaiyo retired from National Police Service on December 2, 2014. This happened after a series of killings claimed by Al Shabaab on the Kenyan border town of Mandera

=== Inspector General of the Kenya Police ===
Kimaiyo applied for the position of Inspector General in 2012 and was interviewed by the National Police Service Commission. He emerged as the leading candidate followed by his deputy at the Small Arms, Mr John Patrick Ochieng’ Owino with Grace Kaindi of the Kenya Airports Police Unit emerging third. He was then appointed by President Mwai Kibaki in consultation with Raila Odinga as required by the constitution awaiting approval by the National Assembly. He was subsequently approved by parliament and took his oath of office administered by Chief Justice Willy Mutunga on 24 December 2012 after appointment by President Mwai Kibaki.

== Awards ==
He holds the awards of Order of the Chief of Burning Spear (CBS), Order of the Elder of the Burning Spear (EBS), Order of the Moran of the Burning Spear (MBS).
