= Inspector-general of police (Kenya) =

Position in the Kenya police force

Inspector General of National Police Service

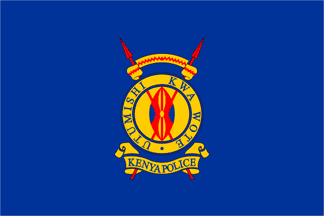
- Flag of the Kenya Police Force

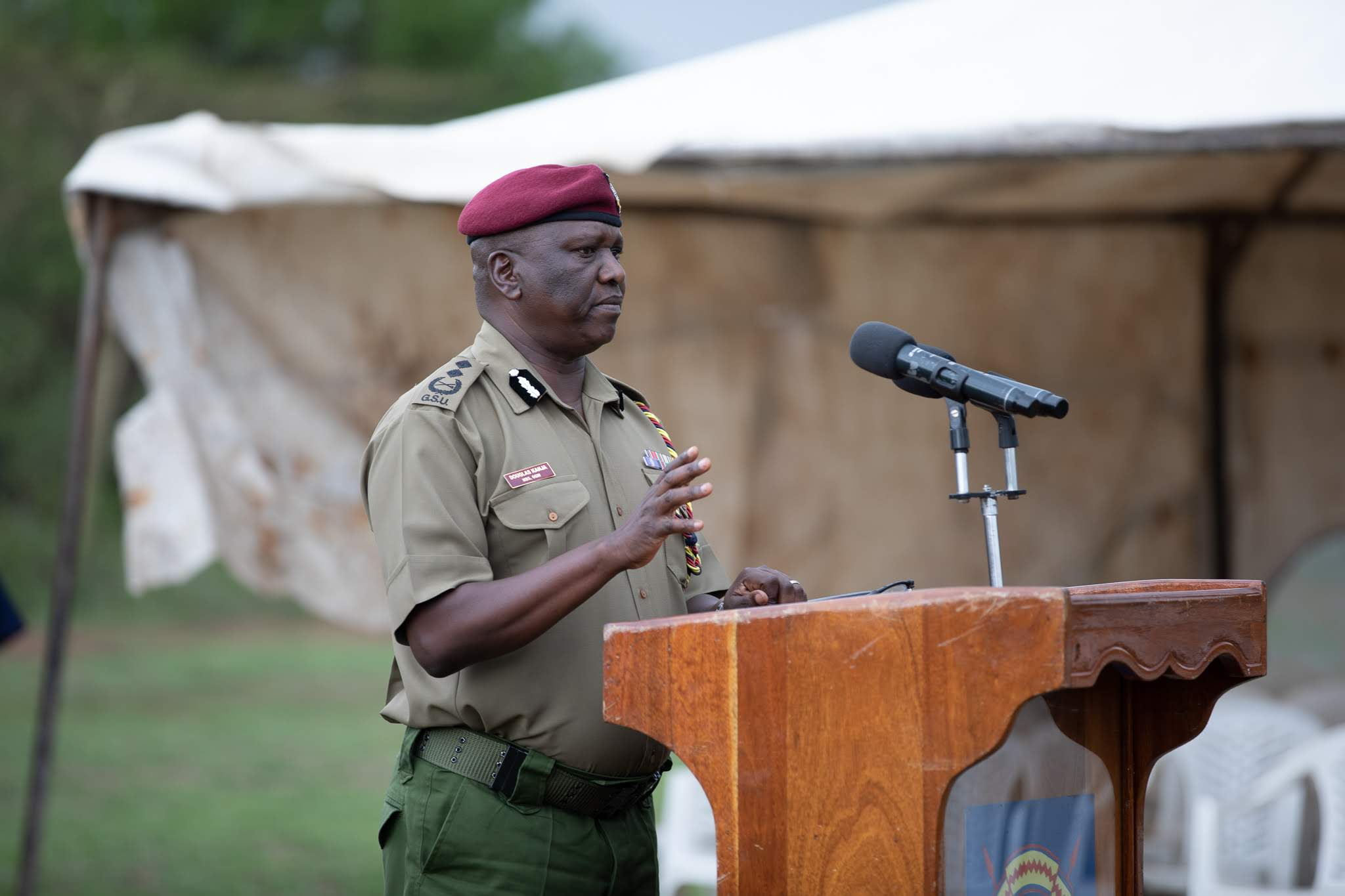
- Incumbent; Douglas Kanja Kirocho since 12 July 2024
- Member of: National Police Service
- Seat: Vigilance House, Harambee Ave, Nairobi
- Appointer: President of Kenya
- Term length: 4 years (non-renewable)
- Inaugural holder: Bernard Hinga
- Formation: 1964 (as commissioner of police); 2012 (as inspector-general)
- Deputy: Deputy Inspector General
- Salary: Ksh. 800,241.
- Website: https://www.kenyapolice.go.ke/

The Inspector-General of police, abbreviated as IG, is the highest ranked officer of the Kenya Police Force, responsible for commanding and leading the Kenya Police. He is also in charge of overall and independent command and matter of the National Police Service. The position was established in 1964 as the Commissioner of Police. It was renamed to Inspector-General of Police in 2012, to serve as the head of the two police bodies of Kenya for a four-year term. The Kenya Police Service and the Administration Police Service is also headed by a deputy inspector-general who is appointed by the president of Kenya and approved by the parliament. The current inspector-general as of July 2024 is Douglas Kanja, in the acting capacity following the resignation of the previous IG, Japheth N. Koome.

== History ==
From 1906 to 1964 the force was headed by British officers. In 2012, the position of Inspector General was introduced to head the newly created National Police Service.

== List of officeholders ==
=== Commissioner of police (1964–2012) ===
The following officers have to date served in the capacity of Commissioner of Police:

- Bernard Hinga (1964–1978)
- Ben Gethi (1978–1982)
- Bernard Njinu (1982–1988)
- Phillip Kilonzo (1988–1993)
- Shedrack Kiruki (1993–1996)
- Duncan Wachira (1996–1998)
- Philemon Abong’o (1998–2002)
- Edwin Nyaseda (2002–2003)
- Major General Mohammed Hussein Ali (2004–2009)
- Mathew Kirai Iteere (2009–2012)

=== Inspectors-general of police (2012–present) ===
- David Mwole Kimaiyo (2012–2014)
- Samuel Arachi (acting) (31 December 2014 – 11 March 2015)
- Joseph Boinnet (11 March 2015 – March 2019)
- Hillary Nzioki Mutyambai (8 April 2019 – 27 September 2022)
- Japeth Koome (November 2022 – 2024)
- Douglas Kanja (12 July 2024 - Present)
