= Ministry of Defence (Kenya) =

Government ministry of Kenya

- Wizara ya Ulinzi
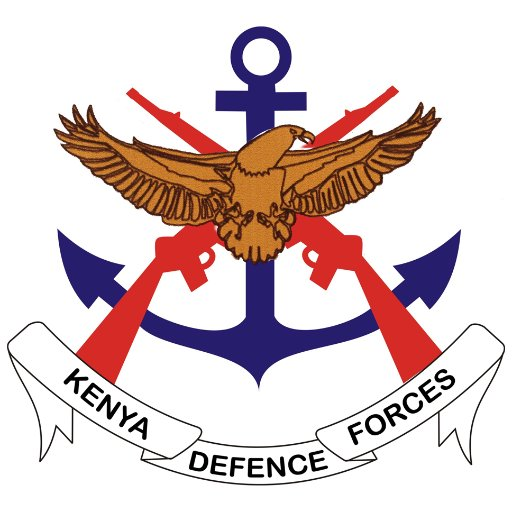

Agency overview
- Jurisdiction: Government of Kenya
- Headquarters: Ulinzi House, Lenana Road; Nairobi
- Agency executives: Soipan Tuya, Cabinet Secretary; Peter Odoyo, Chief Administrative Secretary; Ibrahim Mohamed, Principal Secretary
- Parent agency: Cabinet of Kenya
- Website: https://mod.go.ke/

The Ministry of Defence (MoD) of Kenya is a cabinet-level office in charge of defense-related matters of Kenya. It oversees the Kenya Defence Forces. It is currently headed by Soipan Tuya.

== History ==
During the Shifta War, a centralized high command was established, however the Ministry of Defence was mostly dormant with the service commanders under the direct operational control of the president. From 1979-2000, Ministry of Defence was renamed to the Department of Defence (DoD), placed under the Office of the President Daniel arap Moi and led by the Deputy Secretary. The DoD dealt mostly with administrative and logistical matters.

== Building ==
The Ministry of Defence is located at Ulinzi House off Lenana Road in Nairobi.

== Structure ==
- Administration Department
- Finance Department
- Accounts Department
- Head of Public Communications
- Director Policy, Strategy and Planning
- Human Resource Management and Development
- Supply Chain Department
- Internal Auditor General
- Information Communications Technology

== Cabinet Secretary ==
The Cabinet Secretary oversees the Ministry of Defence and is the policy maker of the KDF and chief defence policy advisor to the President of Kenya. He/She serves as Chairman of the Defence Council, the supreme body of the MoD that manages the Kenya Defence Forces.

=== List ===
==== Minister of Defence ====
- Jomo Kenyatta (1963-1964)
- Njoroge Mungai (1964-1969)
- James Gichuru (1969-1978)

==== Minister of State for Defence ====
- Julius Lekakeny Sunkuli (2000-2003)
- Chris Murungaru (2003-2005)
- Njenga Karume (2006-2008)
- Mohamed Yusuf Haji (2008–2013)

==== Cabinet Secretary for Defense ====
- Raychelle Omamo (2013–2020)
- Monica Juma (2020–2021)
- Eugene Wamalwa (2021–2022)
- Aden Duale (2022–2024)
- Soipan Tuya (2024–)

== Defence Council ==
The duties and responsibilities of the Defence Council are to oversee overall policy and supervise the KDF:

- Secretary (Chairman)
- Chief of the Defence Forces (CDF)
- The three commanders of the KDF
- MoD Principal Secretary

== See also ==
- President of Kenya
- Kenya Defence Forces
