= Douglas Kanja Kirocho =

Kenyan police officer

Douglas Kanja Kirocho CBS, OGW
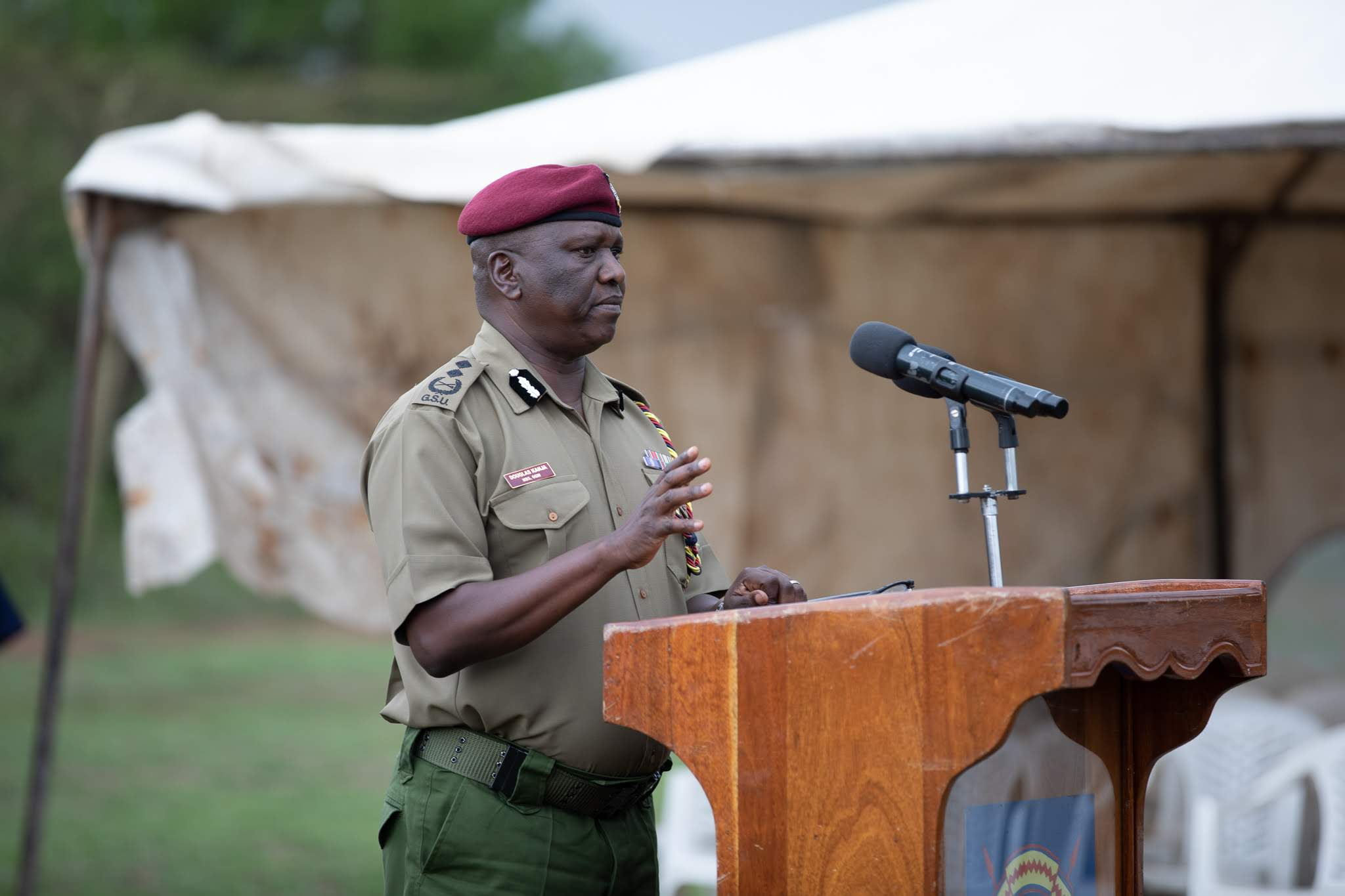

Inspector General of the National Police Service
- Incumbent
- Assumed office September 19, 2024
- President: William Ruto
- Deputy: Eliud Lagat - KPS; Gilbert Masengeli - APS
- Preceded by: Gilbert Masengeli (Acting)

Personal details
- Born: Douglas Kanja Kirocho
- Occupation: Police Officer

Military service
- Rank: Inspector General

Douglas Kanja Kirocho is a Kenyan police officer and the current inspector-general of police of the National Police Service of Kenya. Appointed by President William Ruto and confirmed through parliamentary vetting, Kanja took office on September 19, 2024. His career in Kenya's law enforcement spans nearly four decades, marked by progressive leadership roles and significant contributions to public security in Kenya.

== Career ==
Kanja joined the Kenya Police Service in 1985 as a recruit police constable. Over his career, he rose through various ranks, holding prominent roles, including deputy inspector general of the Kenya Police Service and commandant of the General Service Unit (GSU), where he served for five years. Prior to his appointment as inspector general, Kanja also held positions such as deputy commandant of the General Service Unit, county police commander of Kilifi, deputy commandant of the Kenya Airports Police Unit, chief armourer at police headquarters, and deputy chief armourer at kenya police headquarters.

=== Inspector General of the National Police Service ===
In September 2024, Kanja was nominated by President William Ruto to serve as the inspector general of the National Police Service. His nomination was unanimously confirmed by the Kenyan Parliament after he successfully completed the vetting process. During the confirmation hearings, legislators cited his extensive experience and commitment to the police service as key qualifications for the role.

== Responsibilities ==
As inspector general, Kanja oversees Kenya’s principal law enforcement bodies, which include the Kenya Police Service, the Administration Police Service, and the Directorate of Criminal Investigations. His responsibilities include implementing policing reforms, modernizing police operations, and maintaining public safety and security.
