= Strathmore Law School =

Kenyan Law school

Strathmore Law School (SLS) is one of the constituent schools of Strathmore University, a non-profit private university in Nairobi, Kenya.

The school launched on April 28, 2012, after 8 years of student-led incubation.

In June 2019, SLS defeated Harvard Law School in the final of the 17th John H. Jackson Moot Court Competition on WTO Law in Geneva, Switzerland. They became the first African team to win this prestigious global competition.

In 2022, Strathmore and Notre Dame launched an exchange student partnership to allow 2 students from each school to spend a semester attending the other institution.
