= Peter Thackeray =

English cricketer (born 1950)

Personal information
- Full name: Peter Robert Thackeray
- Born: 26 September 1950 (age 76); Nairobi, Nairobi Province, Kenya
- Batting: Right-handed
- Bowling: Right-arm medium

Domestic team information
- Years: Team
- 1974: Oxford University
- 1972: Devon

Career statistics
Competition	First-class
Matches	8
Runs scored	315
Batting average	28.63
100s/50s	–/2
Top score	65*
Balls bowled	3
Wickets	–
Bowling average	–
5 wickets in innings	–
10 wickets in match	–
Best bowling	–
Catches/stumpings	3/–
- Source: Cricinfo, 17 March 2011

Peter Robert Thackeray (born 26 September 1950) is a Kenyan born former English cricketer. Thackeray was a right-handed batsman who bowled right-arm medium pace. He was born in Nairobi, Kenya.

Thackeray played three times for Devon in the 1972 Minor Counties Championship against Cornwall, the Somerset Second XI and Oxfordshire. He made his first-class debut for Oxford University against Leicestershire in 1974. He made seven further first-class appearances for the university in 1974, playing his final first-class match in the 1974 University Match against Cambridge University at Lord's. In his eight first-class matches, Thackeray scored 315 runs at a batting average of 28.63, with two half centuries and a high score of 65* against Worcestershire.
