= Soipan Tuya =

Kenyan lawyer and politician

The Honorable Soipan Tuya
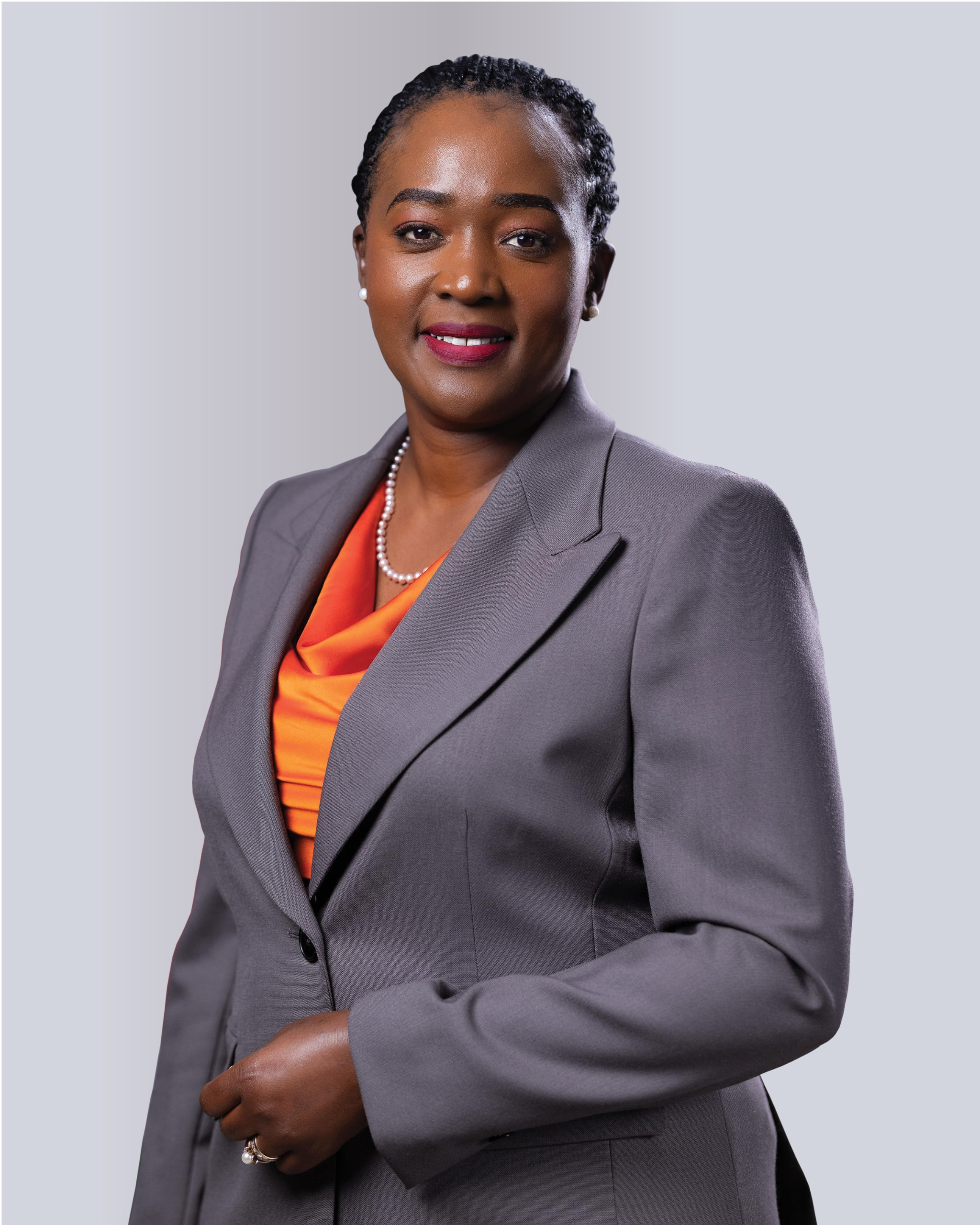
- Roselinda Soipan Tuiya in 2025

Cabinet Secretary for Defence
- Incumbent
- Assumed office August 8, 2024
- President: William Ruto
- Preceded by: Aden Duale

Cabinet Secretary for Environment, Climate Change, and Forestry
- In office October 2022 – July 11, 2024
- President: William Ruto
- Preceded by: Keriako Tobiko
- Succeeded by: Deborah Mlongo Barasa

Member of Parliament for Narok County (County woman representative)
- In office 28 March 2013 – 22 October 2022

Personal details
- Born: Roselinda Soipan Tuya; 24 July 1982
- Education: University of Nairobi

Roselinda Soipan Tuya is a Kenyan politician and parliamentarian who serves as the Cabinet Secretary for Defence of Kenya, having been sworn into office by President William Ruto on 8 August 2024. Prior to this role, Tuya served as the Cabinet Secretary for Environment, Climate Change, and Forestry.

== Early life and career ==
She was born on 24 July 1982. Tuya is the daughter of former Narok South MP Samson Ole Tuiya. She attended Kenya High School from 1995 to 1998 for her Kenya certificate of secondary education. she studied law at the University of Nairobi from 1999 to 2002 graduating with a bachelor of laws (LL.B) and a master's degree in law (LL.M) from University of Washington (2009 - 2010). From 2004 to 2006, she was a legal advisor to the Mainyoito Pastoralist Integrated Development Organization. From 2006 to 2008, she was a Legal Officer at the Ministry of Justice & Constitutional Affairs.

== Parliament ==
Tuiya served as women's representative for Narok County from 2013 to 2022. During her parliamentary career, she was a member of the Committee on Implementation (Chairperson) and the Departmental Committee on Defence & Foreign Relations, the Committee on Justice and Legal Affairs and the Procedure and House Rules Committee.
