= British Army Training Unit Kenya =

British Army training support unit in Kenya

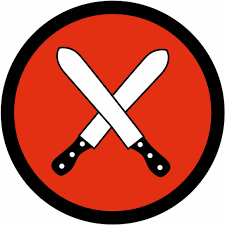
- Branch: British Army
- Role: Training support
- Size: 300 (permanent); 550 (local civilians) up to 10,000 (training, per year)
- Garrison/HQ: Nyati Barracks, Nanyuki

The British Army Training Unit Kenya (BATUK) is a training support unit of the British Army located in Kenya.

On 3 June 1964, Duncan Sandys, Secretary of State for Commonwealth Relations, signed a post-independence defence agreement with the new Kenyan government. Among its other provisions, it specified that British troops could exercise in Kenya twice a year.

Today, BATUK administers and facilitates British Army access to the large number of training areas made available by the Kenyan authorities. These training areas make possible combined arms light and mechanised role infantry battlegroup and brigade exercises, as well as civil engineering and medical projects for the local population, funded by the British Army.

Under an agreement with the Kenyan Government, up to six infantry battalions per year carry out eight-week exercises in Kenya. There are also three Royal Engineers squadron exercises which carry out civil engineering projects, as well as two Army Medical Services medical company group deployments.

British Army troops also help prevent poaching of endangered species such as rhinos and elephants, and contribute an estimated £58 million to the Kenyan economy each year.

BATUK has two installations: Nyati Barracks at Laikipia Air Base in Nanyuki contains the headquarters, accommodation, mess, stores and offices; and Kifaru Barracks is a rear base and logistical hub in Nairobi; it sits within Kahawa Barracks, hosted by the Kenya Army.

Over the years, a number of British soldiers deploying to BATUK for training have been involved in criminal acts, which have attracted media attention in both Britain and Kenya. Allegations and court cases have included murder, brawls, rape, sexual assault, an alleged child kidnapping, environmental damage, fatal hit-and-runs, and sexual exploitation of Kenyan women.

== Current status ==
The UK Ministry of Defence (MoD) maintains a longstanding Defence Cooperation Agreement with the Kenyan Government whereby up to six British infantry battalions (10,000 service personnel) per year may carry out eight-week exercises on Kenya Ministry of Defence land at Archer's Post and in Laikipia County.

The exercises are run by BATUK from its base at Nyati Barracks in Nanyuki, 200 km north of the capital.

Britain offers training opportunities in the UK to the Kenyan military and conducts joint exercises with the Kenya Defence Forces (KDF). From 2019 to 2021, the British Army and the Kenyan Defence Forces conducted five joint training exercises from BATUK, involving around 600 Kenyan troops and 4,500 British troops.

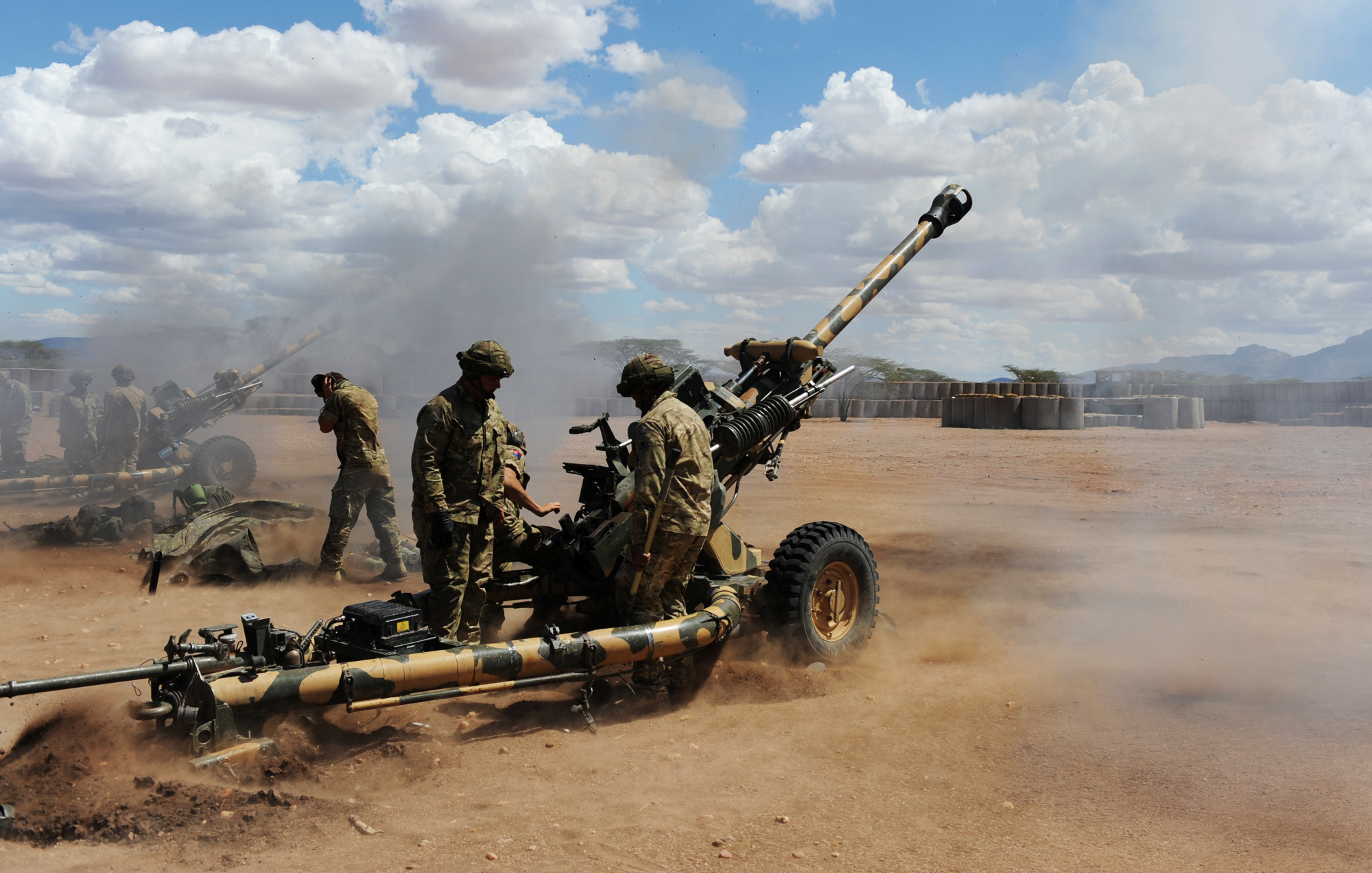
The 4th Battalion The Rifles in Kenya undergoing intensive training to be the British Army's next Spearhead Lead Element - a rapid response force.

In July 2026, the UK MOD cancelled planned six week long training exercise Haraka Storm after the Kenyan government delayed in issuing the necessary licences.

=== Exercise Askari Storm ===
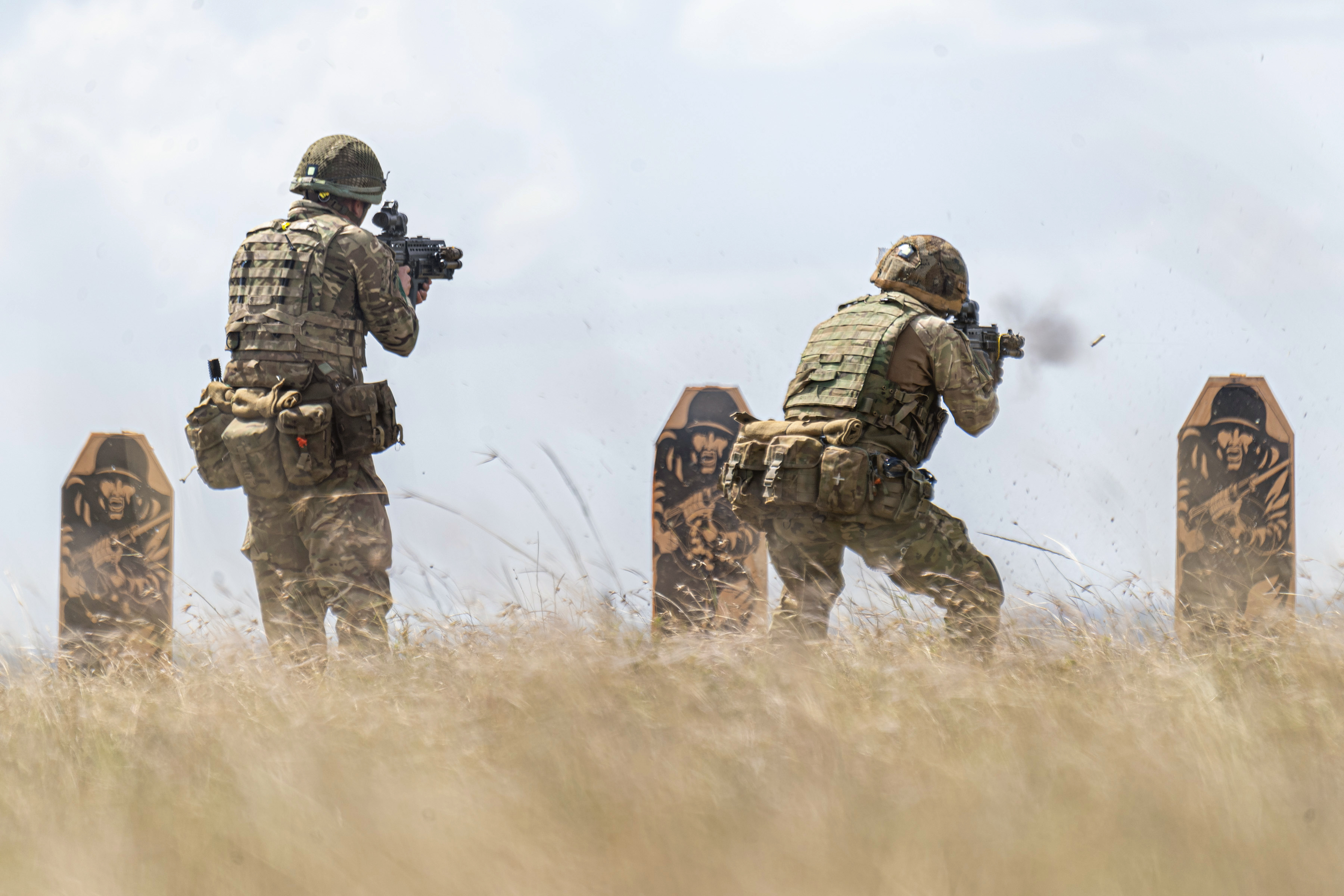
Soldiers from the 3rd Battalion, Parachute Regiment training during Exercise Askari Storm.

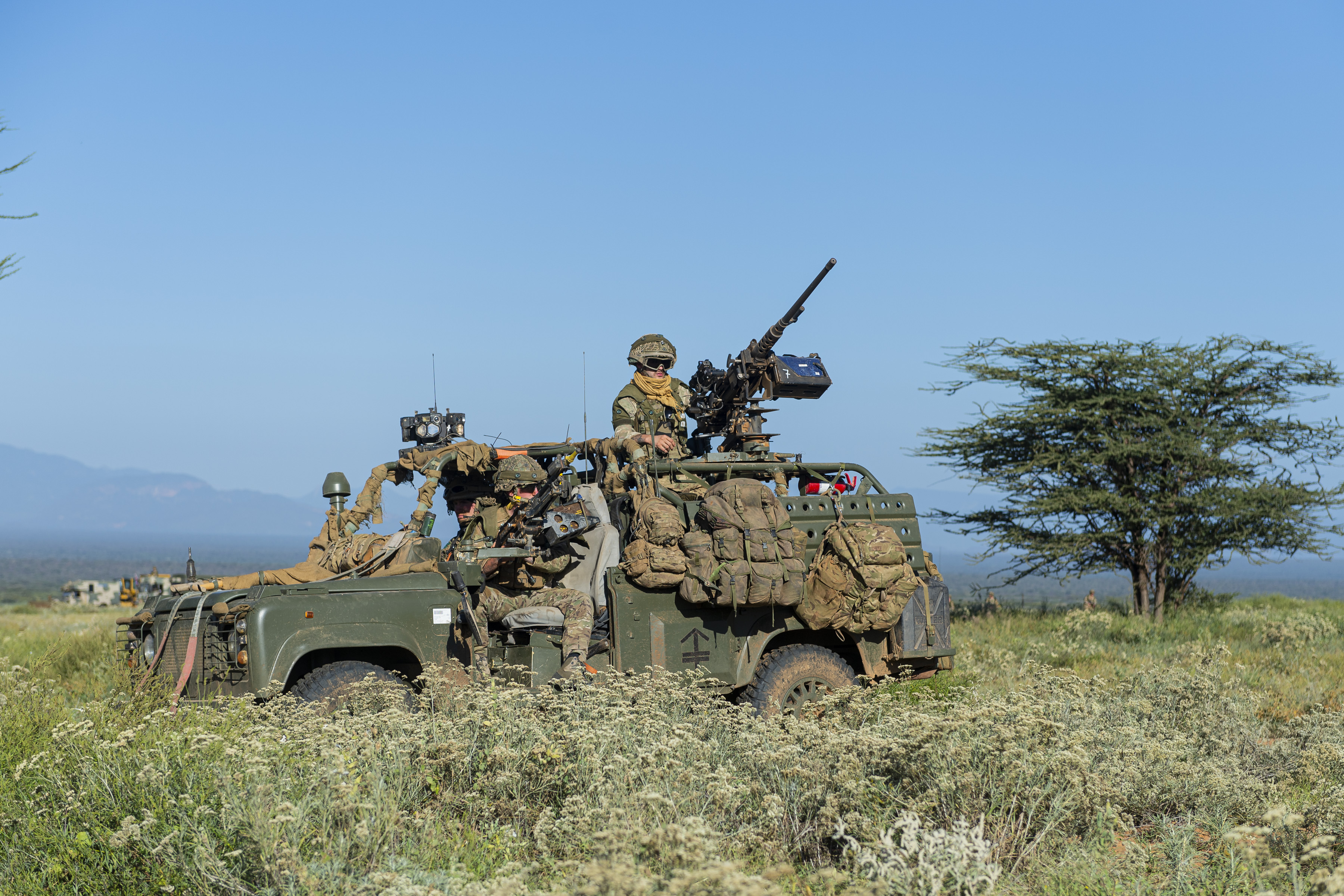
Troops from 3 PARA Battle Group in an RWMIK during Exercise Askari Storm.

Units such as 2nd Battalion The Rifles, 1st Battalion Duke of Lancaster's Regiment, 2nd Battalion & 3rd Battalion Parachute Regiment have all taken part in the exercise in recent years.

As part of Exercise Askari Storm in 2020, troops from 16 Air Assault Brigade practised moving 400 people away from danger. During the exercise, troops rehearsed the vital skills needed to move endangered people out of the way of disease, a natural disaster or conflict. An assault force from 3rd Battalion, Parachute Regiment parachuted in to secure an airfield, with additional troops and vehicles following on. Soldiers fanned out across the countryside to protect citizens from the UK and allied countries, bringing them back to the airstrip for food, shelter and medical care, before being flown out to safety.

=== Anti poaching ===
The British Army is taking a key role against the illegal wildlife trade killing rhinos and elephants in Africa.

Since 2013, British soldiers have joined forces with Kenyan anti-poaching groups in an effort to crack down on illegal wildlife crime. British Army paratroopers have previously provided patrolling and field training to members of the Kenyan Wildlife Service (KWS), Kenyan Forestry Service (KFS), and Mount Kenya Trust (MKT).

In 2013, the British Secretary of State for the Environment, Owen Paterson, announced that the British High Commission, through its Criminal Justice Advisor, had been working with the Office of the Director of Public Prosecutions and others, leading to the setting up of Kenya's Wildlife Crime Taskforce.

=== Infrastructure improvements ===
For a number of years, HQ BATUK was located on land leased from the Nanyuki Agricultural Society, which had to be vacated every year to make way for an agricultural show.

In November 2012, 77 Armoured Engineer Squadron, Royal Engineers (RE) and 66 Works Group, RE were working together to build a new headquarters for BATUK and other British Army elements at the former Second World War RAF Station Nanyuki (renamed Laikipia circa 1982). Over 700 local Kenyan workers and supply chains were employed. The new installation was built on Laikipia Air Base (East), and then later named Nyati Barracks.

In 2015, the BATUK Infrastructure Development Programme began to improve the infrastructure of BATUK.

As part of the programme, the new Nyati Barracks was opened in January 2021, located in Nanyuki, to replace previous infrastructure and provide a training headquarters, welfare facilities, accommodation, mess, offices, stores, and exercise buildings.

The programme provided approximately 400 jobs for Locally Employed Civilians (LECs) and local contractors and included around 30 women working in traditionally male dominated trades, including electrical and plastering work.

== British Army installations in Kenya ==
Name	Part of	Country	County	Opened	Description
Archer's Post Training Area	British Army Training Unit Kenya	Kenya	Samburu County		A large 250,000 hectare training area, capable of Live Fire Tactical Training, including artillery, mortars and armoured vehicles. Previously used on occasion as a camp area for East African Engineers and other troops since at least 1940 (see page 10). 2nd Battalion, Scots Guards was using Archer's Post during the time it was at Kahawa Barracks, Kenya Colony, with 24th Infantry Brigade, 1962–64.
Dol Dol Training Area	British Army Training Unit Kenya	Kenya	Laikipia County		
Nyati Barracks	British Army Training Unit Kenya	Kenya	Laikipia County	2021	Training headquarters, welfare facilities, 158 Single Living Accommodation and 1,400 transit accommodation bed spaces, a combined mess, a finance building, offices, stores and Joint Forces Enabling Exercise buildings.
Kahawa Barracks	British Army Training Unit Kenya	Kenya	Nairobi		BATUK rear area base and depot.
Kifaru Barracks	British Army Training Unit Kenya	Kenya	Nairobi		BATUK rear area base and depot.

The International Peace Support Training Centre (IPSTC) is an associated multinational organisation located in Nairobi County, with inputs from numerous allies. Britain funds around 30% of the training courses that run at the IPSTC, including improvised explosive device disposal.

== Target of crime ==
BATUK has also been a major target for theft and break-ins from the local Kenyan population; in 2016, it was reported that an SA80 assault rifle had been stolen from British soldiers on exercise and used to murder a Kenyan police chief. The weapon was reported missing a month before the murder and a Kenya Police Service investigation found the weapon had been used in the shooting incident.

In 2021, a representative of BATUK revealed that the Kenyan Police were investigating the theft of two British Army Land Rovers, and associated equipment, including tyres, worth millions of pounds, from the BATUK base at Nanyuki.

Three Kenyan men were arrested for allegedly trying to break into the base in 2020, Kenyan police said the three suspects were spotted on CCTV attempting to forcedly enter the base, hours after the attack on a US Army base in Kenya by al-Shabaab militants which killed 3 Americans.

== Crimes and injuries ==
British soldiers serving in Kenya have been involved in criminal acts. Allegations have included alleged murder, child kidnapping, and environmental damage.

No British personnel have ever been charged or convicted, and some diplomatic disputes have arisen as a result.

In September 2015, talks between former British Prime Minister David Cameron and former Kenyan President Uhuru Kenyatta resulted in an agreement which clarified that British soldiers would be tried in Kenya, but not necessarily to Kenyan law, and that British military sites would be subject to Kenyan inspection. Additionally, increased training opportunities were to be offered to Kenyan troops.

=== 2013 killing of armed Kenyan intruder ===
In 2013, a British Army sergeant fatally shot an armed Kenyan man named Tilam Leresh, after believing he was intruding and preparing to commit theft. This escalated an ongoing dispute which centred around Kenyan jurisdiction over British personnel and whether or not they should be tried in Kenya for any violations of Kenyan law. The sergeant was confined to barracks for seven months whilst an investigation was underway, before being removed from the country.

A similar incident occurred in 2011 but did not result in a fatality.

=== Fire at Lolldaiga ===
In March 2021, a fire was reported at the Lolldaiga Conservancy in Nanyuki. The fire, which was allegedly caused by a military exercise by the 2nd Battalion, Mercian Regiment, gained public attention after a British soldier in Kenya allegedly posted on Snapchat during the incident: “Two months in Kenya later and we've only got eight days left. Been good, caused a fire, killed an elephant and feel terrible about it but hey-ho, when in Rome." However, the Kenya Wildlife Service said no elephants had actually died.

The fire burned down 12,000 acres (nearly 50 square kilometres) of land in central Kenya.

Three helicopters, a crop-sprayer aircraft and four water tanker trucks from BATUK assisted in helping put out the fire. The exercise was paused, while all British personnel worked to fight the blaze. The British Army said 350 British and Kenyan troops had been deployed to stop the fire in Lolldaiga.

The UK High Commissioner in Nairobi Jane Marriott said:

“Accidents do happen. It’s not great and we’re really sorry and we really wish it hadn’t happened…We’re doing everything we can to mitigate those circumstances and put in place measures to ensure it never happens again.”

=== Murder of Agnes Wanjiru ===
In October 2021, a report in the Sunday Times alleged that a soldier attached to the Duke of Lancasters Regiment, stabbed and dumped the body of Agnes Wanjiru in a septic tank. According to the report, Agnes Wanjiru, aged 21, was a hairdresser who had "recently turned to sex work", when she was last seen in the company of two British soldiers at the Lions Court Hotel in Nanyuki. A legal inquest in 2019 by Njeri Thuku, principal magistrate for Nanyuki Law Court, stated, "After the conclusion of the inquest, I have formed the opinion that Agnes was murdered by British soldiers". Magistrate Njeri Thuku further wrote, "It may have been one or two. But what is certain was that it was British soldiers because they were dressed in their uniform. She went missing on March 31, 2012, and it is probable she died that night."

=== May 2025 incident ===
Another incident involving an alleged rape was reported to have occurred in May 2025. A soldier was arrested for this incident in June 2025.

== Unexploded ordnance ==
Kenyan civilians have been maimed or killed by unexploded ordnance (UXO) from British army exercises. All exercises are carried out with the agreement of the Kenyan authorities. Land used for exercises is routinely searched on completion of training to make it safe.

The British government has contended that civilian injuries only occur when civilians illegally encroach onto the marked training areas. Unexploded ordnance may also be left by the Kenyan Army which shares the training areas.

=== Death of Jaffer Mohamed ===
In June 1985, BATUK returned a scrap vehicle to Kenyan mechanic, Jaffer Mohamed, in Nanyuki. Although the vehicle had been used for target practice at Mpala ranch, Mohamed was not told it contained UXO. Britain's high commissioner, Leonard Allinson, said Mohamed was "hammering a discarded mortar fuse, part of a scrap consignment" when it exploded. Mohamed left behind a wife and four children.

=== Class action settlements ===
In 2002, the UK Ministry of Defence agreed to pay £4.5m in compensation to 228 Kenyan civilians injured or bereaved by UXO. A further payout for more than a thousand claimants was authorised in 2004.

=== Death of Robert Swara Seurei ===
In 2007, Robert Swara Seurei died after igniting a piece of plastic explosive. Seurei had been hired by BATUK to clear debris from an exercise, where he found the device. He believed it was a candle and lit it at home, resulting in tragedy.

UK defence minister James Heappey said there were "a number of contributing factors" to his death. He said: "Mr Seurei had not understood the safety briefings and the dangers of removing items from the range (due to language barriers); inadequate supervision; premature removal of safety posts marking the hazardous area (before a thorough daylight check had taken place); and incorrect fitting of a safety fuse, which meant that the explosive did not ignite as intended during the exercise."

=== Injury in Samburu ===
In November 2015, a 10-year-old boy in Samburu was injured by UK ordnance.

An MOD spokesperson said:

"[T]roops from the British Army Training Unit Kenya administered life-saving first aid to the child. The boy was airlifted between the two hospitals he was treated at by British troops, which was at the consent of the Head Doctor and the boy’s father. The unit is fully supporting investigations into what happened."

Allegations by Kenyan Members of Parliament that the boy was abducted by British troops seeking to cover up what had happened were firmly rejected by the spokesman, who called them "wildly untrue, inaccurate and complete nonsense."

=== Maiming of Lisoka Lesasuyan ===
In 2015, a 13-year-old Samburu boy, Lisoka Lesasuyan, lost both arms and an eye after picking up a mortar fuze near Archers Post. BATUK agreed to pay compensation to the boy's father. The type of fuze involved in the incident was withdrawn from British army service in 2019. It contained an explosive which the UK Ministry of Defence had known to be unstable since 2009. In 2021, another 13-year-old boy received burns from a flare dropped at Archers Post training area.

== Kenyan parliamentary report ==
In December 2015, a new Kenyan parliamentary report accused British troops training in the country of widespread killings, sexual abuse, and human rights and environmental violations, saying years of misconduct had led locals to view them as an "occupying force." Despite BATUK's long-standing presence and economic contributions, communities reported injuries from mishandled explosives, abuses against women, and abandoned children. After years without accountability, Kenya had amended its defence pact in 2024 to allow local prosecutions, and in 2025 the UK agreed to a £2.9m settlement for thousands of claimants. It was reported that the UK had also begun supporting restoration efforts in areas damaged by military exercises.

== See also ==
- British soldiers and allegations of sexual exploitation in Kenya
