= Orders, decorations, and medals of Kenya =

Orders, decorations, and medals of Kenya are awarded by the President of Kenya "in recognition of outstanding or distinguished services rendered to the nation in various capacities and responsibilities". Awards are made by the president upon the advice of a National Honours and Awards Committee in the president's office. Individuals are nominated for awards by district committees, government ministries, religious organisations, non-governmental organisations, individuals and others. The Chief of the Order of the Golden Heart is the highest honour awarded by the Kenyan government.

== Awards ==
- Order of the Golden Heart

- 1st Class – Chief of the Order of the Golden Heart (C.G.H.)
- 2nd Class – Elder of the Order of the Golden Heart (E.G.H.)
- 3rd Class – Moran of the Order of the Golden Heart (M.G.H.)

- Uhodari Medal
- Order of the Burning Spear

- 1st Class – Chief of the Order of the Burning Spear (C.B.S.)
- 2nd Class – Elder of the Order of the Burning Spear (E.B.S.)
- 3rd Class – Moran of the Order of the Burning Spear (M.B.S.)

- Order of the Grand Warrior The Order of the Grand Warrior (O.G.W) is an award presented to individuals in recognition of an outstanding service rendered to the country in different responsibilities and capacities. More importantly, it is an award presented to those who put their lives at risk to save their fellow countrymen. The recipients of the O.G.W are those who leave a lasting image on their fellow countrymen by putting their country first before their personal feelings and interests. Among the notable recipients of this award include Former Senate Speaker, Hon. David Ekwee Ethuro, former speaker of the National Assembly, Hon. Justin Bedan Muturi, former leader of the majority party in the Senate, the current deputy president of Kenya, Hon. Prof. Kithure Kindiki, and the Cabinet Secretary for Environment Hon. Adan Duale. Another notable figure to receive this award is Salah Farah, a Kenyan Muslim who shielded Christians during an Al-Shabaab ambush in Mandera town in Kenya.
- Distinguished Conduct Order
- Distinguished Service Medal
- Silver Star
- Uzalendo Award
- Head of State's Commendation (H.S.C.)

- Military Division
- Civilian Division

== Notable recipients ==
=== Chief of the Order of the Golden Heart (C.G.H) ===
The President of Kenya holds the position of Chief of the Order of the Golden Heart of Kenya. The incumbent is William Samoei Ruto.

The Chief of the Order of the Golden Heart of Kenya is the highest honour in Kenya, and as of 2009 the award has been bestowed on 16 people since Kenyan independence. Recipients of this award include Yoweri Museveni the President of Uganda, Reimond Kipkesio and Syedna Mufaddal Saifuddin, 53rd Dai al-Mutlaq of the Dawoodi Bohra community., former prime minister of Kenya Raila Amollo Odinga.

=== Elder of the Order of the Golden Heart (E.G.H) ===
The Elder of the Order of the Golden Heart (E.G.H.) is the second highest honour awarded by the republic of Kenyan government.

On 20 April 2017, President Uhuru Kenyatta awarded the Elder of the Order of the Golden Heart to His Holiness Syedna Mufaddal Saifuddin, at the inauguration of Aljamea-tus-Saifiyah in Nairobi.

On 20 October 2019, President Kenyatta awarded the Elder of the Order of the Golden Heart of Kenya to Eliud Kipchoge for running a sub two-hour marathon in Vienna, Austria.

=== Order of the Grand Warrior ===
Salah Farah received the award for dying trying to fend off a terrorist attack. The Kenyan President, Uhuru Kenyatta, said Farah "...is a costly reminder that we all have a role to protecting our freedoms."

Technology entrepreneur Njeri Rionge received the award for her contribution in entrepreneurship and women's empowerment.

== Bars ==
Ribbon bars
Order of the Golden Heart	Order of the Burning Spear	Order of the Grand Warrior	Distinguished Service Medal	Silver Star of Kenya
