= Order of the Golden Heart (Kenya) =

Highest award in Kenya

Awarded by the President
- Type: State
- Established: 1966; 60 years ago
- Country: Kenya
- Awarded for: displays of exemplary qualities, achievements of heroism, patriotism or leadership
- Classes: Chief: Elder; Moran
- Post-nominals: CGH; EGH; MGH

Precedence
- Next (higher): None (highest)
- Next (lower): Order of the Burning Spear

Order of the Golden Heart of the Republic of Kenya is the highest award in Kenya, and is split into three classes: Chief of the Order of the Golden Heart (C.G.H.), Elder of the Order of the Golden Heart (E.G.H.) and Moran of the Order of the Golden Heart (M.G.H.)

== Recipients ==
Chief of the Order is mostly given to the holders of the office of the President of Kenya. However, several prominent figures have also received the medal despite not being Kenyan sitting presidents. Recipients include:

- Rt. Honourable Raila Amolo Odinga, The Second Prime Minister of Kenya
- President of Uganda Yoweri Museveni
- Former President of Liberia Ellen Johnson Sirleaf
- Aga Khan IV
- Aga Khan V
- President of the African Development Bank Akinwumi Adesina
- Saudi Businessman Prince Al Waleed bin Talal Al Saud
- Former Prime Minister of New Zealand Mike Moore
- Syedna Mufaddal Saifuddin, 53rd Da'i al-Mutlaq of the Dawoodi Bohra

== See also ==
- Orders, decorations, and medals of Kenya
