= Kenya Defence Forces =

Armed forces of Kenya

- Majeshi ya Ulinzi ya Kenya
- Emblem of the Kenya Defence Forces

- Flag of the Kenya Defence Forces
- Founded: 12 December 1963 (62 years, 321 days)
- Service branches: Kenya Army; Kenya Air Force; Kenya Navy
- Website: mod.go.ke

Leadership
- Commander-in-Chief: President William Ruto
- Defence Cabinet Secretary: Soipan Tuya
- Chief of Defence Forces: General Charles Muriu Kahariri
- Vice Chief of Defence Forces: Lt. Gen. John Mugaravai Omenda

Personnel
- Military age: 18
- Conscription: None
- Active personnel: 50,000

Expenditure
- Budget: see IISS Military Balance

Industry
- Domestic suppliers: Kenya Ordnance Factories Corporation; National Security Industries Ruiru
- Foreign suppliers: Pakistan; India; Uganda; China; Turkey; United Kingdom; United States

Related articles
- History: Second World War (as King's African Rifles) (1939–45); Malayan Emergency (1948–60); Mau Mau Revolt (1952–60); After Independence Shifta War (1963–67); Mount Elgon insurgency (2005–08); Operation Linda Nchi (2011–12); War in Somalia (2012–present); Kivu conflict (2022–present)
- Ranks: Military ranks of Kenya

The Kenya Defence Forces (KDF) (Swahili: Majeshi ya Ulinzi ya Kenya, stylised as "KENYA ARMED FORCES" capitalised on its coat of arms) are the armed forces of the Republic of Kenya. They are made up of the Kenya Army, Kenya Navy, and Kenya Air Force. The current KDF was established, and its composition stipulated, in Article 241 of the 2010 Constitution of Kenya; it is governed by the KDF Act of 2012. Its main mission is the defence and protection of the sovereignty and territorial integrity of Kenya, recruitment to the KDF is done on yearly basis. The President of Kenya is the commander-in-chief of the KDF, and the Chief of Defence Forces is the highest-ranking military officer, and the principal military adviser to the President of Kenya.

The Defence Forces, like many Kenyan government institutions, has been tainted by corruption. Because the military have been traditionally cloaked by the blanket of "state security", the corruption has been less in public view, and thus less subject to public scrutiny and notoriety. But in 2010, credible claims of corruption were made with regard to recruitment, and procurement of Armoured Personnel Carriers. The decision on the Northrop F-5 "Tiger" aircraft procurement have been publicly questioned. In 2015, credible allegations were made that the KDF is involved with sugar smuggling from southern Somalia into Kenya, to avoid import dues.

The KDF is regularly deployed in peacekeeping and warfighting missions, for example the counter-insurgency fight against al-Shabaab in Somalia since 2011.

== History ==
The United Kingdom raised and maintained forces in Kenya Colony after it was established, eventually to become the King's African Rifles (KAR). The KAR fought during the two World Wars and in the Mau Mau Uprising. On the other side of the Mau Mau Uprising was the first Kenyan force raised by African themselves, the Kenya Land and Freedom Army.

=== Jomo Kenyatta Administration ===
Kenya's independence on the midnight of 12 December 1963 was an enormous milestone. On independence, the Kenyan Parliament created the Kenya Military Forces (KMF) through the KMF Act 1963. Thus 3 KAR, 5 KAR, and 11 KAR became 3 Kenya Rifles, 5 Kenya Rifles, and 11 Kenya Rifles respectively. The new independence government retained senior British military officers as advisers and trainers to the new Kenyan army. They stayed on, administering the former KAR units as they developed more Kenyan characteristics. The Kenya Regiment composed of British settlers was disbanded.

Between 1963 and 1967, Kenya fought the Shifta War against Somali residents who sought union with their kin in the Somali Republic to the north-east. In late 1963, 5th Kenya Rifles was sent to the North Eastern Province as a response to the growing number of Shifta ambushes. Also dispatched were additional police and the General Service Unit. The Shifta were lightly loaded and very mobile, and could draw on substantial support from the local Kenyan-Somali population. The army and police forcibly resettled the population into "new villages" and conducted sweeps to destroy the Shifta beyond, including making mortar attacks on assumed Shifta positions.

On the evening of 24 January 1964, the failure of the Kenyan Prime Minister to appear on television, where 11th Kenya Rifles junior soldiers had been expecting a televised speech and hoping for a pay rise announcement, caused the men to mutiny. Parsons says it is possible that the speech was only broadcast on the radio in the Nakuru area where Lanet Barracks, home of the battalion, was located. Kenyatta's government held two separate courts-martial for 43 soldiers.

In the aftermath of the mutiny and following courts-martial, the 11th Kenya Rifles was disbanded. A new battalion, 1st Kenya Rifles, was created entirely from 340 Lanet soldiers who had been cleared of participation in the mutiny by the Kenyan Criminal Investigations Division (CID). Hornsby writes that after the mutiny, '[Kenyatta] improved conditions, announced pay rises to the military, speeded Africanisation, and instructed the intelligence services to infiltrate and watch the army for signs of disaffection.'

Discussions began in March 1964 between Kenya and Secretary of State for Commonwealth Relations Duncan Sandys on defence, and a formal agreement was signed on 3 June 1964. All British troops would leave by 12 December 1964, the British would assist the army, resource and train a new Kenya Air Force, and create a new Kenya Navy. They would also provide RAF and Army units to support internal security in the north-east. Significant military loans would be cancelled, and much military property made over to the Kenyan Government. In return, British aircraft would be able to transit through Kenya, RN ships of the Far East Fleet and other units could visit Mombasa, communications facilities could be used until 1966, and troops could exercise in Kenya twice a year. Army training deployments have continued up until 2015, as of 2015 supervised by British Army Training Unit Kenya.

Timothy Parsons wrote in 2002–03:

'..Kenyatta did not have to worry about the political reliability of the Kenyan Army because expatriate senior British military advisors ran it along KAR lines throughout the 1960s. Following the lessons of the Lanet protects, African officers assumed operational command of all major units, but a British training team still oversaw the Kenyan Army for most of the decade. More significantly, an informal defence arrangement with Britain reassured Kenyatta that he could rely on direct British military support in the event of an army mutiny or attempted coup.'

Within months of British Brigadier A.J. Hardy leaving the post of Commander Kenya Army and handing over to Brigadier Joseph Ndolo on 1 December 1966, British influence was underlined with the appointment of Major General Bernard Penfold as Chief of the Defence Staff, a new position as senior officer of the entire armed forces. Ndolo succeeded Penfold as Chief of Defence Staff in 1969, but was retired on 24 June 1971 after being implicated in a coup plot allegedly organised by Joseph Owino. The service chiefs thereafter reported directly to the Minister of Defence, James Gichuru. The post of Chief of the Defence Staff was only filled again seven years later ( renamed the Chief of the General Staff - CGS) when Daniel arap Moi moved Lieutenant General Jackson Mulinge from Army Commander to CGS in November 1978. Mahamoud Mohamed succeeded Mulinge in 1986, and was CGS until 1996. Mohamed was succeeded by General Daudi Tonje, CGS 1996–2000.

Women were first recruited into the armed forces in 1971, with the establishment of the Women's Service Corps. The corps was initially made up of 150 women under Major Patricia Ineson of the British Women's Royal Army Corps, before she was replaced by Phyllis Ikua, formerly of the Kenya Prisons Service. Fatumah Ahmed joined the WSC in 1983.

=== Moi Administration ===
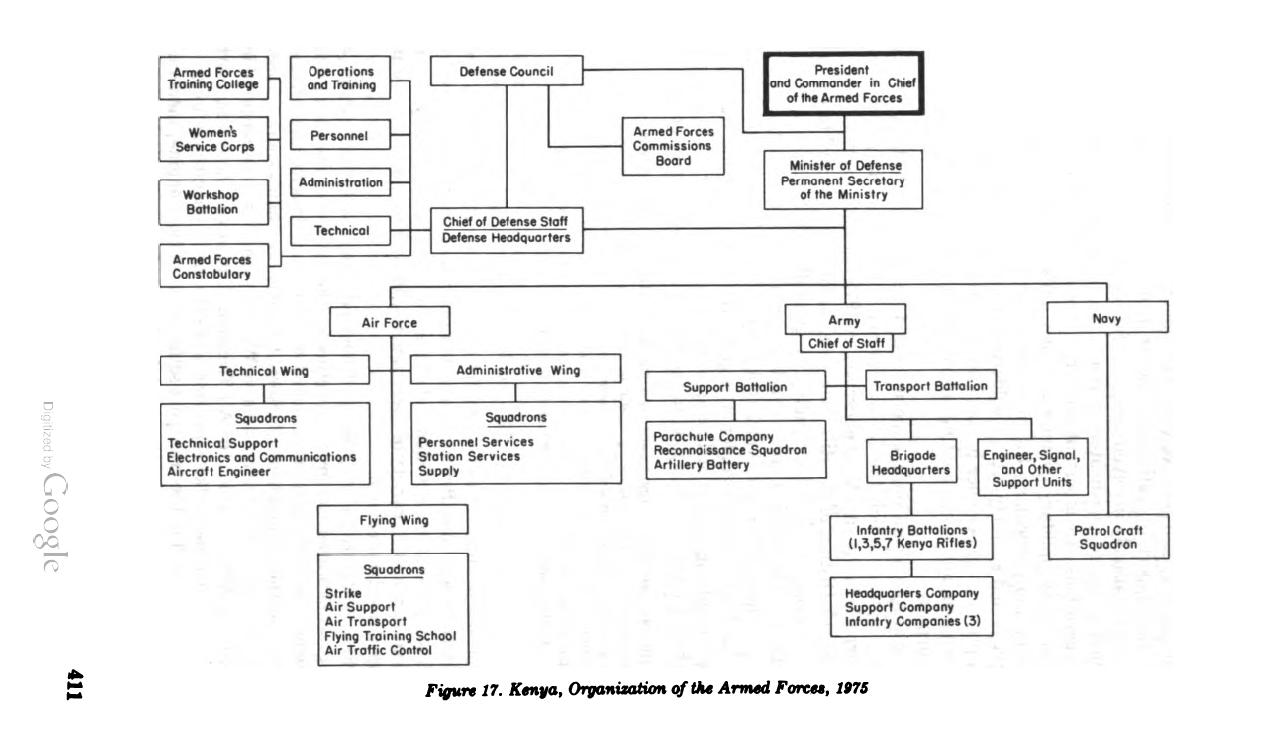
Organisation of the Kenyan Armed Forces, 1975.

The South African Institute for Security Studies wrote when Moi was still in power: "the Kenyan armed forces' reputation as a politically neutral establishment has been undermined by irrefutable evidence of tribal favouritism in the appointment of key posts. In the military (and also the Police and GSU), there is a virtual monopoly of President Moi's ethnic group, the Kalenjin, in the top brass. Of 18 military generals, at least a third are Kalenjin; of 20 brigadiers, 7 are Kalenjin—an ethnic group that accounts for only a tenth of Kenya's population. This obviously works to the disadvantage, especially, of the Kikuyu and the Luo."

From the 1990s the Kenya Army became involved in United Nations peacekeeping operations, which, Hornsby says, 'offered both experience and a source of income for the army and its soldiers.' (The United Nations reimburses troop contributing countries for each soldier contributed.) Kenya's first peacekeeping deployment was to the United Nations Iran–Iraq Military Observer Group to supervise the ceasefire; then UNTAG in Namibia. From 1989 to 2001, Kenyan troops took part in UNTAG, UNOSOM, UNPROFOR, UNCRO (Croatia), UNTAES, UNOMIL, UNPREDEP in Macedonia (1996–1999), MONUA in Angola (1997–1999), and UNTAET in East Timor (1999–2001). In 1999–2000, women were integrated into the regular units of the military, and the Women's Service Corps disbanded.

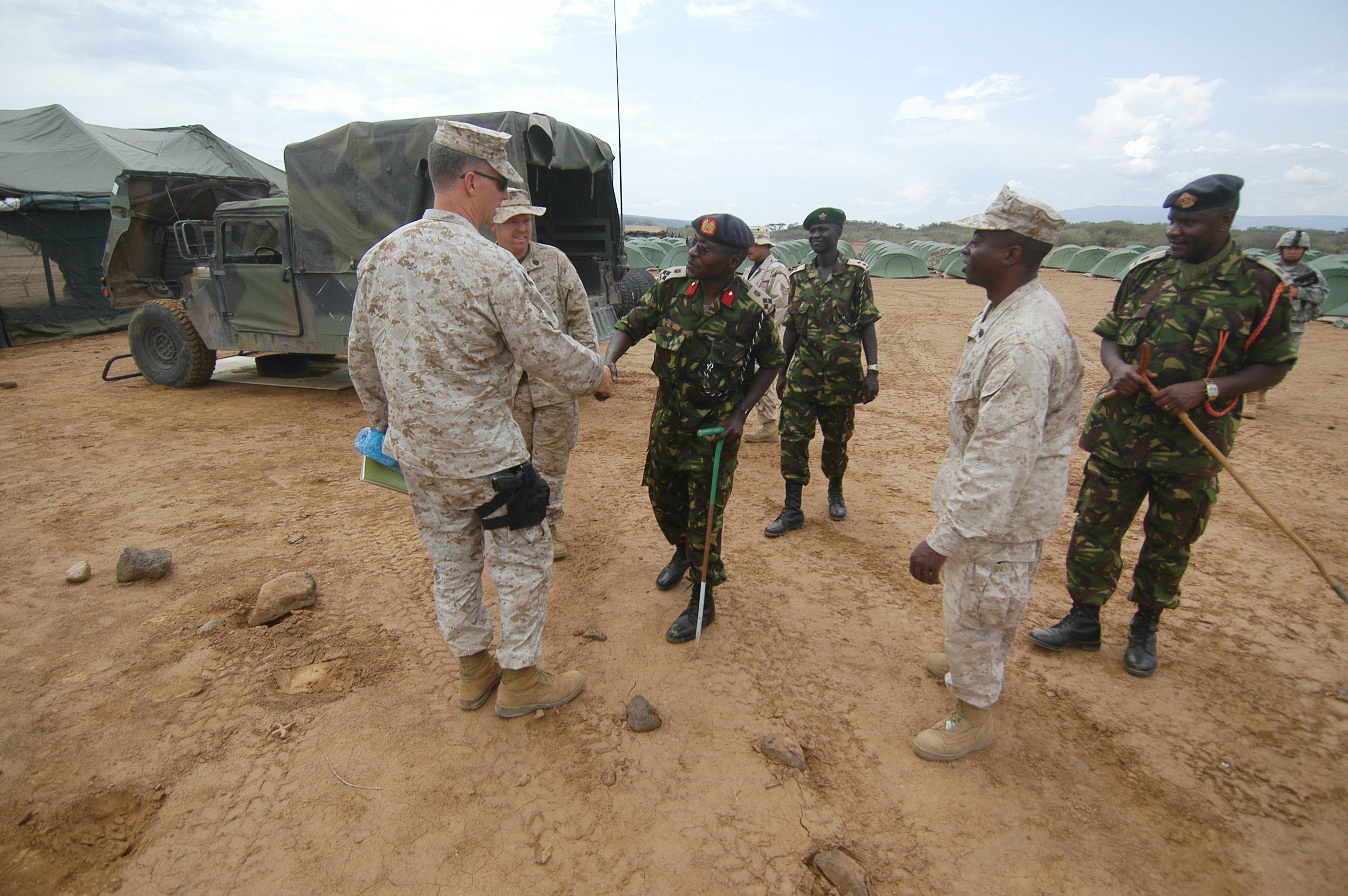
Kenyan Army Brig. Gen. Leonard Ngondi, Natural Fire Commanding Officer, left, greets U.S. Marine Lt. Col. Steve Nichols, left, at Camp Lonestar in Kenya, 2006.

In the early 21st century, the Ministry of State for Defence, just like that of Internal Security and Provincial Administration, is part of the presidential machinery. All but senior military officers are appointed, promoted, and, if necessary, removed by the military's personnel system. The president appoints and retires senior military officers. Under the authority of the president as Commander-in-Chief, the Minister of Defence presides over the National Defence Council. The Chief of General Staff is the tactical, operational and administrative head of the military. Under the 2010 constitution, the defence forces can no longer be deployed for combat operations within Kenya without the approval of Parliament.

=== Kibaki Administration ===
In the aftermath of the national elections of December 2007 and the violence that subsequently engulfed the country, a commission of inquiry, the Waki Commission, commended its readiness and adjudged it to "have performed its duty well." Nevertheless, there have been serious allegations of human rights violations, most recently while conducting counter-insurgency operations in the Mt Elgon area and also in the district of Mandera central.

In October 2011, following a weekend preparatory meeting between Kenyan and Somali military officials in the town of Dhobley, Kenya Army units crossed the border to begin Operation Linda Nchi attacking the Al-Shabaab insurgents in southern Somalia. Kenya had coordinated with the transitional government in Mogadishu, and with the Somali militias in the border areas, but the drive on Kismayu was run by the KDF. In early June 2012, Kenyan forces were formally integrated into AMISOM.

As of August 2012 Major General Maurice Oyugi was the army vice commander.

== Service branches ==
The Kenya Defence Forces is composed of the Kenya Army, Kenya Air Force and Kenya Navy.

=== Kenya Army ===
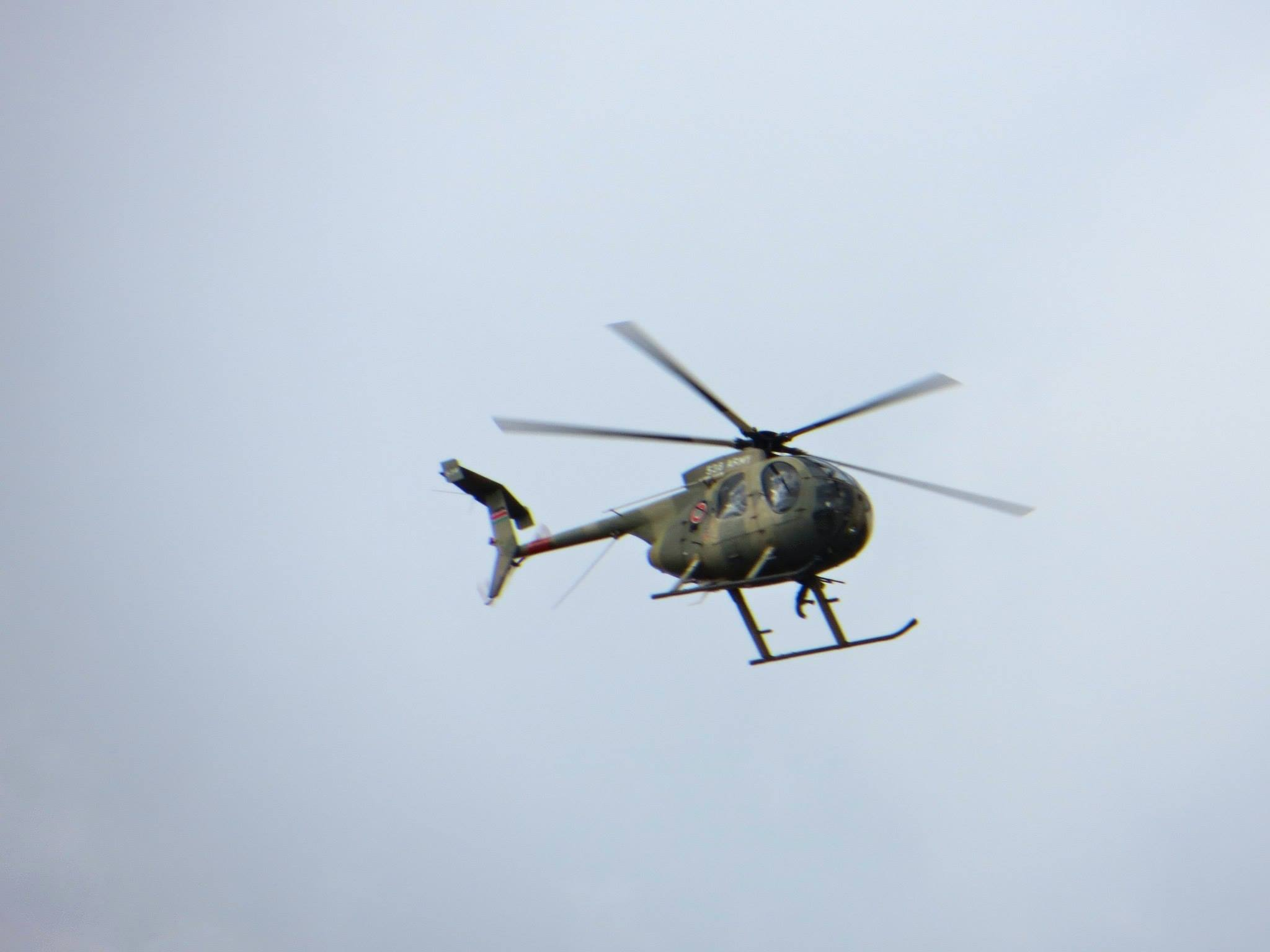
An MD 500 Defender helicopter over the Westgate Shopping Mall during the siege, 2013.

As of 2006, the Kenya Army had five brigades: two infantry, one with three battalions and one with two battalions; the Kenya Army Armoured Brigade with three battalions; the Kenya Army Artillery Brigade with two battalions; and the Engineer Brigade with two battalions. In addition, the army included an air defence artillery, 20 Parachute Battalion, independent infantry, and the independent 50 Air Cavalry Battalion with 35 armed helicopters at Embakasi.

In February 2014, the official Ministry of State for Defence listed the following Army formations and services:

- Kenya Army Infantry
- Kenya Army Paratroopers – Ranger D Company of 20 Parachute Battalion was the first army commando unit trained by the US through Combined Joint Task Force-Horn of Africa (CJTF-HOA) and its predecessors. Main tasks include reconnaissance, raids, ambushes, infiltration and border patrol in joint operations. The unit was deployed for counter-insurgency operations in the Mt Elgon area in 2008 amid accusations of torture and illegal detention.
- Kenya Army Armoured Brigade (includes one armoured reconnaissance battalion (76th), 78 Tank Battalion, Isiolo)
- Kenya Army Artillery Brigade (includes 77 Artillery Battalion, 88 Artillery Battalion. 88 Artillery Battalion was established at Larisoro, Isiolo County, 27 April 2018.)
- Kenya Army Engineers Brigade
- 50 Air Cavalry Battalion
- Kenya Army Ordnance Corps
- Kenya Army Corps of Transport
- Kenya Army Electrical and Mechanical Engineering
- Kenya Army Corps of Signals
- Military Police Corps
- Kenya Army Education Corps
- Medical Battalion
- Defence Forces Constabulary (DFC)

The Kenya Ranger Strike Force initiative began in 2006 with a request from the Ministry of Defence; creation of KRSF highlighted extensively in KMOD White Paper on Military Cooperation for 2011–2016. The total U.S. investment was $40M. Leveraged IMET courses for Ranger and Ranger Instructor courses, Section 1206 funding to secure training and equipment, multiple Joint Combined Exchange and Training (JCET) events, and East African Regional Security Initiative (EARSI now PREACT) to fund training and equipment. The first class taught by all Kenya Army Ranger Instructors graduated on 18 March 2011. Kenya formed a Special Operations Regiment (Kenya) composed of 20th Parachute Battalion, 30th Special Operations Battalion and 40th Kenya Ranger Strike Force Battalion. Kabete Barracks off Waiyaki Way in Nairobi is reported to house forces which are 'special'.

By 2019–2020, the International Institute for Strategic Studies listed the army's formations as including one armoured brigade (one armoured reconnaissance battalion, two armoured battalions); one special operations battalion; one ranger battalion; one infantry brigade with three infantry battalions, and another infantry brigade with two infantry battalions; one independent infantry battalion; one air cavalry battalion [50 Air Cavalry Battalion]; one airborne battalion; one artillery brigade with two artillery battalions and a mortar battery; one air defence battalion; and one engineer brigade with two engineer battalions (IISS MB 2020, p. 483).

=== Kenya Air Force ===
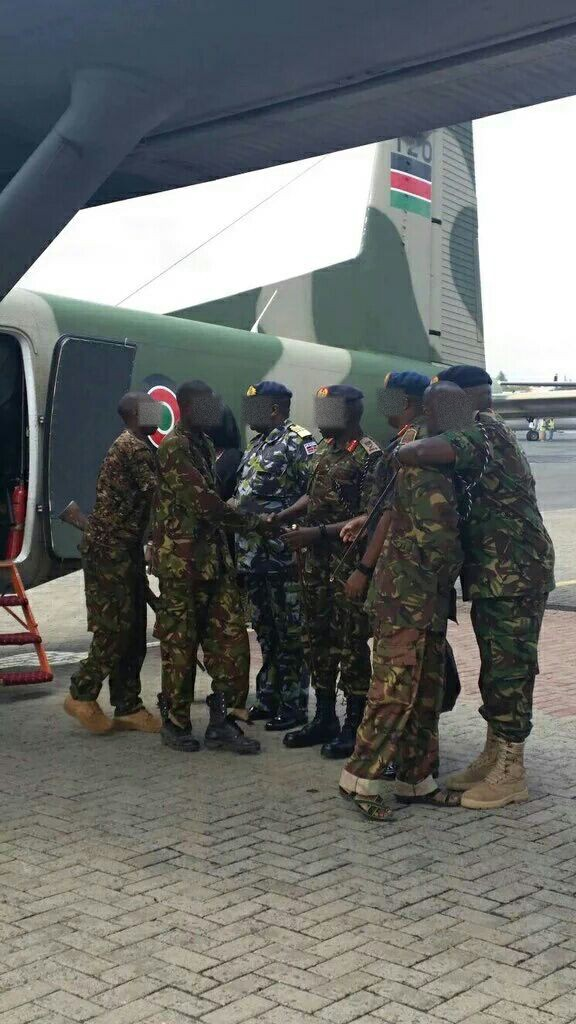
Soldiers near a turboprop utility aircraft of Kenya Air Force

The Kenya Air Force was formed on 1 June 1964, soon after independence, with the assistance of the United Kingdom.

After a failed coup by a group of Air Force officers on 1 August 1982, the Air Force was disbanded. Air Force activity was reconstituted and placed under tighter army control as the 82 Air Force. The Air Force regained its independent status in 1994.

The main airbase operating fighters is Laikipia Air Base in Nanyuki, while Moi Air Base in Eastleigh, Nairobi is the headquarters. Other bases include Wajir Air Base, Forward Operating Base (FOB) Mombasa (Moi International Airport), FOB Mandera, & FOB Nyeri (mainly helicopters/small planes).

=== Kenya Navy ===
The Kenya Navy is the naval branch of the Kenyan Defence Forces. The Navy was established on 12 December 1964, exactly one year after Kenya gained independence. It was preceded by the colonial Royal East African Navy.

The Navy operates several bases, Mtongwe base in Mombasa, Shimoni, Msambweni, Malindi, Kilifi and since 1995 another base located in Manda (part of Lamu Archipelago).

== See also ==
- Kenya Police
- Kenya Coast Guard Service
- Law enforcement in Kenya
