= Walter Raria =

Kenyan general

Walter Koipaton Raria
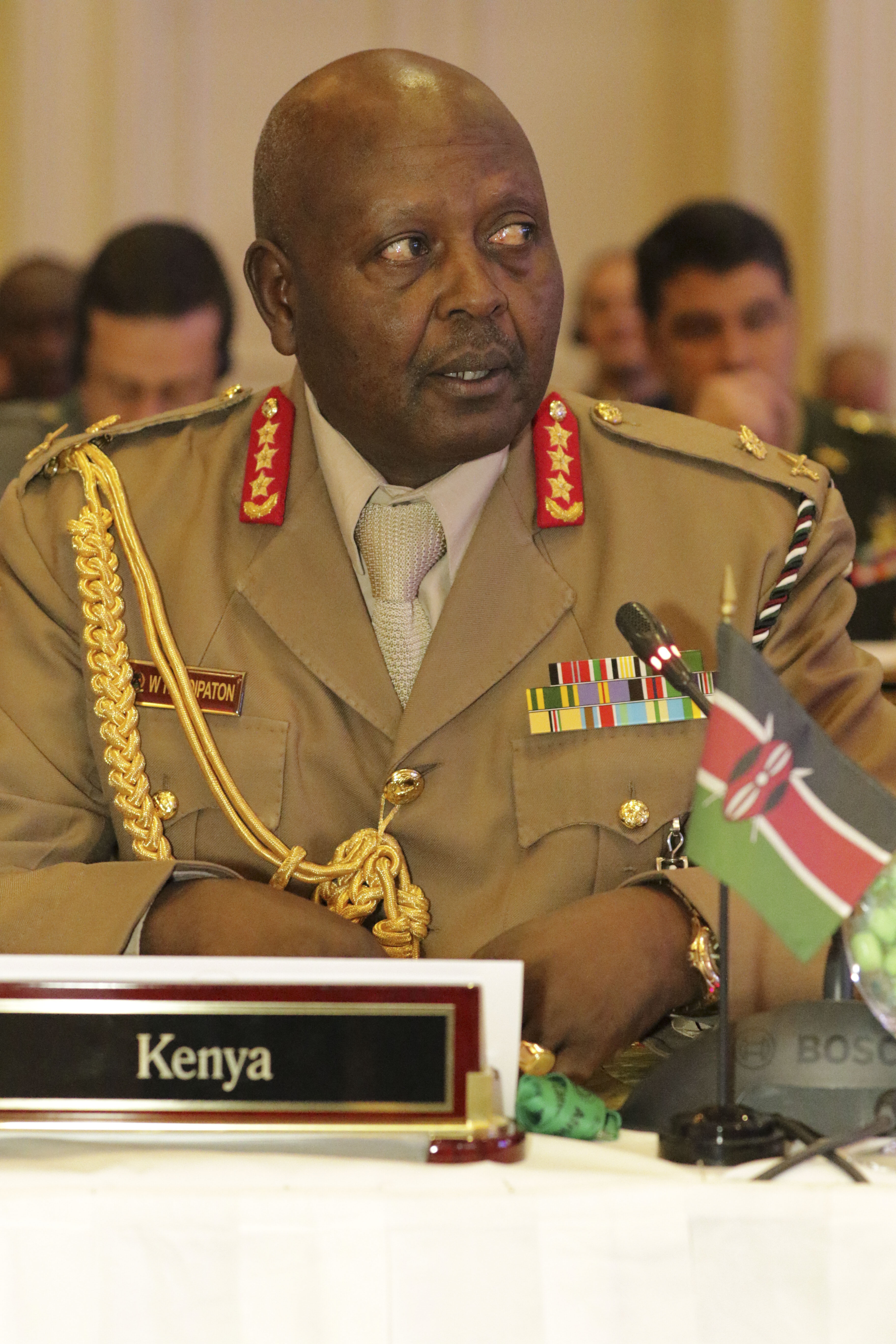
- Raria in 2019
- Born: Kenya
- Branch: Kenya Army
- Rank: Lieutenant General
- Commands: Commander, Kenya Army

Lieutenant General Walter Koipaton Raria is a Kenyan military officer. Between July 2018 and July 2022, he served as the commander, Kenya Army, a service branch of the Kenya Defence Forces (KDF).

== Background ==
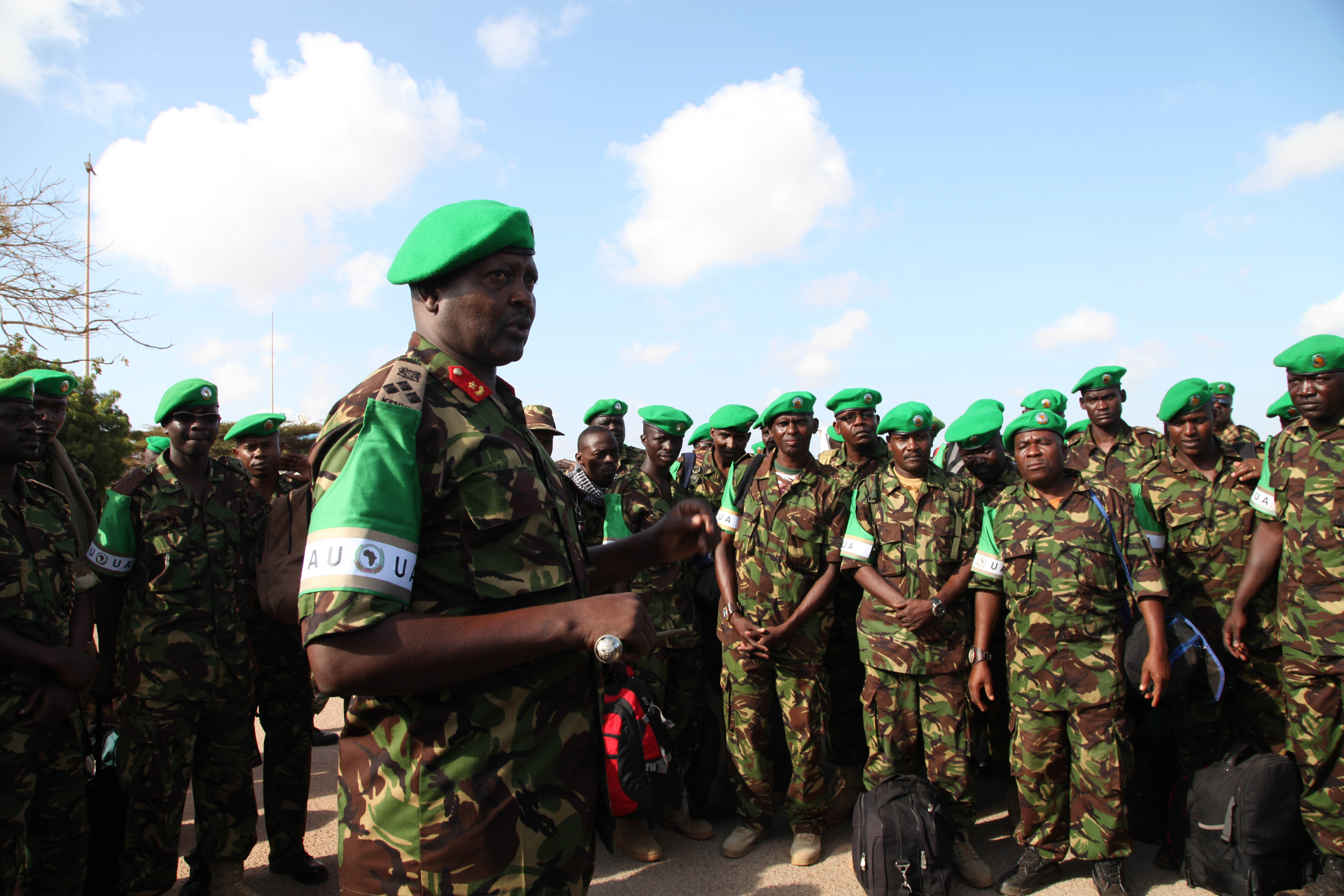
Raria commanding the Kenyan contingent of the AMISOM, 2015

At the time of his appointment to his current assignment, Raria was the deputy commander of the Kenya Army, a position that he had served in for the previous two years. He replaced Lieutenant General Robert Kibochi, who was promoted to the position of vice chief of the Kenya Defence Forces.

== As commander of the Army ==
Raria was sworn in as Army commander on 13 July 2018. He is the 21st commander of the Kenya Army.

In July 2022, Uhuru Kenyatta, the president of Kenya at that time, appointed Lieutenant General Peter Mbogo Njiru as the 22nd commander of the Kenyan Army. The handover ceremony took place at the Department of Defence Headquarters in Nairobi, on 8 August 2022. General Raria retired from the Kenyan military in 2022.

== Succession table ==
Military offices
Preceded by Lieutenant General Robert Kibochi	Commander of Kenya Army; July 2018 - July 2022	Succeeded by Lieutenant General Peter Mbogo Njiru
