= Peter Mbogo Njiru =

Kenyan general

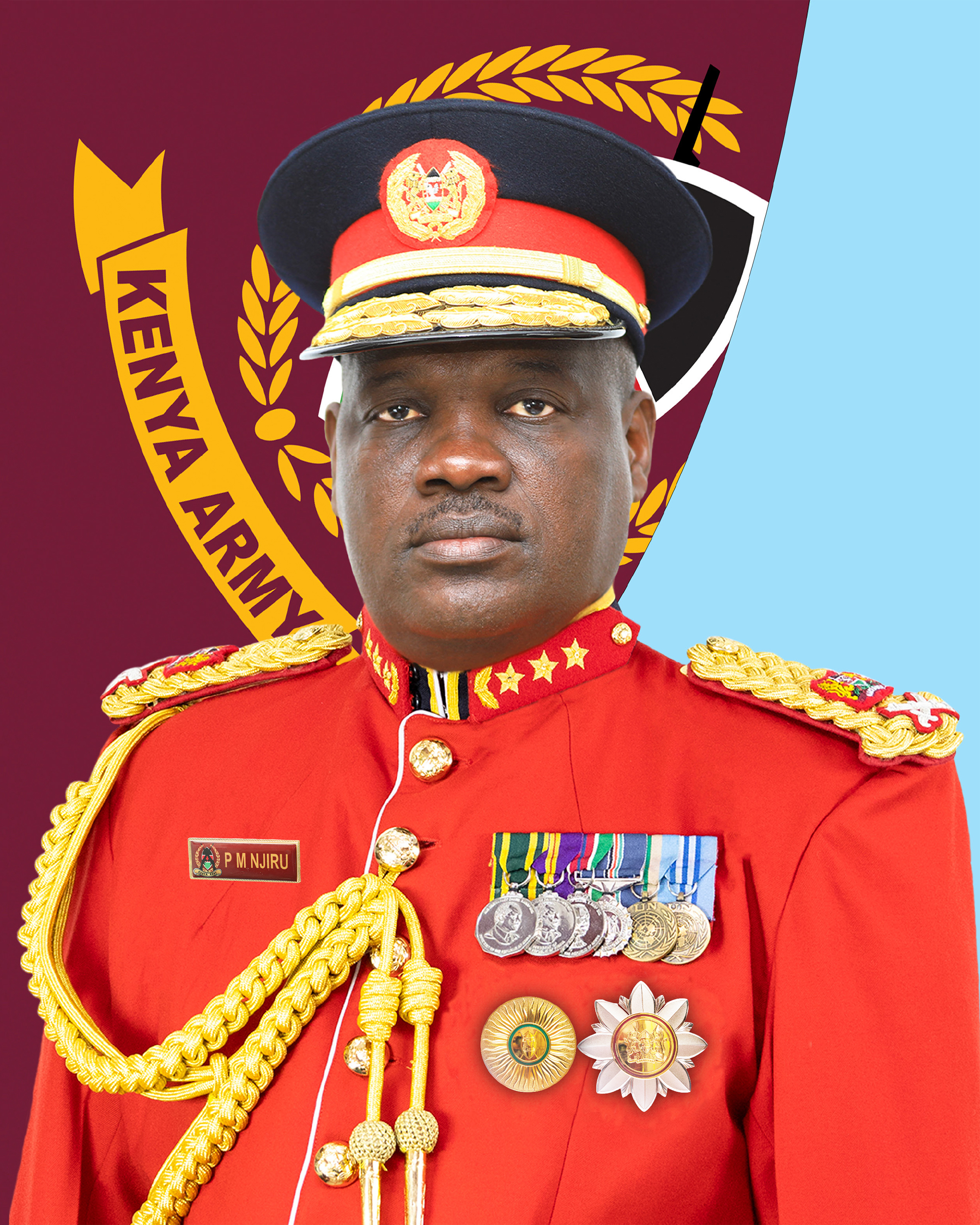
- Born: Kenya
- Branch: Kenya Army
- Rank: Lieutenant General
- Commands: Commander, Kenya Army
- Alma mater: King's College London; Royal College of Defence Studies

Lieutenant General (RTD) Peter Mbogo Njiru was a Kenyan military officer, who served as the commander, Kenya Army, since July 2022. The Kenya Army is a service branch of the Kenya Defence Forces (KDF). Njiru was previously the commander of the Kenya Joint Command and Staff College, at the rank of major general.

== Background and education ==
According to his profile at the Kenya Ministry of Defence, Njiru enlisted in the Kenya Army in June 1985 as an officer cadet. He graduated in June 1986 as a second lieutenant and was posted to an artillery unit, later rising to commanding officer of the unit.

He has studied in many varied military and academic institutions, in Kenya and other countries. He holds a Master of Arts in International Security from King's College London, and has attended the Royal College of Defence Studies Course administered once annually by the Royal College of Defence Studies, in London, United Kingdom. Other courses attended include the Junior Command Course, Grade 2 Staff Course, Peace Support Operations, African Disarmament Course, Joint Senior Command Course, International Battle Group Commanders Course, and Next Generation of Military Leaders Course.

== Career ==
On 20 July 2022, Uhuru Kenyatta, the president of Kenya at that time, appointed Lieutenant General Peter Mbogo Njiru as the 22nd commander of the Kenyan Army. He replaced Lieutenant General Walter Koipaton Raria, who retired from the Kenya military later in 2022. The handover ceremony took place at the Department of Defence Headquarters in Nairobi, on 8 August 2022.

As of July 2022, in his 36 years in the Kenya Defence Forces, he had held many leadership positions in the KDF, including Staff Officer One, responsible for Operations, Plans, Doctrine and Training (OPD&T) at the KDF headquarters, in Nairobi. In addition, he served as the commandant of Recruits Training School, Kenya Military Academy, and Joint Command and Staff College. He also served as aide-de-camp (ADC) to President Uhuru Kenyatta, when he was the commander-in-chief of the KDF.

On 8 March 2024, Njiru completed his tour of duty after 39 years in the military. He was succeeded as Kenya Army commander by Major General David Kimaiyo Tarus.

== Other considerations ==
Njiru was a commanding officer of the Kenyan Battalion as part of the United Nations Mission in South Sudan (UNMISS). He also served as a staff officer in United Nations Mission in Ethiopia and Eritrea (UNMEE). He was awarded the Chief of the Burning Spear (CBS) medal by Uhuru Kenyatta, the president of Kenya and commander-in-chief of the Kenya Defence Forces.

== Personal ==
Njiru is a married father of three children.

== Succession table ==
Military offices
| Preceded by Lieutenant General Walter Raria | Commander of Kenya Army; 20 July 2022 - 08 March 2024 | Succeeded by Major General David Kimaiyo Tarus |
