= Military ranks of Kenya =

The military ranks of Kenya are the military insignia used by the Kenya Defence Forces. Being a former colony of the United Kingdom, Kenya shares a rank structure similar to that of the United Kingdom, especially the British Army.

== Commissioned officer ranks ==
The rank insignia of commissioned officers.

Rank group	General / flag officers					Senior officers			Junior officers
Kenya Army
Kenya Army	Commander-in-Chief	General	Lieutenant general	Major general	Brigadier	Colonel	Lieutenant colonel	Major	Captain	Lieutenant	Second lieutenant
Kenya Navy
Kenya Navy		General	Lieutenant general	Major general	Brigadier	Colonel	Lieutenant colonel	Major	Captain	Lieutenant	Second lieutenant
Kenya Air Force
Kenya Air Force	Commander-in-Chief	General	Lieutenant general	Major general	Brigadier	Colonel	Lieutenant colonel	Major	Captain	Lieutenant	Second lieutenant
Rank group	General / flag officers					Senior officers			Junior officers

== Other ranks ==
The rank insignia of non-commissioned officers and enlisted personnel.

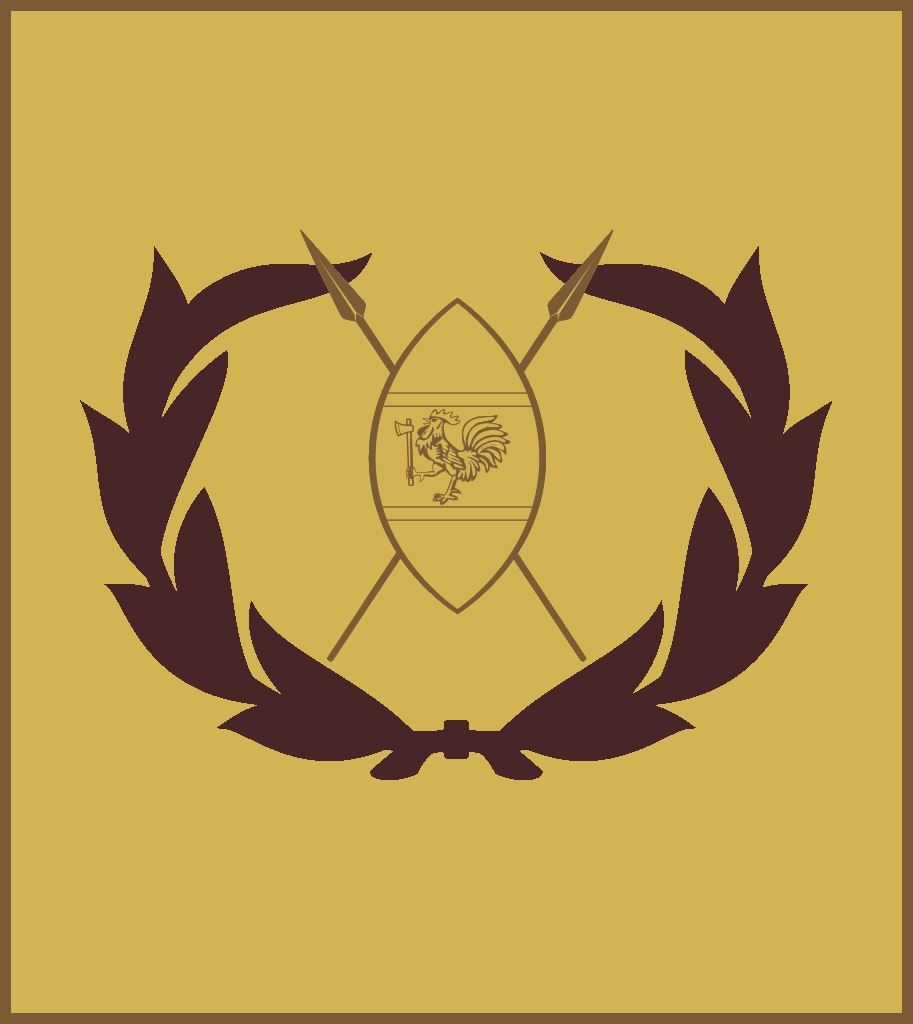
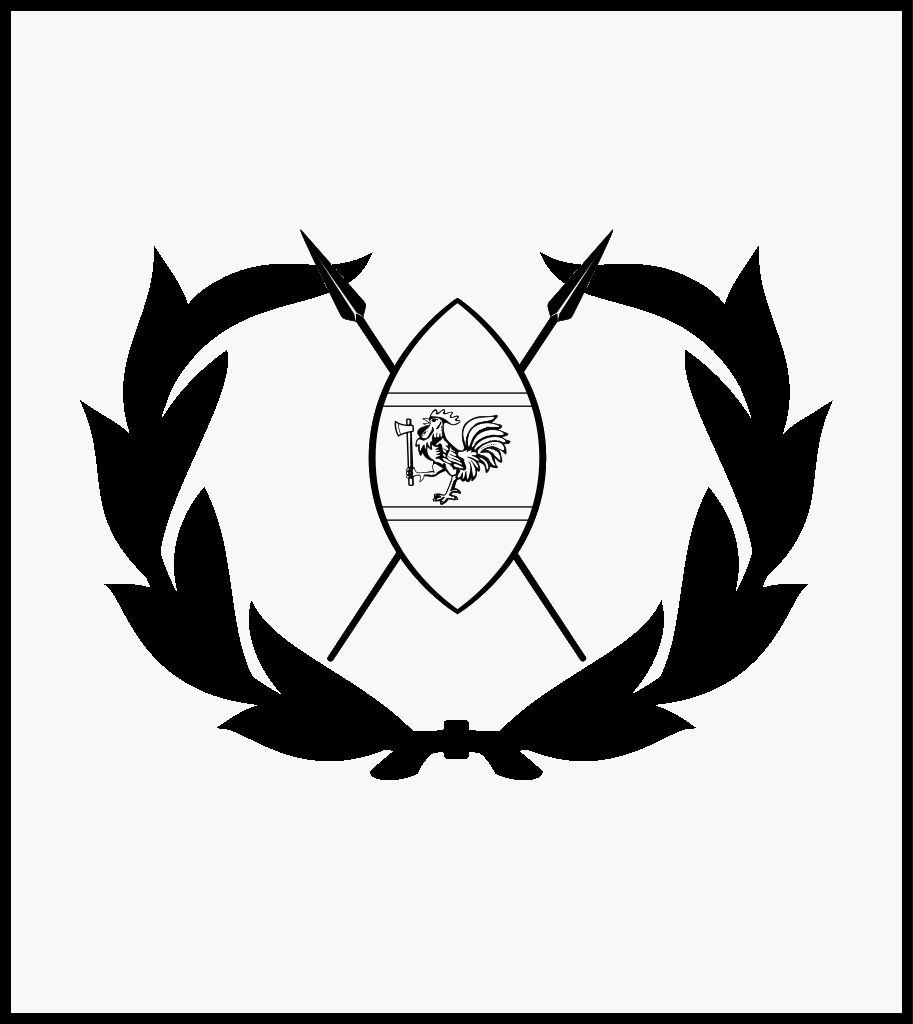
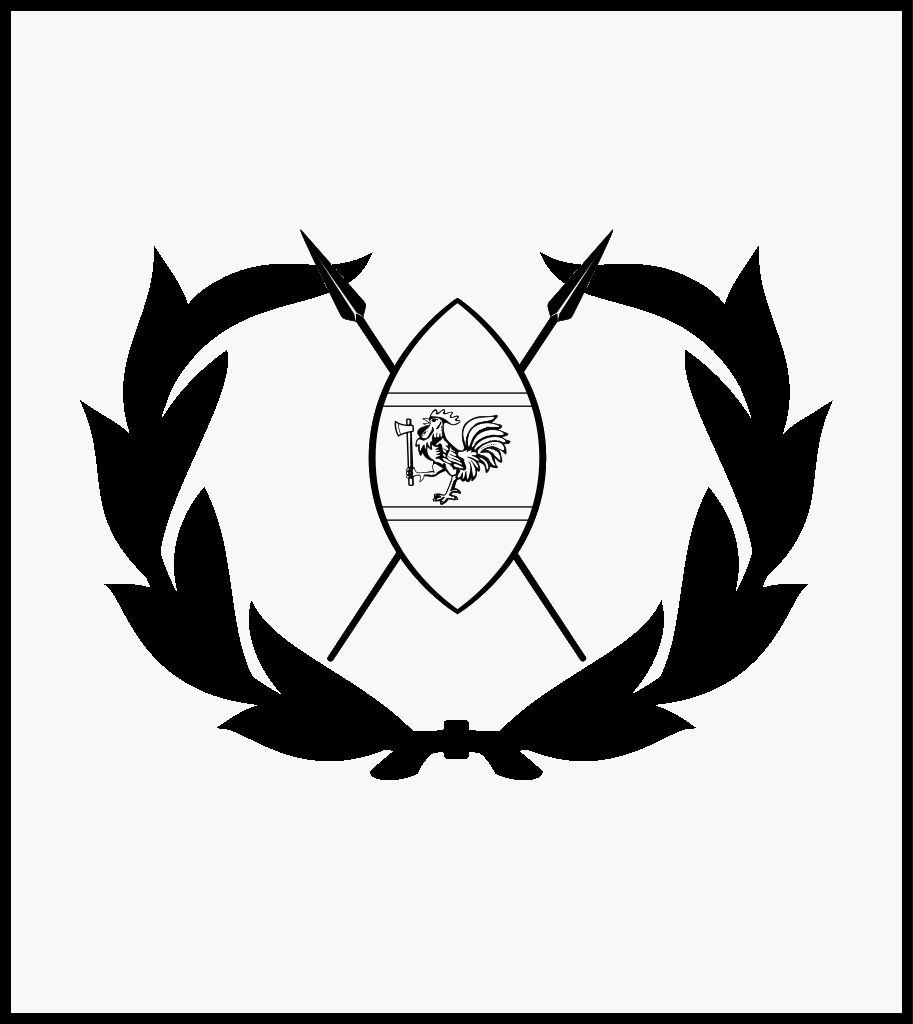
Rank group	Senior NCOs				Junior NCOs		Enlisted
Kenya Army							No insignia
Kenya Army	Warrant officer class 1	Warrant officer class 2	Senior sergeant	Sergeant	Corporal	Lance corporal	Private (or equivalent)
Kenya Navy							No insignia
Kenya Navy	Warrant officer class 1	Warrant officer class 2	Senior sergeant	Sergeant	Corporal		Private (or equivalent)
Kenya Air Force							No insignia
Kenya Air Force	Warrant officer class 1	Warrant officer class 2	Senior sergeant	Sergeant	Corporal	Lance corporal	Aircraftman
Rank group	Senior NCOs				Junior NCOs		Enlisted
