= Jackson Mulinge =

Kenyan former military commander

Jackson Kimeu Mulinge
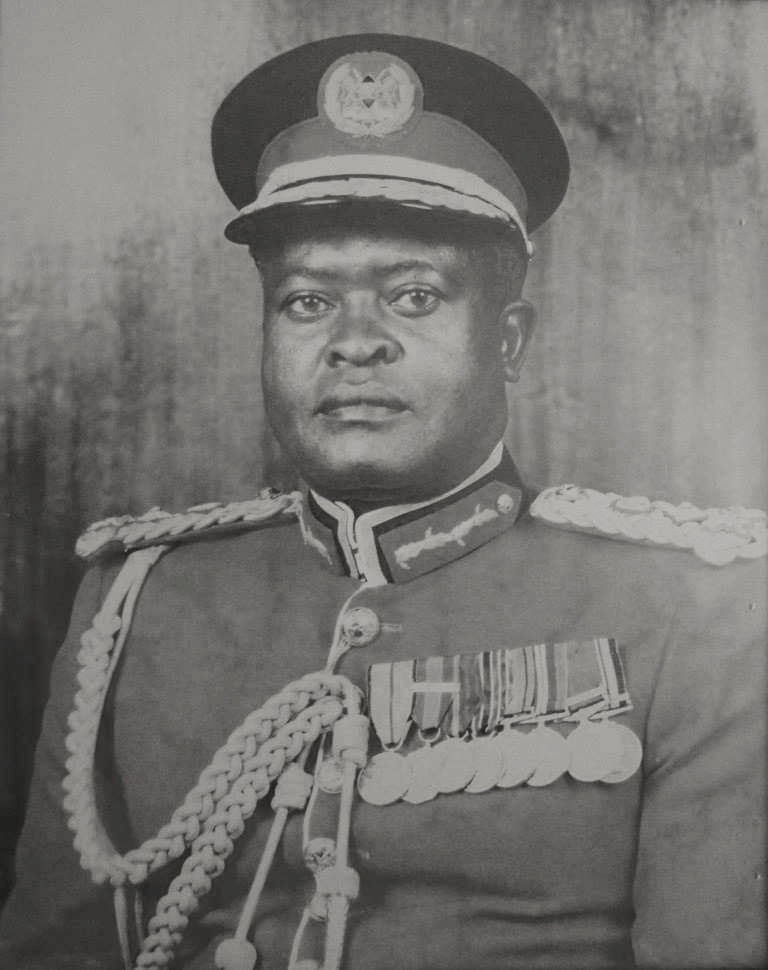
- General Jackson Mulinge
- Born: 1924; Machakos County, Kenya Colony
- Died: July 16, 2014 (aged 89–90); Nairobi, Kenya
- Education: Imperial Defence College
- Military career
- Allegiance: Kenya
- Branch: King's African Rifles; Kenya Army
- Service years: 1942-1986
- Rank: General
- Commands: Chief of General Staff; Commander Kenya Army; Deputy Commander, Kenya Army; Commanding Officer 3 Kenya Rifles Battalion
- Conflicts: Second World War; Malayan Emergency; Shifta War; 1982 Kenyan coup d'etat attempt
- Awards: Elder of the Golden Heart; Moran of the Burning Spear

Jackson Kimeu Mulinge was a Kenyan military officer, and Chief of the General Staff in the 1980s. He was the longest serving head of Kenya's Armed Forces and the first Kenyan military officer to attain the rank of four-star general.

== Early life ==
Mulinge was born in 1924 in Kathiani, present-day Machakos County. He was educated at the African Inland Mission school in Mumbuni and was selected by a colonial military officer due to his well-built physique.

== Career ==
He started off as a private in the King's African Rifles and would see action in Ethiopia against Italian troops. During the Malayan Emergency, Mulinge served as a Warrant Officer Platoon Commander in 3rd Battalion, the King's African Rifles c1952-53. Thirteen years after the Malayan tour, he attended the Imperial Defence College in London.

He was the first African officer in Kenya to receive the Queen's commission in 1961 as a second lieutenant and served as Commanding Officer of 3 Kenya Rifles Battalion from January 1964 in operations during the Shifta War. He was promoted as Deputy Commander of the Kenya Army on 28 November 1966 where he further distinguished himself during the Shifta War and was commended for having, "spent more time in the operational area than any other senior officer, never relaxing his efforts to attain peak military efficiency and bring the shifta to battle", before appointment as Commander, Kenya Army from 1971-1978.

He is credited with averting two coup attempts against Presidents Jomo Kenyatta and Daniel Arap Moi. His refusal to participate in a coup plot against Jomo Kenyatta would see his loyalty rewarded when he was promoted to replace Major General Joseph Musyimi Lele Ndolo. As Chief of General Staff he helped quash the 1982 coup attempt organised by junior air force officers that tried to overthrow then President Moi. This would earn him the full trust of President Moi in which a U.S. intelligence assessment of 1983 wrote that Mulinge was "the most influential and powerful figure in the armed forces" and at the time "enjoy[ed] the full confidence" of President Moi.

== Death ==
He died on 16 July 2014 aged 91 years in Nairobi. He was buried with full military honours including a 21-gun salute with President Uhuru Kenyatta and other national leaders among those in attendance. President Kenyatta eulogised Mulinge as "a great soldier who led a life of honour, service and patriotism". Former President Moi in his condolence message read at the funeral service described his death as a huge loss "The death of Mulinge has robbed Kenyans of one of the most industrious sons who was always ready to take responsibility for his actions. He was truly a great hero."

== Awards ==
In addition to military honours earned over his long service he was awarded national honours that included Elder of the Golden Heart and Moran of the Burning Spear.
