= 1st Canine Regiment =

Kenyan Army regiment

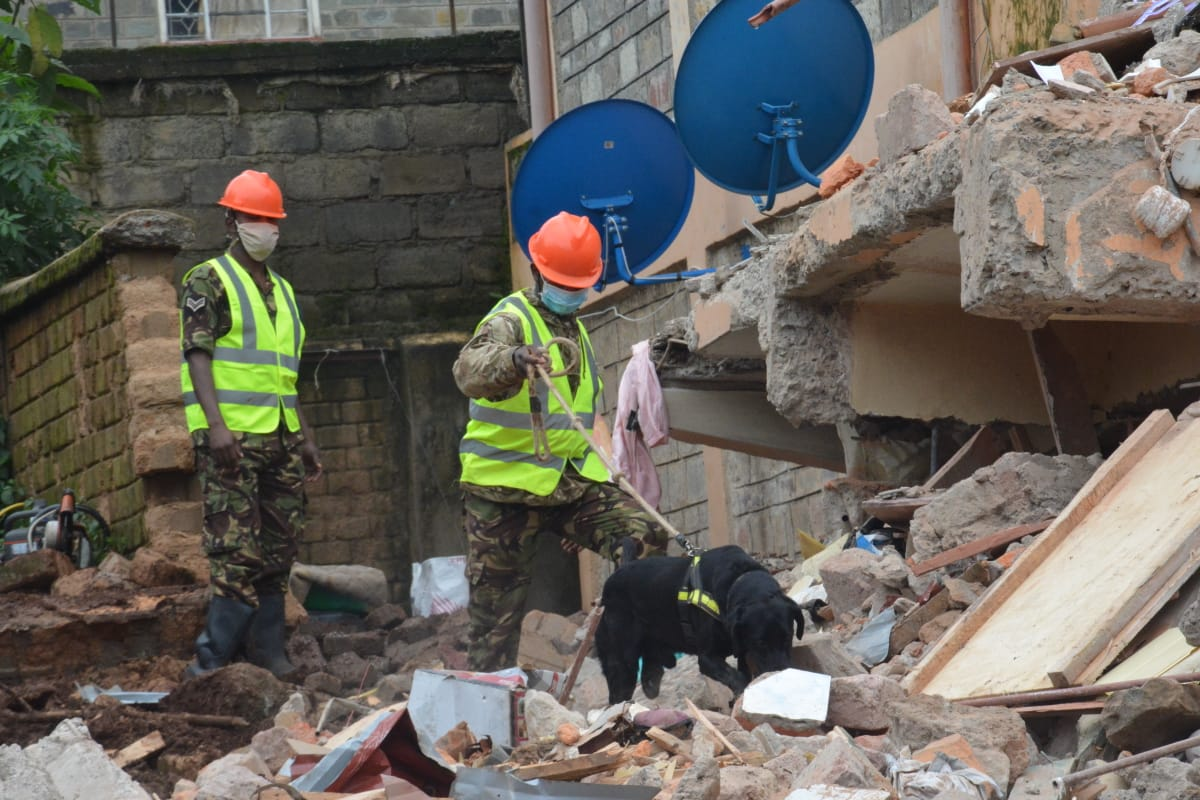
- A dog and handler from the 1st Canine Regiment.
- Founded: 2012
- Country: Kenya
- Branch: Army
- Type: Canine
- Part of: Kenya Defence Forces
- Garrison/HQ: Embakasi Garrison

The 1st Canine Regiment's mission is to provide dogs as a force multiplier at times of war and peace to the Kenya Army. The unit was established in 2012 and is based at Embakasi Garrison. Kenya is the only country in East Africa with a fully formed and independent canine unit within its military. The unit is trained in explosive detection, patrolling, search and rescue and road and building clearing. The regiment relies on a variety of dogs from the Belgian Malinois and Labrador Retriever to the German Shepherd depending on the range and type of mission assigned.

The Regiment is experienced having been deployed to border posts particularly those close to the Somali border for patrols and road clearance missions against Improvised Explosive Devices. The unit has also been deployed in search and rescue missions on collapsed buildings in the country. The regiment also regularly engages in training exercises with the U.S. Army's 403rd Civil Affairs Battalion and the Combined Joint Task Force-Horn of Africa dog handlers from Camp Lemoinner.
