= Mount Elgon insurgency =

2005 conflict in Mount Elgon District, Kenya

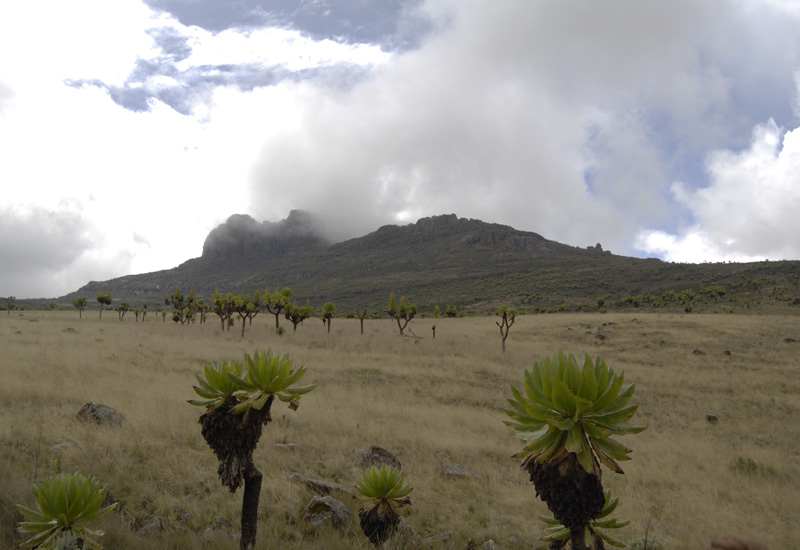
- Mount Elgon
Date	2005 – March 2008
Location	Mount Elgon District, Kenya
Status	Kenyan victory

Belligerents
Sabaot Land Defence Force	Kenya Defence Forces

Casualties and losses
- c. 600 killed 46,000 displaced 300 missing

The Mount Elgon insurgency was a conflict that started in 2005 when the Sabaot Land Defence Force militia revolted in the Mount Elgon area, Western Kenya.

== Background ==
In the 1920s and the 1930s, British Kenya had displaced many native Sabaots in the modern-day Trans-Nzoia County. Most of their arable lands were given to new settlers, who became farmers in the area. The Kenyan Government gave later in the 1960s a 7,700-hectare (19,000-acre) amount of land to landless families after its independence in 1963 from the UK. The SLDF was formed in 2005 to resist government eviction of squatters in Mount Elgon District. There were claims of corruption and land grabbing in the settlement process and it was viewed as an outfit formed and equipped by local politicians to prevent the resettlement process. The group would claim nationwide notoriety in the months leading to the December 2007 election when militia members launched a terror campaign targeting opponents of the Orange Democratic Movement which was the main opposition party at the time.

== Operation Okoa Maisha ==
The Kenyan government at first did not take the activities of the Sabaot Land Defence Force seriously and chose to initially deploy police and paramilitary units to Mount Elgon District. It was only after violence persisted with increasing casualties inflicted on civilians and security forces that the government came to the realization that the group had morphed from a criminal group to a rebel outfit.

A large scale military operation by the Kenya Army dubbed 'Operation Okoa Maisha' (Operation Save Lives) was launched in March 2008 with it being the first deployment of Kenya's nascent special forces units drawn from the 20th Parachute Battalion along with regular infantry units. The SLDF who had enjoyed freedom of movement particularly at night quickly retreated to the forests. The operation was bedeviled with gross human rights violations by both sides with civilians caught in the middle. Civilians reported arbitrary detentions and torture of young males from the Sabaot community by the army. The SLDF was notorious for its level of violence meted out on the civilian populace with the cutting off of ears being a well known tactic.

The military operation led to intense fighting in the forests and caves around Mount Elgon notably at night but within a month the fighting had taken its toll on the rebels. On 16 May 2008 the leader of SLDF Wycliffe Matakwei was cornered along with a band of fighters and eventually killed in the assault by army units. His death and those of two other commanders marked the start of a rapid de-escalation of fighting with numerous rebels choosing to surrender marking a decisive victory for the Kenyan military.

== Arrests and charges ==
Reportedly, local church elders knew of 200 people who have gone missing since being arrested; about 1,500 have been formally charged. The Kenyan military has been criticized for the manner in which the operation was conducted particularly in the Chebyuk settlement area with dozens of people arrested allegedly having been executed with many more missing. The SLDF abducted many children who remain unaccounted for with many of the young men forcibly recruited being killed in fighting during the operation.
