= 3 Kenya Rifles =

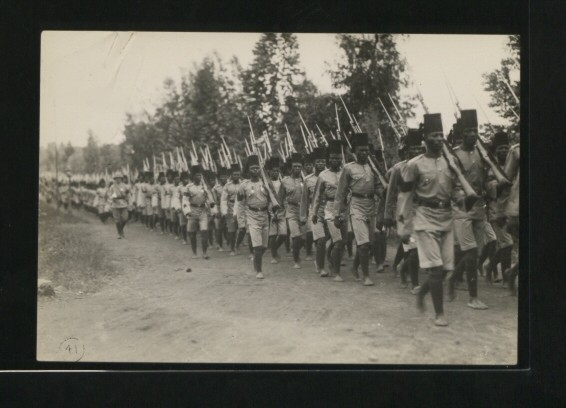
- Active: 1888; 138 years ago
- Country: Kenya
- Branch: Kenya Army
- Type: Infantry battalion
- Role: Light Role Infantry
- Garrison/HQ: Lanet Barracks, Nakuru
- Nickname: The Scarlets
- Colours: Red
- Engagements: First World War; Shifta War; Operation Linda Nchi; African Union Mission in Somalia

3 Kenya Rifles (nicknamed The Scarlets; possibly 3rd Battalion, The Kenya Rifles) is an infantry battalion, the senior-most unit of the Kenya Army Infantry.

== History ==
It traces its history back to the first private armed forces recruited by the British East Africa Company in 1888 to protect its trading interests and to region. The battalion later became the 3rd Battalion, Kings African Rifles stationed at Fort Jesus in Mombasa in 1900. During the First World War, the battalion was involved in expeditions and campaigns against the Germans in East Africa. When the Somali Republic gained independence in 1960, it took part in the Shifta War when the battalion was notably commanded by Lieutenant-Colonel Jackson Mulinge.

== Current Role ==
The battalion carries on with its defence duties under the larger Kenya Army and has recently been heavily involved in counter-insurgency operations against Al-Shabaab in Southern Somalia. On occasion the unit also participates in ceremonial duties such as national parades and other state events. The battalion has won many trophies in various fields of competition like rifle shooting, athletics, boxing and football.

The battalion is allied with the Royal Gloucestershire, Berkshire and Wiltshire Regiment of the British Army.

== Narung'ombe Day ==
Every 19 July the battalion celebrates its regimental day dubbed 'Narung'ombe Day' in honour of soldiers who have perished while serving in the unit. The day is named after the Battle of Narungombe that took place in Tanzania during the first world war. The date was subsequently adopted as the regimental day due to the unit's gallantry during the battle.
