= Kenya Army Armoured Brigade =

Branch of the Kenya army tasked with anti armour operarations

The Kenya Army Armoured Brigade is the formation tasked with conducting operations against enemy armour and providing close support to infantry units in military operations.

== Overview ==
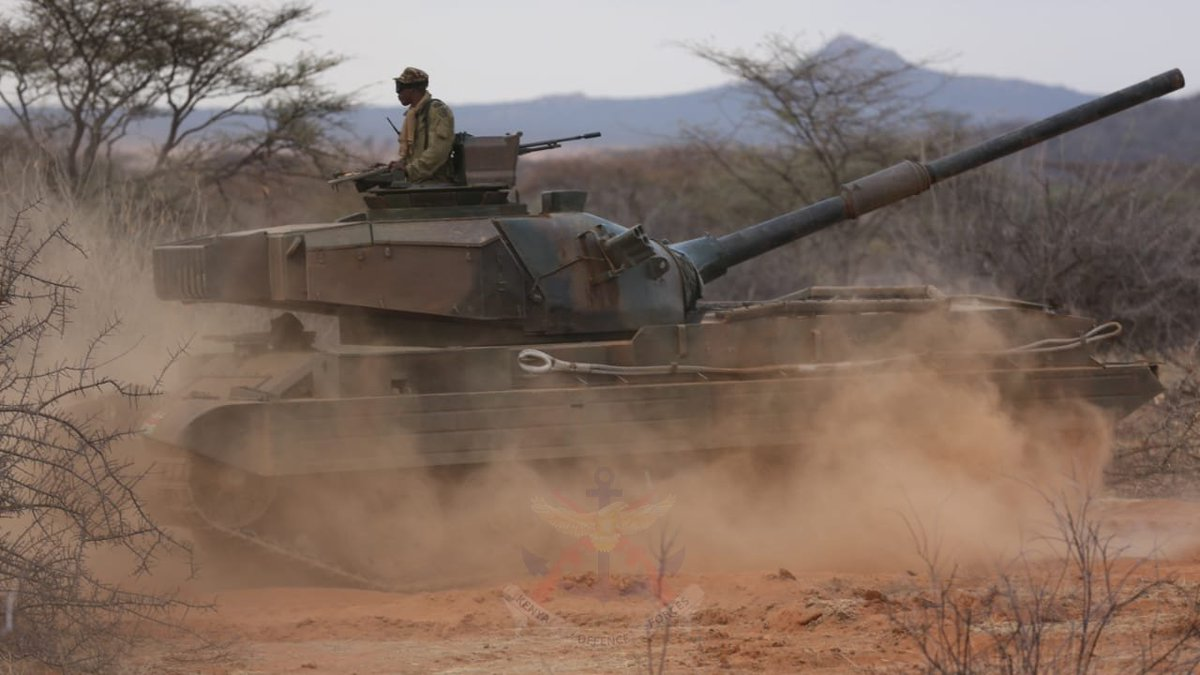
Kenya Army tank conducting maneuvers

The brigade was formed as a result of an expansion of capabilities and equipment within the army to counter emerging threats from neighbouring countries. The armoured Brigade was formally established in 1979 and was made up of one main tank battalion and one armoured reconnaissance battalion. The Brigade Headquarters was located at Isiolo Barracks in 1990. The brigade is currently equipped with Vickers Main Battle Tank Mark 3 and T-72 Main Battle Tanks to combat enemy armour. The brigade is also equipped with a number of Panhard AML for reconnaissance missions. The entire formation consists of five battalions, with three handling the main battle tanks and two equipped for armoured reconnaissance. The School of Armour that trains crew and other personnel is also under the brigade in Isiolo Barracks.

== 76 Armoured Reconnaissance Battalion ==
The first unit formed was the 76 Armoured Reconnaissance Battalion at the Kenya Army Headquarters, though its roots can be traced back to 1968. The unit was equipped with Ferret Scout cars and in 1969 was designated as a Light Armoured Squadron. The LAS was made up of two Ferret Scout cars and one troop of Saladin cars. The troop was then moved to Gilgil to form part of the Support Battalion under the command of Major J. Munyao. The Army command envisioned the growth of the unit to combat the rising challenges at the time and a number of Panhard AML 245 cars were procured from France. The Panhards would help in forming the first squadron which would give rise to the 76th Armoured Reconnaissance Battalion. This battalion would immediately be utilised in countering the threat from then President of Uganda Idi Amin in Western Kenya when it was mobilized as a response to threats of annexation.

== 86 Armoured Reconnaissance Battalion ==
This is the second armoured unit in the brigade tasked with reconnaissance and is based at Isiolo. The battalion has been deployed to Somalia and Northern Kenya in operations for counter insurgency operations. They are similarly equipped to the 76th, with several Panhards and WZ-551 armoured personnel carriers.

== 78 Tank Battalion ==
The unit can trace its roots back to 1963, during the early days of the Kenya Army, when it inherited four Ferret Scout cars from a small light armoured sub-unit. These scout cars were in use until 1967 when newly acquired Saladin cars were used in forming a reconnaissance squad. In 1976, the Saladin Squadron was developed into Armoured Reconnaissance Battalion with the acquisition of Panhards.

In the 1970s, the army saw the need to form a main tank battalion and thus the 78 Tank Battalion was established in 1978 along with a sister unit, the 81 Tank Battalion, in 1981. The unit was formed by a squadron carved from the 76 Armoured Reconnaissance Battalion and was initially based in Gilgil and assigned a light Armoured Squadron.

== 81 Tank Battalion ==
It was formed in 1981 at Lanet under the command of then Major J. J. Wang'ombe. It was carved from the 78th Tank Battalion and the 76 Armoured Reconnaissance Battalion under with Captain Mwangangi as the commanding officer. The unit was assigned its first batch of soldiers from Armed Forces Technical College in August 1981, and three tanks followed the following month. By 1983, the unit had been fully established with three fighting squadrons and equipment.
