= National Security Industries Ruiru =

National Security Industries is a small arms factory in Ruiru, Kiambu County, Kenya, which was formally launched on 8 April 2021. The factory was set up to manufacture small arms to serve local security forces and currently has a manufacturing capacity of 12,000 assault weapons a year with a rate of at least 1,000 a month. The factory was built at a cost of US$37.5 million and is intended to fully meet the demands of Kenya's security forces within five years by diversifying production to upper and lower receivers for 5.56mm AR15-type assault rifles, 7.62mm rifles and 9mm pistols
