= Kenya Army Artillery Brigade =

Artillery brigade of Kenya Army

This is the Kenya Army formation dedicated towards providing artillery support to infantry and mechanized units in the army.

== Overview ==
The Kenya Army Artillery Brigade consists of four artillery battalions with one dedicated to air defence. This brigade is made up of 66 Artillery Battalion, 75 Artillery Battalion, 77 Artillery Battalion and 8 Artillery Battalion. The Artillery Brigade is equipped predominantly with the L118 Light Gun but recent acquisitions have been made consisting of the Nora B-52 which is Kenya's first self-propelled gun and the M119A2 which is the American version of the 105mm Light Gun. The Brigade has its main headquarters in Isiolo but the various formations are found in various other garrisons across the country. The School of Artillery formed in 1966 is where all artillerymen of the Kenya Army undergo specialized training after completing their basic training at the Recruits Training School in Eldoret. The school is based at Archers Post having been relocated there from Gilgil in 1983.

== 66 Artillery Battalion ==
The oldest unit is the 66 Artillery Battalion which was first mooted in 1964 but was formed on November 29, 1966 hence given the name '66' to denote the year it was formed. The first battery consisted of 120mm Tampella mortars which were acquired from Israel and the first ceremonial firing was done on top of Menengai Crater. The mortar unit was known as the First Mortar Battery and in 1975 more mortars were acquired which led to the formation of C troop. The First Battery was detached from 66 Artillery Battalion and was assigned under the command of 'Headquarter Artillery Brigade'.

Kenyatta Barracks in Gilgil is home to Kenya's only airborne battalion, the 20th Battalion and also home to the 66 Artillery Battalion and the 1st Mortar Battalion

== 75 Artillery Battalion ==
'75' denotes the year the first air defence guns were acquired by the Kenya Army. 2 Battery which was then under 66 Artillery Battalion was integrated into the Kenya Air Force Ground Air Defence Unit in September 1978. In 1982 elements of the Kenya Air Force failed in their coup attempt and GADU was disbanded following the resulting purge. This led to equipment and elements being transferred into the Kenya Army. At present the unit is a fully-fledged Air Defence Battalion based in Embakasi Garrison.

== 77 Artillery Battalion ==
The unit was transferred from Naivasha to Mombasa in 1979 and it was the result of a plan mooted in 1977 to form a second field artillery unit hence the assigned '77'. The battalion was based in Nyali Barracks from 1979-1989 when it was relocated to Mariakani Barracks. It is believed that Kenya's first self-propelled artillery guns were assigned to this field unit and were spotted with this unit in southern Somalia.

== 88 Artillery Battalion ==
It was established at Larisoro, Isiolo County on 27 April 2018. During the handing over ceremony newer field guns of the Kenya Army were spotted including the Nora B-52 self-propelled gun.
