= Buna, Kenya =

Buna
- Populated place
- Location in Kenya
- Coordinates: 2°47′19″N 39°30′53″E
- Country: Kenya
- County: Wajir County
- Elevation: 1,200 m (3,900 ft)

Population (2019)
  - Total: 49,886
- Postal code: 70200
- Area code: 46
- Climate: BSh

Buna is a small town and Sub-County in Wajir County, situated in the North Eastern Province in Kenya. Nearby towns and places include Ajao and Bute Helu.

== History ==
Buna historically is remembered as the deepest point of penetration by the Italian Army during World War II in Kenya. The city was occupied in July 1940 and an Italian garrison remained there until January 1941

== Climate ==
Climate data for Buna
Month	Jan	Feb	Mar	Apr	May	Jun	Jul	Aug	Sep	Oct	Nov	Dec	Year
Mean daily maximum °C (°F)	35 (95)	36 (96)	36 (96)	34 (94)	33 (92)	32 (90)	31 (88)	32 (89)	33 (91)	33 (92)	33 (91)	33 (92)	33 (92)
Mean daily minimum °C (°F)	21 (70)	22 (72)	23 (74)	24 (75)	23 (73)	21 (70)	21 (69)	21 (69)	21 (70)	22 (71)	22 (71)	23 (73)	22 (71)
Average precipitation mm (inches)	5.1 (0.2)	13 (0.5)	20 (0.8)	69 (2.7)	36 (1.4)	0 (0)	5.1 (0.2)	2.5 (0.1)	5.1 (0.2)	25 (1)	41 (1.6)	23 (0.9)	240 (9.5)
Source: Weatherbase

== See also ==
- Wajir County
- North Eastern Province
