= Kenya in World War II =

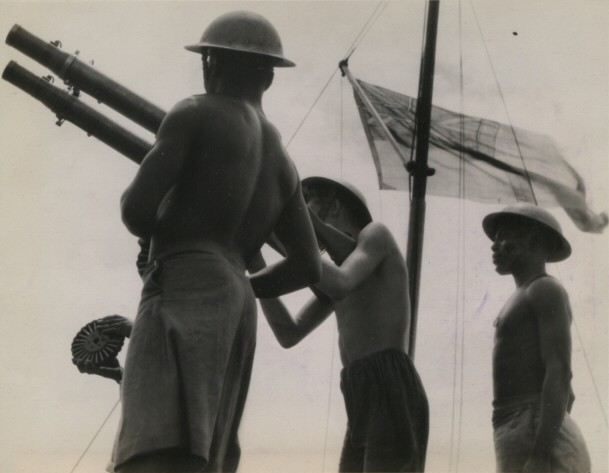
Kenyan sailors aboard a Royal Navy minesweeper, 1945

The involvement of the British Colony of Kenya in World War II (Swahili: Vita vya Pili vya Dunia) began with the declaration of war on Nazi Germany by the British Empire in September 1939.

Though some fighting with Italian troops occurred in Kenya itself from June 1940 to February 1941, it remained an important economic asset for the Allies and also contributed a significant number of soldiers to fight in the British Army.

== Outbreak of war ==
Kenya bordered Italian East Africa to the north, and at the start of the war, it was feared that the much larger Italian army would advance into Kenya as it had into British Somaliland. The King's African Rifles (KAR), responsible for the defence of the whole of British-occupied east Africa with the Somaliland Camel Corps and Sudan Defence Force, numbered just 2,900 men in 1939, compared with the 250,000 Italian colonial troops in the region.

A drought in 1939–40 and accompanying crop failure, known at the time as the "Famine of the Italian", also encouraged Kenyans from the agricultural Akamba in eastern Kenya, who had not traditionally joined the army in large numbers, to enlist. Enemy aliens in the colony were interned or placed under supervision.

== Italian attacks ==
British foray into Italian Ethiopia, early 1941

While the feared large-scale invasion did not occur, smaller incursions into Kenya were conducted in concert with similar operations against Sudan. In the summer of 1940, Kenya saw combat between Commonwealth forces and Italy. The first action of the East African Campaign was the Italian bombing of the South Rhodesian air base at Wajir on 13 June.

Italian troops advanced from Ethiopia into Moyale and took "Fort Harrington" after heavy fighting. By the end of July they had advanced almost 100 kilometres (62 mi) into Kenya and occupied Buna and Dabel, halting their advance due to concerns about the poor supply situation. These areas remained under Italian control until liberated in February 1941 as part of the Allied offensive into Italian East Africa.

(In Kenya) our troops have occupied Sukela, Terkali, Tagaba, Kokaiya Dula and Danisa cutting the area of Kenya that entered inside Somalia toward Dolo and so the border-line was cut of 300 km. A tentative of enemy attack in the lake Rodolfo area has been defeated with the help of the local population (Daasanach tribe), with heavy losses for the enemy "Bollettino di Guerra" 36 of July 16, 1940 (Italian War bulletin 36)

On 6 September 1940, near Liboi a column the 2nd East African Brigade under British command was attacked and partially destroyed by a force of Banda and Italian Colonial infantry: it was the first action involving South African ground troops in World War II The British troops later retaliated with a first attack on the Somali-Kenyan village of El Wak, but were not successful.

According to Arrigo Pertacco, Buna historically is remembered as the Italian Army's deepest point of penetration into Kenya during the war. The city was occupied in July 1940 and a permanent Italian garrison made mainly by Somalis of the area remained there until the end of January 1941.

Malindi was one of the only two big towns in Kenya bombed by Italian airplanes. This happened on October 24, 1940 when the port of Malindi was damaged, and after this event Allied troops were stationed in the town until the end of the war.

After the partial success of the 1st South African Infantry Brigade against the Italians at another El Wak border post attack on 16 December 1940, Lieutenant-General Alan Cunningham ordered a full attack on the Italians in eastern Kenya. In the last days of January 1941, two South African brigades of the 1st South African Infantry Division attacked the Italian-controlled territory in Kenya from Marsabit.

However before advancing into southern Abyssinia, General George Brink was compelled to protect his western flank and to deny water sources to the Italians. For this reason, on 16 January the 1st Natal Mounted Rifles (of the 2nd Brigade), No 2 Armoured Car Company, 12 SA Field Battery and two irregular companies attacked the string of wells at "El Yibo" and "El Sardu" in the Kenyan Northern Frontier District. After four days of heavy fighting, and with the Brink attacks supported by the South African Air Force, the Italians were forced to move away from El Yibo on the night of 17 January and on the afternoon of the 18 January, the 2nd Field Force Battalion, which had been moved up from the brigade reserve, entered an abandoned El Sardu. With the only water sources in the area in the hands of the South Africans, the advance into Abyssinia could commence.

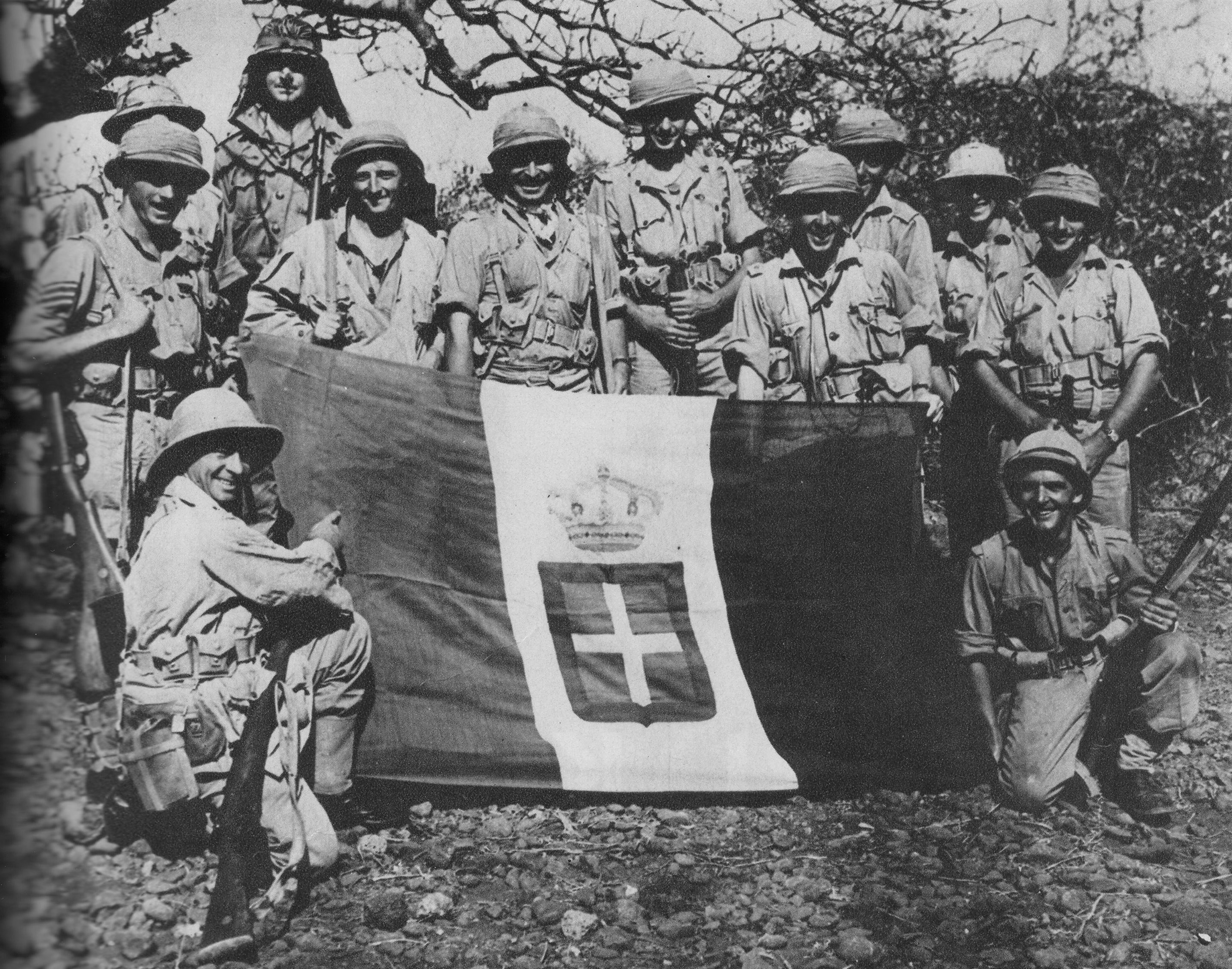
South African troops in Moyale pose with an Italian flag

On 18 February, the Commonwealth forces entered southern Ethiopia and conquered the fort-city of Mega. The two South African brigades then launched a double flanking movement on the area. After a three-day battle in which many of the South Africans—equipped for tropical conditions—suffered from exposure because of the heavy rains and near freezing temperatures.

However west of Lake Rudolf, the 25th East African Brigade of Brig. W. Owen marched on Namaraputh with the objective of taking the town of Kalam near the Ethiopia-Kenya border. Opposition from local pro-Italian Merille tribesman in the area was so fierce that the Brigade was compelled to cease its advance and to go on the defensive.

Finally, Moyale—70 miles southeast of Mega on the border between Kenya and Ethiopia—was occupied on 22 February by a patrol of Abyssinian irregular troops which had been attached to the South African Division. Meanwhile on 24 January, Cunningham's main force, including the 11th (African) Division (Major-General H. E. de R. Wetherall) and the 12th (African) Division (Major-General Alfred Reade Godwin-Austen), invaded the "Somalia italiana" from coastal Kenya.

== Military involvement ==
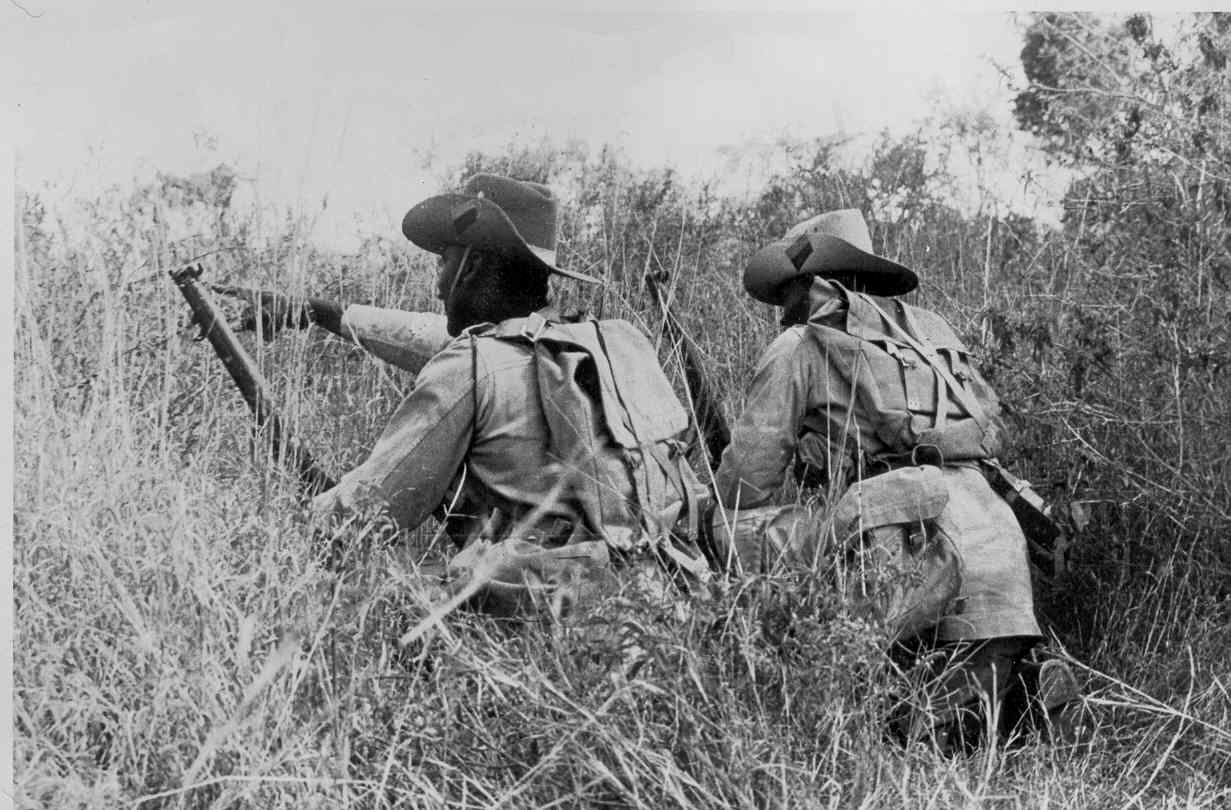
Soldiers of the King's African Rifles train in Kenya, 1944

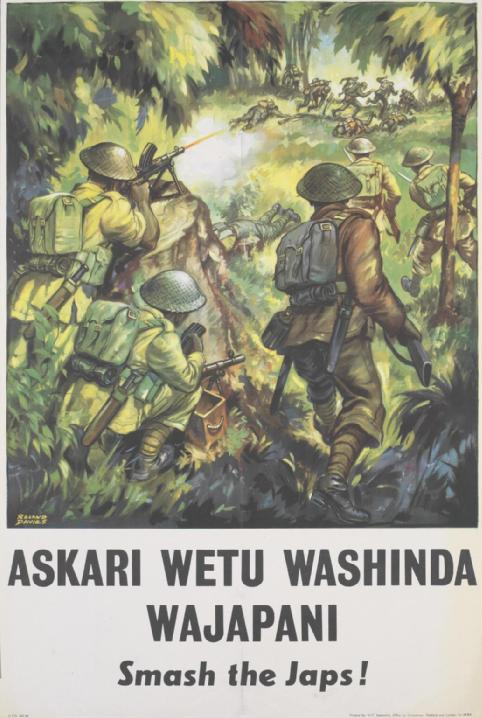
Propaganda poster from Kenya: it reads, in Swahili, "Our Askaris Beat the Japanese"

During the war, Kenya was one of the single most important recruiting grounds for the British Army in Africa. During the course of the war, 98,240 Kenyans were recruited as Askaris into the King's African Rifles, representing 30% of the unit's total strength. The vast majority of soldiers from Kenya, of whom most were volunteers, were overwhelmingly black, however racial segregation policies in the King's African Rifles and other colonial units meant that they were commanded by white officers and NCOs. Blacks were not able to rise above the rank of warrant officer. Kenyan soldiers served in the successful East African Campaign against the Italians, as well as the invasion of Vichy-held Madagascar and the Burma Campaign against the Japanese, alongside troops from west Africa. Kenyans also served in the Royal Navy and some individuals also served in the Royal Air Force.

Nigel Gray Leakey, a white NCO in the King's African Rifles from Kenya, was posthumously awarded the Victoria Cross for bravery in East Africa.

In 1942, the entire British Eastern Fleet transferred to Kilindini near Mombasa in Kenya, after its existing base at Colombo in Ceylon became threatened by the Japanese. The Far East Combined Bureau, an outpost of the British codebreaking centre at Bletchley Park, was also moved to a former school in Kilindini in 1942, where it worked on deciphering Japanese naval codes.

Kenya also gave its name to a British cruiser which served during the war, although it did not directly contribute to its crew.

== Economic contribution ==
Kenya was an important source of agricultural products in the British Empire, supplying significant quantities of tea and tobacco. Traditionally, the Kenyan highlands (where much of the colony's agriculture was centred) were controlled by white farmers. Greater demands for agricultural products during the war caused the colonial authorities to order 200,000 Kenyan labourers to live and work on white-owned land until the end of the war in 1945.

== Detainment ==
Significant numbers of Italian soldiers captured during the East African Campaign were interned in camps in Kenya, where they were used in civil infrastructure projects. Amongst those detained in Kenya was the Italian writer, Felice Benuzzi, who attempted to escape in 1943 by climbing Mount Kenya, though subsequently re-surrendered to the British. He detailed his experiences in his popular book, No Picnic on Mount Kenya (1947).

== Legacy ==
"We Africans were told over and over again that we were fighting for our country and democracy and that when the war was over we would be rewarded for the sacrifice we were making...The life I returned to was exactly the same as the one I left four years earlier: no land, no job, no representation, no dignity."

— Kango Muchai, Kenyan KAR veteran

The economic mobilization of Kenya during the war led to an unprecedented level of urbanization in the country, swelling the population of Mombasa and Nairobi by as much as 50%.

Kenyan soldiers returning home after the war were much less likely to accept the radians of racism which had existed in the country before the war. Returning Kenyan soldiers also found themselves competing with Indian migrants for scarce jobs, and were little better off than before the war.

When the ban on political activism was lifted in 1944, the Kenya African Study Union (KASU) was founded in October 1944 as a nationwide political party to campaign for independence from the British and the creation of a multi-ethnic state. Although few Kenyan soldiers joined the party itself, many were active in the pro-independence movement which would culminate in the Mau Mau Uprising in 1952.

== Bibliography ==
- Gadsden, F. (1986). "Wartime Propaganda in Kenya: The Kenya Information Office, 1939–1945". International Journal of African Historical Studies. 19 (3): 401–420. doi:10.2307/218973. JSTOR 218973.
- Killingray, D.; Plaut, M. (2010). Fighting for Britain: African Soldiers in the Second World War. Woodbridge: Boydell & Brewer. ISBN 9781847010155.
- Moyse-Bartlett, H. (2012). The King's African Rifles. Vol. 2. Luton: Andrews UK Limited. ISBN 9781781506639.
- Odhiambo, E.; Lonsdale, J. (2003). Mau Mau & Nationhood: Arms, Authority & Narration. Columbus: Ohio State University Press. ISBN 9780852554845.
- Petacco, A. (1995). La nostra guerra 1940–1945: L'Italia al fronte tra bugie e verità (in Italian). Turin: UTET. ISBN 9788851141042.
