= Kenya Army Engineers Brigade =

The mission of the Kenya Army Engineers Brigade is to support the Kenya Army in defence of the country against external aggression and to aid civil authority in humanitarian or civic projects.

== Overview ==
The Engineers Brigade is divided into two battalions namely the 10th Engineers Battalion and the 12th Engineers Battalion. The unit is based at Thika and the School of Combat Engineering (SOCE) is the premier school for army engineers in the Kenya Army. The brigade has recently been deployed to Somalia and the frontier counties to assist in building barriers, clearing roads of improvised explosive devices, setting up base fortifications and building a border wall. They are also involved in numerous civic projects across the country such as construction of schools and drilling of water wells. The brigade can trace its formation back to 1965 when an engineer squadron made up of personnel from assault pioneers platoon was formed in Gilgil.

== 10 Engineers Battalion ==
The Kenya Army formed a Corps of Engineers in 1965 as an Engineer Company headquartered in Gilgil Barracks. The company was made up of a Headquarter troop, Field troop and a Plant troop totaling 120 men. The unit would later be moved to Nanyuki which still remains the battalion's current headquarters. The battalion would emerge in its current form in July 1979 with the formation of another battalion and it was subsequently renamed as 10 Engineers Battalion.

== 12 Engineers Battalion ==
The army saw the need to expand the engineers due to a number of expansion projects the Kenyan military was undertaking. These included expanding vast training areas and the Kenya Air Force range at Archer's Post in Samburu County. There was also the fact that the army had increased the number of infantry units and the decision was made to build up a second engineering battalion. A combat engineer troop that had been deployed to Nanyuki in 1978 was chosen and it was initially based at Archers Post before being relocated to Thika.
