= Vickers MBT Mark 3 =

Vickers MBT Mk. 3
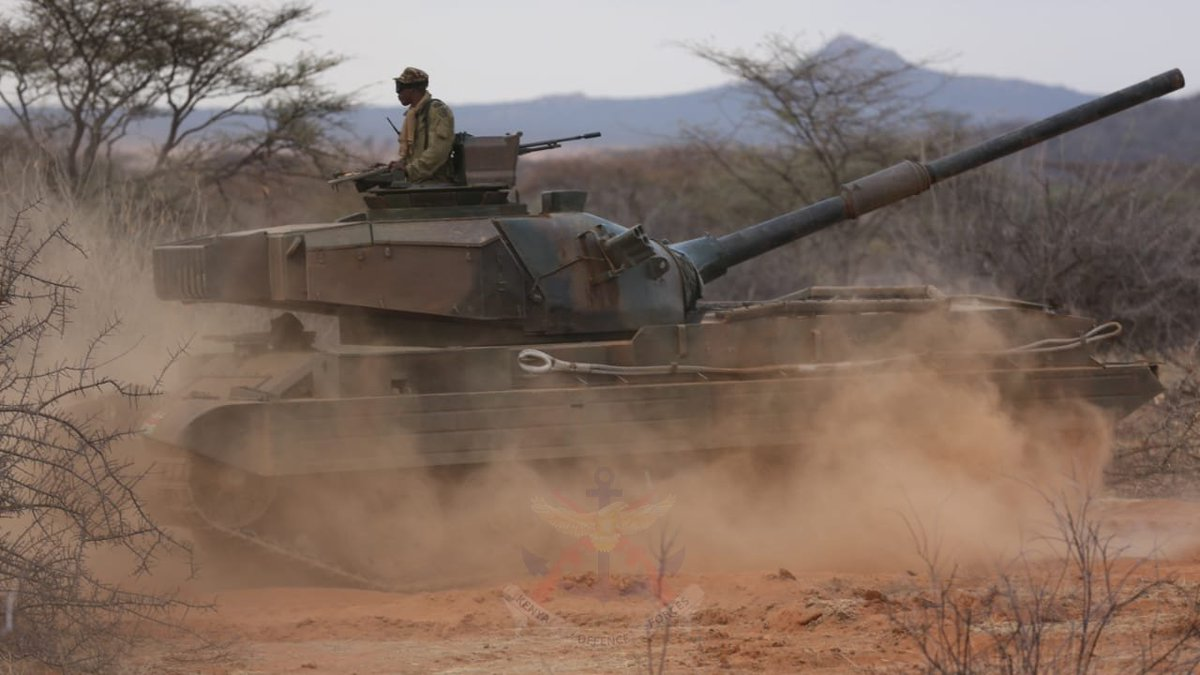
- Vickers MBT Mk. 3 of Kenya Army in 2021
- Type: Main battle tank
- Place of origin: United Kingdom

Service history
- In service: 1977–present (Kenya); 1981–present (Nigeria)
- Wars: Somali Civil War; Boko Haram insurgency Operation Linda Nchi

Production history
- Unit cost: $1.6 million
- No. built: 226

Specifications
- Mass: 39.5–40 t (38.9–39.4 long tons; 43.5–44.1 short tons)
- Length: 7.56 m (24 ft 10 in) (hull); 9.78 m (32 ft 1 in) (with gun forward)
- Width: 3.24 m (10 ft 8 in)
- Height: 2.44 m (8 ft 0 in)
- Crew: 4 (commander, gunner, loader and driver)
- Armour: welded and cast steel
- Main armament: 105 mm L7A2 rifled gun (50 rounds)
- Secondary armament: 7.62 mm FN MAG coaxial machine gun (2600 rounds); 12.7 mm ranging machine-gun (700 rounds)
- Engine: GM Detroit Diesel 12V-71T; 720 hp (540 kW) at 2,500 rpm
- Power/weight: 18 hp/t
- Transmission: Self-Changing Gears Ltd TN12V5 fully automatic gearbox
- Suspension: torsion bars
- Ground clearance: 432 mm (17.0 in)
- Fuel capacity: 1,000 L (220 imp gal; 264 US gal)
- Operational range: 490 to 530 km (300 to 330 mi)
- Maximum speed: 50 km/h (31 mph)

The Vickers Main Battle Tank Mk. 3 is a main battle tank by Vickers, a development of the Vickers MBT, and introduced in 1975 for the export market. It was the last of the Vickers tanks to see sales in numbers abroad.

== History ==
In 1974, Vickers pressed on with development of a Mark 3 version of their Vickers MBT. This stems from Design No. 51400 T and differs from the Mark 1 mainly in having a turret with a well-shaped cast front welded to a fabricated armour plate body. It also has a cast gun mantlet which is better shaped from the point of view of its resistance to armour-piercing projectiles than the flat mantlet of the Mark. 1. The Mark 3 embodies various other improvements, such as an increase in the depression of its main gun from -7 to -10 degrees below the horizontal and an increase in the ammunition from 44 to 50 rounds. The first production order for Mk. 3 tanks was placed in 1977 by the Government of Kenya.

In 1977, Vickers acquired a £100 million trade deal to produce 76 Mk. 3 MBTs and 7 Mk. 3 ARV/ARRVs for the Kenyan Army. They were built at the Vickers Scotswood factory in Newcastle between 1977 and 1981.

In 1981, after five years of negotiations, Vickers signed a £115 million contract to provide 108 Mk. 3N "Eagle" tanks, 15 Mk. 3 AVLBs and 18 Mk. 3 ARV/ARRVs to the Nigerian Army. Tanzania took delivery of two Mk. 3 ARVs which are used to recover Chinese supplied MBTs.

In 1990, Nigeria ordered 64 more Mk. 3s for the amount of £282 million.

In 2015, several Mk.3N Eagles of the Nigerian Army were involved in the combat in Yola as part of the Boko Haram insurgency. Some of them were captured by Boko Haram insurgents and later re-captured by the Nigerian Army in Maiduguri.

== Technical characteristics ==
The Mk. 3 retains most of the proposed features of the Mk. 2. Others were the provision for infrared/white-light searchlights and the abandonment of flotation gear. A laser rangefinder of the type being fitted to the Chieftain was also proposed since the range of the L7 105 mm gun was well beyond that of the 12.7 mm ranging machine gun fitted. Some thought was also given the idea of mounting the heavier British L11 120 mm gun on the Vickers tank, but this was abandoned because the 105 mm L7-series rifled gun was becoming the NATO standard, 120 mm ammunition was more expensive than 105 mm and was used only by the British Army in Europe, and the weight advantage of the Vicker's tank would be reduced.

=== Sighting/fire control ===
The gunner is provided with a Barr & Stroud Tank Laser Sight (TLS) which was also featured on the FV4201 Chieftain main battle tank. The TLS has a magnification of ×1 and ×10, which is also provided with a ballistic graticule. The gunner's sight is linked to gun by a temperature-compensated link bar and to a collimator in the commander's cupola. The collimator projects an illuminated ballistic graticule image into the field of view of the commander's sight when the cupola and the turret are lined up. The commander can consequently lay and fire the main armament should the need arise. The commander is provided with a contra-rotating gear system that automatically lines up the turret (and therefore turret armaments) with the day/night sight. The cupola has one day/night sight periscope with a magnification of ×1 and ×10, and six periscopes for all-round observation.

The Marconi Radar and Control Systems EC620 system provides full weapon stabilisation. The Marconi Radar Control System SFC 600 computerized system is used as fire control system.

=== Mobility ===
The Mk. 3 is powered by a General Motors Detroit Diesel 12V-71T two-stroke diesel engine developing 720 bhp. A Rolls-Royce CV12 TCA developing 800 bhp was offered as an option. The suspension consists of torsion bars with smaller secondary torsion bars at wheel stations 1, 2 and 6.

=== Protection ===
Maximum protection is over the frontal arc of 60° on the welded hull and 45° on the cast turret. Elsewhere, protection is provided against near-burst medium artillery. Protection against mines is by means of additional floor patch plates.

== Additional specifications ==
- Length gun rear: 8.53 m
- Ground pressure: 0.89 kg/cm^{2}
- Maximum gradient 58%
- Maximum tilt: 30%
- Trench: 3 m
- Vertical obstacle: 0.83 m
- Fording depth: 1.1 m

== Variants ==
- Mk. 3 : original version used delivered to the Kenyan Army between 1977 and 1981, it features a Pilkington PE Condor combined day/night sight. The gunner has a Barr & Stroud TLS (Tank Laser Sight) with a magnification of ×1 and ×10, which is also provided with a ballistic graticule.
- Mk. 3N "Eagle" : Mark 3 used by the Nigerian Army, known locally as Eagle, it is fitted with a solid thermal shroud around its gun barrel and uses a Nanoquest L23 gunner sight featuring a Simrad LV352 laser rangefinder.
- Mk. 3(I) : In 1985, design work began on an improved Mk. 3 tank known as the Mark 3(I) (I stands for Improved) which was unveiled at the 1986 British Army Equipment Exhibition (BAEE). Two Mk. 3(I) were built and underwent trials in the desert in 1987. The improvements over the previous Mk. 3 specification comprise the following:
  - 850 bhp Rolls-Royce/Perkins CV12 TCE diesel coupled to the new T1200 transmission (6 fwd/2 rev)
  - 59 km/h (37 mph) top speed
  - Some design changes to the hull, most noticeably a cast glacis plate which improves its ballistic shape
  - Two additional periscopes for the driver
  - The fitting of a Muzzle Reference System (MRS)
  - New sprocket and wider tracks
  - Strengthened torsion bars suspension
  - Ground clearance raised by 25 mm
  - Weight : 41,000 kg
- Mk. 3(M) : In 1996, a decision was taken to rebuild an existing Mk. 3 to the Mk 3(M) standard (M stands for Modernized or Malaysia). This was completed late in 1996 and subsequently underwent extensive firepower and mobility trials in the UK which were completed early in 1997.
  - Royal Ordnance ROMOR-A explosive reactive armour or Vickers Defence Systems VARMA Series 2 explosive reactive armor on the forward portions of the hull and turret.
  - All-electric, solid state gun control system provided by SIG of Switzerland.
  - Avimo NVL 3200 or Pilkington Optronics Falcon day/thermal sights, with a remote display for the commander.
  - Officine Galileo modular day/night panoramic periscopic
  - Global Positioning System (GPS) receiver
  - Avimo LIRD-2 laser warning system coupled to a bank of eight 76 mm grenade launchers
  - Bustle-mounted air conditioning system
- Mark 3 AVLB : The Vickers AVLB has been designed to transport, launch and recover a scissors bridge with a length of 13.41 m and to provide a clear span of military bridges of class MLC 60/70. The bridge is carried in the horizontal position and launched hydraulically through 180° over the front of the vehicle.
- Mark 3 ARV/ARRV : The ARV was proposed with or without a crane (4,000 kg lifting capacity) for changing complete powerpacks in the field and is provided with a main capstan winch with a nominal direct line pull of 25 t working in conjunction with the anchor spade mounted at the front of the hull. The pull can be increased to 65 t by multi-reeving of the rope using the recovery equipment including pulleys, cables and tow bars. Loaded weight, without a spare powerpack is 36.8 t and armament comprises a 7.62 mm cupola-mounted machine-gun and smoke dischargers.

== Operators ==
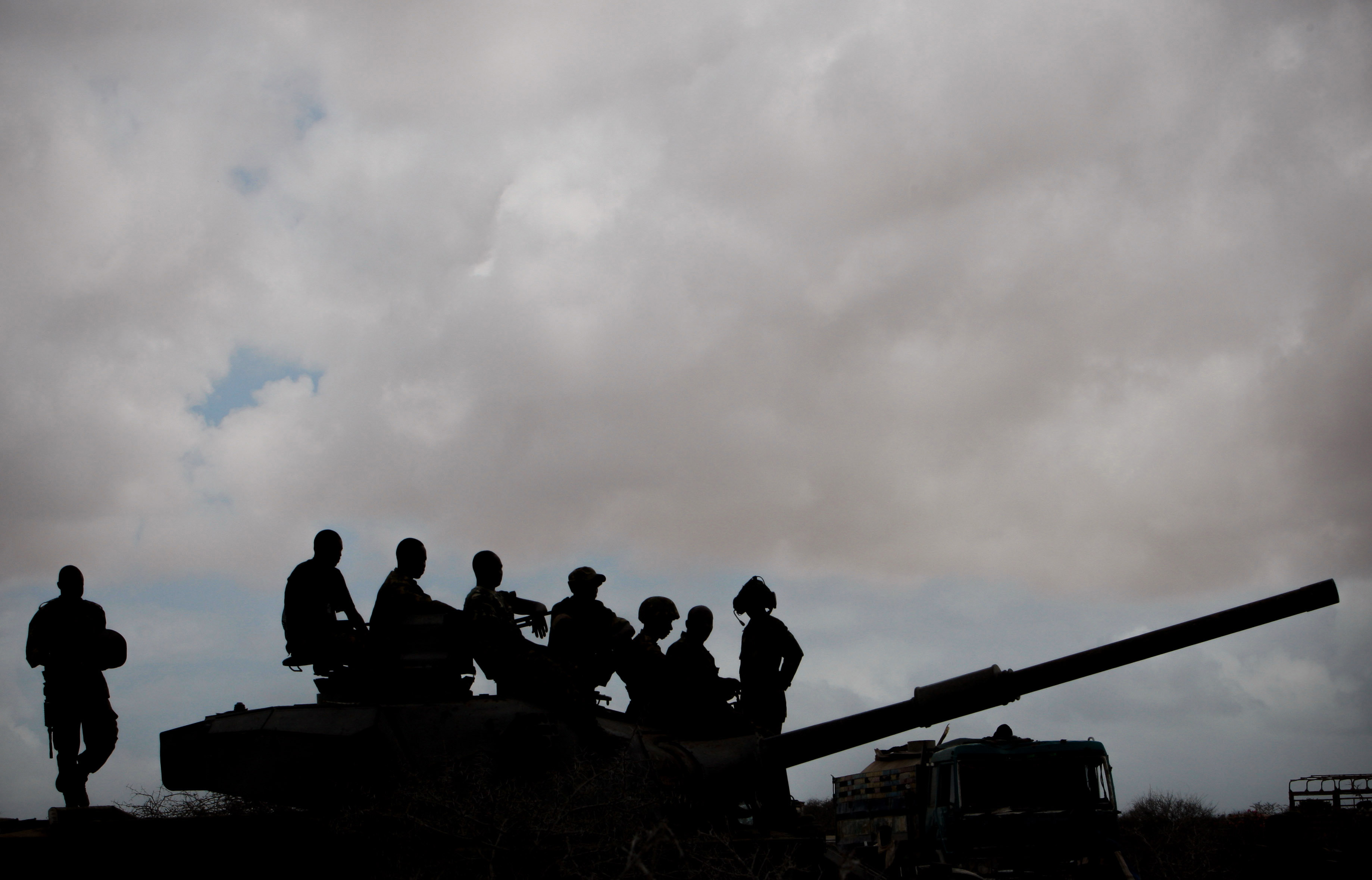
Silhouette of Kenyan troops on top of a Vickers Mark 3 outside of Kismayo, Somalia in 2012

- Kenya - 76 MBT Mk 3 and 7 ARV delivered in 1979–1982
- Nigeria - 136 MBT Mk 3, 12 ARV and 26 AVLB delivered in 1983–1995
- Tanzania - 4 ARV delivered in 1989

=== Former operators ===
- Boko Haram - Few Nigerian Mk 3 were captured, later they were knocked out or recaptured by Nigerian Army.

=== Failed bids ===
- Malaysia - Vickers Mk 3(M) was developed for export to Malaysia in 1990s, but never saw serial production. Malaysia later opted for PT-91M Pendekar.

== See also ==
- Vickers MBT Mk. 1 (predecessor)
- Vickers MBT Mk. 4 (successor)
- AMX-32 (French export counterpart)
