= Kenya Army =

Land warfare branch of the Kenya Defence Forces

Kenyan Army
- Jeshi la Nchi Kavu
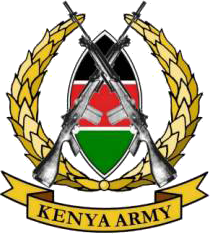
- Emblem of the Kenya Army
- Founded: 1964
- Country: Kenya
- Part of: Kenya Defence Forces
- Headquarters: Waterworks Camp, Hurlingham, Nairobi, Kenya
- Motto: "Ngao Ya Taifa"
- Engagements: Second World War (as King's African Rifles); Shifta War (1963–67); Mount Elgon insurgency (2005-08); Operation Linda Nchi (2011–12); African Union Mission to Somalia (2012–2022); African Union Transition Mission in Somalia (2022-2024); Kivu Conflict
- Website: mod.go.ke/kenya-army/

Commanders
- Commander-in-Chief: President William Ruto
- Commander, Kenya Army: Lieutenant General David Kipkemboi Ketter

Insignia
- Flag

The Kenya Army is the land arm of the Kenya Defence Forces.

== History ==
The origins of the present day Kenya Army can be traced back to the British Army's King's African Rifles. In the last quarter of the 19th Century, the British began actively enforcing the abolition of the slave trade in East Africa. Concurrently, other European nations were establishing spheres of influence in Africa. To safeguard British interests, the Imperial British East Africa Company was established. As these interests developed and expanded, a more formidable force became necessary, (to safeguard these interests and expansion), leading to the creation of the first British land forces in Kenya.

In June 1873 the Sultan of Zanzibar, Barghash bin Said of Zanzibar, signed the final treaty to abolish slave trade throughout his territories. Enforcing the abolition became the task of the Royal Navy; within three weeks Admiral Arthur Cumming, Commander-in-Chief, East Indies, arrived at Zanzibar. In 1877 a Royal Navy officer, Lieutenant Lloyd Matthews, serving on HMS London formed a small force of 300 Zanzibaris to combat the slave trade. In 1878 Lieutenant Matthews was given leave to serve under the Sultan who appointed him Brigadier General in command of the newly established force. By 1880 the force had grown to 1300 men who were all armed with Snider rifles donated to the Sultan by the British Government.

On 8 September 1888 the Imperial British East Africa Company was granted a royal charter and was charged with the responsibility of administering British East Africa on the lines of a Crown colony. In 1893 the three-year contract with the Indian contingent came to an end. During the same period the company was experiencing serious financial problems that had led to the abandonment of Uganda and Jubaland in fact, the company could barely police the coast. The then British Consul in Zanzibar, Sir Arthur Hardinge, notified the Foreign Office of his intention of taking over East Africa from the company. The British government accepted. On 1 July 1895 a British protectorate was declared over all the areas previously administered by the company. The company troops were subsequently reorganized under Captain Hatch.

In August 1895 the British government sanctioned the establishment of a force composed of 300 Punjabi, 300 Swahili, 100 Sudanese, and 200 soldiers from various ethnic groups in the region. This force was renamed the East African Rifles and was formed from the former Imperial British East Africa Company force in Mombasa (Fort Jesus).

Before the Second World War, British colonial forces in Kenya, the now-King's African Rifles, in the main, were small:

There was no conscription and the army was extremely selective, recruiting soldiers from ethnic groups with supposedly inherent military qualities, the so-called "martial races." In the 1920s and 1930s, martial races included the Kamba, Kalenjin, and Somali, pastoral semi-pastoral groups from impoverished regions. In contrast, Kikuyu and Meru of central Kenya were hardly found in the army. The Second World War brought a massive expansion of military personnel. From an interwar strength of less than 1,000 men, the armed forces increased to 75,000 by 1943. Thus, every tenth adult man was serving in the military, representing about 20 percent of the wage labor force. The huge demand for able-bodied and skilled men was met by extending the recruitment pool to communities the British did not consider martial. Additionally, the military offered wages above civilian levels. In 1941 the pay ranged between 17 and 60 shillings per month for a newly trained private in the East African Military Labour Service and East African Army Service Corps respectively, whereas civil wages for unskilled labor averaged between 8 and 12 shillings.22 The military offered additional pulls such as uniforms, housing, food, professional training, and promotion.

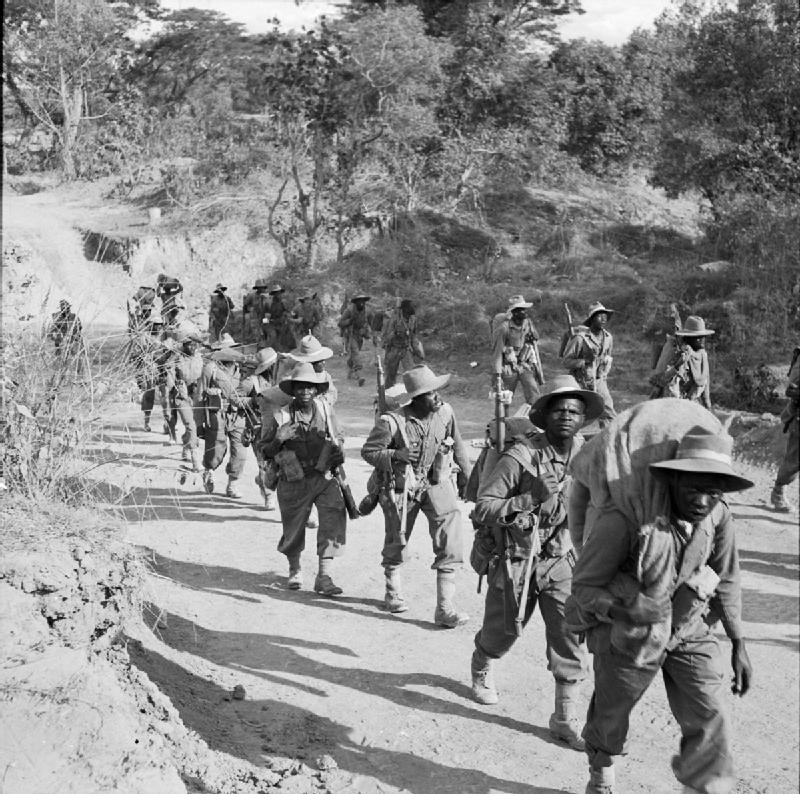
Troops of 11th (East Africa) Division on the road to Kalewa, Burma, during the Chindwin River crossing

As part of the King's African Rifles, indigenous soldiers from Kenya Colony fought in several campaigns during World War II. They fought against the Italians in Italian East Africa during the East African Campaign, against the Vichy French in Madagascar during the Battle of Madagascar, and against the Japanese in Burma during the Burma Campaign. Initially, the KAR was deployed as the 1st East African Infantry Brigade and the 2nd East African Infantry Brigade. The first brigade was responsible for coastal defence and the second for the defence of the interior. By the end of July 1940, two additional East African brigades were formed, the 3rd East African Infantry Brigade and the 6th East African Infantry Brigade. Initially a Coastal Division and a Northern Frontier District Division were planned, but, instead, the 11th African Division and the 12th African Division was formed.

The two divisions included East African, Ghanaian, Nigerian, and South African troops. A Nigerian brigade, together with two East African brigades (the King's African Rifles brigades) and some South Africans, formed the 11th African Division. The 12th African Division was similarly formed, but with the Ghanaian brigade instead of the Nigerian brigade. The 11th African Division was disbanded in November 1941 and the 12th African Division was disbanded in April 1943. In 1943, the 11th (East Africa) Division was formed and it fought in Burma. In addition, two independent infantry brigades were sent from East Africa to India for service in Burma. The 22 (East Africa) Infantry Brigade served in the Arakan under command of XV Indian Corps, while the 28th (East Africa) Infantry Brigade served under IV Corps, playing a crucial role in the crossing of the Irrawaddy River.

=== Mau Mau Uprising and independence ===
The KAR fought against the Mau Mau rebels under the command of British officers in the 1950s and on the side of loyalist Kenyans and those who advocated a peaceful transition to independence, such as Jomo Kenyatta. KAR battalions listed included 3 KAR (Kenya), 4 KAR (Uganda), 5 KAR (Kenya), 6 KAR (Tanganiyka), 7 & 23 KARs (Kenya), 26 KAR (Tanganyika).

As stipulated in the Kenya Military Forces (Naming of Units) Order 1964, 3 Battalion KAR, 5 Battalion KAR, 11 Battalion KAR, three attached training companies, Headquarters 70th (East African) Infantry Brigade, 1 Signal Squadron, 91 General Transport Company, workshops, and a variety of other Combat service support units were handed over to the new Kenya Army during the process of independence for Kenya in December 1963 and January 1964.

Kenyan authorities quickly began considering a parachute capability. "On October 14, 1964, the first batch of 40.. were sent to Britain for Parachute Basic Training course" at RAF Abingdon. Similar numbers ..followed until about 200 Kenyan troops qualified to form the 1st Independent Parachute Company on April 24, 1965."

In 1977 (probably during the Ogaden War) a Somali force crossed the border into northern Kenya. The same year Kenya placed an order with Vickers Defence Systems in the UK for 38 Vickers Main Battle Tank Mark 3 main battle tanks plus three armoured recovery vehicles (ARVs) which were all delivered by 1980, forming Kenya's initial tank battalion. Another order was placed in December 1980 for a further 38 Mark 3s, plus four ARVs, which were all completed at the works, if not delivered, by December 1982.

After Kenya invaded Somalia in Operation Linda Nchi in 2011, 6 Brigade became "fully fledged" in 2012. 6 Brigade was installed on the outskirts of Garissa town after Modika Barracks there was "launched" by President Uhuru Kenyatta on Friday 13 December 2019. Also moved there from Embakasi in Nairobi was 17 Kenya Rifles ("One Seven"). The other battalions of the brigade were 19 KR at Nyali Barracks just north of Mombasa and 21 KR at Mariakani Barracks.

By 2021, the International Institute for Strategic Studies listed 31 Type-92 wheeled armoured personnel carriers and 105 South African PUMA M26-15 Protected patrol vehicles in service.

On 1 May 2021, The Nation wrote that about 1,600 Army troops drawn from 20th Para, 30 Special Forces, and the Long Range Surveillance unit of the Directorate of Military Intelligence, would be dispatched to serve with MONUSCO [in the Democratic Republic of the Congo], with second rotation replacements coming from "the American-trained 40 Rangers Strike Force (40RSF), the Special Boat unit of the Kenya Navy and the Clearance Diving Unit," while the "newly formed Marine Commandos" also expected to be sent at some point. Congolese President Tshisekedi said "Kenya will voluntarily be part of the Rapid Intervention Brigade." The Kenyan contingent was "expected to replace South African troops.. and will be working alongside soldiers from Nepal." "A majority of the Kenyan soldiers will be part of MONUSCO."

== Peacekeeping missions ==
Kenya Army involvement in international peacekeeping, Peace Support Operations was first considered in 1973. That year the United Nations requested Kenya to contribute forces to UNEF II which was to separate Israel and the Arab states after the October War. Though Kenya acceded to the UN request, the troops were not deployed.

Kenya's first actual participation in Peace Support Operations was in 1979, when the Commonwealth requested the Republic of Kenya to contribute troops for the Commonwealth Monitoring Force in Rhodesia (now Zimbabwe). The Monitoring Force supervised the arrival and cantonment of the rebel Zimbabwe African National Liberation Army and Zimbabwe People's Revolutionary Army (ZIPRA) forces, and included 51 Kenya Army personnel under Colonel Jack Munyao who ran one of the 14 Assembly Points.

Subsequently, the Kenya Army contributed officers towards operations in Chad in 1982 on the request of the Organization of African Unity. In 1989 the Army sent military observers and an infantry battalion to the United Nations Transitional Assistance Group (UNTAG) in Namibia. Kenya has ranked number 6 out of the 90 countries who contribute military and civilian police to the UN operations.

Since 1989, Kenya has contributed military observers, staff officers, civilian police monitors, and infantry troops to various missions. Force commanders, chief military observers, and chiefs of staff have also been sent to the following UN and African Union missions:

- United Nations Observer Mission in Liberia (Liberia) – Chief Military Observer
- United Nations Mission in Liberia - Major General Leonard Ngondi was appointed Force Commander in December 2012.
- ONUMOZ in Mozambique – Chief Military Observer
- United Nations Transitional Assistance Group in Namibia – then Brigadier Daniel Ishmael Opande was appointed Deputy Force Commander
- United Nations Protection Force (UNPROFOR) in the Federal Republic of Yugoslavia – Chief Military Observer
- UNMOP (Croatia) – Chief Military Observer

A varierty of senior personnel have also served with the related warfighting mission AMISOM in Somalia.

To date, Kenyan United Nations peacekeepers have served in 16 different countries in Africa, the Middle East, the Balkans, and Asia. The period of deployment of the personnel has varied from mission to mission, in accordance with the complexities of each conflict situation. Missions have ranged from one to eight years. After the invasion of Somalia in Operation Linda Nchi in 2011, Kenya Army troops have been involved in heavy fighting against Al-Shabaab since. Incorporated into the AU-led AMISOM in 2012, Kenyan troops have been in Somalia since - an ongoing total of 13 years.

== Commanders of the Kenya Army ==
On 9th of March, 2024 Lieutenant General David Kimaiyo Chemwaina Tarus MGH, MBS, OGW was sworn in as the new Kenya army commander and is currently the Kenya army commander. He had previous served as the deputy service commander of the Kenya Army under then Kenya army commander, LIEUTENANT GENERAL Peter Mbogo Njiru MGH CBS ‘rcds’ (UK) ‘psc’ (K) who was famed for being a former aide de camp to former president Uhuru Muigai Kenyatta.

== Structure ==
The Kenya Army is made up of various formations and services. These formations and services are divided between two operational commands, the Western Command (WestCom) headquartered in Lanet and Eastern Command (EastCom) based at Embakasi Garrison. The Eastern Command was established in 1997 and its role is to defend the Eastern region of Kenya against external and internal threats. These areas include the capital itself and the former Central, Eastern, North Eastern and Coast provinces. Western Command is tasked with defending the Western region of the country and includes the former Rift Valley, Western and Nyanza provinces. In recent times there have been plans to set up a Nairobi Metropolitan Command for the capital and the surrounding metropolitan area of Machakos County, Kiambu County and Kajiado County. This realignment would have Eastern Command relocated to Garissa but it remains unclear whether Nairobi Metropolitan Command was established.

By 2020 Border Protection Command was active at Wajir under General Officer Commanding, Major General William Shume. In July 2021 Shume became Deputy Commander Kenya Army and Brigadier Stephen Otieno was promoted to major-general and took over as GOC BSC.

== Kenyan Army Formations ==
- 2 Brigade
  - 3rd Battalion, Kenya Rifles. This is Kenya's oldest unit which dates back to the 1880s. They are based in Lanet, Nakuru. Their Colour is red and their motto is 'Red Scarlets'
  - 5th Kenya Rifles. Based in Gilgil, their colour is Dark Blue. Their unit motto is 'Fighting Five'
  - 9 Kenya Rifles - Moi Barracks, Eldoret. Their colour is Orange. Their unit motto is 'Orangers fire and war machines'. Winner of end-year foot and drill competition 2020.
  - 21 Transport Company
  - 22 Field Workshop
  - 23 Ordnance Company
- 4 Brigade Current Brigade Commander is Brigadier Lukas Kutto.
  - 1st Battalion, Kenya Rifles. Based in Nanyuki, Their motto is 'Green Fire' and their colour is Green.
  - 7 Kenya Rifles - Langata Barracks, Nairobi. Their colour is Maroon and their unit motto is 'Maroon Commandos' and 'Man to man I am the best'
  - 15th Kenya Rifles. Formed in the early 1990s. It has been based in the coastal region of the country. currently housed at Mariakani Barracks. Their colour is Blue and the unit motto is 'Stay High'.
  - 41 Transport Company
  - 42 Field Workshop
  - 43 Ordnance Company
- 6 Brigade - formed by 2010 - relocated from Embakasi to Modika Barracks, Garissa.
  - 17 Kenya Rifles - Formed in 2011 and in late 2018 stationed at Modika. They are known as the 'Desert Rangers' and their colour is purple. They initially used desert brown as their colour, which was changed to new, purple colours during the 2018 Jamhuri Day ceremonies.
  - 19 Kenya Rifles - Nyali Barracks. Also known as the 'Ash Warriors'. Their unit colour is Ash Grey and formally received their Presidential and Regimental Colours during the 2021 Jamhuri Day ceremonies at Uhuru Gardens.
  - 21 Kenya Rifles - Mariakani Barracks but they will soon move to Manda Bay in Lamu to join the Kenya Navy in proving security in that area and especially Boni Forest.
  - 61 Transport Company
  - 62 Field Workshop
  - 63 Ordnance Company
- 8 Brigade (Brigadier David Chesire was named commandant of the brigade in August 2022)
  - 23 Mechanised Infantry Battalion (23 MIB) who formally received their Presidential and regimental colours during the 2022 Jamhuri Day celebrations at Nyayo National Stadium.
  - 25 MIB (Mechanised Infantry Battalion) who officially received their Presidential and regimental colours during the 2023 Jamhuri Day celebrations at Uhuru Gardens, Nairobi. They will be based in Baragoi, in Samburu County.
  - 27 MIB (Mechanised Infantry Battalion)
  - 31 MIB (Mechanised Infantry Battalion)
- 110 Brigade
- 112 Brigade
- Army Special Operations Brigade (Kenya) - in 2020 under the command of Colonel John Njeru
  - 20th Parachute Battalion (20 Paras)
  - 40th Ranger Regiment (40RR)
  - 60th Army Special Battalion (60ASB)
  - Special Operations Training School (SOTS)
- Kenya Army Artillery Brigade
  - 66 Artillery Battalion
  - 75 Artillery Battalion (Air Defence)
  - 77 Artillery Battalion
  - 88 Artillery Battalion
  - School of Artillery
- Kenya Army Armoured Brigade
  - 76 Armoured Recce Battalion (ARB)
  - 78 Tank Battalion
  - 81 Tank Battalion
  - 86 Armoured Recce Battalion (ARB)
  - 91 Tank Battalion
  - School Of Armour
- Kenya Army Engineers Brigade
  - 10 Engineers Battalion
  - 12 Engineers Battalion
  - Disaster Response Battalion
  - School of Combat Engineering (SOCE)
- Kenya Army Corps of Signals (KACS)
  - AHQ Signal Battalion
  - School of Signals
- 1st Canine-K9 Regiment
- Directorate of Military Intelligence (Kenya)
  - Military Intelligence Corps
  - Long Range Surveillance Group
  - School of Military Intelligence
- Joint Helicopter Command (Kenya) - replaced the disbanded 50 Air Cavalry Battalion

== Kenyan Army services ==
- Kenya Army Ordnance Corps
  - Defence Forces Ordnance Depot (DFOD)
  - 2nd Ordnance Battalion
  - School of Ordnance (SOO)
- Kenya Army Corps of Transport (KACT)
  - Transport Battalion
  - Heavy Lift Battalion
  - School of Transport (SOT)
- Kenya Army Corps of Electrical and Mechanical Engineering (KACEME)

This Corps mainly deals with maintenance of motor and mechanical equipment that is used in the Kenya Army. It is based at Kahawa Garrison along Thika Road.

  - Workshop Battalion
  - School of Electrical and Mechanical Engineering (SEME)
- Military Police Corps (MPC) - based at the Defence Headquarters along Lenana Road Nairobi
  - 1 MP battalion
  - 2 MP battalion
  - School of Military Police (SOMP)
- Kenya Army Medical Corps (KAMC)
  - Medical Battalion
- Kenya Army Corps of Education (KACE)
- Defence Forces Constabulary (DFC)
- Strategic Communications (STRATCOMM)

Training institutions include the Kenya Military Academy, and the Recruits Training School (Kenya), located 22 kilometres from Eldoret Town, Uasin Gishu County.

== Equipment ==
The acquisition of T-72s has caused significant controversy. Thirty-three vehicles ordered from Ukraine were hijacked by Somali pirates. The Ukrainian Defence Minister Yury Yekhanurov confirmed 33 Soviet-made T-72 tanks and "a substantial quantity of ammunition" were aboard the captured cargo ship, called the Faina". The ship they were being carried in, MV Faina was released and the tanks unloaded in the port city of Mombasa in February 2009. There have been doubts expressed as to whether the T-72s imported by Kenya are intended for use by the Kenyan Army. Instead, popular opinion is that they were being clandestinely imported for the (South) Sudan People's Liberation Army, which has an arms embargo against it.

The KDF attempted to dispel speculation by publicly showing these tanks (and other hardware) as part of its arsenal on 22 August 2010, during rehearsals for the passing of the new Constitution of Kenya. Nevertheless, a cloud of doubt hung over the intent of the tank acquisition. The United States diplomatic cables leak indicated that an ongoing process of armaments purchases on behalf of the Southern Sudanese government by the Kenyan government was "a badly kept secret." The leaks go on to speculate that these clandestine operations were motivated by the Kenya political leadership's desire to support Southern Sudan, but not in a way that would openly provoke Khartoum or potentially threaten South Sudan's eventual independence.

The KDF was supposedly interested in the US Army-approved version of the Multiple Integrated Laser Engagement System (MILES) combat simulation system.

=== Small arms ===
Name	Image	Caliber	Type	Origin	Notes
Pistols
Browning Hi-Power		9×19mm	Semi-automatic pistol	Belgium	
Beretta 92		9×19mm	Semi-automatic pistol	Italy	
Glock 17		9×19mm	Semi-automatic pistol	Austria	
Glock 19		9×19mm	Semi-automatic pistol	Austria	
CZ-75		9×19mm	Semi-automatic pistol	Czechoslovakia	
Submachine guns
Sterling		9×19mm	Submachine gun	United Kingdom	
Uzi		9×19mm	Submachine gun	Israel	
Heckler & Koch MP5		9×19mm	Submachine gun	West Germany	
CZ Scorpion Evo 3		9×19mm	Submachine gun	Czech Republic	
Rifles
AKM		7.62×39mm	Assault rifle	Soviet Union	
Zastava M70		7.62×39mm	Assault rifle	Yugoslavia	
Vz. 58		7.62×39mm	Assault rifle	Czechoslovakia	
Type 56		7.62×39mm	Assault rifle	China	
M16		5.56×45 mm	Assault rifle	United States	
M4		5.56×45mm	Carbine Assault rifle	United States	
IWI Tavor		5.56×45mm	Bullpup Assault rifle	Israel	
FN SCAR		7.62×51mm NATO	Battle rifle	Belgium	1000
FN FAL		7.62×51mm	Battle rifle	Belgium	
Heckler & Koch G3		7.62×51mm	Battle rifle	West Germany	
Lee-Enfield		.303 British	Bolt-action rifle	British Empire	
Sniper rifles
IWI Galatz		7.62×51mm	Designated marksman rifle	Israel	
Machine guns
Bren		7.62×51mm	Light machine gun	United Kingdom	
IWI Negev		5.56×45mm	Light machine gun	Israel	
Browning M1919		7.62×51mm	Medium machine gun	United States	
PKM		7.62×54mmR	General-purpose machine gun	Soviet Union	
Heckler & Koch HK21		7.62×51mm	General-purpose machine gun	West Germany	
FN MAG		7.62×51mm	General-purpose machine gun	Belgium	
AA-52		7.62×51mm	General-purpose machine gun	France	
M60		7.62×51mm	General-purpose machine gun	United States	
DShK		12.7×108mm	Heavy machine gun	Soviet Union	
Browning M2		.50 BMG	Heavy machine gun	United States	
Grenade launchers
M203		40×46mm SR	Grenade launcher	United States	
M79		40×46mm	Grenade launcher	United States	

=== Anti-tank weapons ===
Name	Image	Type	Origin	Caliber	Notes
Carl Gustav		Recoilless rifle	Sweden	84mm	
MILAN		Anti-tank missile	France West Germany		483 in service.
BGM-71 TOW		Anti-tank missile	United States		

=== Vehicles ===
==== Tanks ====
Name	Image	Type	Origin	Quantity	Status	Notes
Vickers Mk.3		Main battle tank	United Kingdom	78		
T-72AV		Main battle tank	Soviet Union	110		77 T-72AV from Ukraine in 2007. 33 delivered in Feb 2009 may bring total to 110.

==== Reconnaissance ====
Name	Image	Type	Origin	Quantity	Status	Notes
Panhard AML-60/90		Armored car	France	72		
Alvis Saladin		Armored car	United Kingdom	10		
Shorland S52		Armored Car	United Kingdom	8		

==== Scout cars ====
Name	Image	Type	Origin	Quantity	Status	Notes
BOV M11		Scout car	Serbia	20		
Daimler Ferret		Armored car Scout car	United Kingdom	12		
BRDM-3		Armored car Scout car	Russia	8		

==== Armored personnel carriers ====
Name	Image	Type	Origin	Quantity	Status	Notes
UR-416		Armoured personnel carrier	West Germany	52		
Panhard M3		Armoured personnel carrier	France	10		
ACMAT Bastion		Armoured personnel carrier	France	12		
WZ-551		Armored personnel carrier	China	35		

==== Mine-Resistant Ambush Protected ====
Name	Image	Type	Origin	Quantity	Status	Notes
PUMA M26-15		MRAP	South Africa	150		
Katmerciler Hızır		MRAP	Turkey	118		

==== Engineering vehicles ====
Name	Image	Type	Origin	Quantity	Status	Notes
Vickers Mk.3 ARV		Armored recovery vehicle	United Kingdom	7		
Bozena-5		Mine clearing vehicle	Slovakia	Unknown		

==== Utility vehicles ====
Name	Image	Type	Origin	Quantity	Status	Notes
Humvee		Light utility vehicle	United States	8		
Land Rover Series IIA		Utility vehicle	United Kingdom	Unknown		
Land Rover Defender		Utility vehicle	United Kingdom	Unknown		
Trucks
KamAZ-6350		Utility truck	Russia	Unknown		
FMTV		Utility truck	United States	Unknown		
Mercedes-Benz Kurzhauber		Utility truck	West Germany	Unknown		
Mack R series		Utility truck	United States	Unknown		

=== Artillery ===
Name	Image	Type	Origin	Quantity	Status	Notes
Self-propelled artillery
Nora B-52		Self-propelled artillery	Serbia	18		
Mortars
MO-120-RT-61		Towed mortar	France	12		
Field artillery
L118		Field gun	United Kingdom	40		40 bought from United Kingdom during 1983-84.
M119		Field gun	United States	6		6 donated by the United States in 2019.
OTO Melara Mod 56		Howitzer	Italy	7		

=== Air defence ===
==== Towed anti-aircraft guns ====
Name	Image	Type	Origin	Quantity	Status	Notes
Bofors L/70		Autocannon	Sweden	13		

=== Aircraft ===
Model	Origin	Type	Number	Photo	Notes
Helicopters
MD 500 Defender	United States	Light attack / utility helicopter	47		South Korea donated 8 refurbished ones in October 2026
MD 530F Cayuse Warrior	United States	Light attack / utility helicopter	5		6 delivered in 2020, one crashed later that year
Z-9	China	Light attack helicopter	3		
Unmanned aerial vehicles
RQ-11 Raven	United States	Unmanned aerial vehicle	8		
ScanEagle	United States	Unmanned aerial vehicle	4		

== Ranks and Insignia ==
=== Officers ===
Rank group	General / flag officers					Senior officers			Junior officers
Kenya Army
Kenya Army	Commander-in-Chief	General	Lieutenant general	Major general	Brigadier	Colonel	Lieutenant colonel	Major	Captain	Lieutenant	Second lieutenant

=== Enlisted personnel ===
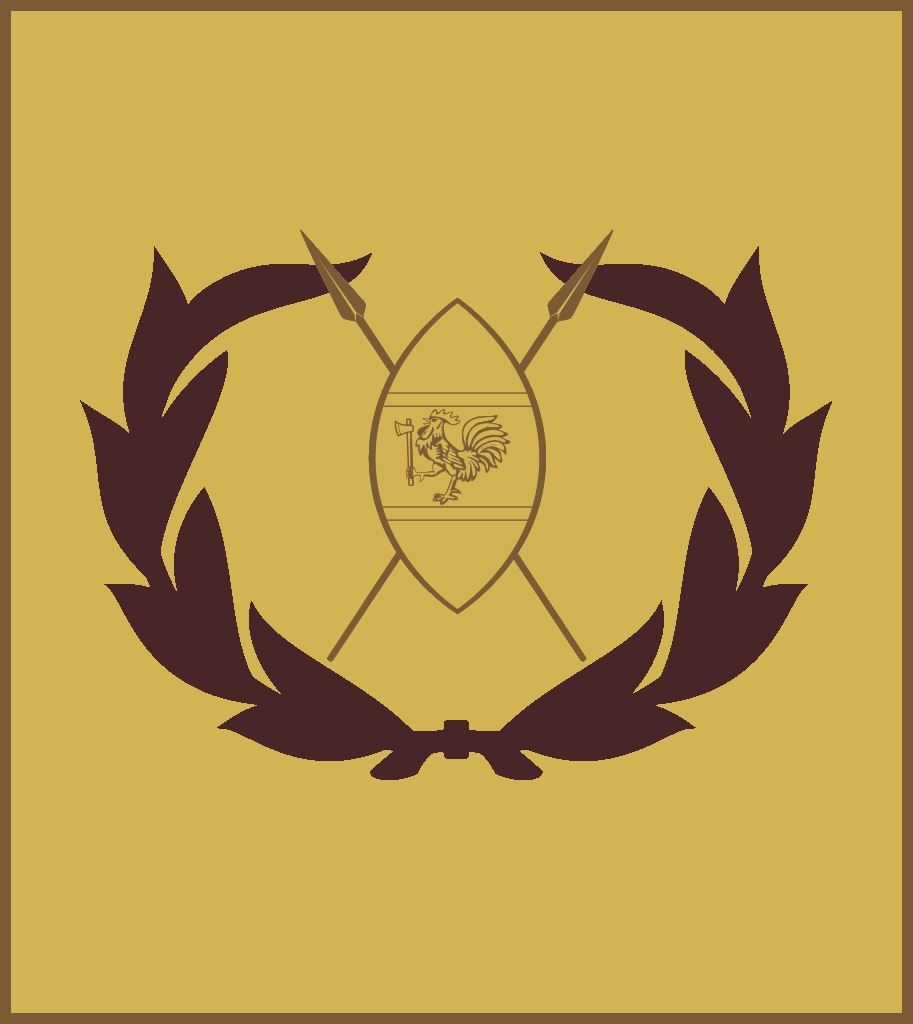
Rank group	Senior NCOs				Junior NCOs		Enlisted
Kenya Army							No insignia
Kenya Army	Warrant officer class 1	Warrant officer class 2	Senior sergeant	Sergeant	Corporal	Lance corporal	Private (or equivalent)

== Notes ==
- Foss, Christopher F. (1986). Jane's Main Battle Tanks (Second ed.). City Road, London: Jane's Publishing Company Limited. ISBN 0-7106-0372-X.
- Mwangi, Jonah; Wanjiku, Esther; Kimwele, Muthusi, eds. (2019). The Soldier's Legacy: The Kenya Army at 55: A Steadfast Shield from 1963 into Posterity. Woodlands Road, Nairobi: Kenya Army. ISBN 978-9966-804-32-7.
- International Institute for Strategic Studies (February 2021). The Military Balance 2021. Vol. 121. Routledge. ISBN 9781032012278.
