= Commander, Kenya Army =

Most senior officer in the Kenya Army

- Flag of Kenya Army

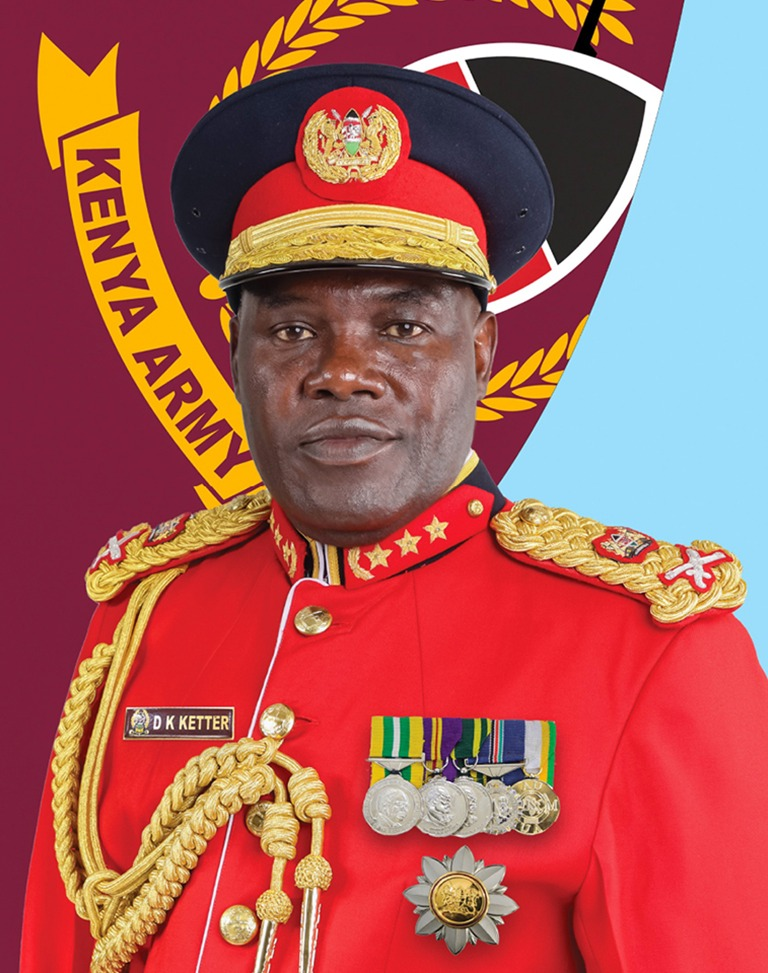
- Incumbent; David Kipkemboi Ketter since 27 June 2025
- Kenya Army
- Reports to: Chief of Defence Forces
- Appointer: The president
- Formation: 12 December 1963
- First holder: Ian Freeland
- Deputy: Deputy Army Commander

The commander, Kenya Army is the chief and highest-ranking officer of the Kenya Army The current commander is Lieutenant General David Kipkemboi Ketter.

== List of officeholders ==
No.	Portrait	Name (born–died)	Term of office			Ref.
No.	Portrait	Name (born–died)	Took office	Left office	Time in office	Ref.
1		Major General; Ian Freeland (1912–1979)	12 December 1963	30 April 1964	140 days	
2		Brigadier; A. J. Hardy	1 May 1964	30 November 1966	2 years, 213 days	
3		Brigadier; Joseph Musyimi Lele Ndolo	1 December 1966	31 May 1969	2 years, 181 days	
4		Major General; Jackson Kimeu Mulinge (1924–2014)	1 June 1969	22 November 1978	9 years, 144 days	
5		Major General; Joseph Kathuka Nzioka	1 December 1978	12 December 1979	1 year, 11 days	
6		Major General; John Malan Sawe	13 December 1979	2 January 1981	1 year, 20 days	
7		Major General; Mohamud Haji Barrow Mohammed	3 January 1981	14 December 1981	345 days	
8		Lieutenant General; John Malan Sawe	15 December 1981	27 February 1986	4 years, 74 days	
9		Lieutenant General; James Lelasian Lengees	28 February 1986	30 November 1993	7 years, 275 days	
10		Lieutenant General; Daudi Rerimoi Chepkonga Tonje	1 December 1993	22 June 1994	203 days	
11		Lieutenant General; Augustine K. Cheruiyot	28 June 1994	7 June 1998	3 years, 344 days	
12		Lieutenant General; Adan Abdullahi	9 June 1998	30 November 2000	2 years, 174 days	
13		Lieutenant General; Lazarus Kipkurui Sumbeiywo	1 December 2000	28 February 2003	2 years, 89 days	
14		Lieutenant General; Jeremiah Mutinda Kianga EGH, CBS, ndc (K), cgsc (USA)	1 March 2003	10 August 2005	2 years, 162 days	
15		Lieutenant General; Augostino Stephen Karanu Njoroge MGH, CBS, ndc (K), psc	10 August 2005	5 December 2008	3 years, 117 days	
16		Lieutenant General; Jackson Kiprono Tuwei	5 December 2008	30 November 2010	1 year, 360 days	
17		Lieutenant General; Njuki Mwaniki MGH, CBS, OGW, ndc (K), psc	30 November 2010	13 July 2011	225 days	
18		Lieutenant General; Joseph Kiptoo Kasaon MGH, CBS, DCO, ndc (K), psc, cgsc (USA) (born 1958)	13 July 2011	17 April 2015	3 years, 278 days	
19		Lieutenant General; Leonard Muriuki Ngondi MGH, CBS, OGW, ndc (K), psc (born 1959)	17 April 2015	22 September 2016	1 year, 158 days	
20		Lieutenant General; Robert Kariuki Kibochi EGH, CBS, ndc (K), psc (born 1959)	22 September 2016	13 July 2018	1 year, 294 days	
21		Lieutenant General; Walter Koipaton Raria MGH, CBS, OGW, ndc (K), psc	13 July 2018	20 July 2022	4 years, 7 days	
22		Lieutenant General; Peter Mbogo Njiru MGH, CBS rcds (UK) psc (K)	20 July 2022	8 March 2024	1 year, 232 days	
23		Lieutenant General; David Kimaiyo Chemwaina Tarus CBS ndc (K) cgsc (USA) psc (K)	9 March 2024	27 June 2025	1 year, 110 days	
