= 2006 Kenyan Air Force Harbin Y-12 crash =

2006 aviation accident in Kenya

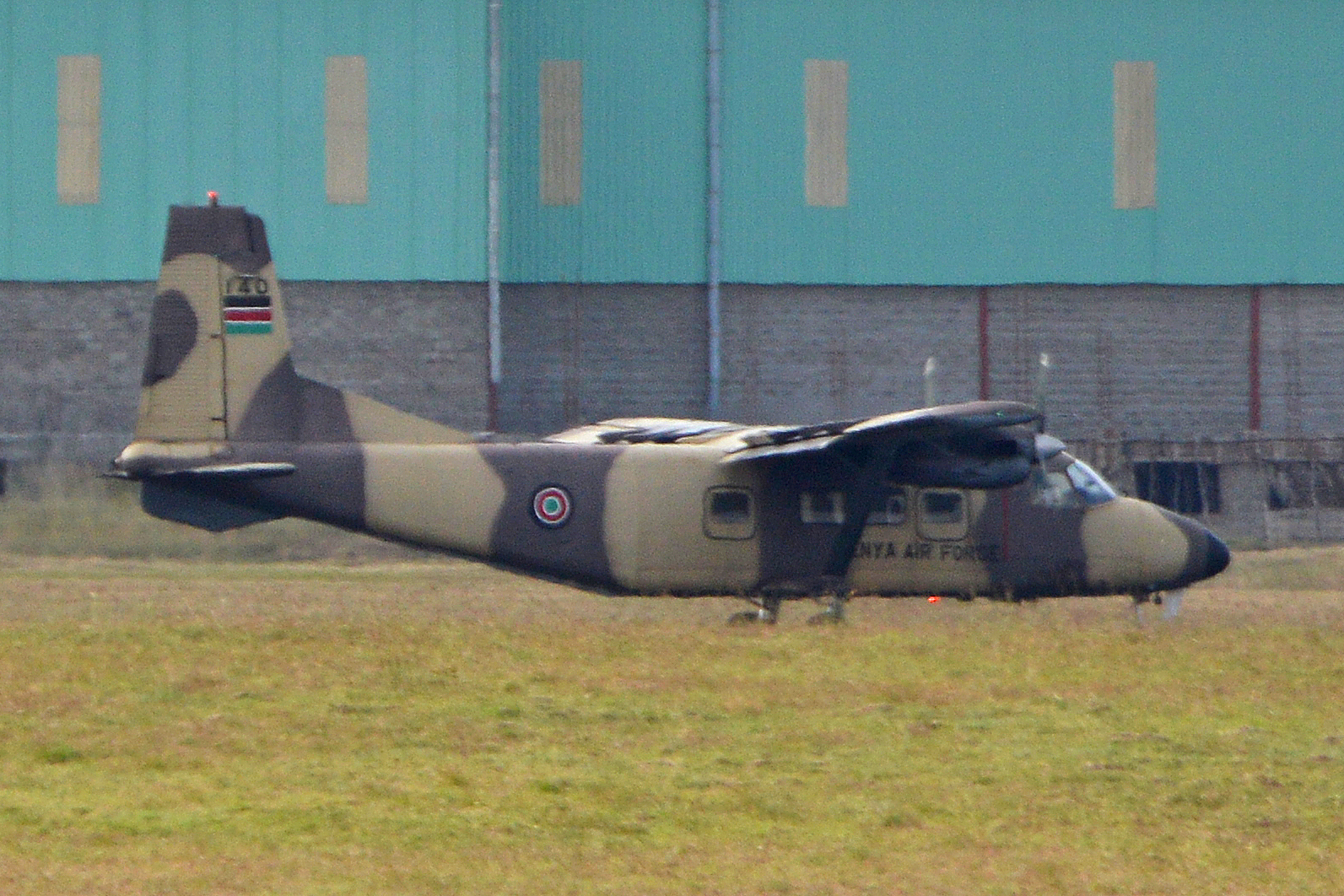
- A Kenyan Air Force Y-12, similar to the aircraft involved

Accident
- Date: 10 April 2006
- Summary: Controlled flight into terrain in bad weather
- Site: Mount Marsabit, Kenya; 2°18′47″N 38°01′14″E

Aircraft
- Aircraft type: Harbin Y-12 II
- Operator: Kenya Air Force
- Registration: 132
- Flight origin: Moi Air Base
- Destination: Marsabit airstrip
- Occupants: 17
- Passengers: 13
- Crew: 4
- Fatalities: 14
- Injuries: 3
- Survivors: 3

On 10 April 2006, a Kenya Air Force Harbin Y-12 II operating as Flight I-32, flying from Nairobi to Marsabit, Kenya, crashed into Mount Marsabit in bad weather as it was approaching Marsabit airstrip a second time after aborting its first attempt, killing 14 of the 17 occupants on board, including a number of politicians. The flight to the region was carrying a peace delegation meant to mediate regional feuds, which were exacerbated by a food crisis. In the aftermath of the accident, multiple politicians expressed their condolences, with three days of national mourning declared.

The crash was the deadliest aviation accident in Kenya since the crash of a Swearingen Metroliner in July 2003, killing all 14 occupants on board, and the first involving government officials since the crash of a Grumman Gulfstream I in January 2003.

An investigation led by the Kenyan Air Force concluded that poor visibility and bad weather led to the aircraft crashing into the volcano.

== Background ==
=== Purpose of the flight ===
Flight path of KAF132

The flight to the region, carrying a peace delegation, was meant to mediate regional feuds between the nomadic communities of the Borana, Gabra, and Rendille people at the Ethiopia–Kenya border. Incidents such as livestock rustling and inter-clan fighting left 90 people dead in 2005 alone; most notably from the Turbi massacre, on 12 July 2005, as a result of differences between the Gabra and Borana people, 1,000 people from the Borana armed with machetes and AK-47s had broken into a Gabra school in Turbi, killing around 90 people, including more than 20 children and 50 villagers, in addition to displacing 7,500 people.

In the months preceding the accident, additional tensions and fighting had broken out due to a scarcity of resources, including water, grazing land, and food, mostly caused by a food crisis in the region, which was exacerbated by the lack of winter rains for five consecutive seasons. Furthermore, militia groups suspected of being part of the Oromo Liberation Front (OLF), also accused of participating in the Turbi Massacre, were attacking Kenyans living along the border. Following "revenge attacks", the Government of Kenya sent reinforcements to the area. The Kenyan Government was accused of contributing to the region's tensions, among others in the country, citing corruption, its failure to equally and adequately distribute its resources, and secure conflict ridden districts.

The planned peace talks, which were scheduled to be held at Marsabit's Pastoral Centre, represented the first time that the leaders of the Borana, Gabra, and Rendille people had agreed to initiate peace talks and come up with a comprehensive peace program after years of hostilities. Local church leaders had tried to reduce the ongoing tensions, albeit with mixed success. Kenyan President Mwai Kibaki stated that Mirugi Kariuki, a Member of Parliament (MP) and assistant minister of Internal Security, "personally told me that it was a challenge to see what it is that makes these people not be friends, and he was determined to have them reconcile".

=== Aircraft and crew ===
The aircraft involved in the accident, manufactured in 2000, was a six-year-old twin-engine turboprop Harbin Y-12 II registered as 132. The aircraft had 1,032 hours of flying time and was last serviced in February 2006, and was reportedly always serviced according to schedule. According to military spokesman Bogita Ongeri and General Staff Daudi Tonje, the aircraft was properly maintained and had not experienced any issues. It was one of six Harbin Y-12s to be imported from China in July 2000, during a ceremony held at Moi Air Base, with the aircraft involved being delivered on 10 July 2000.

The Harbin Y-12, whose development began in 1980, is a 17-seat twin propeller light multi-purpose STOL aircraft that is produced by the Chinese Harbin Aircraft Manufacturing Corporation. At the time of the accident, the aircraft had already been certified in dozens of countries and was awaiting certification in countries such as France and Canada.

The crew consisted of the pilot-in-command, Major David Macharia Njoroge, who had more than 2,000 hours of flying experience and was promoted to the rank of Major the year before, having joined the Kenyan Army in July 1997, the co-pilot, Captain Joseph Njogu Muriithi, Senior Sergeant and Air Force flight engineer Joseph Muriithi, and Senior Private Trevor Mwamunge. Joseph Muriithi and Trevor Mwamunge were both seated at the back of the plane.

== Accident ==
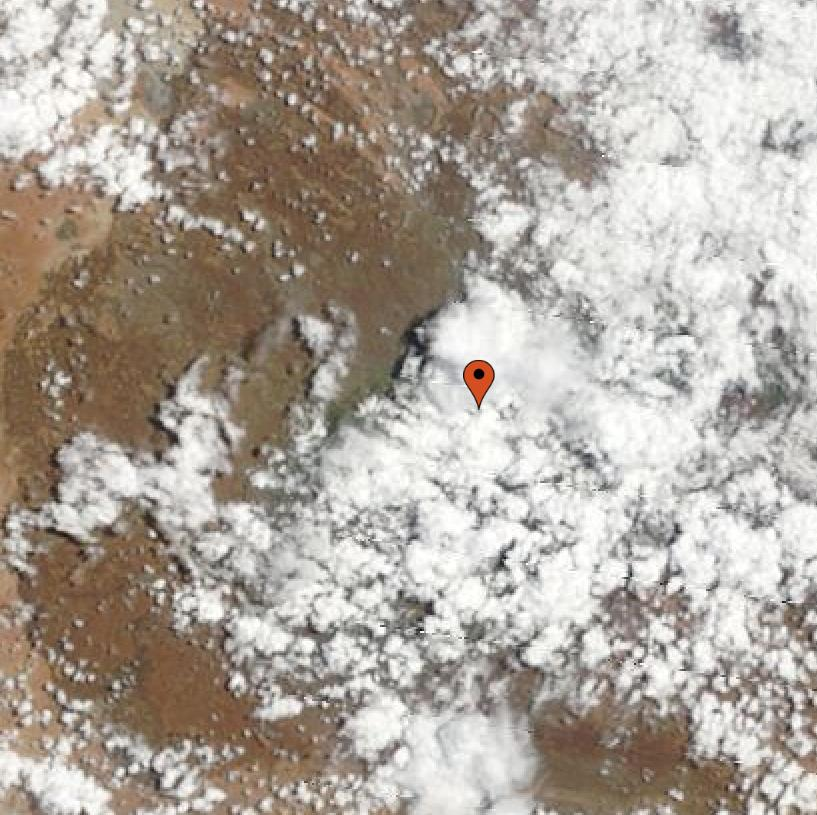
Mount Marsabit on the day of the crash (crash site pinpointed)

The aircraft, operating as Flight I-32, was scheduled to fly from Moi Air Base, Nairobi, to Marsabit airstrip. Journalists were to accompany the flight but were declined by a senior government official. The passengers were at the airport by 06:00 am. At 09:00 am local time, the aircraft took off from Moi Air Base. According to the Kenya Meteorology Department, weather at Marsabit was expected to include rainy and misty conditions. As the flight approached the airstrip, the pilot-in-command decided to abort the landing due to the presence of heavy fog and proceeded to circle around Marsabit. At around 10 am, as the pilots attempted a second approach, the flight crashed into Mount Marsabit in the Marsabit National Park, 3 kilometres (1.9 mi) away from the airstrip. The aircraft broke into two and burst into flames.

A local resident stated that there was a big fire and that only the tail and small parts of the wings were left unburnt. Four occupants were thrown out of the aircraft when it crashed. Out of the 17 occupants on board, 4 passengers initially survived the accident being seriously injured, but 1, Peter King'ola, later succumbed to his injuries while being transported to a hospital in Nairobi. All three survivors were seated at the back of the aircraft. Marsabit district commissioner Mutea Iringo stated that "The fire was very intense and there is no way anyone else could have survived." Joseph Mureithi, one of the survivors, stated: "I was unconscious for a few minutes, but all of a sudden, I regained consciousness. I did not know where I was and the first thing I asked myself is, who has stepped on me? I only realised later that my left leg was broken...".

Member of Parliament and former Minister of Foreign Affairs, Bonaya Godana, and Anglican Assistant bishop of Kirinyaga William Waqo died in the crash.

The crash was the deadliest aviation accident in Kenya since the crash of a Swearingen SA226-TC Metro II on Mount Kenya on 19 July 2003, killing all 14 occupants on board, and was the first aviation accident involving government officials since the crash of a Grumman G-159 Gulfstream I on 24 January 2003, killing 3 of the 12 occupants on board, including Labour Minister Ahmed Khalif and the two pilots, Abdikadir Mahat and Samuel Mungai. The survivors included ministers Martha Karua, Jubilee Party Secretary General Raphael Tuju, and former minister Linah Kilimo, among other dignitaries.

== Aftermath ==
=== Recovery efforts ===
As part of the rescue and recovery missions, the Kenyan government sent two planes to assist in the efforts, with the Kenya Wildlife Service also sending a plane to evacuate the injured. The government also sent a search and rescue team. Speaking to Agence France-Presse, Farid Abdulkadir, head of disaster operations for the Kenya Red Cross Society stated that "Of those who were on board, we only managed to take four people to hospital – It was a very bad crash. We are trying to get body bags there. – My workers on the ground are trying to pull out bodies from the wreckage."

On 11 April, it was reported that plans to bury two of the victims were abandoned as pathologists had difficulties in identifying the bodies. By 12 April, Chief Government pathologist Moses Njue had managed to identify seven out of thirteen bodies. By 13 April, it was reported that all of the bodies had been identified. Later on, all the victims' bodies were flown to Nairobi for further analysis and identification. The Kenyan Government paid for all the funeral expenses of the 14 victims of the crash.

=== Reactions ===
Kenya's President, Mwai Kibaki, issued a statement appealing for calm and prayers, adding that he had received the news with shock and disbelief, especially since the delegation of officials onboard the plane were headed to a peace mission in Marsabit. He also wished the injured survivors a quick recovery. Kenyan Vice President Moody Awori called the crash "a national tragedy". Three days of national mourning were declared by Mwai Kibaki. Ethiopian President Girma Wolde-Giorgis, Prime Minister Meles Zenawi and Foreign Minister Seyoum Mesfin expressed their condolences. In an editorial published by opposition newspaper Kenya Times on 11 April, the Kenyan leaders who had been killed in the crash were characterized as "martyrs of peace".

The Speaker of the National Assembly of Kenya, Francis ole Kaparo, announced that Parliamentary activities were adjourned until the funeral of the victims was over. This was the second time that the Parliament was disrupted by the death of a Minister of Parliament; the first time being in 1975 when Josiah Mwangi Kariuki was murdered. The National Assembly of the Republic of Kenya observed a one-minute silence. Multiple Kenyan politicians expressed their condolences. Kenyan members of parliament "called for unity of purpose among leaders in providing lasting peace and tranquility to Kenyans."

Dawud Ibsa Ayana, the chairman of the Oromo Liberation Front, expressed his condolences "on behalf of [him]self and [his] organization; the Oromo Liberation Front, and the Oromo people on the tragic plane accident that took the lives of those outstanding Kenyan public leaders...". Speaking to mourners at All Saints' Cathedral, Nairobi, Mwai Kibaki stated, "I personally have felt the loss of Mirugi immensely because I thought of him as a person who would do the work". Rhoda Siang'a, the wife of Gilbert Siang'a, stated: "Were it not for insecurity in the northern region of the country, my husband would not be dead. What a shame that he died in the process of brokering peace 40 years after independence."

The accident dealt a major blow to peace efforts in the region. A United Nations official stated that it would be difficult to be able to find new individuals who would have the same level of influence and expertise as those in the peace delegation. Marc Cassady, an advisor to Parliament, stated, "These were the powerbrokers of this part of Kenya," adding that, "Essentially, this wiped out a regional political class." All sitting MPs from the districts of Marsabit and Moyale were killed in the crash. Public concern about the country's air safety arose following the accident, considering that two plane crashes involving senior members of the government occurred in less than three years. The crash is considered one of the most devastating aviation accidents in Kenya's history.

On 12 April, Kibaki ordered a crackdown on crime, stating at a funeral service for seven of the victims that "All the state machinery will be mobilised to crack down on criminals who have been engaging in cattle rustling".

== Investigation ==
Shortly after the accident, a body of inquiry was established. The accident was investigated by the Kenyan Air Force, joined by representatives of the Harbin Aircraft Manufacturing Corporation, as they were the manufacturer of the aircraft involved. Chief of the General Staff, Jeremiah Kianga, was tasked with leading the investigation. Detectives of the Criminal Investigation Department (CID), headed by Iregi Ngatia, also joined the investigation. The CID planned on visiting the scene of the crash and interview witnesses. Investigators placed a 2 km (1.2 mi) exclusion zone around the wreckage. By 13 April, it was reported that the cockpit voice recorder (CVR) and parts of the wreckage had been retrieved. The Harbin Aircraft Manufacturing Corporation ordered that other similar aircraft should not fly until the cause of the accident was determined.

Shortly after the accident, government spokesman Alfred Mutua said that initial findings considered bad weather to be the cause of the crash, stating that, "Initial investigative reports of the Marsabit air crash indicate that the Y-12 military airplane may have crashed due to poor visibility caused by bad weather." Some officials stated that bad weather conditions and low visibility may have caused the accident. At the time of the accident, heavy fog was present as the aircraft approached the runway. Eyewitnesses told local media that heavy rain was present at the time of the crash. Speaking to Agence France-Presse, Marsabit district commissioner Mutea Iringo stated that the pilots "lost direction of the airstrip because of foggy weather and then crash landed on a hill about three kilometres from Marsabit town." The survivors said that the weather conditions and location of the airstrip were the main causes of the accident. The Nairobi ATC stated that the crew had not reported any problems during the daylight flight to Marsabit. Speaking to The Standard, an investigator stated that "The pilots were unable to see ahead because it was foggy and it was raining. This caused the crash not any other thing."

According to a The Standard article published on 11 April, three hours into the flight, the co-pilot, Captain Joseph Njogu Muriithi, contacted Moi Air Base's air traffic control (ATC), telling them that he had heard a bang on the rear side of the aircraft, adding that he could not ascertain what was happening. No further communication between Moi Air Base's ATC and the pilots were established. In addition, The Standard also claimed that government sources had speculated that the flight could have either been shot down or been struck by an object. In response to the article, Mutua clarified that "the pilot of the aircraft never reported any mechanical failure to any control tower, and all initial investigations indicate the crash was caused by bad weather" and characterized reports of the aircraft being shot down or struck by an object as "[w]ild and reckless reporting".

On 12 April, it was reported that a preliminary report had been compiled by the Kenya Civil Aviation Authority. Transport minister Chirau Ali Mwakwere stated on 11 April that "The report basically points to the weather as the probable cause." By 14 April, it was reported that investigators had flown the wreckage of the aircraft to Nairobi for further analysis. Investigators, whose main interest was the black box, also left Marsabit after questioning witnesses to the crash and had scheduled to talk to the survivors. Although officials had yet to conclude the investigations, according to The Standard, preliminary investigations indicated that poor visibility caused the plane to crash. By 22 April, preliminary findings did not lend credence to a mechanical issue involving the aircraft. It was reported that investigators were pursuing pilot error as the cause of the accident. A division of the investigation focused on the pilots' social life, state of health, and the circumstances involving both pilots preceding the flight. Flight regulations maintained that pilots should not attempt to land at airports if the runway is not visible within 200 feet (61 m) above the ground. A pilot who had flown to Marsabit, talking to The Daily Nation, said that the absence of an instrument landing system (ILS), among other reliable navigational equipment, along with the aircraft not being capable of attempting a landing in "zero visibility", should have all been indications to not attempt an approach to Marsabit airstrip. Another pilot stated that the pilot should not have attempted to land, stating, "Pilot error is a most likely pointer."

=== The Standard ===
Front cover of The Standard on 23 April 2006.

==== Allegations of intoxication ====
According to a report published by The Standard on 23 April, the pilot-in-command, Major David Macharia Njoroge, had been drinking at a bar a few hours before the flight. (Note: Flight regulations mandate that there should be no attempt to operate an aircraft within 8 hours of having consumed alcohol, while under the influence, with a blood alcohol content of 0.04% or greater, or while using any substance that could potentially compromise air safety. In general, it takes around 12 hours to get rid of the effects of alcohol.) Shortly after the accident, investigators took blood samples from the bodies of the pilots, which were to be examined by Kenya's Government Chemist. Following claims that the pilot-in-command was drunk and that the aircraft involved was unairworthy, three MPs of the Kenya African National Union (KANU) called that the claims be investigated. Mutua confirmed that the pilot-in-command was at a local club but stated that the rest of the report published by The Standard was falsified, to which The Standard stood by its reporting. The final report concluded that the pilots were not under the influence.

=== Safety of airstrips ===
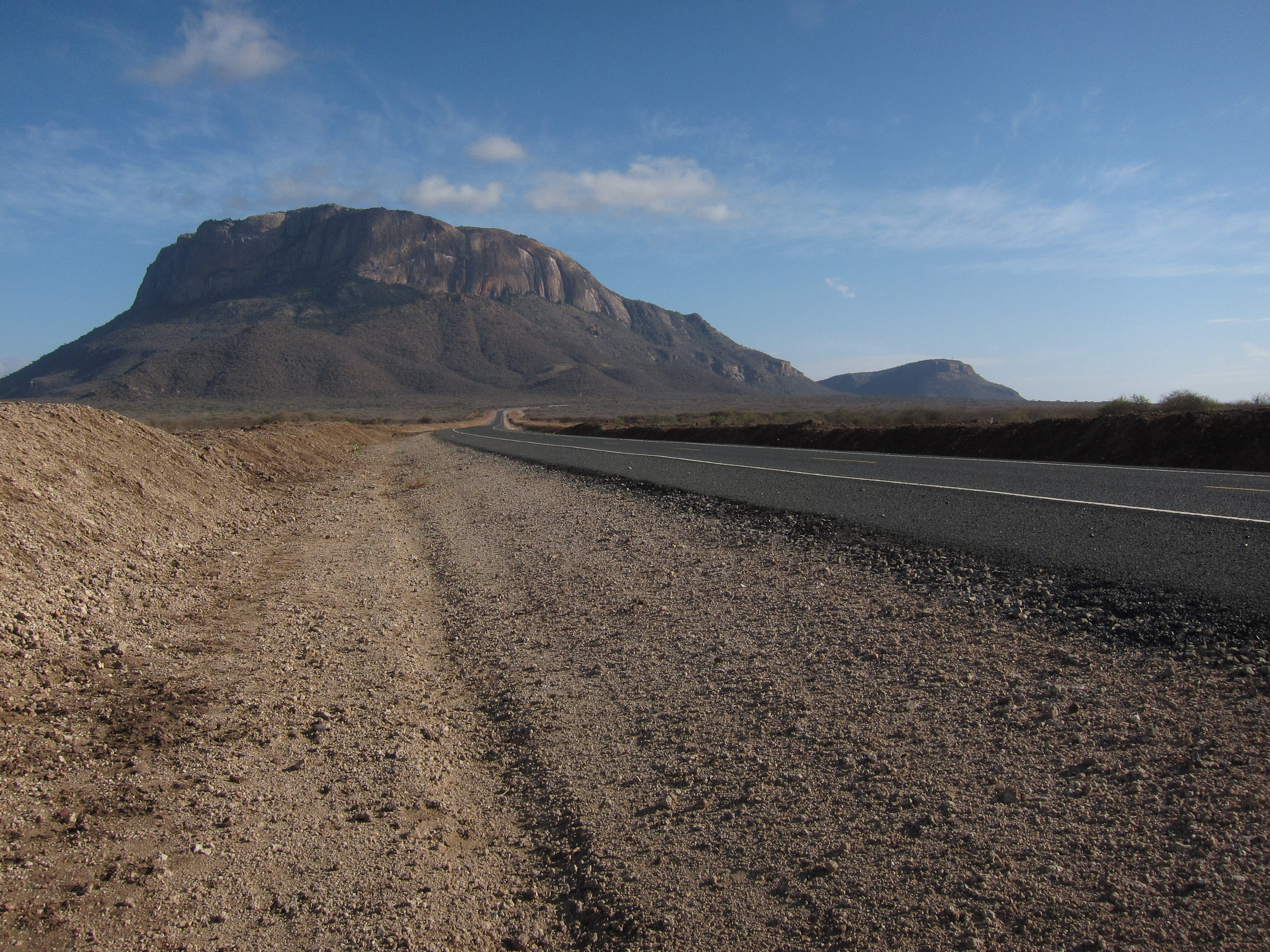
A view of Mount Marsabit surrounded by hills

Following the accident, an investigation by The Daily Nation uncovered issues involving Kenya's airstrips, including Marsabit's airstrip. Funding requested by the Provincial Administration to improve the airstrip was scarce, with only around one fifth of the amount requested being provided. As a result, the unmanned airstrip had no available ground crew that could have assisted the pilots and provided them guidance as they were attempting to land in low visibility. A pilot who had flown multiple times to Marsabit stated that its topography, which involves multiple natural barriers such as a ring of four hills and Mount Marsabit, made landing attempts difficult whether or not weather conditions were at their best. Additionally, concerns regarding the airstrip's location had been raised.

Following a plane crash in 2003 that resulted in the deaths of Labour Minister Ahmed Khalif and the aircraft's two pilots, a Commission of Inquiry, led by senior counsel Lee Muthoga and named the Muthoga Inquiry, concluded in 2005 that most airstrips in Kenya were poorly maintained, which meant that most airstrips were unusable, lacked up-to-date weather reports, or were near tall buildings, slums, or tall trees. It also noted that oversight over these airstrips varied, with some being inspected regularly with others having not been inspected in years, owing to staff shortages. Recommendations that were issued as a result of the accident aiming at improving general oversight and quality of Kenya's airstrips were found to have not been sufficiently implemented, if any. The inquiry had also found that the Kenyan government had not allocated enough money for their repair and maintenance. Additionally, in 1997, 2001, and 2002, the International Civil Aviation Organization had conducted safety oversight audits and had also issued recommendations to address the problems identified. The recommendations had yet to be addressed by the time the Muthoga Inquiry was underway. The condition of Kenyan airstrips were described as "pathetic" by MP Syongo.

=== Conclusions ===
Although Njenga Karume had promised to release a report on the crash, he told the Parliament of Kenya that the final report was classified as "confidential" as the aircraft belonged to the Kenya Defence Forces. The crash was blamed on bad weather. The number of deaths and injuries was the result of "the lack of rescue equipment and facilities and inadequately trained persons and teams for rapid response to such disasters" resulting in the deaths and injuries of the occupants. The report established that:

The air crew were qualified and the competent personnel, who were free of any external influence such as undue stress, alcohol or drugs. The aircraft was serviceable and certified fit for the flight. Before the crash, the captain of the flight attempted to land it safely at the Marsabit airstrip but unfortunately he failed. The plane crashed on a hill near the airstrip. The weather at Marsabit at the time of the crash was cloudy, foggy, and rainy. Visibility was at 2,000 millimetres above the ground. This adverse weather condition contributed to the occurrence of the accident.
