= Commander of the Air Force (Kenya) =

Chief of Kenyan Air Force

Commander of Kenya Air Force
- Incumbent; Major General Fatumah Ahmed since 2 May 2024
- Kenya Air Force
- Type: Commanding general
- Reports to: Chief of Defence Forces
- Formation: 1964; 62 years ago
- First holder: Group Captain Ian Stockwell

The Commander of the Air Force is the head of the Kenya Air Force. The post was created in 1964 with Group Captain Ian Stockwell of the Royal Air Force as the first commander. The current Commanders of the Air Force is Maj. Gen. Fatumah Ahmed, who was appointed on 2 May 2024.

== List of Commanders of the Air Force ==
No.	Portrait	Name	Term of office			Ref.
No.	Portrait	Name	Took office	Left office	Time in office	Ref.
1		Group Captain; Ian S Stockwell (1917–1998)	1 June 1964	22 February 1967	2 years, 266 days	
2		Group Captain; Fred Rothwell	23 February 1967	9 August 1971	4 years, 167 days	
3		Group Captain; David John Edwards	10 August 1971	16 April 1973	1 year, 249 days	
4		Colonel; Dedan Njuguna Gichuru	17 April 1973	26 June 1980	7 years, 70 days	
5		Major General; Patrick Mwagiru Kariuki	27 June 1980	11 August 1982	2 years, 45 days	
6		Lieutenant General; Mohamed Haji Barrow Mohamud	12 August 1982	13 March 1986	3 years, 213 days	
7		Major General; Dedan Njuguna Gichuru	14 February 1986	9 May 1989	3 years, 84 days	
8		Major General; Duncan Kireri Wachira	10 May 1989	28 June 1994	5 years, 49 days	
9		Major General; Nick Letoluo Leshan	29 June 1994	30 November 2000	6 years, 154 days	
10		Major General; Simon Kiplimo Muttai	1 December 2000	26 November 2003	2 years, 360 days	
11		Major General; Julius Waweru Karangi (born 1951)	27 November 2003	9 August 2005	1 year, 255 days	
12		Major General; Harold Mwakio Tangai	10 August 2005	12 July 2011	5 years, 336 days	
13		Major General; Joff Otieno	13 July 2011	30 July 2014	3 years, 17 days	
14		Major General; Samuel Nganga Thuita	31 July 2014	13 July 2018	3 years, 347 days	
15		Major General; Francis Omondi Ogolla (1962–2024)	14 July 2018	22 July 2021	3 years, 8 days	
16		Major General; John Mugaravai Omena	23 July 2021	2 May 2024	2 years, 284 days	
17		Major General; Fatuma Gaiti Ahmed	2 May 2024	27 June 2025	1 year, 56 days	
18		Major General; Benard Waliaula	27 June 2025	Incumbent		
