= 1982 Kenyan coup attempt =

Failed coup against President Daniel arap Moi

1982 Kenyan coup d'état attempt
- Part of the Cold War
Date	1 August 1982
Location	Kenya
Result	Coup failed

Belligerents
(Kenya) Government of Kenya; Supported by: Tanzania; Uganda; United Kingdom; Somalia; Zaire	(Kenya) Rebels; Supported by: North Korea; Soviet Union; China; Cuba (Uganda) NRM; Ethiopia; Libya; East Germany

Commanders and leaders
(Kenya) Daniel arap Moi (Kenya) Jackson Mulinge (Kenya) Mahamoud Mohamed	(Kenya) Hezekiah Ochuka (executed) (Kenya) James Waore Diang'a (Kenya) Pancras Oteyo Okumu (Kenya) Joseph Ogidi Obuon (Kenya) Bramwel Injeni Njereman

Casualties and losses
- 129

On 1 August 1982, a group of Kenyan military officers made a failed attempt to overthrow President Daniel arap Moi's government. Led by Kenya Air Force Corporal James Waore Diang'a and private Hezekiah Ochuka, the coup saw the rebels seize several air bases as well as the headquarters of state radio before they were retaken by government forces, resulting in the coup's failure. After being extradited back to Kenya from Tanzania, Ochuka was tried and found guilty of leading the coup attempt, and was hanged in 1987. Also implicated in the coup attempt were Jaramogi Oginga Odinga, a former vice-president to Jomo Kenyatta (Moi's predecessor), and his son Raila Amolo Odinga.

== Background and planning ==
After succeeding Jomo Kenyatta, Daniel arap Moi continued and intensified his predecessor's policy of political repression against leftist opponents. In the process, he also deployed the military against internal dissidents. This consolidated the army's institutional role in Kenyan politics. However, it also had the unintended consequence of creating openings for left-wing and anti-Moi elements in the officer corps itself (leftist officers such as Thomas Sankara and Jerry Rawlings held power in Africa in the 1980s).

Ochuka had become obsessed with becoming the President of Kenya at one time in his lifetime (he had the words "The next president of Kenya" carved on his desk), and this led him to quickly accept a proposal by Obuon and Oteyo to overthrow Moi's government. He recruited some of the soldiers at his base at Embakasi, including those who ranked higher than he. Meanwhile, Diang'a pragmatically capitalized on common grievances, such as irregularities in the delivery of military equipment, to rally support for the coup.

There was a heated debate amongst the plotters about who would become the chairman of the "People Redemption's Council" (PRC) that would assume power after the coup. For his part, Obuon claimed that he had recruited the largest number of soldiers into the plan, and so warranted the chairmanship. Obuon also added the fact that he had served as the chairman of the airmen's mess. Ochuka threatened in return that all the soldiers he had recruited to the plot would quit if he was not selected as the PRC's chairman. Obuon and Ochuka had a heated debate that almost broke into a fight over the chairmanship, until Oteyo intervened. Oteyo advised Obuon to leave the chairmanship to Ochuka, whom they could then kill once the coup had succeeded. Ochuka may have suspected the plot of Obuon and Oteyo. He rallied support from soldiers to him as an individual, and he went further to build a protective wall around him. Ochuka also rallied support from Obuon's old political friend and it is believed that the old friend even gave him two million shillings and a second hand car. He had also managed to steal some military communication equipment which he had set up at a private house in Nairobi which was located a few kilometres from the city center.

In late July 1982, Ochuka held a secret meeting at football grounds near Umoja estate, at which details of how the coup was to be executed were discussed. Ochuka told the attendees that he had the support of Uganda, Tanzania, and Sudan, who would send their soldiers to the borders to counter any opposition. He went further to allege that he had the blessings of the Soviet Union, which would send a ship to the Kenyan coast to guard against any external interference.

Details of the impending coup were known by senior military officials. James Kanyotu, the Directorate of the Kenya Security Intelligence had infiltrated the military and was also aware of the coup plot. After the opening ceremonies of the Nyeri ASK Show on Friday, 30 July, Kanyotu asked President Moi to give him permission to arrest the officers who were planning the coup. However, President Moi was not willing to involve the police in military matters. He preferred the matter to be dealt with internally by the military on Monday, 2 August. However, the coup happened on Sunday, 1 August before any action could be taken.

== Coup ==
At 3 A.M. on Sunday, 1 August 1982, a group of soldiers from the Kenya Air Force took over Eastleigh Air Base just outside Nairobi, and by 4 A.M. the nearby Embakasi air base had also fallen. At 6 A.M. Senior Private Hezekiah Ochuka and Sergeant Pancras Oteyo Okumu captured the Voice of Kenya radio station in central Nairobi, from where they then broadcast in English and Swahili that the military had overthrown the government. Working at the behest of Ochuka, Corporal Bramwel Injeni Njereman was leading a plot to bomb the State House and the General Service Unit headquarters from the Laikipia Air Base, Nanyuki. Corporal Njereman forced three pilots (Major David Mutua, Captain John Mugwanja, and Captain John Baraza) to fly two F-5E Tiger jets and a Strikemaster that would be used for the mission. However, Major Mutua was aware that Corporal Njereman had never flown a jet fighter before and would likely not be able to cope with the g-forces. The pilots, while communicating on a secret channel, agreed to execute daring manoeuvres to disorient their captor. The trick worked. The pilots dumped the bombs in Mount Kenya forest and headed back to Nanyuki.

The coup was strategically planned to coincide with the war games taking place in Lodwar, a remote town in Kenya, when most of the army units and the senior leadership were away from Nairobi. This meant that the senior-most officers present at the time were Lieutenant General John Sawe (the Army Commander and Deputy Chief of the General Staff), Major General Mahamoud Mohamed (Sawe's deputy), Brigadier Bernard Kiilu (Chief of Operations at Defence Headquarters), and Major Humphrey Njoroge (a staff officer in charge of training at Army Headquarters). At a meeting of the four, it was agreed that Mohamed would take charge of the operation to suppress the coup. He then assembled a team of about 30 officers from First Kenya Rifles Battalion and Kahawa barracks. The team stormed the broadcasting station and killed or captured the rebel soldiers inside. Leonard Mbotela, a broadcaster who had earlier been captured by Ochuka to announce the coup went on air to report that the rebels had been defeated and Moi was back in power. With the help of the General Service Unit (GSU) and later the regular police, Mohamed gained control of Nairobi, causing the Air Force rebels to flee.

President Moi, alarmed by the coup attempt, sent his bodyguards and soldiers to the Kabimoi farm of his estranged wife, Lena Moi, to move her to a secure location for her protection. When Moi's soldiers arrived to relocate her, the first lady firmly replied "No" and remained at her residence.

== Failure ==
Oteyo said that the coup failed because most of the soldiers did not execute their parts of the plan, as they were drinking and looting instead of going to arrest the president and his ministers. The coup leader, Ochuka, had gone to fetch a radio presenter, Leonard Mambo Mbotela. The plotters' poor organisation left the rebels unprepared for a counter-attack. They failed to capture or kill any of the political leaders they had targeted and did not seize the army headquarters. The air force rebels also lacked support from within the army, leaving them with no armor or heavy arms to take and hold key installations.

== Aftermath ==
The coup left more than 100 soldiers and perhaps 200 civilians dead, including several non-Kenyans.

Hezekiah Ochuka, whose rank of Senior Private Grade-I was the second lowest rank in the Kenyan military, claimed to rule Kenya for about six hours, before fleeing to Tanzania. After being extradited back to Kenya, he was tried and found guilty of leading the coup attempt, and was hanged in 1985. The other organizers were arrested and tried by court martial at the Army's Langata Barracks. Corporal Bramwel Injeni Njereman, who was an armaments technician, was the second to be convicted of treason on 24 November 1984. He was found guilty of five overt acts, and sentenced to death by hanging. Corporal Walter Odira Ojode was the first to be charged with the same offence, on 16 December 1982, of which he was found guilty; he also received the death penalty. Both appealed their cases and lost. Their death sentences, together with those of coup mastermind Ochuka and his counterpart Pancras Oteyo Okumuwere, were carried out on the night of 10 July 1985 at Kamiti Maximum Security Prison. Up to date they are the last people to have been executed under Kenyan law. A total of twelve people were sentenced to death, and over 900 were jailed. The convicts who were hanged were buried at the Kamiti Maximum Security Prison.

During the trials, the name of Oginga Odinga was mentioned several times as having financed the organizers, and he was put under house arrest. His son Raila Odinga, together with other university lecturers, were sent to detention after being charged for treason. Corporal Diang'a was also arrested, but managed to escape to Gothenburg, where he went on to become active in the Swedish Social Democratic Party.

After the coup attempt, the entire Kenya Air Force was disbanded. The coup attempt was also a direct cause for the snap 1983 general election. In response to alleged campus involvement in the failed coup, the Kenyan government accused external communist sources of secretly funding the coup attempt.
