= Leonard Mbotela =

Kenyan journalist (1940–2025)

Leonard Mambo Mbotela (29 May 1940 – 7 February 2025) was a Kenyan journalist. His career spanned more than five decades (58 years) .

== Early life ==
Leornard Mambo Mbotela was born at Lady Grigg Hospital, Mombasa on 29 May 1940. He was the first of eight children, to James and Aida Mbotela. Both parents are deceased. His late father was a teacher who taught in different schools, among them are Shimo La Tewa High school, Kabianga High School and ended up retiring as an educational officer. The mother worked with "Maendeleo ya Wanawake".

Mbotela had Malawian roots. Historically, at the tail end of the slave trade, a ship carrying slaves captured from Malawi was cruising through the East African coast, headed for Europe to sell them. Just as the trade decree came into effect, the British Navy intercepted the Arab slave ship in Mombasa, freeing all the slaves, including Mbotela's great-grandfather and his brother. He yearned to be a broadcaster from childhood. He liked talking and interacting with people of all kinds. He completed his secondary education in 1962.

== Career ==
After Mbotela completed his secondary education in 1962 at Kitui High School, Mbotela got a job in Nakuru as a training reporter with The Standard. Later he joined the Voice of Kenya (now Kenya Broadcasting Corporation) in 1964. He created his signature programme Je Huu ni Ungwana? in 1966. The programme continues to air on KBC radio to this day, making it the oldest in the industry. It has been running for the last 55 years.

In 1967, he went to the British Broadcasting Corporation in London for one year of journalist training.

In 1982, in an attempted coup to overthrow the then president Daniel arap Moi, led by a Kenya Air Force private, Hezekiah Ochuka, Mbotela was captured and forced to announce on live television that the country was under military control and that the president had been overthrown. The situation was then put under control by the GSU and later the regular Police led by Major General Mahamoud Mohamed and Mbotela was asked to announce that the rebels had been defeated and that the country was under the president's control.

Mbotela retired in 2022 as Kenya's longest-serving broadcaster. When he left the studio in 2022, he had been on air for 58 years.

== Personal life ==
Mbotela and his wife Alice Mwikali have three children: Ida Mbotela, Jimmy Mbotela and George Mbotela.

== Illness and death ==
Mbotela had been in and out of hospital severally before his death. In 2020, he had been hospitalized at Nairobi South Hospital for two weeks when he asked Kenyans and other well wishers for help offsetting the hospital bill. Then President Uhuru Kenyatta came to his aid and paid Kshs 1.1 million.

Mbotela died on 7 February 2025, at the age of 84. He had been receiving treatment at Nairobi West Hospital in Nairobi, having been admitted two weeks earlier.

== Publications ==
- Je Huu ni Ungwana? A Memoir
