= List of Kenyan European people =

The following is a list of notable Kenyan Europeans, either persons born in or resident in Kenya with ancestry in Europe.

== Academia, medicine and science ==
- Richard Dawkins – ethologist, evolutionary biologist, writer (emigrated to UK)
- Sir Geoffrey William Griffin – educator
- Colin Leakey – botanist (emigrated to UK)
- Louis Leakey – archaeologist and naturalist
- Louise Leakey – artist, writer and archaeologist
- Mary Leakey – archaeologist
- Meave Leakey – palaeontologist
- Richard Leakey – palaeontologist, archaeologist and conservationist
- Prince Emmanuel de Mérode (Belgian; emigrated to DR Congo) – anthropologist, conservationist, pilot
- Joyce Poole (elephant researcher) emigrated as a child with her parents

== Agriculture ==
- Hugh Cholmondeley, 3rd Baron Delamere, landowner
- Galbraith Lowry Egerton Cole, landowner
- Maurice Egerton, 4th Baron Egerton, soldier, landowner

== Business ==
- Geoffrey Kent - businessman
- Catherine Livingstone, businesswomen (emigrated to Australia)
- Eric Sherbrooke Walker, hotelier
- Michael Joseph, Founding CEO of Safaricom

== Conservation ==
- George Adamson – conservationist
- Joy Adamson – conservationist
- Donald Ker, safari guide
- Esmond Bradley Martin – conservationist
- Saba Douglas-Hamilton – conservationist
- Philip Percival, safari guide
- Alan Root – conservationist, ecological activist and Oscar-nominated filmmaker
- Joan Root – conservationist, ecological activist and Oscar-nominated filmmaker
- Dame Daphne Sheldrick – conservationist

== Law, government and politics ==
- Neil Aggett – anti-apartheid activist (emigrated to South Africa)
- Sir Michael Bear – Lord Mayor of the City of London (emigrated to UK)
- Sir Michael Blundell, politician
- Ewart Grogan – politician
- Elizabeth Furse – US Congresswoman (emigrated to the United States)
- Peter Hain – politician (emigrated to UK)
- Sir Wilfrid Havelock, politician
- Philip Leakey – politician
- Sir William Lindsay, lawyer
- Bruce McKenzie, politician
- Sir Humphrey Slade, politician

== Media, music and the arts ==
- Michael Asher – author and explorer
- Nicholas Best – author of Happy Valley: The Story of the English in Kenya
- Arap Bethke – actor (emigrated to Mexico)
- Mary Anne Fitzgerald - journalist, author
- Kuki Gallman – author
- Damian Grammaticas – Journalist (emigrated to UK)
- Tania Harcourt-Cooze– model (emigrated to UK)
- Aidan Hartley – news correspondent
- Elspeth Huxley – polymath, writer, journalist, broadcaster, magistrate, environmentalist, farmer, and government advisor (emigrated to UK)
- Sam Kiley – Journalist (emigrated to UAE)
- Beryl Markham – author, pilot, horse trainer and adventurer
- Edmund Morris – writer (emigrated to the United States)
- Jonathan Scott – conservationist, wildlife photographer, author, TV presenter
- Jules Sylvester – animal wrangler, TV presenter (emigrated to the United States)
- Errol Trzebinski– writer
- Roger Whittaker – folk musician (emigrated to UK)
- Adrian Zagoritis – musician (emigrated to UK)

== Military ==
- Robert Baden-Powell, 1st Baron Baden-Powell, British army officer and founder of the scouting movement
- Catherine Caughey, Bletchley Park codebreaker
- Henry Kitchener, 2nd Earl Kitchener, British army officer
- Oscar Ferris Watkins, British army officer

== Sport ==
- Alastair Cavenagh – rally driver
- Roger Chapman – golfer (emigrated to UK)
- Stephen Coppinger, squash player (emigrated to South Africa)
- Crista Cullen – field hockey player
- Jamie Dalrymple – cricket player (emigrated to UK)
- Elspeth Denning – field hockey player (emigrated to Australia)
- Ian Duncan – rally driver
- David Dunford – swimmer
- Jason Dunford – swimmer
- Chris Froome – bicycle racer
- Edgar Herrmann – rally driver
- Derek Pringle – cricketer
- Don Pringle – cricketer
- Jake Robertson, distance runner
- Zane Robertson, distance runner
- Simon Shaw – rugby union player (emigrated to UK)
- Paul Sherwen – cyclist and cycling commentator (Emigrated to Uganda)
- Carl Tundo - rally driver
- Seren Waters - cricketer
- Sir Frank O'Brien Wilson – cattle farmer and cricketer

== Other ==
- Denys Finch Hatton, big-game hunter
- Peter Poole – executed for murder
- Thomas Cholmondeley – landowner, convicted of manslaughter

== See also ==
- British diaspora
- White people in Kenya
