= AAAF =

AAAF may refer to:

- Anguilla Amateur Athletic Federation, the governing body for the sport of athletics in Anguilla
- Asian American Action Fund, a Washington, D.C.–based Democratic political action committee
- Association Aéronautique et Astronautique de France, the French national aeronautical and astronautical association
- Association of African Air Forces, African association for military aviation organizations
