= Samson Mwathethe =

Kenyan general

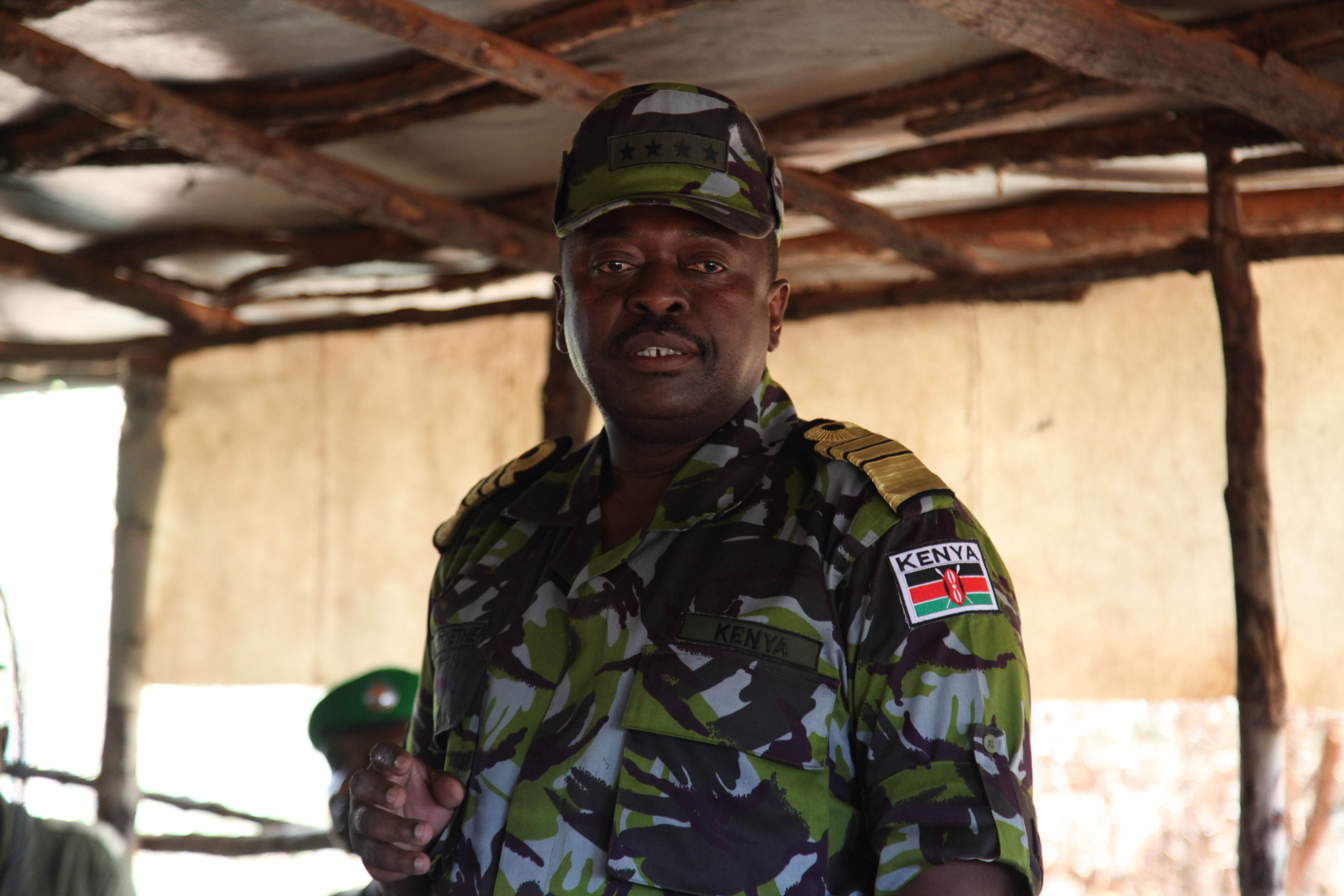
- Born: Malindi, Kenya
- Military career
- Allegiance: Kenya
- Branch: Kenya Navy; Kenya Defence Forces
- Service years: Since 1978
- Rank: General
- Commands: Chief of Defence Forces of Kenya; Vice Chief of Defence Forces of Kenya; Commander of the Kenyan Navy; Deputy Commander of the Kenya Navy; Commander of Logistics of the Kenya Navy; Base Commander, Mtongwe Naval Base

General (retired) Samson Mwathethe, is a Kenyan military officer. Effective April 2015 to May 2020, he was the Chief of Defence Forces (CDF) of the Kenya Defence Forces (KDF), the highest appointment in the Kenyan armed forces.

== Background and education ==
He was born in the coastal town of Malindi, Kilifi County, in 1958 (age 67–68). He attended Shimo la Tewa Primary School, in Malindi and Sacret Heart High School, in Mombasa.

In 1978, he joined the Kenya Navy and was sent to the Britannia Royal Naval College in Dartmouth, Devon, United Kingdom (UK). After graduation, he was commissioned as a Seaman, in 1980. He has taken courses at national and international institutions, including (a) an International Sub-Lieutenants Course in the UK (b) an International Principal Warfare Ordinance Course (IPWO), in the UK (c) a Missiles Study Course in Italy (d) a course at Royal Naval College, Greenwich (e) a Defence Resource Management Course at the Naval Postgraduate School, in Monterey, California, United States and (f) a course at the National Defence College, Kenya.

== Career ==
Samson Mwathethe served as Vice Chief of Defence Forces, a position he held immediately prior to his appointment as CDF. He has also held command appointments in the KDF, including as (a) Commander of the Kenya Navy (b) Deputy Commander of the Kenya Navy (c) Commander of Logistics in the Kenya Navy and (d) Base Commander, Mtongwe Naval Base. He has also served as the Chief of Systems & Procurement for the Kenya Ministry of Defence, as a Commander on various Kenya Navy vessels.

In May 2019, President Uhuru Kenyatta extended General Mwathethe's term for another 12 months to the end of April 2020.

== Other considerations ==
In 1991, he served as a United Nations military observer in Kuwait/Iraq and in Yugoslavia, the following year. He is a decorated military officer with the Distinguished Conduct Order (DCO) and Moran of the Burning Spear (MBS) medals.

== See also ==
- Uhuru Kenyatta
- Kenya Air Force
- Kenya Coast Guard Service

== Succession table ==
Military offices
Preceded by General Julius Waweru Karangi	Chief of Defence Forces of Kenya; 2015 - 10 May 2020	Succeeded by Robert Kariuki Kibochi
