= Peter Poole =

Kenyan murderer, executed 1960

- Poole at the East African Court of Appeal, March 1960
- Born: Peter Harold Richard Poole; 1931; Essex, England, United Kingdom
- Died: 18 August 1960 (aged 28); Kamiti Maximum Security Prison, Nairobi, British Kenya
- Cause of death: Execution by hanging
- Known for: Becoming the first and only white person to be executed for murdering an indigenous African in British Kenya
- Status: Executed
- Motive: Victim threw stones at his dog
- Conviction: Murder
- Penalty: Death

Details
- Victims: Kamawe Musunge
- Date: 12 October 1959
- Country: British Kenya
- Military career
- Allegiance: British Empire
- Branch: British Army
- Conflicts: Mau Mau Uprising

Peter Harold Richard Poole (1931 – 18 August 1960) was a British-born Kenyan engineer and shop owner. He was the first white person in Kenya to be executed for killing an indigenous African, and the only one as of 2009.

On 12 October 1959, Poole was charged with killing Kamawe Musunge, his houseboy, in Gordon Road, Nairobi. Musunge had been riding a bicycle when Poole's two dogs stopped him. Musunge threw stones at one dog, for which Poole shot him dead with a Luger pistol. On 10 December 1959, Poole was found guilty of murder by an all-white jury. The case took two trials. The first trial ended in a hung jury after one juror stood up and declared that he had a conscientious objection to any guilty verdict. Poole was sentenced to death by hanging, the mandatory sentence for murder in British Kenya.

At the time, Kenya was still under British rule, and the verdict was received negatively by many white settlers in the region. In Nairobi, Poole's parents circulated petitions for clemency, collecting over 25,000 signatures. According to Tom Mboya, European employers pressured their African workers to sign the petition. The case drew the attention of big-game hunter Robert C. Ruark, who said Poole was part of a bigger problem.

Kenya has always had a reputation for what the British call "bad hats", unprincipled free booters, unruly younger sons, and to characters of various shadings. We call Poole's type "Kenya cowboys", and I have seen them by the hundreds. They were generally too young to have experienced war, and the excitement of the Mau Mau was a welcome hatch for brawny, high-spirited young men to escape the boredom of hard work on the family farm by dashing off into the bush to chase "Wogs" with the same enthusiasm that they devoted surely to polo and football. But one way or another they got almost happily accustomed to killing, justly in some cases, callously in others, and, in many instances, for sheer sport. The nature of the Mau Mau and its practices were not such as to encourage either tenderness or discrimination. Peter Poole was one of the many who considered that if a man was black he was a nigger, if he was a nigger he was likely to be guilty of something, and it was easier to shoot him than argue with him.

However, Colonial Governor Patrick Muir Renison and Colonial Secretary Iain Macleod both declined to commute the sentence. Poole was hanged at Kamiti Maximum Security Prison in Nairobi at 8:00 am on 18 August 1960. Approximately 500 people gathered outside the prison. Following the execution, one white settler bitterly remarked "Now you've had your pound of flesh." An African yelled "Justice has been done!" He was then escorted away by the police. The London Spector noted the oddity in how, of all things, the execution of a white man for murdering a black man was the first major advancement for racial equality in Kenya.

It is a savage irony that future generations in Kenya will be able to point to 1960 as the year when the equality of the races was finally demonstrated, not by the granting of rights to Africans to farm on the White Highlands, or to become members of white clubs, but by the proposition that all men, regardless of color, are equal on the end of a rope.

Poole had emigrated to Kenya from Essex, England, in 1953, after which he immediately joined the Kenyan police reserves to fight the Mau Mau during the Mau Mau rebellion. He later joined the military, and served in Germany, before returning to Kenya in 1956. He owned an electrical shop on Nairobi's Government Road (now Moi Avenue). He was married with two children.

Poole had a history of violence and violent incidents. He once drew his gun and threatened an Asian shopkeeper for refusing to give him a discount on a flashlight. On another occasion, he shot a plainclothes African police officer in the legs when the officer was defending himself from Poole's dogs.

Poole was not the first white person to be convicted of murdering an African in British Kenya. In 1955, Leo Hoyle, a 25-year-old Northern Irish soldier of the Royal Irish Fusiliers, was sentenced to death for murdering an African woman after his insanity defense was rejected. However, the jury made a recommendation for mercy in his case. On appeal, Hoyle was declared insane.

== See also ==
- Thomas Cholmondeley, white Kenyan found guilty of manslaughter
