= Wrestling with the Devil: A Prison Memoir =

2018 book by Ngugi wa Thiong'o

- Author: Ngũgĩ wa Thiong'o
- Language: English
- Genre: Memoir
- Publisher: The New Press
- Publication date: March 6, 2018
- Publication place: United States
- Pages: 272
- ISBN: 1-620-97333-2

Wrestling with the Devil: A Prison Memoir is a 2018 memoir by Kenyan writer Ngugi wa Thiong'o. The book was published by the New York City-based publisher The New Press. It is an edited version of Thiongo'o's 1981 memoir, Detained: A Writer's Prison Diary, which was never published in the United States.

The book is about the drama and difficulties of creating fiction while under constant observation for twenty-four hours. In addition to capturing the unbearable anguish of being separated from his spouse and kids, he also depicts the spirit of defiance that characterizes optimism.

The memoir received positive reviews from Kirkus Reviews, The New York Times and Publishers Weekly.

== Plot ==
The memoir begins thirty minutes before his December 12, 1978, release from prison. He remembers, in one long flashback, the night a year prior, when he was taken from his home by armed police and imprisoned at Kenya's KamĪtĩ Maximum Security Prison, one of the biggest in Africa. He is segregated from the other inmates and resides in a prison block with eighteen other political prisoners.
