= Julius Waweru Karangi =

Kenyan military officer (born 1951)

Julius Wawerū Karangi
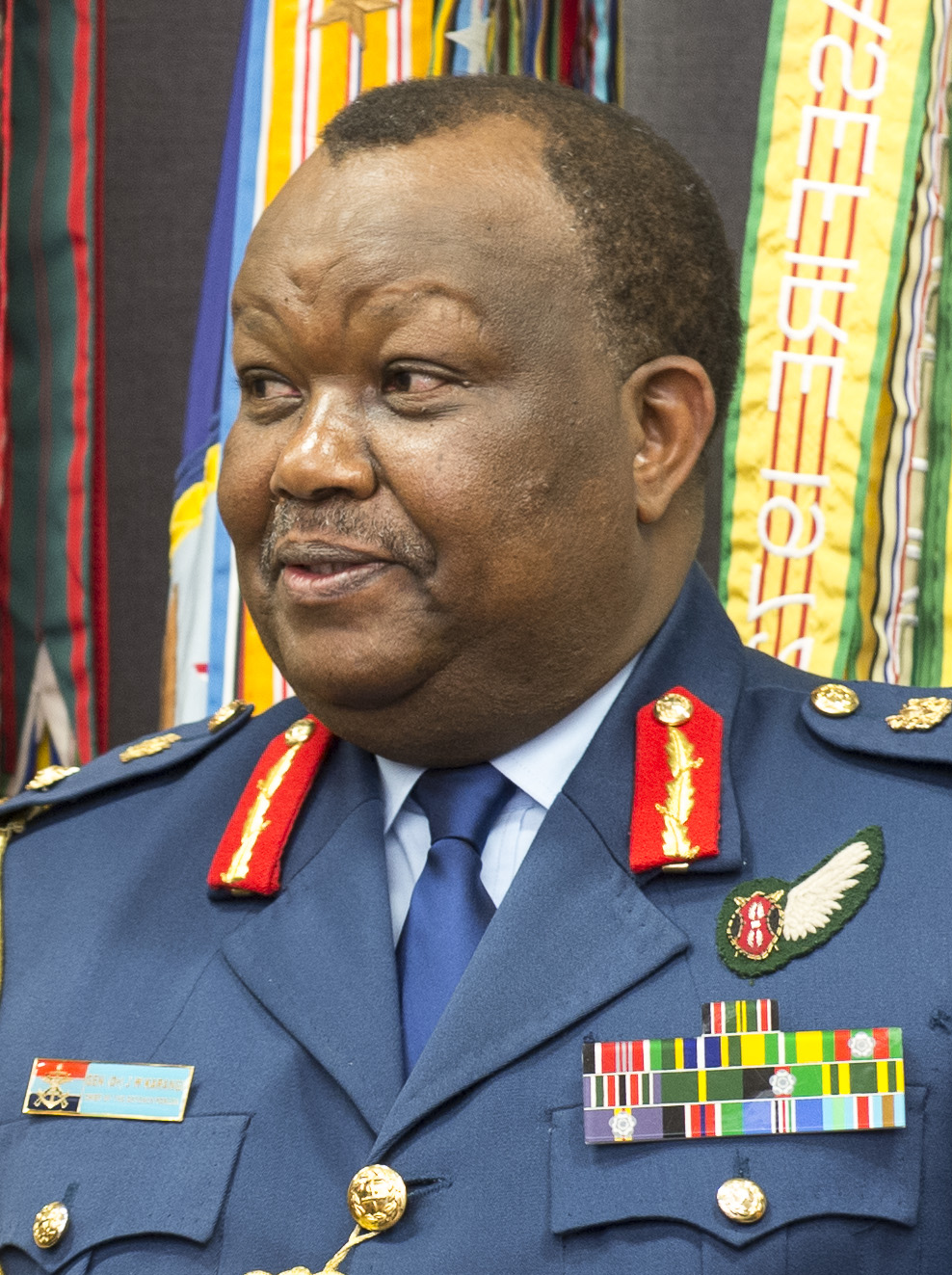
- Karangi (right) with U.S. Army General Martin Dempsey at the Pentagon
- Born: 28 April 1951 (age 75); Nyeri, British Kenya
- Military career
- Allegiance: Kenya
- Branch: Kenya Air Force; Kenya Defence Forces
- Service years: 1973-2015
- Rank: General
- Commands: Chief of the Kenya Defence Forces (CDF); Vice Chief of Defence Forces; Commander of the Kenya Air Force
- Conflicts: Operation Linda Nchi
- Awards: Elder of the Order of the Golden Heart of Kenya; Chief of the Order of the Burning Spear; Legion of Merit

Julius Wawerū Karangi (born 28 April 1951) is a retired Kenyan military officer who was Chief of the General Staff of the Kenya Defence Forces from 2011 until 2015.

== Military career ==
Julius Karangi joined the Kenya Air Force in 1973. He trained as a cadet in the United Kingdom and was commissioned as an officer in 1974. He qualified as a flight navigator in October 1975 and was assigned to the Flying Wing of the Kenya Air Force.

- 1995 – Commander of Moi Air Base
- 1997 – Commander of the Kenya Air Force Logistics Command
- 1998 – Chief of Procurement of the Kenya Defence Forces
- 1999 – Head of training, doctrine and procurement at the office of the Assistant Chief of Defence Forces
- 2000 – Commandant of the Defence Staff College
- 2003 – Commander of the Kenya Air Force
- 2005 – Vice Chief of Defence Forces
- 2011 – Chief of the General Staff
- 2015 – Retirement

== Honours and awards ==
General Karangi received the Order of the Golden Heart of Kenya, the Order of the Burning Spear and the Legion of Merit.

Military offices
Preceded by Maj Gen Simon Kiplimo Muttai	Commander of the Kenyan Air Force; 2003–2005	Succeeded by Maj Gen Harold M Tangai
Preceded by position created under the new constitution of Kenya	Chief of the Defence Forces; 2011–2015	Succeeded by Samson Mwathethe
