= North Horr Constituency =

Electoral constituency in Kenya

North Horr
- constituency for the Parliament of Kenya
- North Horr Constituency within Marsabit County

- Marsabit County within Kenya
- County: Marsabit County
- Population: 71,447
- Area: 19,337 km^{2} (7,466.1 sq mi)

Current constituency
- Created: 1988
- Number of members: 1
- Party: KANU
- Member of Parliament: Adhe Wario Guyo
- Wards: 5

North Horr Constituency is an electoral constituency in Kenya. It is one of four constituencies in Marsabit County. The entire constituency is located within Marsabit County Council area. The constituency was established for the 1988 elections. It is the largest constituency in Kenya on land coverage and hosts the only true desert in Kenya, Chalbi desert. Kenya's politician Bonaya Godana was its first member of parliament, and he represented until his demise in a Kenya Air Force Y-12 plane crash on 10 April 2006 in which all the legislators from Marsabit county perished.

== Members of Parliament ==
Elections	MP	Party	Notes
1988	Bonaya Godana	KANU	One-party system.
1992	Bonaya Godana	KANU	
1997	Bonaya Godana	KANU	
2002	Bonaya Godana	KANU	Godana died during his tenure in an aviation accident.
2006	Ukur Yatani	NARC-Kenya	By-elections
2007	Francis Chachu Ganya	ODM	
2013	Francis Chachu Ganya	ODM	
2017	Francis Chachu Ganya	FAP	
2022	Wario Guyo Adhe	KANU	

== Locations and wards ==
Locations
Location	Population*
Balesa Ririba	5,215
Bubisa	3,541
Dukana	6,660
Galas	4,000
Hurii Hills	3,373
Illeret	5,045
Kalacha	7,937
Maikona	7,092
North Horr	7,715
Turbi	1,800
Total	000
1999 census.

Wards
Ward	Registered Voters
Bubisa	2,886
Dukana	4,188
Hurri Hills	1,269
Illeret	681
Kalacha	2,023
Maikona	2,165
North Horr	4,421
Total	17,633
*September 2005.
