= Francis Omondi Ogolla =

Kenyan military officer (1962–2024)

Francis Omondi Ogolla CBS; EGH; HSC
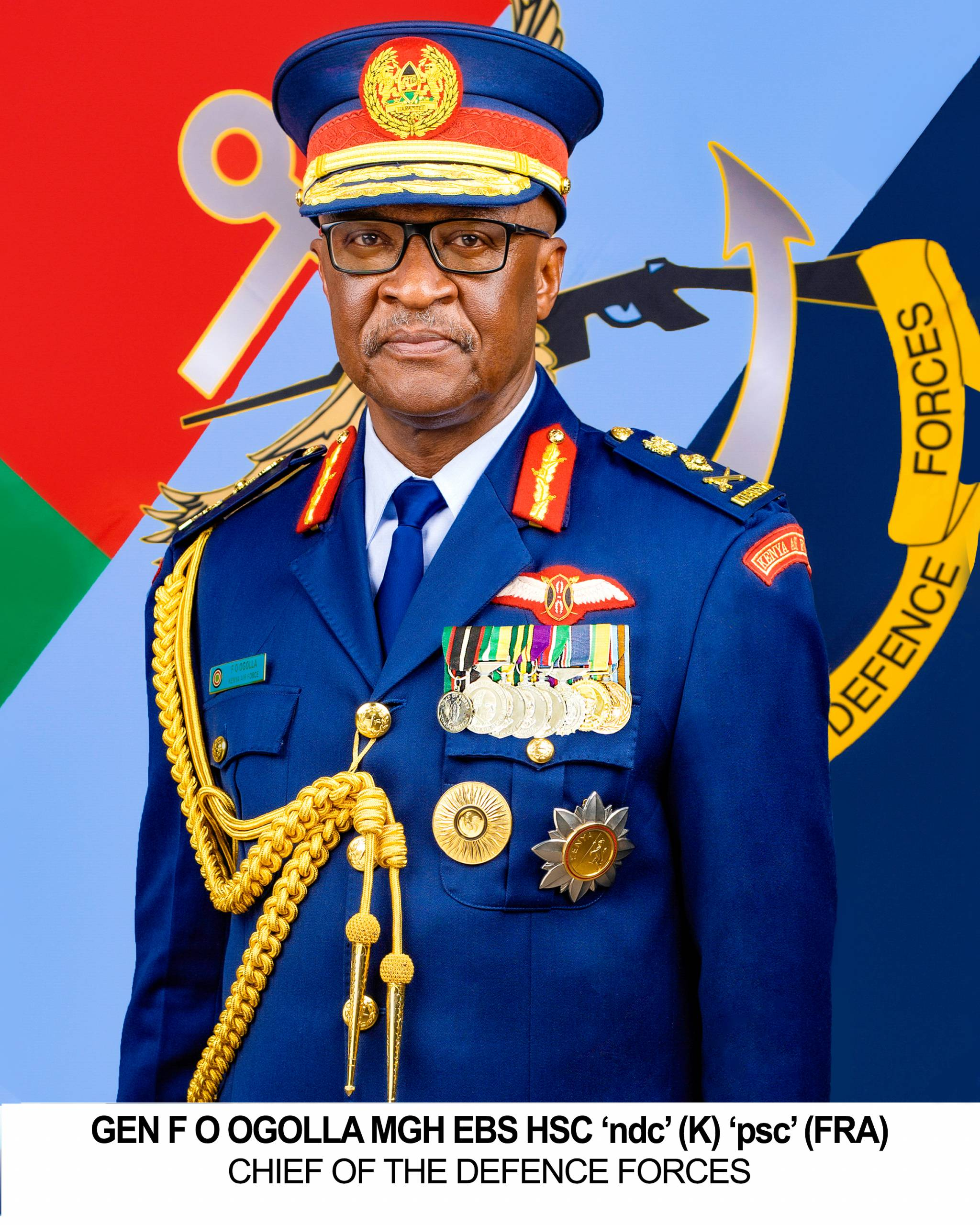
- Born: 12 February 1962; Nyanza Province, Kenya (today Siaya County)
- Died: 18 April 2024 (aged 62); Sindar, Elgeyo Marakwet County, Kenya
- Military career
- Allegiance: Kenya
- Branch: Kenya Air Force
- Service years: 1984–2024
- Rank: General
- Commands: Chief of the Defence Forces; Commander of the Kenya Air Force; Vice Chief of Defence Forces

General Francis Omondi Ogolla (12 February 1962 – 18 April 2024) was a Kenyan military officer who served from April 2023 to April 2024 as the Chief of Defence Forces (CDF) of the Kenya Defence Forces (KDF).

== Biography ==
Ogolla joined the Kenya Defence Forces in 1984. He began his career as a 2nd lieutenant in the Kenyan Air Force and received training as a fighter pilot with the US Air Force. In 2018, he became Commander of the Kenya Air Force and later Vice Chief of Defence Forces. He was appointed Chief of Defence Forces by President William Ruto after the retirement of General Robert Kariuki Kibochi in April 2023. At the time, Ogolla's appointment raised controversy after the head of the Independent Electoral and Boundaries Commission accused him of being part of a national security council delegation that tried to influence the result of the 2022 general election against the eventual winner, Ruto, who defended Ogolla citing his qualifications.

Ogolla studied and graduated from the École Militaire de Paris, the National Defence College of Kenya, Egerton University and the University of Nairobi. He was a recipient of several awards, including the Elder of the Order of the Golden Heart of Kenya (EGH) and Chief of the Order of the Burning Spear (CBS).

== Personal life ==
Ogolla was married to Aileen and had two children and a grandchild.

== Death ==
Ogolla died in a helicopter crash on 18 April 2024 in Sindar, Elgeyo-Marakwet County at 2:20 pm. Nine other military personnel also died, while two were injured. The aircraft was a Bell UH-1H Huey II operated by the 53 Tactical Helicopter Squadron of the Kenyan Air Force. The crash occurred while they were on a mission to reopen schools in the North Rift region following bandit attacks and to inspect soldiers involved in stabilisation operations.

President William Ruto declared three days of national mourning for his death, beginning on 19 April. Condolences were also expressed by former president Uhuru Kenyatta, US National Security Advisor Jake Sullivan, and President of Somalia's Jubaland State, Ahmed Mohamed Islam.

A memorial service was held for Ogolla in Nairobi on 20 April, followed by a state funeral in his hometown of Ngiya, Siaya County on 21 April.

== Investigation into the crash ==
The official report after a military probe into the crash stated that the helicopter crashed after an engine malfunction(engine compressor stall). The helicopter suffered complete power loss, a drop in engine rotations then an uncontrollable yaw. According to the report, the pilots could not manage to control the helicopter after the malfunction, leading to the crash after which it burst into flames. Experts cited maintenance issues for military aircraft as one of the primary causes.

Military offices
Preceded by Samuel Nganga Thuita	Commander of the Kenyan Air Force; 2018–2021	Succeeded by John Mugaravai Omenda
Preceded by Robert Kariuki Kibochi	Chief of Defence Forces of Kenya; 2023–2024	Succeeded by Charles Kahariri (acting)
