= Ian Stockwell =

British Royal Air Force officer

Air Commodore Ian Sargenson Stockwell, CBE, DFC, AFC (30 July 1917 – 15 November 1998) was a senior British Royal Air Force officer who served as a pilot during World War II and later commanded the Kenya Air Force on loan service.
