= William Waqo =

Anglican bishop in Kenya (died 2006)

William Waqo was an Anglican bishop in Kenya. He was Assistant Bishop of Kirinyaga and Provincial Secretary to Archbishop Benjamin Nzimbi.

He died when the Kenya Air Force plane he was travelling on crashed near Marsabit on 10 April 2006.
