= Francis Chachu Ganya =

Kenyan politician

Francis Chachu is a Kenyan politician. He belongs to the Orange Democratic Movement and was elected to represent the North Horr Constituency in the National Assembly of Kenya since the 2007 Kenyan parliamentary election.
