= Charles Muriu Kahariri =

Chief of the Defence Forces, Kenya Defence Forces

General Charles Muriu Kahariri CBS
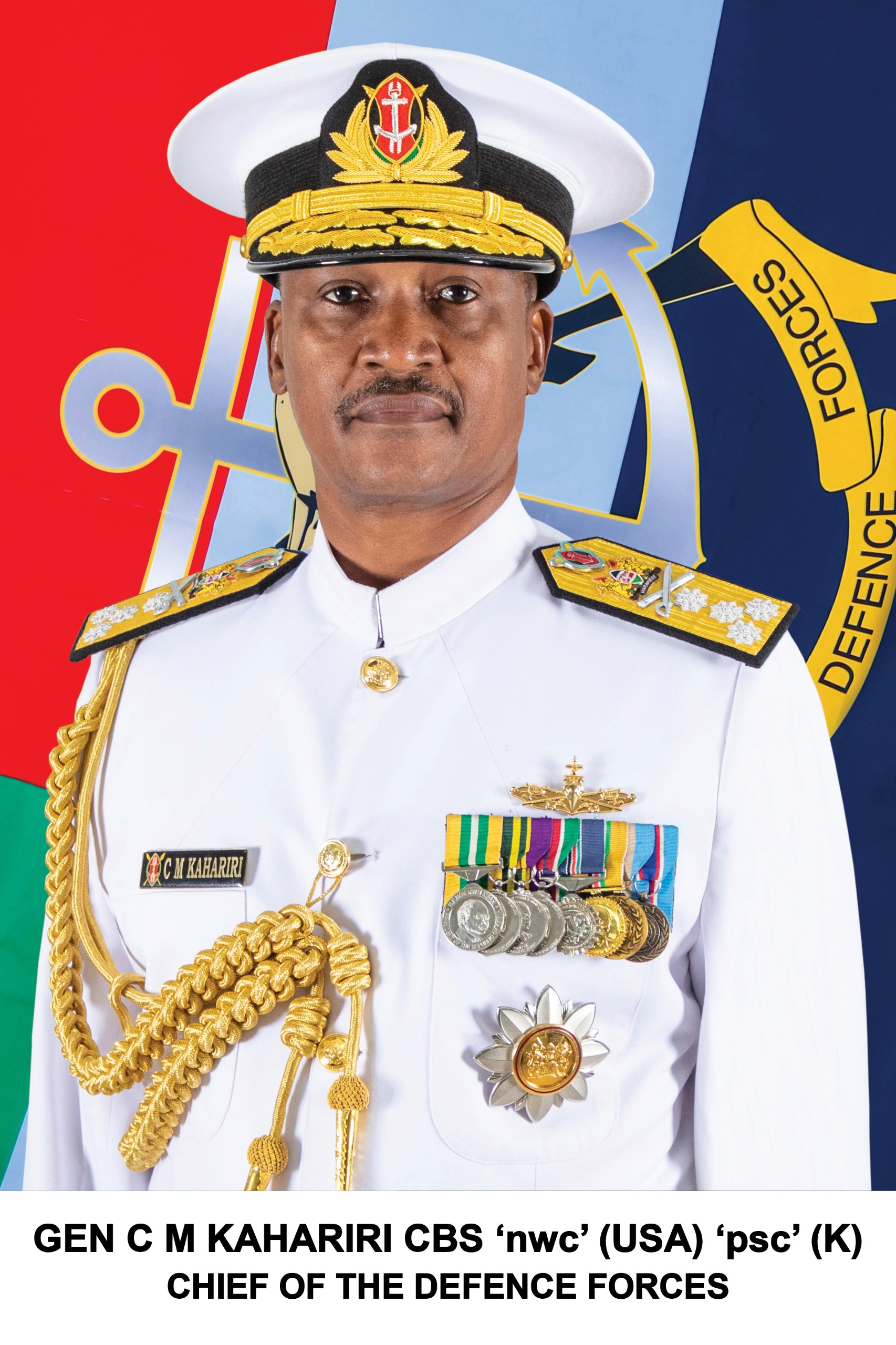
- Born: 24 November 1966 (age 59); Kenya
- Children: 3
- Military career
- Allegiance: Kenya
- Branch: Kenya Navy
- Service years: 3 April 1987 – present
- Rank: General
- Commands: Chief of the Defence Forces; Vice Chief of the Defence Forces; Senior Directing Staff at the National Defence College, Kenya; Deputy Commander of Kenya Navy

General Charles Mūrìu Kaharìrì is a Kenyan senior military officer, who was appointed the Chief of the Defence Forces of Kenya effective 2 May 2024. He replaced General Francis Omondi Ogolla, who died in a helicopter crash on 18 April 2024. Before that Kaharìrì was the Vice Chief of the Defence Forces of Kenya, from March 2023 until 2 May 2024.

== Background and education ==
He was born on 25 November 1966. He enrolled with the Kenya Defence Forces on 3 April 1987. He was assigned to the Kenya Navy. He graduated from basic training as a Second Lieutenant on 15 April 1988.

He has trained extensively both in Kenya and overseas. He attended a course in the United Kingdom shortly after his commissioning. Other military courses that he attended include the International Midshipman Course in the United Kingdom, the Long Navigation Course in India and the Naval Command Course in the United States. He also holds a Diploma in Strategic and Security Studies from the United States Naval War College.

== Military career ==
Over the more than 30 years that he has been a member of the Kenyan military, he has held numerous leadership, command, and management positions. These include as the Commanding Officer (CO) of Kenya Navy Ships Mamba, Madaraka, and Umoja and as CO of Kenya Navy Base Manda. He also served as the Maritime Component Commander for "Operation Linda Nchi" and as Task Force Commander for "Operation Sledge Hammer" during the strategic capture of Kismayo, Somalia. For a period, he served as the Deputy Commander of the Kenyan Navy.

He transitioned from the navy to the Kenya National Defence College, where he served as Senior Directing Staff (Navy), then as Deputy Commandant (Military) and as Commandant. He also served as the "National Focal Person for the Contact Group on Piracy off the Coast of Somalia and the Djibouti Code of Conduct".

On 2 May 2024 President William Ruto promoted Charles Kahariri from a three-star Lieutenant General to a four-star General and elevated him from Vice Chief of Kenya Defence Forces to Chief of Kenya Defence Forces for the next four years.

== Personal life ==
Kaharìr is married and has three children and one grandson.

Military offices
Preceded by Francis Omondi Ogolla	Vice Chief of Defence Forces of Kenya; 2023–2024	Succeeded by John Mugaravai Omenda
Preceded by Francis Omondi Ogolla	Chief of Defence Forces of Kenya; 2024–	Succeeded by Incumbent
