= Capital punishment in Kenya =

Capital punishment has been a legal penalty in Kenya since before its independence, and continues to be so under Kenyan law. No executions have been carried out in Kenya since 1987, when Hezekiah Ochuka and Pancras Oteyo Okumu, leaders of the 1982 coup d'état attempt, were hanged for treason.

Presidents have on occasion commuted all death sentences to life imprisonment, and thereby releasing all inmates from death row, most recently in 2016. There is no current policy to abolish the death penalty.

Despite the lack of executions, death sentences are still passed in Kenya. In July 2013, Ali Babitu Kololo was wrongfully convicted and sentenced to death following the murder and kidnapping of two British tourists, and in 2014 a nurse received a death sentence after being convicted of carrying out an abortion on a woman who subsequently died, although her sentence was eventually reversed by the Court of Appeal in Kenya.

== History ==
Capital punishment was introduced in Kenya in 1893 by the British colonial government; the practice was infrequent in pre-colonial communities, which placed a value on restorative justice. In general, most African communities did not use death sentences as part of administering justice except for offenders who had repeatedly "made themselves dangerous beyond the limits of endurance of their fellows". The penal code as created by the British stipulated a mandatory death penalty for murder, treason and armed robbery. Numerous executions, documented as 1,090 in number, were carried out by the colonial government during the Mau Mau rebellion.

After the 1982 coup d'état attempt, Hezekiah Ochuka, Pancras Oteyo Okumu and two other masterminds of the coup were convicted of treason, sentenced to death and subsequently hanged in July 1987. They were the last people executed in Kenya to date.

In 2010, the Court of Appeal repealed the mandatory death sentence for murder in Mutiso v. Republic, the third national court in common-law Africa to do so.

In 2016, President Uhuru Kenyatta commuted the death sentences of 2,747 inmates on death row to life imprisonment. President Mwai Kibaki had implemented a similar action in 2009. All of the 4,000 death row inmates who were awaiting execution had their sentences vacated and commuted to life imprisonment. The intention was to compel the prisoners involved to partake in physical labour, from which death row prisoners are exempt.

In 2017 the Supreme Court abolished the mandatory death penalty, declaring it unconstitutional.

A widely circulated report in 2018-19 implied that the government had announced its intent to reintroduce the death penalty for wildlife poaching. However, the report was not adopted and no such plans are in consideration.
