= Bonaya Godana =

Kenyan politician

Bonaya Adhi Godana

Minister of Foreign Affairs of Kenya
- In office January 1998 – 2001
- Preceded by: Kalonzo Musyoka
- Succeeded by: Chris Obure

Deputy Leader of Kenya African National Union (KANU)
- In office 2002–2006

Member of Parliament for North Horr Constituency
- In office 1988–2006

Personal details
- Born: September 2, 1952 Dukana, Kenya
- Died: April 10, 2006 (aged 53) Marsabit, Kenya
- Cause of death: Plane crash
- Party: Kenya African National Union (KANU)
- Education: University of Nairobi (LL.M) Graduate Institute of International Studies, Geneva (PhD)
- Occupation: Politician, Lawyer
- Known for: Peace negotiations, legal expertise, politics

Bonaya Adhi Godana (September 2, 1952 in Dukana, Kenya – April 10, 2006 in Marsabit, Kenya) was the foreign minister of Kenya from January 1998 until 2001.

From 2002 to his death in 2006 he was the deputy leader of the opposition Kenya African National Union (KANU) party. He was the Member of Parliament for North Horr Constituency. He died on April 10, 2006, in a Kenya Air Force plane crash near Marsabit. 13 other people were also killed in the crash while three survived. Among the other casualties were several other government officials including two assistant cabinet ministers who were political rivals of Godana. The politicians and religious leaders were on a mission to secure peace along the Ethiopian border. A decade earlier, on July 28, 1996, he survived a helicopter crash at the same Marsabit airstrip.

He graduated as Master of Law from University of Nairobi in 1976, and PHD of International Law from Graduate Institute of International Studies in Geneva in 1984. He was first elected to the National Assembly of Kenya in 1988.
