= Robert Kariuki Kibochi =

Kenyan general

Robert Kibochi
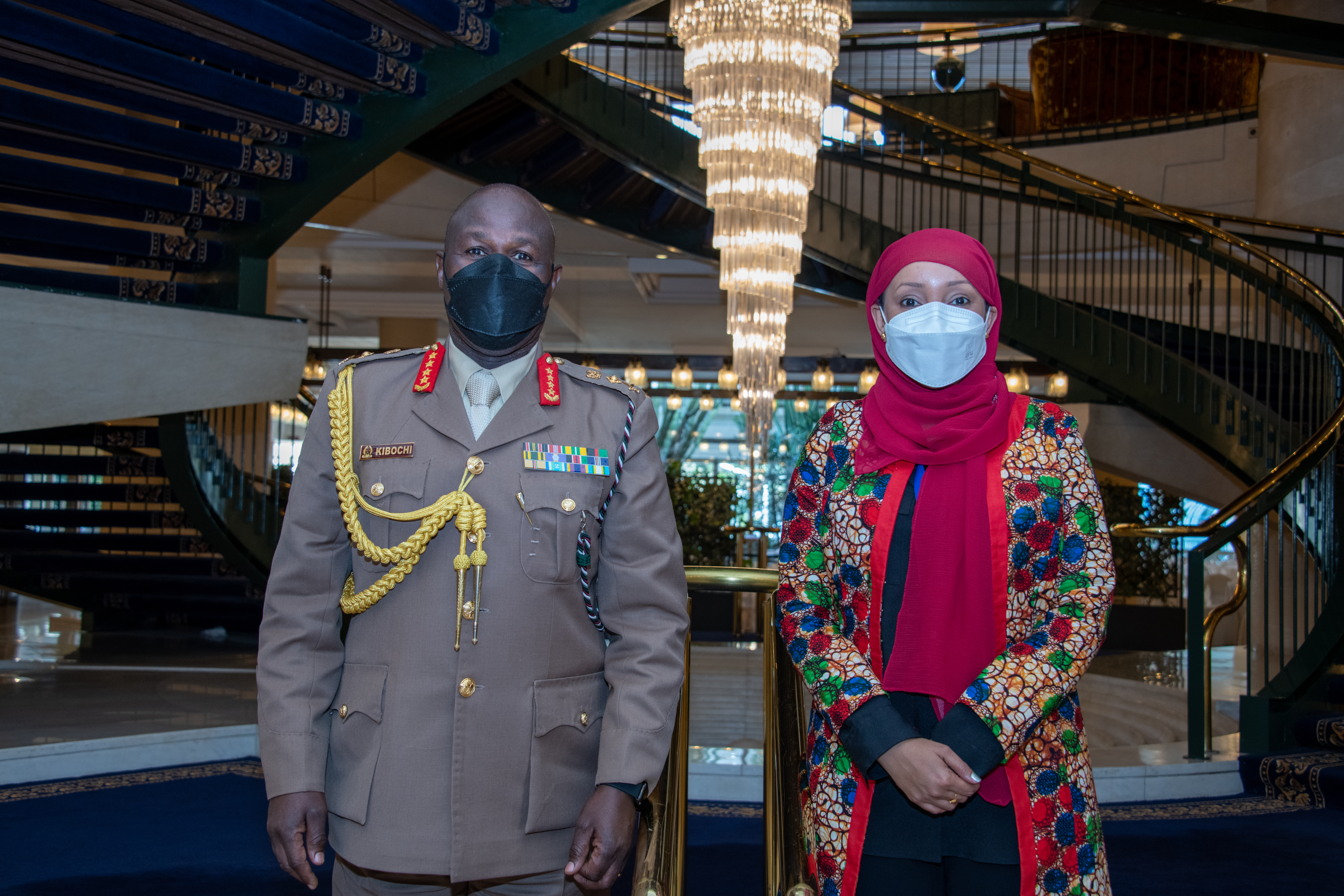
- Born: 1959 (age 66–67); Gilgil, Nakuru County, Nakuru, British Kenya (now Nakuru, Kenya)
- Military career
- Allegiance: Kenya
- Branch: Kenya Army
- Service years: 1979 - 2023
- Rank: General
- Commands: Chief of Defence Forces; Vice Chief of Defence Forces; Commander of the Kenya Army; Deputy Commander of the Kenya Army; Assistant Chief of Defence Forces in charge of Operations, Plans, Doctrine and Training

General Robert Kariuki Kibochi is a Kenyan military officer who served from May 2020 to May 2023 as the Chief of Defence Forces (CDF) of the Kenya Defence Forces (KDF). He was the first non-infantry officer from the Kenya Army to be appointed CDF as a member of the Kenya Army Corps of Signals, the military personnel responsible for conveying of information.

== Background and Education ==
He was born in the Rift Valley of Gilgil, Nakuru, Nakuru County, in 1959. He attended Koelel High School, in Gilgil and Nyeri High School, in Nyeri though he did not finish his A-Level Education as he opted for military recruitment and was enlisted.

In 1979, he joined the Kenya Army and was sent to the Armed Forces Training College (AFTC) in Nakuru, Kenya where he graduated with a Degree in Military Science. He was commissioned in the rank of Second Lieutenant and posted to Signals Battalion.

== Career & Education ==
Kibochi has achieved a PhD in Peace and Conflict Management and two Masters Degrees (International Studies and Computer-Based Information Systems) a Bachelor's Degree in Communication and Electronics Engineering. His other professional training includes National Security Studies at the National Defence College (Kenya), Army Command and Staff Course (UK), Overseas Telecoms Engineering Course (UK), Signal Officers Degree Telecommunications Engineering Course (India), Sub Unit Commanders Course, Platoon Commanders Course, Regimental Signal Officers Course among other training courses.

== Other considerations ==
He served with the United Nations as Commander of Kenyan Contingent in the United Nations Mission in Sierra Leone (UNAMSIL) from 2000 – 2001; while his decorations include Moran of the Order of the Golden Heart (MGH) and Chief of the Order of the Burning Spear (CBS) among others.

== See also ==
- Uhuru Kenyatta

== Succession table ==
Military offices
Preceded by Samson Mwathethe	Chief of Defence Forces of Kenya; 2020 - 2023	Succeeded by Francis Omondi Ogolla
