= Association of African Air Forces =

- Active: September 2015-present
- Type: Air Force Association
- Role: Enhance air mobility operations and collaboration within the African continent
- Size: 30 member nations

Commanders
- AAAF Chairman: Lieutenant General Oscar M. A. NYONI, Commander, Zambia Air Force
- AAAF Co-Chairman: General James B. HECKER, Commander, United States Air Forces in Europe - Air Forces Africa

The Association of African Air Forces (AAAF) is a voluntary and non-political organization; membership is open to Air Forces or their equivalent within the continent of Africa and the United States of America. The Association is operated with support from the United States Air Forces in Europe - Air Forces Africa (USAFE-AFAFRICA); a United States Air Force major command (MAJCOM) and a component command of both United States European Command (USEUCOM) and United States Africa Command (USAFRICOM).

AAAF fosters collaboration among the air forces of African countries to address trans-national threats, and to promote efficient use of air resources to improve air operations across Africa. During the 5th annual African Air Chief Symposium (AACS), AAAF was established and all signatory members "have an equal voice within the association, and will be recognized as the air force or the equivalent service of every other signing country."

== Charter ==
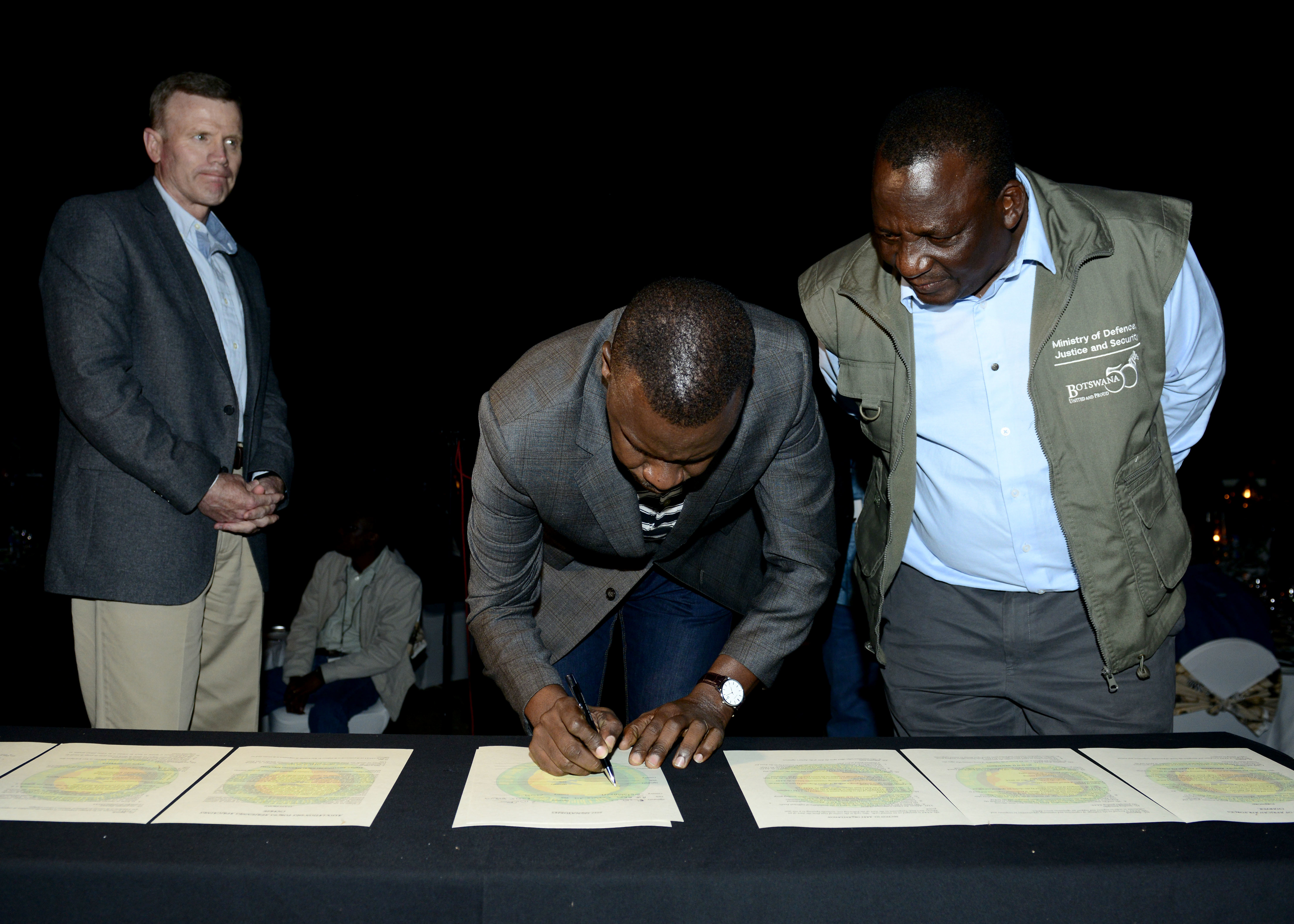
Gen. Tod D. Wolters, U.S. Air Forces in Europe and Africa commander, and Maj. Gen. Innocent S. Phatshwana, Botswana Defense Force Air Arm commander, facilitate a signing of the Association of African Air Chiefs Charter during the closing ceremony of the 2017 African Air Chiefs Symposium in Kasane, Botswana on May 17, 2017. (U.S. Air Force photo)

Official Charter of the Association of African Air Forces

The Charter of the Association of African Air Forces was formally signed into agreement on Sept. 17, 2015 by the U.S. and three African nations during the 2015 African Air Chief Symposium in Nouakchott, Mauritania.

According to the Executive Summary following the 2015 African Air Chief Symposium:

"Air Force Chiefs of Staff and Deputy Chiefs of Staff from eighteen African countries participated in the event, which focused on continuing to build a network of airmen to increase the capabilities of airpower in Africa (p.1)."

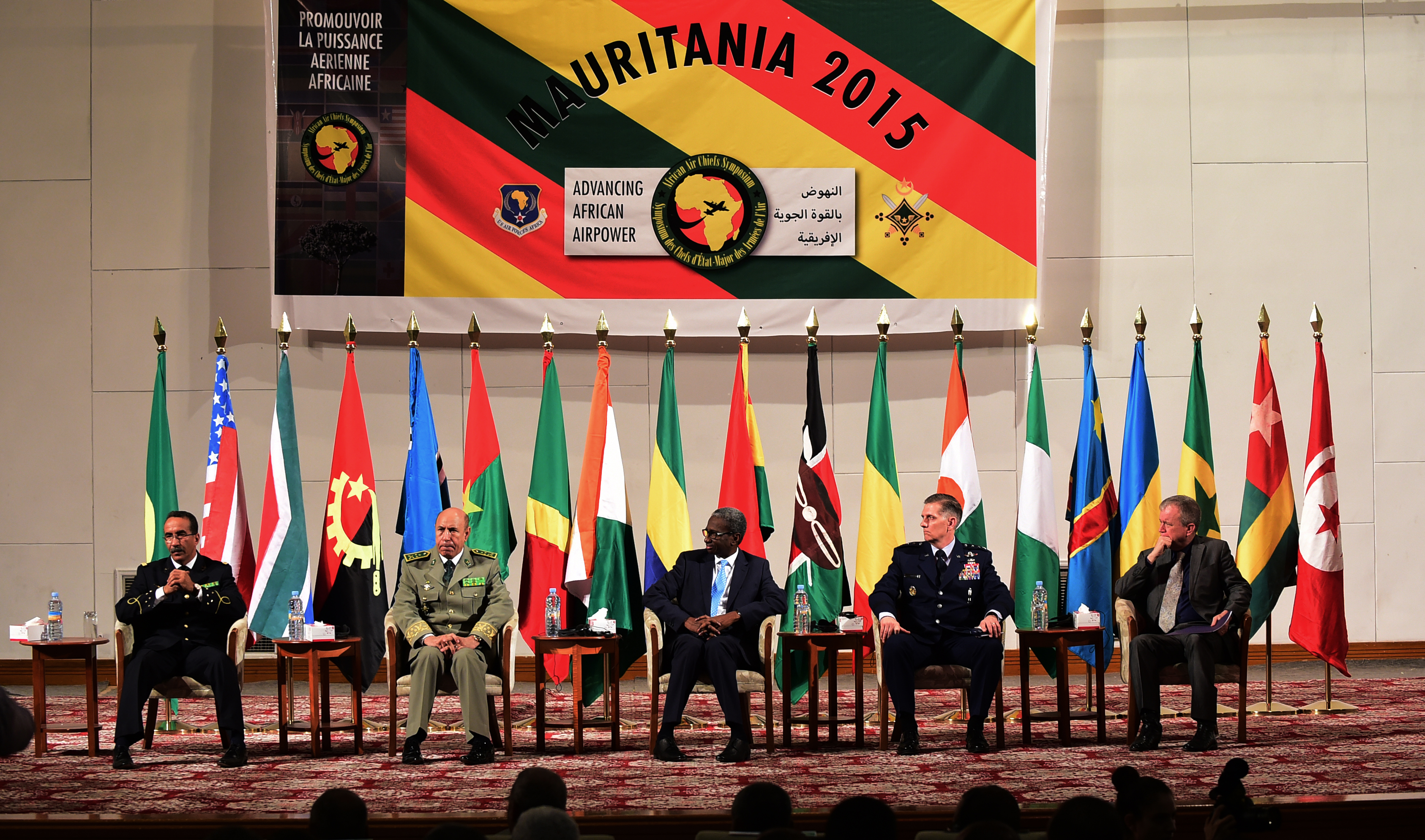
Mauritanian and U.S. leadership participate in the opening ceremony of the 5th Annual African Air Chiefs Symposium in Nouakchott, Mauritania, Sept. 15, 2015. The Mauritanian Air Force co-hosted the 2015 African Air Chiefs Symposium along-side U.S. Air Forces Africa Sept. 14-17, 2015 to give Air Chiefs from the U.S. and 18 African countries the chance to discuss the role of Air Power in addressing African challenges. (U.S. Air Force photo)

At the conclusion of the 2022 Symposium, two additional Air Forces signed, bringing the total number of signatories to 28.

Shortly after the opening ceremony of the 2023 Symposium, Somali air force Brig. Gen. Mohamud Sheikh Ali Mohamed, chief of the Somali air force, signed the charter bringing the total number of signatories to 29.

== African Air Chiefs Symposium ==
A function of the Association is to help assemble and advocate partnerships during the annual African Air Chiefs Symposium, hosted in a different African country each year. The symposium serves as a premier event for fostering trust and cooperation. At AACS, the AAAF members approve collaborative directives for their respective designated Liaison Officers (LNOs) to work on each year together.

Addis Ababa, Ethiopia, April 2011: United States Air Forces Africa (AFAFRICA), in cooperation with the Africa Center for Strategic Studies (ACSS), hosted the inaugural African Air Chiefs Conference from 25 to 28 April 2011. This event was an opportunity to explore contemporary air domain challenges and discuss the conference's central theme, Building Air Partnerships Across Africa. The Conference was attended by forty-one participants and sixty-one observers representing twenty-four African countries. The conference aimed to provide African Air Chiefs and other senior-level military leaders with an opportunity to build rapport and discuss their shared air safety and security challenges. Throughout the conference, attendees contributed a diversity of perspectives and exchanged ideas aimed at enhancing Africa's ability to manage its air domain.

Dakar, Senegal, August 2012: The United States Air Forces Europe (USAFE) and the Senegalese Air Force, with support from the Africa Center for Strategic Studies, hosted the North/West African Regional Air Chief's Conference with the theme "Beyond partnerships: Building Operational Frameworks for Cooperation". The conference goals were to continue the strategic dialogue started at the 2011 African Air Chiefs Conference at the regional level and provide a vehicle to increase cooperation among West and North African Air Forces. Specifically, the conference provided a forum to foster multilateral dialogue regarding common challenges in the Trans-Sahel region and promoted collective security efforts within the region.

Accra, Ghana, August 2013: The U.S. 3rd Air Force commander and the Ghanaian Chief of Air Staff hosted the Regional Air Chiefs Symposium at the Kofi Annan International Peacekeeping Training Center.

Douala, Cameroon, September 2014: United States Air Forces Africa and the Cameroon Air Force co-sponsored the fourth annual 2014 African Air Chiefs Symposium in Douala, Cameroon, with the support of the Africa Center for Strategic Studies (ACSS). Air Force Chiefs of Staff from fourteen African countries participated in the event, which focused on developing effective African air power strategies and formalizing a network among the air chiefs. They analyzed the role of air power in providing security in their countries and regions, the challenges facing this objective, and the steps they must take to reach their goals. They specifically noted issues of political will, the changing nature of threats, and the pervasive lack of familiarity with the role of air forces in providing security, from citizens to heads of state. In this process, the air chiefs learned about the network of Latin American air forces, the Sistema de Coperación Entre las Fuerzas Aéreas Americanas (SICOFAA) and indicated that this would be a good model for building their own organization.

Nouakchott, Mauritania, September 2015: United States Air Forces in Europe (USAFE) – United States Air Forces Africa (AFAFRICA) and the Mauritanian Air Force co-hosted the fifth annual African Air Chiefs Symposium. Air Force Chiefs of Staff and Deputy Chiefs of Staff from eighteen African countries participated in the event, which focused on continuing to build a network of airmen to increase the capabilities of airpower in Africa. The Association of African Air Forces charter was signed at the end of the symposium.

Ramstein, Germany, May 2016: The sixth annual African Air Chiefs Symposium was held in Ramstein Air Base, Germany. Air Force Chiefs of Staff and Deputy Chiefs of Staff from 26 African countries participated in the event, which focused on the opportunity to utilize mobility operations to increase overall impact of airpower in Africa. The symposium aimed at fostering a strategic dialogue on improving airlift operations across the continent.

Kasane, Botswana, May 2017: Headquarters United States Air Forces in Europe-United States Air Forces Africa (HQ USAFE-AFAFRICA) and the Botswana Defence Force Air Arm (BDFAA) co-hosted the seventh annual African Air Chiefs Symposium. Air Force Chiefs of Staff and Deputy Chiefs of Staff from 28 African countries, the African Union and the Deputy Under Secretary of the Air Force, International Affairs, participated in the event, which focused on the importance of training and force development to increase the capacity of African Air Forces. The symposium aimed at fostering a strategic dialogue on improving training coordination and cooperation across the continent. The 2017 event was the first to be held in Southern Africa.

Marrakech, Morocco, October 2018: Headquarters United States Air Forces in Europe-United States Air Forces Africa (HQ USAFE-AFAFRICA) and The Botswanan Defence Force co-chaired the eighth annual African Air Chiefs Symposium. Seventeen signatories were present and, during the Executive Session, Kenya and Zambia signed the charter bringing the AAAF membership to 22 members.

Nairobi, Kenya, August 2019: Headquarters United States Air Forces in Europe-United States Air Forces Africa (HQ USAFE-AFAFRICA) and the Kenya Air Force co-hosted the Association of African Air Force's ninth annual African Air Chiefs Symposium. Air Force Chiefs of Staff or their designated representatives from 35 African nations, the Kenyan Cabinet Secretary of Defense Policy, and the Ambassador of the United States of America to Kenya participated in the event. The Kenya Air Force Commander, Major General Francis O. Ogolla, as AAAF Chairman and USAFE-AFAFRICA Commander, General Jeffrey L. Harrigian, as co-chairman led all Symposium proceedings. The Symposium aimed at fostering a strategic dialogue on air policies and procedures in personnel recovery (PR). At the conclusion of the symposium, three additional Air Forces signed and joined the 23 current members of the AAAF, bringing the total number of signatories to 26.

Virtual with Tunisia Co-Host, March 2021: Headquarters United States Air Forces in Europe-United States Air Forces Africa (HQ USAFE-AFAFRICA) and The Tunisia Air Force co-chaired the tenth annual African Air Chiefs Symposium. In the first of its kind, the AACS took place in a virtual environment over a two-day period with 32 Air Chiefs present.

Kigali, Rwanda, January 2022: Headquarters United States Air Forces in Europe-United States Air Forces Africa (HQ USAFE-AFAFRICA) and The Rwanda Defence Force co-chaired the eleventh annual African Air Chiefs Symposium. 32 Air Chiefs were present and, during the Executive Session, Burundi and Gabon signed the charter bringing the AAAF membership to 28 members. Topics of focus included crisis management and strategic airlift, ISR and force development, airlift resource sharing and a senior enlisted panel covering NCO development and retention.

Dakar, Senegal, February to March 2023: Headquarters United States Air Forces in Europe-United States Air Forces Africa (HQ USAFE-AFAFRICA) and the Senegalese Air Force co-chaired the twelfth annual African Air Chiefs Symposium. Air Force Chiefs of Staff or their designated representative from 38 African nations participated in the event. Shortly after the opening ceremony Somali air force Brig. Gen. Mohamud Sheikh Ali Mohamed, chief of the Somali air force, signed the charter. The theme for the symposium was “African Air Forces in the Fight against Transnational Threats.” Air Force leaders across Africa discussed and shared challenges in three key areas: Intelligence, Surveillance, and Reconnaissance (ISR); Women, Peace, and Security (WPS); and Humanitarian Assistance and Disaster Relief (HADR).

Tunis, Tunisia, February to March 2024: The Tunisian air force hosted the thirteenth iteration of the African Air Chiefs Symposium in conjunction with Headquarters United States Air Forces in Europe-United States Air Forces Africa. The Symposium was co-chaired by the AAAF Chairman, Chief of Staff of the Tunisian air force, Lieutenant General Mohamed Hajem and the co-chairman, the Commander of United States Air Forces in Europe - Air Forces Africa (USAFE-AFAFRICA), General James Hecker. The symposium was attended by Air Chiefs and Air Chief representatives and their accompanying officers, Liaison Officers (LNOs), Women, Peace and Security (WPS) representatives and Senior Enlisted representatives from 35 African nations and the United States.

The symposium was centered on the theme of “Pan-African Education and Training Opportunities”. Lt. Gen. Mohamed Hajem, AAAF chairman, delivered the opening remarks. “We can strive to reach common ground and innovate all of our air forces,” said Hajem. “We can assist one another by working together to advance air cooperation in Africa. Education is the strongest weapon to inspire change, which is the heart of our African Air Chiefs Symposium.” The AACS 2024 constituted a pivotal moment in the development of the association, as the event signaled a clear shift in the operationalization of AAAF.

Lusaka, Zambia, March 2025: The 14th African Air Chiefs Symposium will be held in Lusaka, Zambia and hosted by the Zambia Air Force.

== Women, Peace and Security ==
An inaugural Women, Peace and Security (WPS) panel was held March 1, 2023 during the AACS in Dakar, Senegal. Five AAAF member nations participated in the panel: Benin, Malawi, Senegal, Ghana and Tunisia. Panelist spoke on initiatives impacting recruitment, challenges and areas of improvement for each nation.

The second annual WPS panel was held during AACS 2024 in Tunis, Tunisia.

The inclusion of WPS in AAAF, and establishment of a WPS Forum as part of the AAAF WG was approved by a 96% affirmative vote. The inclusion of WPS initiatives will contribute to member states’ efforts to meet the UNSCR 1325 requirements.

== Senior Enlisted Forum ==
The AAAF also hosts a Senior Enlisted Forum during AACS to collaborate in pursuit of solutions for shared challenges across enlisted forces in Africa through shared communication, enlisted development and combined training. Senior enlisted representatives from 22 African nations and the U.S. gathered for a senior enlisted forum during the 2024 African Air Chiefs Symposium held February 27 to 29 in Tunis, Tunisia.

“The senior enlisted forum is a crucial part of the Association of African Air Forces and allows air chiefs to both gain feedback from their enlisted forces and inject their vision and mission intent into their enlisted forces,” said Chief Master Sgt. Randy Kwiatkowski, U.S. Air Forces in Europe - Air Forces Africa command chief.

During the forum, African senior enlisted leaders worked together to refine a unified set of noncommissioned officer guidelines with a goal of using the document to develop the next generation of competent and committed NCOs in their respective air forces. Through a shared understanding of NCO and senior noncommissioned officer roles and responsibilities, African air forces plan to increase interoperability and collective capability. The senior enlisted forum plans on presenting their proposal during next year's symposium.

== Liaison Officers Working Group ==
The AAAF also hosts another conference each year, the Liaison Officers Working Group, which focuses on completing products and creating new proposals for the Air Chiefs to review and approve at the AACS Executive Session. Each AAAF member designates a Liaison Officer (LNO) that works with the AAAF Permanent Secretariat team to collaborate and develop tangible solutions and products to meet AAAF organizational objectives for its members. The LNO Working Group has been hosted in Senegal, Germany, Zambia, Ghana and Tunisia. The next conference is scheduled to take place in the Autumn 2024, location to be determined.

== Membership ==
These are the members of the AAAF.

- Angola
- Benin
- Botswana
- Burkina Faso
- Burundi
- Cameroon
- Chad
- Ivory Coast
- DR Congo
- Gabon
- Ghana
- Guinea-Bissau
- Kenya
- Lesotho
- Madagascar
- Malawi
- Mali
- Mauritania
- Niger
- Nigeria
- Congo
- Rwanda
- Senegal
- Seychelles
- Sierra Leone
- Somalia
- Togo
- Tunisia
- United States
- Zambia
