= Chief of Defence Forces (Kenya) =

Highest-ranking officer in the Kenya Defence Forces

Chief of the Kenya Defence Forces
- Standard of the Kenya Defence Forces

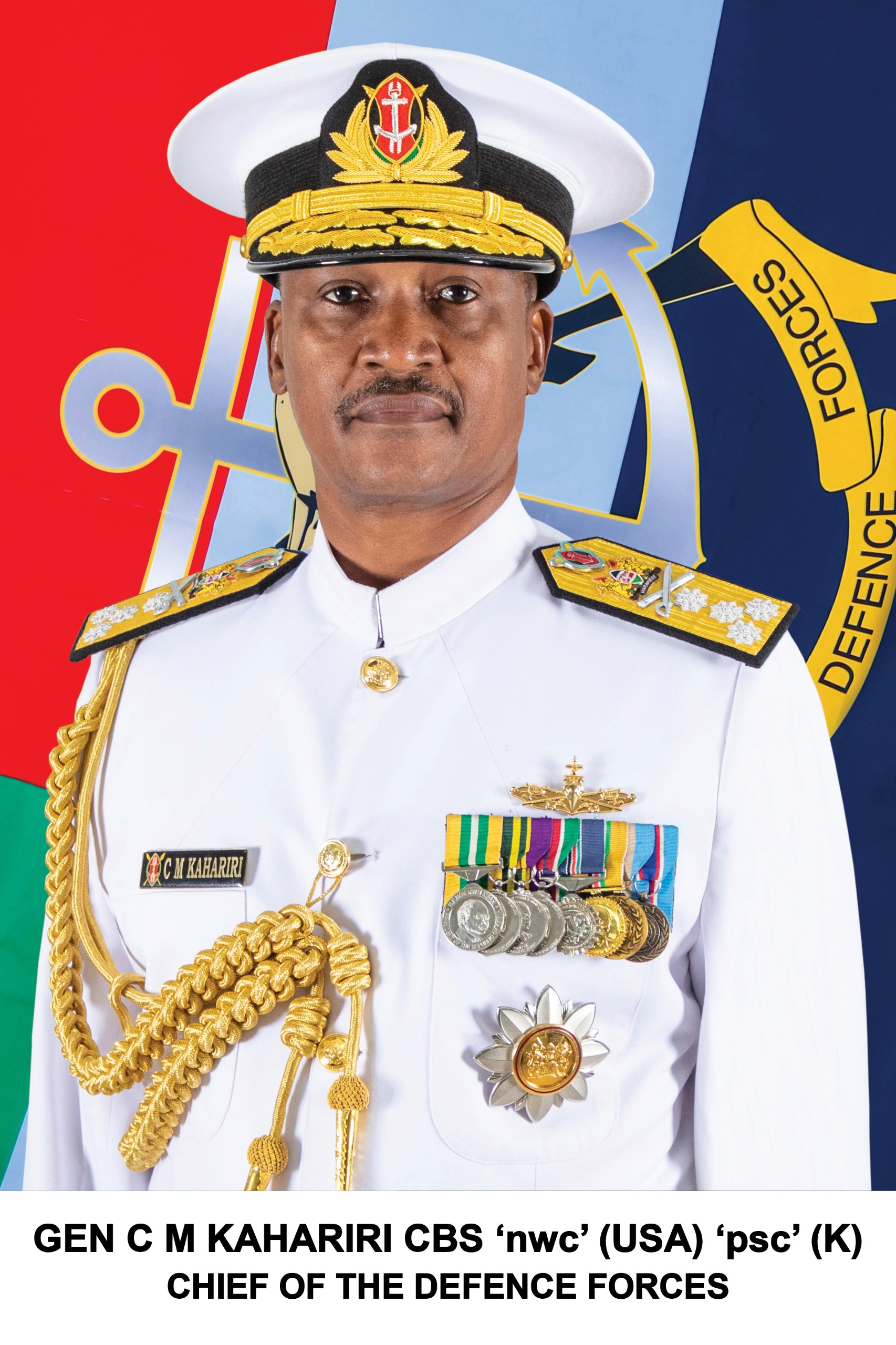
- Incumbent; Charles Muriu Kahariri since 2 May 2024
- National Security Council
- Abbreviation: CDF
- Member of: Kenya Defence Forces
- Reports to: President of Kenya
- Residence: Ulinzi House
- Seat: Ulinzi House
- Nominator: Defence Council
- Appointer: President of Kenya
- Term length: Serve a single term of four (4) years or retire upon the attaining of the mandatory retirement age
- Constituting instrument: Article 241 of the Constitution of Kenya
- First holder: Bernard Penfold
- Deputy: Vice Chief of the Defence Forces
- Website: Official website

The Chief of Defence Forces (CDF) is the highest-ranking military officer in the Kenya Defence Forces and the principal military adviser to the President of Kenya and the National Security Council. The CDF outranks all respective heads of each service branch and has operational command authority over the service branches. He leads the meetings and coordinates the efforts of the Service Commander, comprising the CDF, the Commander of the Kenya Army and Kenya Air Force, Kenya Navy and the Commandant of Military Intelligence. The CDF has offices in Ulinzi House. Following the 2010 Constitution, the Chief of the General Staff was replaced with the Chief of the Defence Forces.

== Duties ==
The office is considered very important and highly prestigious, because the CDF has command authority over the Armed Forces. The chain of command is from the President (as the Commander in Chief), directly to the CDF. The CDF, as a Principal Adviser, does have authority over personnel assignments and oversight over resources and personnel allocated to the commands within the respective services. The Chairman may also transmit communications to the service commanders from the President. He also performs all other functions as assigned from time to time by the President. The CDF may also allocate those duties and responsibilities to other officers under his name.

== General Requirement ==
Kenya puts requirement for the CDF position

1. Military Rank and Experience:
  - The individual must be a senior officer, usually holding the rank of Major General, Lieutenant General and General before being considered for the position.
  - They should have served in various high-ranking military positions and demonstrated effective leadership and strategic capabilities.
2. Training and Education:
  - A graduate of a military academy or officer training school is typically required. For the Kenyan military, this would likely involve training at the Kenya Military Academy or similar institutions.
  - Advanced military education, such as courses at top military institutions (e.g., National Defense College, Kenya or international military academies), would also be beneficial.
3. Proven Leadership and Service Record:
  - A strong record of leadership and performance in combat or military operations. This includes experience in various military branches, such as infantry, artillery, or intelligence.
  - Serving in significant roles during military operations and demonstrating success in managing and executing defense strategies.
4. Political and Administrative Understanding:
  - The Chief of the Defense Forces in Kenya is not only a military leader but also plays a significant role in national security and policy decisions.
  - Understanding the political environment and having strong relationships with political leaders is crucial. This includes cooperation with the President, the government, and Parliament.
5. Physical Fitness and Health:
  - Military leaders are expected to maintain high physical fitness levels. The CDF must meet the physical standards for military service, ensuring their health and capability for the demanding role.
6. Trust and Loyalty:
  - The CDF must have the trust of the government, the President of Kenya, and other senior officials. Political alignment and loyalty to the ruling government are crucial in appointments to such a prestigious position.
7. Leadership in National Defense Strategy:
  - The individual must be capable of shaping Kenya's defense strategy, ensuring the military is prepared for national security threats, and leading the military in defense of the nation's interests.

== Time Span ==
- The term of the CDF in Kenya is not fixed but generally lasts several years. The CDF typically serves between 3 and 4 years, with the possibility of term elongation. The Tonje rules established the maximum term length of a CDF as being four years or retirement at age 62 years (whichever comes first). The length of the term can also vary based on political decisions, performance, or changes in government.

== Appointment Process ==
- President of Kenya typically appoints the Chief of the Defense Force and Deputy Chief of the Defense Force, often after consulting with other high-ranking military and Government officials.
- The appointment may also involve review and recommendations by senior military leadership.

== List of chiefs ==
=== Chief of the General Staff ===
| No. | Portrait | Chief of the General Staff | Took office | Left office | Time in office | Defence branch | Ref. |
|---|---|---|---|---|---|---|---|
| 1 | Robert Bernard Penfold | Major General; Robert Bernard Penfold (1916–2015) | 30 November 1966 | 31 May 1969 | 2 years, 182 days | Kenya Army | |
| 2 | Joseph Musyimi Lele Ndolo | Major General; Joseph Musyimi Lele Ndolo (1921–1984) | 1 June 1969 | 24 June 1971 | 2 years, 23 days | Kenya Army | |
| 3 | Jackson Kimeu Mulinge | General; Jackson Kimeu Mulinge (1924–2014) | 25 June 1971 | 1986 | 14–15 years | Kenya Army | |
| 4 | Mohamud Haji Barrow Mohamed | General; Mohamud Haji Barrow Mohamed | 1986 | 1996 | 9–10 years | Kenya Air Force | |
| 5 | Daudi Rerimoi Chepkong'a Tonje | General; Daudi Rerimoi Chepkong'a Tonje | 1996 | 30 November 2000 | 3–4 years | Kenya Army | |
| 6 | Joseph Raymond Edward Kibwana | General; Joseph Raymond Edward Kibwana | 1 December 2000 | 31 August 2005 | 4 years, 273 days | Kenya Navy | |
| 7 | Jeremiah Mutinda Kianga | General; Jeremiah Mutinda Kianga | 1 September 2005 | 12 July 2011 | 5 years, 314 days | Kenya Army | |

=== Chief of the Defence Forces ===
| No. | Portrait | Chief of the Defence Forces | Took office | Left office | Time in office | Defence branch | Ref. |
|---|---|---|---|---|---|---|---|
| 1 | Julius Waweru Karangi | General; Julius Waweru Karangi (born 1951) | 13 July 2011 | 4 May 2015 | 3 years, 295 days | Kenya Air Force | |
| 2 | Samson Jefwa Mwathethe | General; Samson Jefwa Mwathethe (born 1958) | 5 May 2015 | 10 May 2020 | 5 years, 5 days | Kenya Navy | |
| 3 | Robert Kariuki Kibochi | General; Robert Kariuki Kibochi (born 1959) | 11 May 2020 | 28 April 2023 | 2 years, 352 days | Kenya Army | |
| 4 | Francis Omondi Ogolla | General; Francis Omondi Ogolla (1962–2024) | 28 April 2023 | 18 April 2024 | 356 days | Kenya Air Force | |
| 5 | Charles Muriu Kahariri | General; Charles Muriu Kahariri (born 1966) | 18 April 2024 | incumbent | 2 years, 179 days | Kenya Navy | |
