= Kenya News =

- Type: News website
- Founder: Kenya African National Union
- Founded: 1983
- Language: English
- Country: Kenya
- Website: https://kenyanews.co.ke

Kenya News is a name associated with both a historical Kenyan newspaper and a modern online news platform.

== History ==
The publication was originally established in 1983 as Kenya Times, founded by the KANU, which was then the only legal political party in Kenya. The paper was originally known as The Nairobi Times.

In 1988, Robert Maxwell acquired a 45% stake in the paper, while the remaining ownership was retained by KANU. The newspaper later became one of the prominent publications in Kenya and was among the first to adopt full-colour printing. It also launched a Swahili-language sister paper, Kenya Leo.

Kenya Times briefly overtook The Standard as the second most popular newspaper in Kenya (after Daily Nation), but its popularity declined after the 1992 general elections, the first multi-party elections in Kenya following the end of the one-party system.

Kenya Times ceased publication in early June 2010 due to financial problems.

== Modern use ==
The name Kenya News is also used by a contemporary online news platform operating in Kenya.
