= Jeremiah Kianga =

Kenyan former military commander

Jeremiah Mutinda Kianga
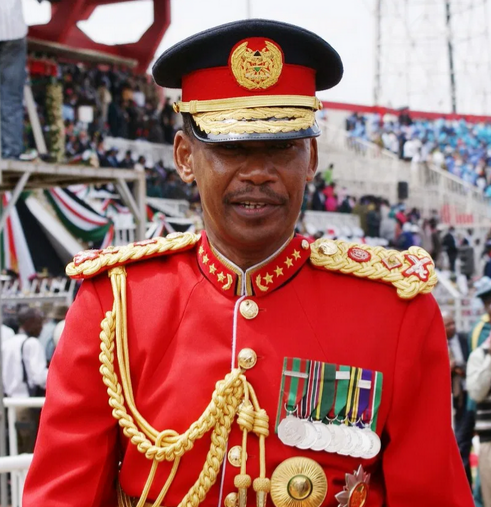
- General Jeremiah Kianga
- Born: Makueni County
- Alma mater: Royal Military College, Sandhurst; Command and General Staff College; Kansas University
- Military career
- Allegiance: Kenya
- Branch: Kenya Army; Kenya Defence Forces
- Service years: 1971-2011
- Rank: General
- Commands: Chief of General Staff; Commander Kenya Army; Assistant Chief of General Staff in charge of Personnel and Logistics; Deputy Army Commander; General Officer Commanding Eastern Command; Chief of Military Intelligence
- Conflicts: Mount Elgon insurgency

Jeremiah Mutinda Kianga (born 1950) is a Kenyan former Army Commander and Chief of the General Staff. He is known for having introduced the principle of Kaizen-continuous development for all officers in the Kenya Defence Forces. During his tenure he established collaborations with local universities to enable officers pursue further studies under the Defence Forces Continuous Education Programme.

== Early life ==
General Kianga was born on 26 April 1950 in Makueni District and finished his high school education at Machakos Secondary School in 1970. In April 1971 he joined the Armed Forces of Kenya and graduated from the Royal Military Academy in 1973.

== Career ==
Upon his commissioning from Royal Military College, Sandhurst Kianga was posted to the 5th Kenya Rifles as a Platoon Commander and did his regimental duty up to 1975. He underwent further training in Kenya, the United Kingdom, India and the United States where he obtained a Master's Degree in Military Arts and Science. He served a number roles in the Armed Forces from Chief of Military Intelligence at Defence Headquarters to General Officer Commanding Eastern Command in 1999. He later served as Assistant Chief of General Staff-in-charge of Personnel and Logistics at Defence Headquarters.

He was promoted to the rank of Lieutenant General and appointed Commander of the Kenya Army before replacing General (Rtd) Joseph Kibwana as Chief of General Staff under President Mwai Kibaki. As Chief of the General Staff he oversaw a large scale army operation in the restive Mount Elgon region after a near five year insurgency by the Sabaot Land Defence Force. The operation was a success with the rebel forces having been militarily defeated and relative calm restored in the area.

He retired from active service on August 12 2011 after serving for over forty years.

== Awards ==
General Kianga was inducted by the United States Army's Command and General Staff College as the 227th inductee in its International Hall of Fame and only the second Kenyan officer to ever be inducted.
