= Mutea Iringo =

Kenyan politician

Mutea Iringo is a Kenyan politician who is a former Principal Secretary, Ministry of Interior and Coordination of National Government, to the Cabinet of Kenya.
