= Hezekiah Ochuka =

Kenyan military officer

- Born: 23 July 1953; Nyakach, Kisumu District, Kenya
- Died: 9 July 1987 (aged 33); Kamiti Maximum Security Prison, Nairobi, Kenya
- Cause of death: Execution by hanging
- Other name: Awour

Hezekiah Rabala Ochuka (23 July 1953 – 9 July 1985) was a Kenyan military officer in the Kenya Air Force who claimed to have ruled Kenya for about six hours after attempting a coup against president Daniel arap Moi. Ochuka was the centre of the 1982 attempted coup, which then-president Daniel arap Moi defeated in less than a day. Hezekiah's military knowledge and connections enabled him to organize and attempt a coup against the Kenyan Government, and he assumed the title of chairman of a so-called "People's Redemption Council" that planned to replace President Moi. The Kenyan military crushed the coup within a few hours.

== Early life and career ==
Ochuka, of the Luo Nation, was born in Nyakach, Kisumu District to a single mother, in a household with three older brothers. After attending Naki kabete Primary School and Mirogi Secondary School, Ochuka was recruited into the Kenya Air Force in Mombasa on 14 September 1976. He underwent eight weeks of military training at Lanet Army Barracks in Nakuru in 1976 and was subsequently posted to Eastleigh Air Base. From 30 October 1978 to 21 January 1980, he attended a course in RAF Cosford, UK, after which he was promoted a Senior Private Grade-I, the second-lowest rank in Kenya's military.

== The coup ==
On 1 August 1982, Ochuka ruled Kenya for approximately 6 hours, after he led a group of low-rank Air Force servicemen in a coup d'état attempt. The group of soldiers led by Ochuka had stormed the national broadcaster V.O.K. (now KBC) where they announced that they were now in charge of the country and were fighting against government-loyal military units. They forced a group of Air Force fighter pilots to bomb the State House at gunpoint, but the supposed "trusted" or "converted" pilots dropped their bombs over the Mount Kenya forests.

The putsch was quickly suppressed by forces commanded by Chief of General Staff Mahamoud Mohamed, among which the paramilitary (police) General Service Unit (GSU) and regular police. President Moi announced that loyal army and police units had crushed an attempted coup on his civilian government six hours after it commenced.

== Aftermath ==
At least 19 civilians were killed; Kenyan hospitals reported that 50 civilians were treated for gunshot wounds. Scores of casualties were reported at three Kenyan Air Force bases, and more than 300 Kenyan Air Force personnel were captured and detained for partaking in the coup. Its leader, Ochuka, escaped to Tanzania, where Julius Nyerere had promised him protection, via Uganda. He was later apprehended and extradited to Kenya along with a few more leading accomplices. He was court-martialled in 1987 and convicted to the death penalty for treason.

Ogidi, one of Hezekiah's main coup accomplices, was arrested when he ran into a military roadblock, and a submachine gun and 32 rounds of ammunition were confiscated. Initially, he was taken to Army Headquarters (where another accomplice named Opwapo was later brought in as well), and then transferred to Kamiti Maximum Security Prison.

Both Ochuka and Ogidi were hanged on 9 July 1985 after having received a death sentence for treason.

== See also ==
- Daniel arap Moi
- Politics of Kenya
- Mombasa
- Kenyan Air Force
- Tanzania
