= Kamiti Maximum Security Prison =

Prison in Nairobi, Kenya

Coordinates: 1.177°S 36.894°E

- Interactive map of Kamiti Maximum Security Prison
- Location: Kahawa West, Kasarani, Nairobi
- Status: Operational
- Security class: Maximum security prison
- Opened: 1955
- Managed by: Kenya Prisons Service

Kamiti Maximum Security Prison is a prison in Nairobi, Kenya. The prison is within Kasarani District, bordering Kiambu County. Originally named "Kamiti Downs", it sits in the middle of its own 490-hectare (1,200-acre) estates which lie fallow and untended.

== Overview ==
During the 1980s and early 1990s many political prisoners were held at Kamiti, including Hussein Onyango Obama, Kenneth Matiba, Raila Odinga, Koigi wa Wamwere, Ngũgĩ wa Thiong'o, Jonah Anguka and numerous others.

Many executions have been carried out in Kamiti. Mau Mau rebel leader Dedan Kimathi was hanged by the British colonial administration on 18 February 1957. Hezekiah Ochuka and Pancras Oteyo Okumu were executed there on 17 May 1987. No death penalties have been held in Kenya since, although capital punishment is not formally abolished.

Kenya's prisons are infamous for poor conditions and inhumane treatment, although the situation has improved slightly during Mwai Kibaki's government since 2002 and some prisoners on death row have been released. There is still no reliable water supply, with over 200 prisoners hauling buckets of water around daily. The inmates working in the "industry" section are paid only 10 cents (Kenya shilling) per day, as per the outdated 1940s legislation which rules the organisation.

Within the prison, condemned "G" block is famed for its particularly brutal lifestyle, characterised by predatory sodomy and mobile phone confidence tricksters. The prison was built for 1400 prisoners, and it now houses over 3600 in poor living conditions.

On 17 November 2008, a search was carried out in G block for mobile phones which resulted in a brutal beating by the warders being captured on mobile phone video and given to the Kenya National Commission on Human Rights (KNCHR), and shown on Kenyan TV.

Kirugumi wa Wanjuki was the longest serving and to date last hangman at Kamiti. Wanjuki died in 2009.

In November 2009, at least eight prisoners died due to cholera outbreak at Kamiti Prison.

== See also ==
- Thomas Cholmondeley
