= Mahamoud Mohamed =

Kenyan former military commander

Mohamud Haji Mohamed
- Born: Sankuri, Kenya
- Military career
- Allegiance: Kenya
- Branch: Kenya Defence Forces
- Service years: 1955–1996
- Rank: General
- Commands: Chief of General Staff; Deputy Commander Kenya Army (Note: On the dissolution of the Kenyan Air Force after the 1982 coup attempt, the air force element of the Kenyan military was put under the army, akin to the US Army Airforces before 1947 and then Major General Mohammed promoted to Lieutenant General as commander of the '82 Airforce.)
- Conflicts: 1982 Kenyan coup d'etat attempt

General Mohamud Haji Mohamed Barrow (Somali: Maxamuud Maxamed) is a former Kenyan military commander, and was Chief of General Staff of the Kenyan military and Commander Kenya Army.

== Career ==
Mohamed was born to an ethnic Somali community from the Abdulwak sub-clan of the Ogaden Darod in northeastern Kenya. His younger brother Hussein Maalim Mohamed was Kenya's Minister of State in the office of the presidency, the first Somali to be appointed to the cabinet.

He was Deputy Commander Kenya Army from 1979 to 1981.

On 1 August 1982, Mohamed commanded Kenyan military and police forces in a successful suppression of a coup d'état attempt against then President of Kenya Daniel arap Moi. The putsch had been staged by a group of low-ranking military officers led by Senior Private Hezekiah Ochuka, who was later found guilty of five overt acts and sentenced to death by hanging.

Mohamed would remain the Chief of General Staff of the Kenya Defence Forces for the next ten years.

== See also ==
- Hussein Maalim Mohamed
- Mohammed Hussein Ali
