= Kenya Air Force =

Air warfare branch of Kenya's military

- Jeshi la Wanahewa
- Emblem of the Kenya Air Force
- Founded: 1 June 1964; 62 years ago
- Country: Kenya
- Type: Air force
- Role: Aerial warfare
- Size: 149 Aircraft
- Part of: Kenya Defence Forces
- Headquarters: Nairobi
- Mottos: Tuko Imara Angani; "We are steadfast in the sky"
- Engagements: Operation Linda Nchi; AU Mission in Somalia
- Website: mod.go.ke/kenya-air-force/

Commanders
- Commander-in-Chief: President William Ruto
- Commander of the Air Force: Major General Bernard Waliaula

Insignia
- Roundel

- Fin flash

- Flag

Aircraft flown
- Fighter: Northrop F-5
- Helicopter: Mil Mi-28 Mil Mi-171, SA330 Puma, IAR 330, Bell UH-1, Eurocopter AS350, AgustaWestland AW139
- Attack helicopter: Bell AH-1
- Reconnaissance: Cessna 208
- Trainer: Scottish Aviation Bulldog, Short Tucano, Grob G 120
- Transport: DHC-5, Harbin Y-12, C-27J Spartan, Fokker 70, Bombardier Dash 8, C-145 Skytruck

The Kenya Air Force (KAF) or Swahili: Jeshi la Wanahewa is the national aerial warfare service branch of the Republic of Kenya.

The main airbase operating fighters is Laikipia Air Base in Nanyuki, while Moi Air Base in Eastleigh, Nairobi is the headquarters. Other bases include Forward Operating Base (FOB) Mombasa (Moi International Airport), FOB Mandera, FOB Wajir & FOB Nyeri (mainly helicopters/small planes).

The Kenya Air Force flies some two dozen F-5E/F Tiger II fighters, a dozen Tucano trainers, half a dozen G120A basic trainers.

Kenya also flies small numbers of other different types, such as Pumas, Mi-17s etc. Recent acquisitions include AW139, AS350 FENNEC, UH-1H helicopters, H124M Fennec, MD530Fs and C-27J Spartan transports.

In 2017 Jordan donated 2 confirmed AH-1 Cobra attack helicopters for the air force; these together with the Army's 50th Air Cavalry helicopters are controlled by the Joint Helicopter Command based at Embakasi Garrison.

== History ==
The Kenya Air Force was formed on 1 June 1963, soon after independence, with the assistance of the United Kingdom.

Former aircraft in service included de Havilland Canada Chipmunks and Beavers (since 1964), six Hawker Hunters (bought from RAF, in operation from 1974–79), six BAC Strikemaster fighters (in operation from 1971), and 12 BAE Systems Hawks delivered in 1980. All these types have now been withdrawn.

As a result of the war over the Ogaden region between Ethiopia and Somalia and tensions with neighboring Uganda, the Kenya Air Force ordered 10 F-5Es and 2 F-5Fs in 1976. Deliveries took place in 1978 and give Kenya's air force an interceptor capability for the first time in its history. Two F-5Fs were delivered as attrition replacements in July 1982. From 1979–1982 President Daniel arap Moi used Northrop F-5 fighter jets to escort his flights in and out of the country; later commentators have pointed out that there was no threat justifying the waste of fuel and the difficult and complex requirements of the escort mission.

After a failed coup by a group of Air Force officers on 1 August 1982, the Air Force was disbanded. Air Force activity was reconstituted and placed under tighter army control as the 82 Air Force. The Air Force regained its independent status in 1994.

On 10 April 2006, a KAF Harbin Y-12 crashed near Marsabit with 17 on board, of whom 14 died. It was carrying several local and national politicians; Bonaya Godana, a former minister, was among the casualties. The pilot in command was Major David Njoroge.

Since 1978, the F-5 has been the KAF's main air defence fighter. A total of 29 were delivered: 12 F-5E & 2 F-5F from the US, and 10 F-5E, 3 F-5EM, & 2 F-5F formerly in service with the Royal Jordanian Air Force (RJAF). The ex-RJAF aircraft were upgraded to F-5EM standard before being delivered to the Kenya Air Force. There was controversy over the purchase of the F-5s from Jordan, which were shipped to Kenya and assembled locally, Currently a F-5 upgrade and procurement program is underway for 10 F-5E, 2 F-5F, and 3 F-5EM from Jordan.

The helicopter fleet has been improved thanks to foreign aid. KAF received up to six Royal Jordanian Air Force (RJAF) AH-1Fs in 2017. In 2016 8 Bell Huey II helicopters were approved to be delivered to Kenya Air Force as part of US security cooperation program in sub-Saharan Africa. One of them, UH-1H-II serial KAF-1503, crashed and was written off. The Kenya Air Force 53 Tactical Helicopter Squadron has taken delivery of 6 out of 8 Huey UH-1H helicopters. Meanwhile, the KAF also received 9 AS550C3 helicopters that will be used for security operations as well as combat search and rescue, casualty and medical evacuation. Originally KAF was expected to purchase former UAE AS350Bs, but the new AS550C3s can be armed and may have been also funded by the UAE. By October 2018 photographs had emerged showing the AS550 Fennecs fitted with weapon pylons and unguided rocket pods.

The US government approved a proposed foreign military sale for twelve Air Tractor AT-802L light-attack aircraft to the government of Kenya. As of August 2017, the Kenyan government has not yet signed a contract for the proposed sale. Also, in early 2017, Kenya signed a contract for 3 C 27j & 3 AW 139 to be delivered this year

The United Arab Emirates' Global Aerospace Logistics (GAL) signed an agreement in 2019 with the Kenya Air Force to provide maintenance, repair and overhaul (MRO) services for its aircraft.

== Aircraft ==
=== Current inventory ===
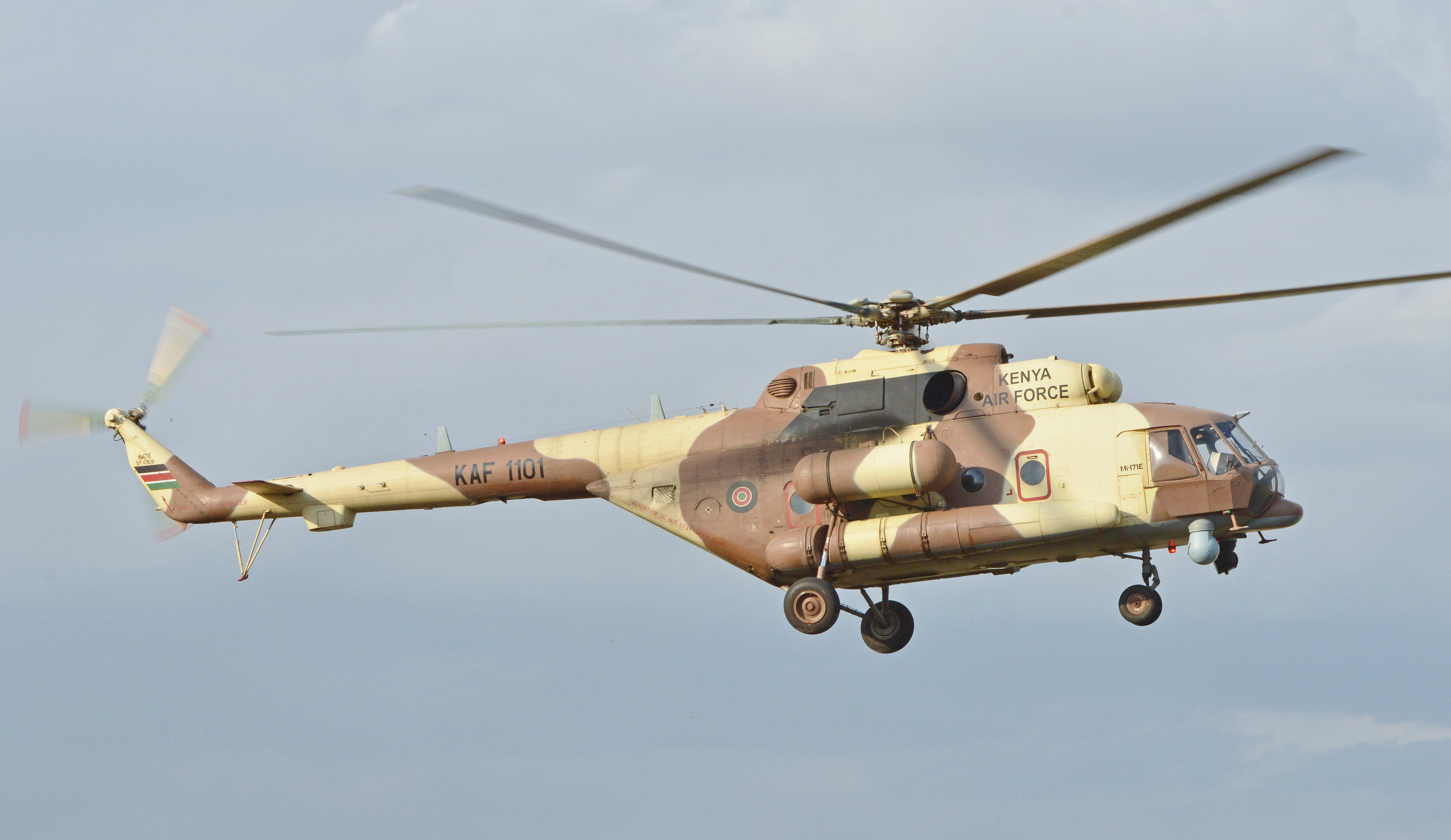
A Mil Mi-171E at Wilson Airport

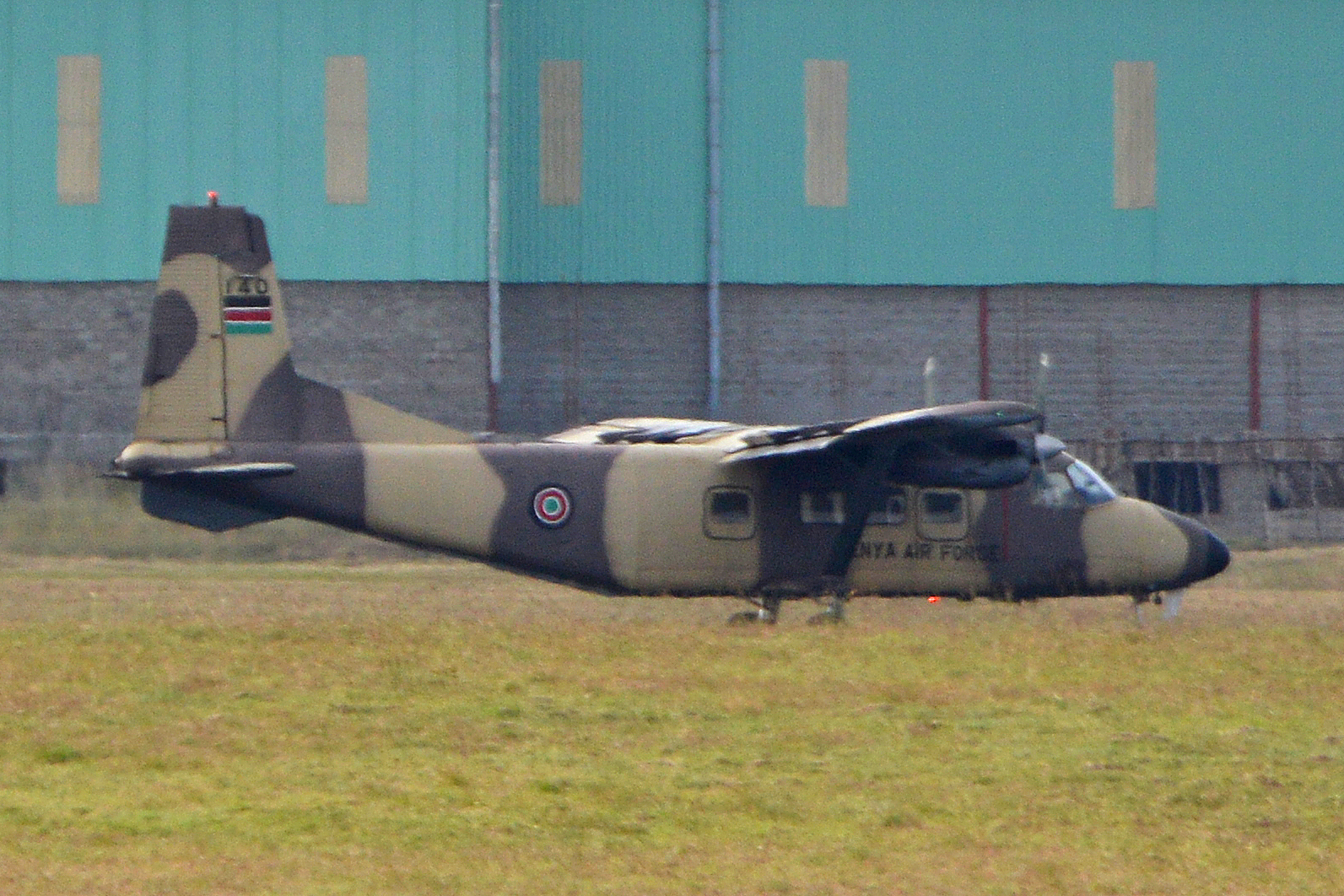
A Kenyan Y-12

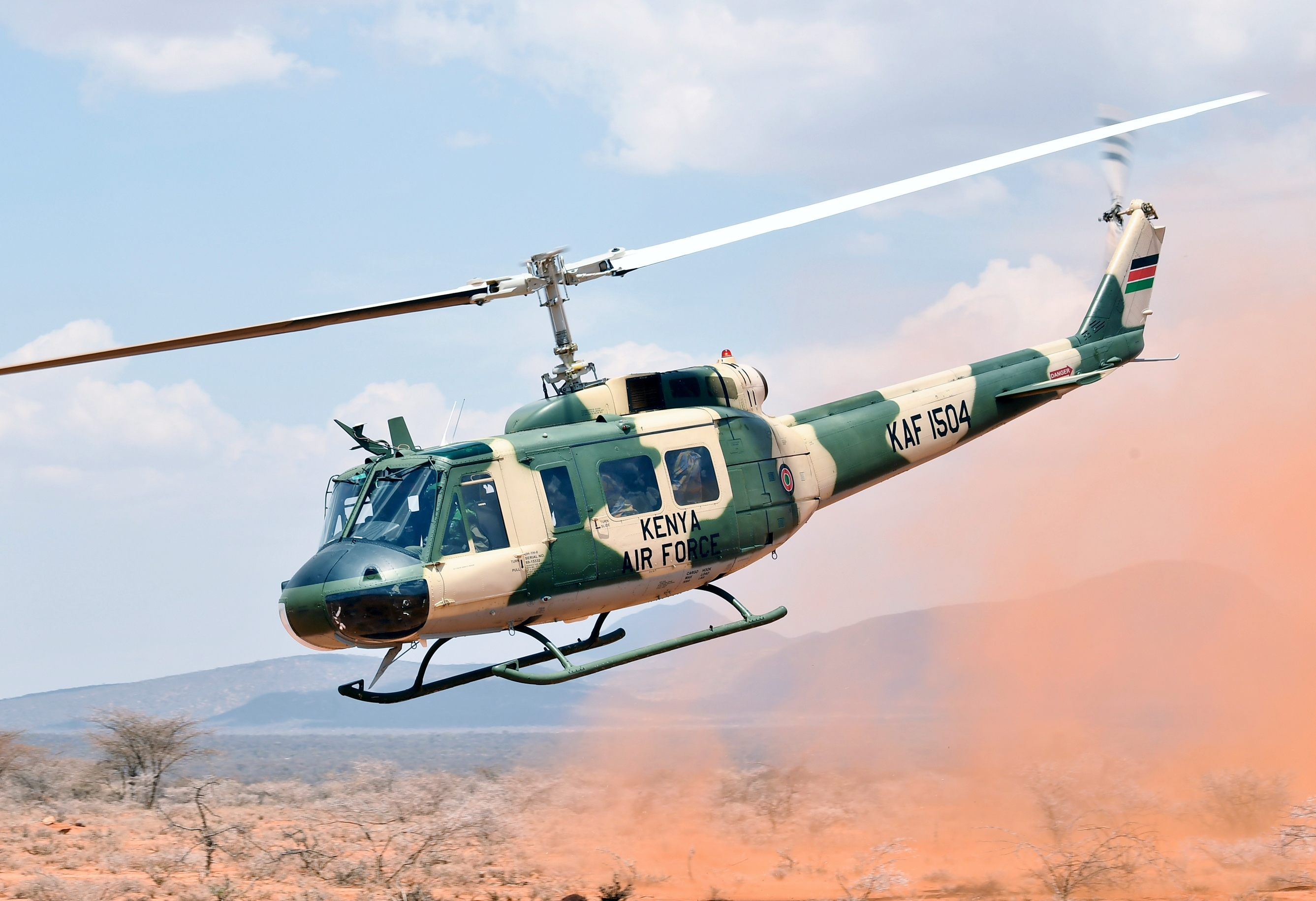
A Kenyan UH-1H Huey

Aircraft	Origin	Type	Variant	In service	Notes
Combat aircraft
Northrop F-5	United States	Fighter	F-5EM F-5FM	23	Six F-5Fs provide conversion training. 18 F-5EM and 5 F-5FM in service at Laikipia Air Base.
Transport
Harbin Y-12	China	Transport		8	
C-27J Spartan	Italy	Transport		3	
Cessna 208	United States	Light utility		4	2 aircraft used for reconnaissance
C-145A Skytruck	Poland	Spec Ops		3	
Fokker 70	Netherlands	VIP transport		1	Still in service as of 2026
Bombardier Dash 8	Canada	VIP transport		3	
Helicopters
Bell UH-1	United States	Utility	UH-1H	5	1 lost Apr 2024. 1 lost Feb 2025.
Bell AH-1	United States	Attack	AH-1F	2	Donated by Jordan
Mil Mi-17	Russia	Transport / Utility	Mi-171	2	
Harbin Z-9	China	Utility		6	
SA 330 Puma IAR 330	France / Romania	Transport / Utility		13/19	
MD 500 Defender	United States	Light attack	530F	45	Kenyan Army helicopters
Eurocopter AS350	France	COIN / Utility		8	
AgustaWestland AW139	Italy	SAR / Utility		3	
Trainer aircraft
Short Tucano	United Kingdom	Trainer	Tucano 51	11	Licence-built variant of the EMB-312
Grob G 120	Germany	Trainer	G 120A & G 120TP	4 & 9	2 G 120TP’s on order as of late 2023. One G 120A crashed Jun 2025.

== Rapid Deployment Squadron ==
The Rapid Deployment Squadron (RDS) is the newest special forces unit among all three branches of the Kenya Defence Forces. It is predominantly tasked with the recovery of downed airmen in hostile territory but it can carry out other specially assigned tasks. The unit was conceived and developed after a downed pilot went missing in action in Southern Somalia. The F5 fighter jet developed mechanical problems and crashed in Al Shabab held territory, while the wreckage was found the pilot remained unaccounted for despite him managing to eject from the aircraft. This led to the need of a tactical quick response unit to respond in such incidences as the search and rescue mission for the downed airman was hampered by the lack of a dedicated response unit.

This Rapid Deployment Squadron is headquartered at Laikipia Air Base where Kenya's main fighter squadron is also based. The unit also maintains a Forward Operating Base at Wajir Airport in North Eastern Kenya.

== See also ==
- Military of Kenya

== Bibliography ==
- Hoyle, Chris (9–15 December 2014). "World Air Forces Directory". Flight International. Vol. 186, no. 5468. pp. 24–55.
- Hoyle, Chris (4–10 December 2018). "World Air Forces Directory". Flight International. Vol. 194, no. 5665. pp. 32–60. ISSN 0015-3710.
