= Kenya Army Infantry =

Principal fighting arms of the Kenya Army

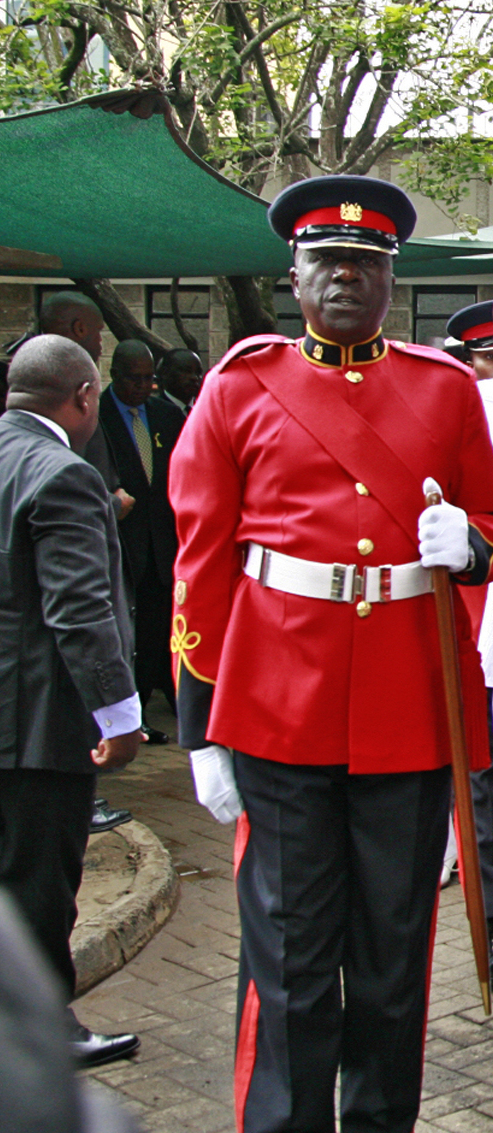
The Kenya Army Infantry service uniform.

The units of the Kenya Army Infantry are the principal fighting arms of the Kenya Army. The primary mission of the Infantry formations is to fight and win land battles within area of operational responsibilities in the defence of the nation against land – based aggression, while the secondary mission is the provision of aid and support to civil authorities in the maintenance of order. The Kenyan School of Infantry (SOI) is located in Isiolo County.

== History ==
In the early 1960s 3rd, 5th, and 11th Battalions of the King's African Rifles (KAR) were based at Nanyuki, Gilgil (in the same town as 3rd Regiment Royal Horse Artillery, which was at Alanbrooke Barracks) and Nairobi (Langata) in rotation.

Timothy Parsons writes:

'..Kenyan political elites viewed the army as a potential source of political leverage. No party or ethnic group was willing to let its rivals gain a dominant position in the armed forces. As a result, veteran askaris worried that politically connected soldiers would replace them. Most of the "martial races" that comprised the old colonial forces were not part of the Kenya African National Union [KANU], and many Kikuyu openly referred to the KAR as the "KADU army." In 1959, the Kalenjin, Kamba, Samburu, and Northern Frontier pastoral communities supplied approximately 77 percent of the total strength of the Kenyan KAR battalions.'

During the Mau Mau rebellion, "B" Company of the KAR's 5th Battalion perpetrated the Chuka massacre in June 1953, killing a number of Kenyan civilians. The massacre was ordered by the company's commanding officer, Major Gerald Selby Lewis Griffiths. On 11 March 1954, Griffiths was found guilty on five counts; he was sentenced to five years in prison and was cashiered from the Army.

Three KAR battalions were transferred to Kenya upon independence (at midnight on 12 December 1963). Thus 3 KAR, 5 KAR, and 11 KAR became 3 Kenya Rifles, 5 Kenya Rifles, and 11 Kenya Rifles. Their middle and senior ranks were filled almost entirely by regular British officers.

Army mutinies in Tanganyika and Uganda in January 1964 set the stage for the unrest that took place within the Kenya Rifles. Faced with many of the same problems that confronted Kenyan soldiers, Tanganyika Rifles and Ugandan soldiers won improved pay and the dismissal of expatriate British officers by threatening their newly sovereign politicians with violence. On the evening of 24 January 1964, the failure of the Kenyan Prime Minister to appear on television, where 11th Kenya Rifles junior soldiers had been expecting a televised speech and hoping for a pay rise announcement, caused the men to mutiny. Parsons says it is possible that the speech was only broadcast on the radio in the Nakuru area where Lanet Barracks, home of the battalion, was located. Kenyatta's government held two separate courts-martial for 43 soldiers.

In the aftermath of the mutiny and following courts-martial, the 11th Kenya Rifles was disbanded. A new battalion, 1st Kenya Rifles, was created entirely from 340 Lanet soldiers who had been cleared of participation in the mutiny by the Kenyan Criminal Investigations Division (CID).

7 Kenya Rifles was formed in 1969, and 9 Kenya Rifles was formed in 1979. 15 Kenya Rifles was formed in 1989, and, afterwards, 17 and 19 Kenya Rifles.

== Battalions of the Kenya Rifles ==
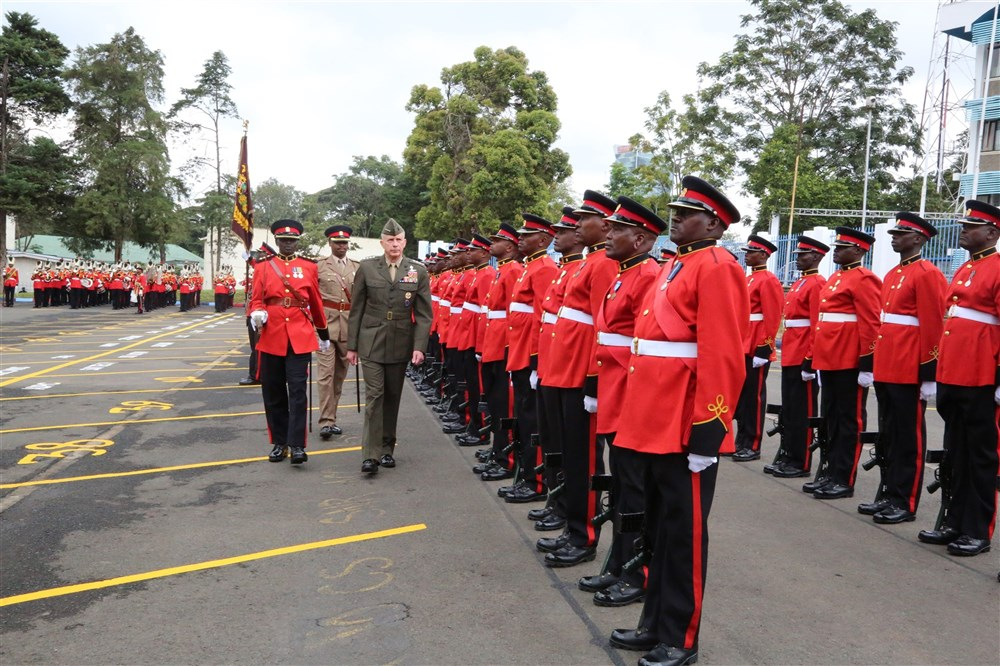
U.S. Marine Corps General Thomas D. Waldhauser, Commander, Africa Command, inspects a guard of honour during a visit to Nairobi in 2007.

- 1st Kenya Rifles Battalion – Nanyuki. Lieutenant K.A. Webi of 1 Kenya Rifles, who was commissioned into the Kenya Army in May 2009, died in the line of duty on 22 January when his unit conducted a raid on al Shabaab camps in Delbiyow and Hosingow.
- 3 Kenya Rifles – Lanet Barracks, Nakuru. Another officer who was injured on 22 January 2012 incident and had been undergoing treatment at the hospital, Lieutenant Edward Okoyo attached to the 3rd Kenya Rifles, also later died. He had only served for one-and-a-half years. He had been commissioned into the KDF on 30 June 2010. Four AK-47 rifles, a large amount of ammunition, communication equipment and a collapsible water tank were recovered during the raid in which 11 al-Shabaab fighters were reportedly killed.
- 5th Kenya Rifles – Gilgil. The battalion was formed on 1 January 1930 in Nairobi. 5th Kenya Rifles was the first battalion to be deployed to the North Eastern Province to counter Somali separatists during the Shifta War. The unit gained repute in the Kenya Army for its performance in combat with Second Lieutenant D.P. Magonga among those cited during the first honours list. In March 2009 in the aftermath of the Mount Elgon insurgency members of the 20th Parachute Battalion were transferred to the 5 Kenya Rifles prior to investigations on human rights abuses during the operation.
- 7 Kenya Rifles – Langata Barracks, Nairobi. It was formed in 1968-69 and was previously located at Gilgil in a camp formerly held by British Army troops (possibly 3rd Regiment Royal Horse Artillery which had left five years earlier). The first task of the unit was to clean and repair the camp. The battalion moved to Langata in 1973.
- 9 Kenya Rifles – Moi Barracks, Eldoret. It was formed on 1 September 1979. The original troops of the battalion were drawn from other existing infantry units such as the 3rd, 5th, and 7th Kenya Rifles Battalion. President Daniel arap Moi presented it with its colours on 12 December 1980. The first Commanding officer of the unit was Lt Col Daniel Opande. The unit trooped its colours for the first time on Jamhuri Day 2001. It took part in Exercise Natural Fire in 2006. The 9th Battalion Kenya Rifles mounted a guard of honour in honour the 12th Parliament Opening on 12 September 2017.
- 15 Battalion Kenya Rifles (15 KR), nicknamed the One five, was the seventh infantry battalion in the Kenya Army. It was formed on 13 March 1989. The unit was conceived as a Kenya contingent for dispatch to the United Nations Transitional Assistance Group (UNTAG) in Namibia circa 1990. On return from Namibia the unit was constituted as a fully fledged infantry unit, to be based in the outskirts of the coastal city of Mombasa at Mariakani Barracks.
- At the time of the Battle of Kulbiyow (27 January 2017) against Al Shabaab, the Kulbiyow base in Jubaland, Somalia, was held by 250 Kenyan and Somali soldiers. The core of the base garrison was formed by C Company, 15 KR of 120 men, organized into four platoons. The Kenyan company also included a howitzer battery as well as several mortars.

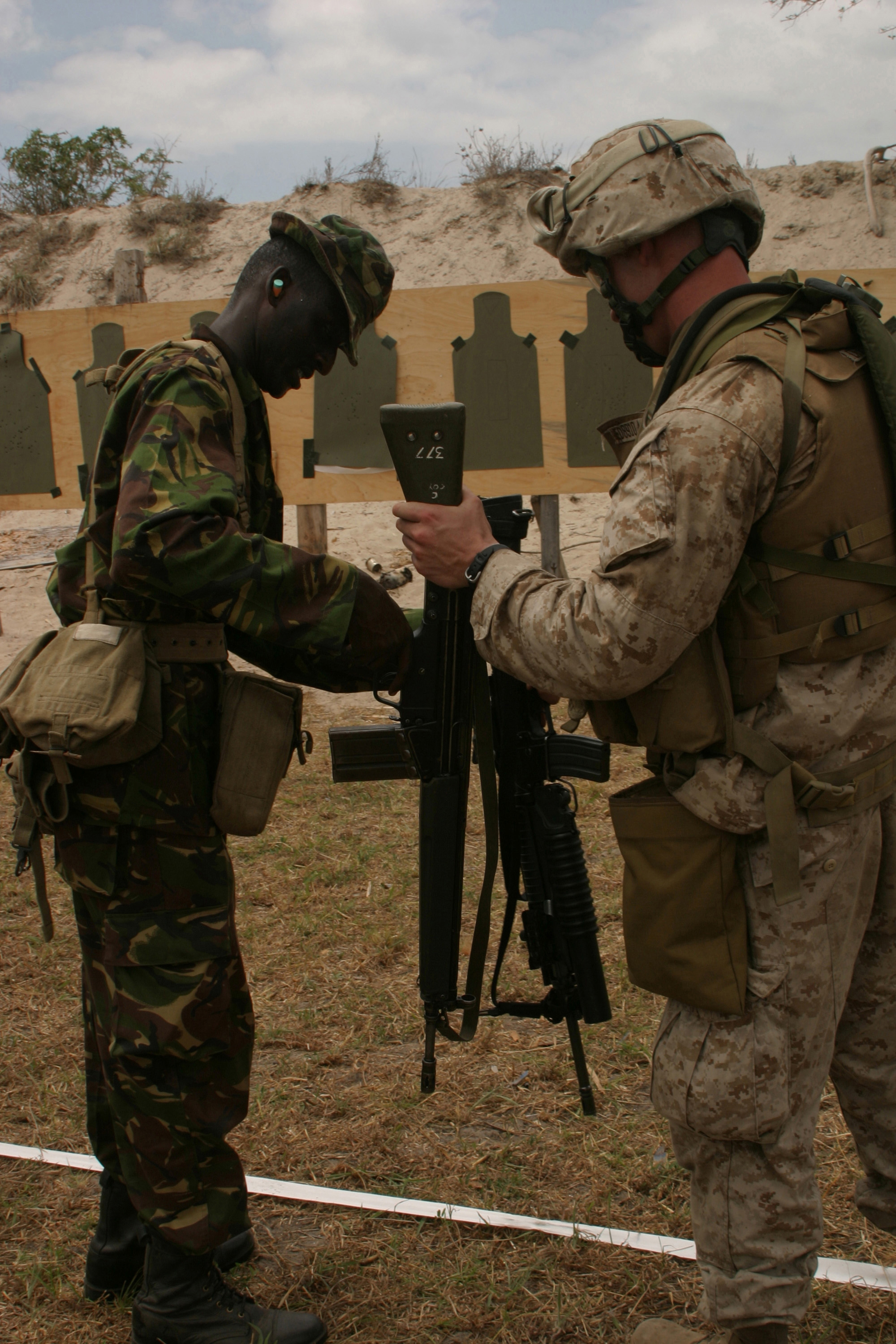
United States Marine Corps Sergeant Edward Deptola exchanges his M16 rifle for a G3 rifle with a soldier from 15 Kenya Rifles in March 2007.

- 17 Kenya Rifles – previously based at Nyali, Mombasa, and popularly known as the Desert Rangers due to their unit colour being desert brown. They received their presidential colours during the 55th Jamhuri Day celebrations on 12 December 2018, and relocated to their new home in Modika, Garissa County. 17 Battalion has served on the Kenyan Coast, in North Eastern, and several times with the African Union Mission in Somalia (tours AMISOM III, V and VI in 2014, 2016 and 2017). Standard Media relayed the KDF saying that the 'combat team [had] neutralised an Al-Shabaab camp at Hagar, 50 kilometres North East of Afmadhow".
- 19 Kenya Rifles – established in 2013 [or 28 June 2011?], the battalion was founded most recently. It is currently located in Nanyuki, and is popularly known as the Ash Warriors.

=== Casualties in Somalia ===
Raymond Kirui, attached to 7 Kenya Rifles, who joined the Kenya Defence Forces on 25 October 2010, died on 24 November 2011 when the vehicle he and 13 other soldiers were travelling in drove over an improvised explosive device in Bulla Garaay area near Mandera. Lance Corporal Willie Njoroge attached to the 1st Kenya Rifles died during a confrontation between his unit and al Shabaab fighters in Somalia on 29 December 2011. His unit had raided the al Qaeda linked insurgents base south of Beles Qooqani when he was killed. Five al Shabaab fighters were killed and many others injured during the incident. He joined the Kenya Defence Forces on 3 August 2002.

Others who have been killed are Yusuf Abdullah Korio, a private in the 15th Kenya Rifles. Korio joined the military in 1992 and died during combat on 22 December last year (2011) when during fighting between Tabda and Dhobley. Ronald Kipkemboi Kiptui, who joined the army on 29 October 2007 and was attached to the 7th Kenya Rifles, died on 3 December 2011.

Kenya lost 15 soldiers in the first 100 days in Somalia after the beginning of Operation Linda Nchi, amongst them 2 Majors and 4 Lieutenants. Major Samuel Keli Kavindu and Major Kizito Wahiza Nyamahonga both of the Joint Helicopter Command were both commissioned in 1997 and perished when their helicopter crashed near Liboi on the night of the 16th of October 2011 at around 7pm, just 14 kilometers from the Kenya-Somalia border, marking the first high profile deaths of the KDF operation.

== Other infantry units ==
There are three other infantry units in the Kenya Army that are not necessarily part of the Kenya Rifles; 20 Parachute Battalion, and the two special operations units, 30 Special Forces Battalion and 40 Ranger Strike Force Battalion. These units make up the Army Special Operations Brigade (Kenya).

In addition, 50th Air Cavalry Battalion was a unique unit flying Hughes 500s which may have some airmobile infantry capability.
