= 1st Kenya Rifles Battalion =

1st Kenya Rifles
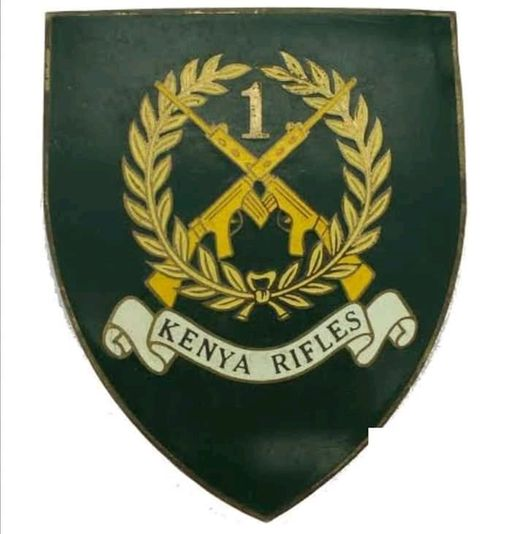
- Active: 1964
- Country: Kenya
- Branch: Kenya Army
- Type: Infantry
- Role: Light Infantry
- Garrison/HQ: Nanyuki
- Colors: Green
- March: Tufunge Safari
- Engagements: First World War; Second World War; Shifta War; Operation Linda Nchi; African Union Mission in Somalia

1st Kenya Rifles is an infantry battalion of the Kenya Army. It is a descendant of the pre-independence Kenya British Army formation the Kings African Rifles that was formed before the First World War.

== History ==
As the country prepared for independence in 1962–63 the National Assembly of Kenya passed a bill (Kenya Bills 1963) to amend the status of Kenyan military forces. Three battalions of the KAR were in country (3, 5, and 11 KAR). Accordingly, former KAR units of them were transformed into Kenyan military forces and the newly independent Kenyan Government was legally empowered to assign names to them. This took effect from the time of the independence ceremonies, midnight, 12 December 1963. Thus 3 KAR, 5 KAR, and 11 KAR became 3 Kenya Rifles, 5 Kenya Rifles, and 11 Kenya Rifles. The battalion led by Lieutenant Colonel Joshua Karigo participated in independent Kenya's first parade in December 12 1964 as the country became a republic

Mutinies by the Tanganyika Rifles and the Uganda Rifles in January 1964 set the stage for the unrest that took place within the Kenya Rifles. Faced with many of the same problems that confronted Kenyan soldiers, Tanganyikan and Ugandan soldiers won improved pay and the dismissal of expatriate British officers by threatening their newly sovereign politicians with violence. On the evening of 24 January 1964, the failure of the Kenyan Prime Minister to appear on television, where 11th Kenya Rifles junior soldiers had been expecting a televised speech and hoping for a pay rise announcement, caused the men to mutiny. Parsons says it is possible that the speech was only broadcast on the radio in the Nakuru area where Lanet Barracks, home of the battalion, was located. Kenyatta's government held two separate courts-martial for 43 soldiers.

In the aftermath of the mutiny and following courts-martial, the 11th Kenya Rifles was disbanded.

A new battalion, 1st Kenya Rifles, was created entirely from 340 Lanet soldiers who had been cleared of participation in the mutiny by the Kenyan Criminal Investigations Division (CID). Today this unit is based in Nanyuki, Central Kenya. The battalion is currently allied with The Light Infantry of the British Army.

== Operations ==
The battalion saw action during the Shifta War and it is credited with the formulation of present-day anti banditry operations due its performance in areas like Isiolo, Merti and Garbatulla during the conflict. The battalion further gained repute when it recovered huge caches of weaponry during the Boka Wells operations in 1996. The unit has also been deployed to Southern Somalia under Operation Linda Nchi
