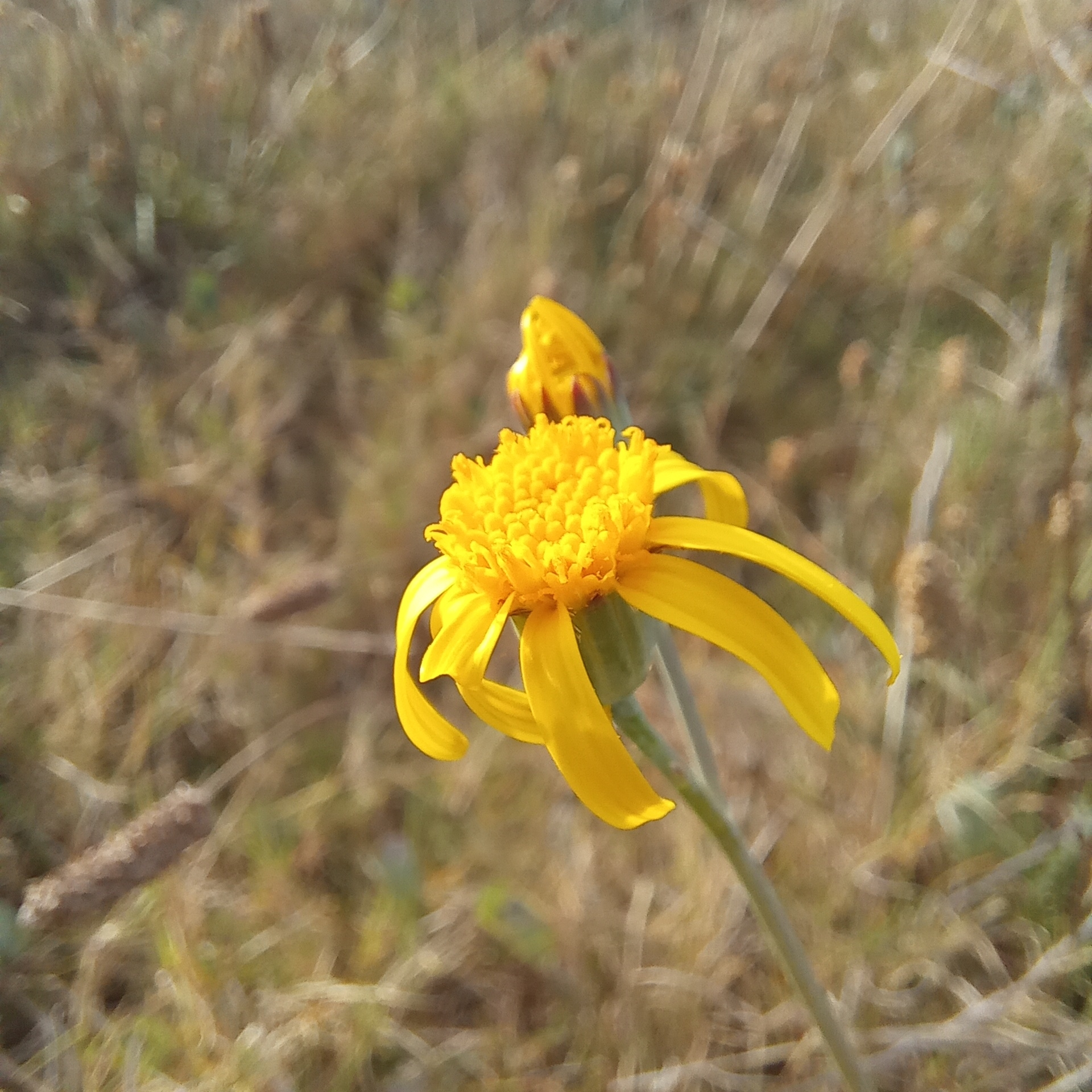

Scientific classification
- Kingdom: Plantae
- Clade: Tracheophytes
- Clade: Angiosperms
- Clade: Eudicots
- Clade: Asterids
- Order: Asterales
- Family: Asteraceae
- Genus: Senecio
- Species: S. ruwenzoriensis

Binomial name
- Senecio ruwenzoriensis S.Moore

Synonyms
- Senecio othonniformis Fourc.; Senecio paucifolius DC.

= Senecio ruwenzoriensis =

Species of plant from southern and tropical Africa

Senecio ruwenzoriensis is an African species of plant. While it is widely distributed, it seems to be highly localised in this range.

== Description ==
This perennial herb grows up to 75 cm (2.46 ft) tall. The leaves are hairless and somewhat fleshy. They have sparse teeth and are elongated ovals with rounded tips. They have three veins from the base of the leaf. The margins have hardened teeth. The roots are tuberous.

The flowers (both the ray and the disc florets) are bright yellow in colour. The round flower heads have 8–10 rays and 10–12 leathery bracts. They are borne in loose, flat inflorescences and held on long stems. The flower stems are leafy at the base. The dry, single seeded fruits are cylindrical and ribbed. In South Africa, they are present between December and May.

== Distribution and habitat ==
This species has a large distribution but seems to be highly localised within its range. It ranges from Swellendam in South Africa to tropical Africa. It is found in South Africa, Lesotho, Zimbabwe, Malawi, Mozambique, Zambia, Tanzania, Kenya, Uganda and Sudan. It is found growing in grasslands and shrublands, especially around rocky outcrops. It is also found growing on grassy slopes. The plants growing in South Africa were originally considered to be a different species from those growing in Kenya (with those growing in South Africa being referred to as Senecio othonniformis. They were, however, found to contain the same alkaloids The South African populations were then included in Senecio ruwenzoriensis.

== Toxicity ==
It was suspected that this species was poisoning that cattle that were eating it in the Nanyuki district of Kenya. Two potential alkaloids (ruwenine and ruzorine) were extracted and compared to retrosine (another Senecio alkaloid) in rats. While both of the alkaloids found in Senecio ruwenzoriensis were found to cause liver damage, ruwenine was the more potent of the two. It was more harmful to the rats than retrosine, while ruzorine was less harmful than retrosine.
