= Mount Kenya Wildlife Conservancy =

Non-profit trust in Kenya

- Abbreviation: MKWC
- Formation: 2004
- Type: Nonprofit Trust
- Location: Nanyuki, Kenya
- Website: https://mountkenyawildlifeconservancy.org/

Mount Kenya Wildlife Conservancy, abbreviated to MKWC is a non-profit trust dedicated to preserving the environment and the wildlife within.

The Conservancy is located in Nanyuki, a UN World Heritage Site, and an important and rich biodiverse area. It is home to 28 different animal species, with a population of roughly 1,200 different animals.

The Conservancy's three main programmes include a breeding and rewilding project for the critically endangered Mountain Bongo antelope, an animal orphanage, and a conservation education programme.

As poaching increased in the 1950s and 60s, a reserve was set up to protect orphaned animals, which today has evolved into MKWC. It has become essential in the fight to protect and increase the numbers of wild Mountain Bongo, a critically endangered species; Working with the Kenya Government Kenya Wildlife Service National Mountain Bongo Recovery and Action Plan 2019 – 2023.

Mount Kenya Wildlife Conservancy is a member of IUCN International Union for Conservation of Nature – one of only 13 Kenyan conservancies to be granted this status.

Many other animals are also located at the conservancy which allows for the reintroduction of animals. In November 2023, giraffes were reintroduced to Mount Kenya for the first time in 40 years.
