= Battle of Kulbiyow =

2017 battle of the Somali Civil War

Coordinates: 1.1357°S 41.2225°E

- Part of the War in Somalia
- An Al-Shabaab fighter inside the Kulbiyow military base following the battle.
Date	27 January 2017
Location	Kulbiyow, Somalia–Kenya border
Result	Major Al-Shabaab victory

Belligerents
al-Qaeda; al-Shabaab	AMISOM: Kenya; Federal Government of Somalia

Commanders and leaders
Unknown	(Kenya) Maj. Denis Girenge (WIA) (Company OC) (Kenya) Maj. Mwangi † (Artillery Battery Commander) (Kenya) Capt. Silas Ekidor † (Infantry Second Officer in Charge) (Somalia) Capt. Nur Muhidin (Somali commander)

Units involved
Saleh al Nabhan Battalion	Kenya Army: 15 Kenya Rifles; C-Company; (Somalia) Somali Armed Forces

Strength
150–Hundreds (Note: The KDF claimed that 1,000 militants attacked the camp. Another estimate put the number at 500.): Many foreign mujahideen	250: (Kenya) 120; (Somalia) Unknown

Casualties and losses
Unknown (Note: Locals said "dozens" of militants had been killed, while the KDF claimed that Al-Shabaab had lost 70 fighters. One KDF corporal even claimed to have seen at least 200 dead insurgents at the base.)	(Kenya) 40–67+ (Note: The KDF initially claimed that only nine Kenyans had died during the fighting, but later admitted that at least 21 soldiers had been killed and 44 wounded. On the other side, local residents estimated that around 40 Kenyans had been killed, while around 50 dead soldiers could be seen in Al-Shabaab propaganda videos of the attack; Al-Shabaab itself first claimed to have killed 51 soldiers, though later raised this number to over 67.) KDF soldiers killed, several captured (Somalia) Several killed

The Battle of Kulbiyow took place on 27 January 2017, when al-Shabaab militants attacked and took control of the military base and town of Kulbiyow, held by the Somali Armed Forces and the Kenya Defence Forces (KDF).

== Background ==
Kulbiyow was an important military base directly at the Somalia–Kenya border, and was operated as part of the African Union Mission to Somalia's (AMISOM) Sector 2 which was entrusted to the Kenya Defence Forces. Al-Shabaab began operating around Kulbiyow in November 2016; Somali media alleged that the Kenyan security forces were warned that the insurgents were planning a major attack in the area. Al-Shabaab's internal security force Amniyat later claimed that about 150 rebels gathered near Hulugho in preparation for this operation.

On 25 January 2017, the Kenyan troops from Kulbiyow attacked a base of Al-Shabaab at Badhadhe, though the attack was repelled. On the next day, the Kenyans received intelligence about an impending counter-attack by the Jihadists, so that soldiers were sent on scouting missions to help gather more information and to prepare Kulbiyow's defences. At the time, the base was held by 250 Kenyan and Somali soldiers. The core of the base garrison was formed by the 15 Kenya Rifles' C Company of 120 men, organized into four platoons. The Kenyan company also included a howitzer battery as well as several mortars.

When the attack eventually began on the night of 26–27 January, it was launched from Badhadhe, and was led by the Saleh al-Nabhan Battalion, an Al-Shabaab unit which had already won some renown by partaking in the major Islamist victory of El Adde in the previous year. Furthermore, several of the attackers were reportedly Arab foreign mujahideen, who appeared to be especially well trained and battle-hardened.

== Battle ==
When Al-Shabaab forces began moving towards Kulbiyow, they were spotted by an AMISOM surveillance drone around midnight; in response, the Kenyans at Kulbiyow began firing mortars and artillery at the militants. This bombardment lasted about 50 minutes, whereupon the base's defenders assumed that they had repelled the Al-Shabaab fighters, and resumed their normal routines.

Around 5am, about 20 minutes after the Kenyans had assumed victory, the drone spotted more militants approaching the base. This al-Shabaab assault was spearheaded by two vehicle-borne improvised explosive devices (VBIEDs). The renewed attack caught the defenders largely by surprise. The Kenyans destroyed one VBIED before it reached the base, but another explosive-laden truck that was driven by an Al-Shabaab suicide bomber was able to reach their position. Though the car bomb was finally destroyed by a Kenyan soldier who fired an 84mm anti-tank gun at it, the vehicle had already breached the base's outer perimeter by this point. Its explosion caused many losses to the Kenyans. An infantry strike force, between 150 and a few hundred militants strong, then stormed the base, supported by mobile artillery and technicals. A brutal and confusing firefight began. Captain Silas Ekidor, the Kenyan second-in-command, attempted to reorganise the defences and rallied several soldiers to his position but was killed by a second car bomb. The Artillery Battery commander, Major Mwangi, was also killed at some point during the fighting. Meanwhile, two of the four Kenyan platoons present had begun to retreat under the orders of their commanders, leaving the two other platoons alone to face the attackers. Researcher Jacob Beeders argued that this move sealed the base's fate, but also prevented the garrison from being entirely overrun.

Soon after, the base's inner defences were breached by a third bomb-laden truck, whose explosion allowed the Al-Shabaab fighters to overrun the remaining defenders; the surviving pro-government forces were forced to flee into the bush, as the militants pursued them. The battle had lasted around 90 minutes, with al-Shabaab later claiming to have killed more than 67 KDF soldiers and capture several more. Accordingly, the two retreating platoons survived, while the two units which had remained at the base and continued to fight were almost completely destroyed.

"Indeed, Allah has promised you much spoils of war."

— Quote from Al-Fath, used by Al-Shabaab to describe the battle's outcome.

With the retreat of the pro-government forces, Al-Shabaab was left in full control of both the base as well as the nearby town, and the insurgents proceeded to take vehicles and supplies while burning the military vehicles they could not use. The garrison had called for help, and nearby Kenyan security forces mobilized to assist, but the rebels had mined the roads leading to Kulbiyow, causing losses to the reinforcements and delaying their advance. Meanwhile, Kenyan Harbin Z-9 attack helicopters arrived at the battle site and began to fire at the militants, forcing them to scatter, though the insurgents appeared to have been able to withdraw with much loot in good order. Hours later, Kenyan ground forces arrived at Kulbiyow and took possession of the military base.

== Aftermath ==
The KDF later denied the high number of killed Kenyan soldiers as Al-Shabaab propaganda, with one KDF spokesman even refusing to admit that the base had fallen in the first place: "[Kenyan] soldiers repulsed the terrorists, killing scores." The Kenyan government even tried to portray the battle as victory for the KDF, which was disproven as soon as eyewitness reports emerged. A Somali officer who had survived the attack, however, described the battle as "disaster", while a Kenyan officer who arrived at Kulbiyow after the battle said "it was a horrendous scene" in regard to the many killed soldiers lying around.

The attack was believed by analysts to have primarily been a propaganda coup by Al-Shabaab, which wanted not only to prove that it still was "a force to be reckoned with", but possibly also influence the upcoming elections in Kenya, where the mission in Somalia was increasingly questioned due to high casualties among the KDF. Directly after the Kulbiyow raid, Kenyan opposition leader Raila Odinga once again reaffirmed his position that the KDF should retreat from Somalia.
