= 9 Kenya Rifles =

9th Kenya Rifles
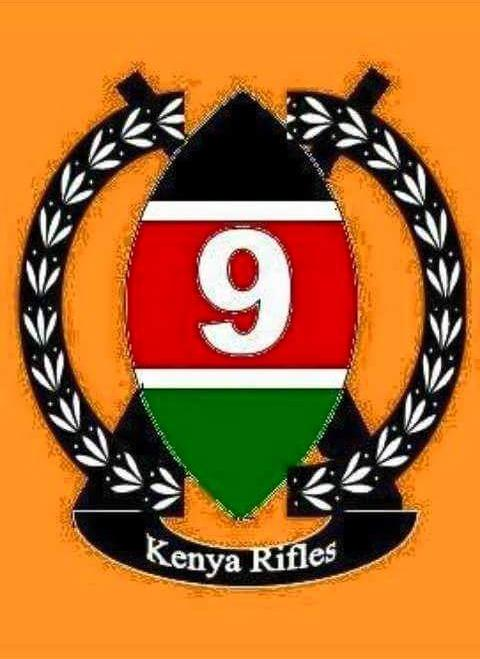
- Insignia of the 9th Battalion, Kenya Rifles
- Active: 1979
- Country: Kenya
- Branch: Kenya Army
- Type: Infantry
- Role: Light Infantry
- Garrison/HQ: Eldoret
- Colours: Orange
- Engagements: Operation Linda Nchi; African Union Mission in Somalia; Battle of Kismayo (2012); Battle of El Adde

The 9th Battalion, Kenya Rifles is a light infantry battalion of the Kenya Army headquartered at Moi Barracks near Eldoret.

== Background ==
The 9th Battalion was formed on 1 September 1979 when its members were pooled from existing Kenya Rifles Battalions. The unit was presented with its Presidential and Regimental colours in 1980 by President Daniel Arap Moi. The battalion is part of the Kenya Army's Western Command and covers the western parts of Kenya from external and internal aggression. The unit's first commanding officer was Lieutenant Colonel Daniel Opande.

== Experience ==
The unit took part in Exercise Natural Fire in 2006 with allied countries and has seen extensive action in southern Somalia against Al Shabaab and was among the units that participated in the Battle of Kismayo (2012). The operation codenamed Operation Sledgehammer led to the capture of the city in an amphibious and ground operation. The unit was also involved in the largest ambush in the Kenya Army's history in El Adde. The company manning the forward operating base was drawn from the 9th Battalion under Major Geoffrey Obwage. The unit trooped its colours for the first time during Jamhuri Day celebrations on December 12, 2001.
