= Collapsible tank =

Container

Collapsible tanks are used for storage of fuel, water, or chemicals and are manufactured using industrial fabrics.

Collapsible tanks are manufactured in a variety of sizes and styles, with various fabrics available depending on the liquid being contained. They are assembled using fabric welding techniques such as hot air, hot bar, and radio-frequency (RF) welding.

In contrast to steel tanks, collapsible fabric tanks can be relatively easily and quickly transported, unfolded, and deployed–features that make them a logical choice for applications in remote sites (such as mining exploration camps) and temporary installations (such as military operations).

Collapsible tanks have been used successfully in the Arctic, where challenges such as climate, location, and logistics costs make other tank types impractical.

A number of manufacturers produce collapsible fabric tanks for general-purpose use.

== Gallery ==
Transport of a folded collapsible tank

Unfolding of a collapsible tank

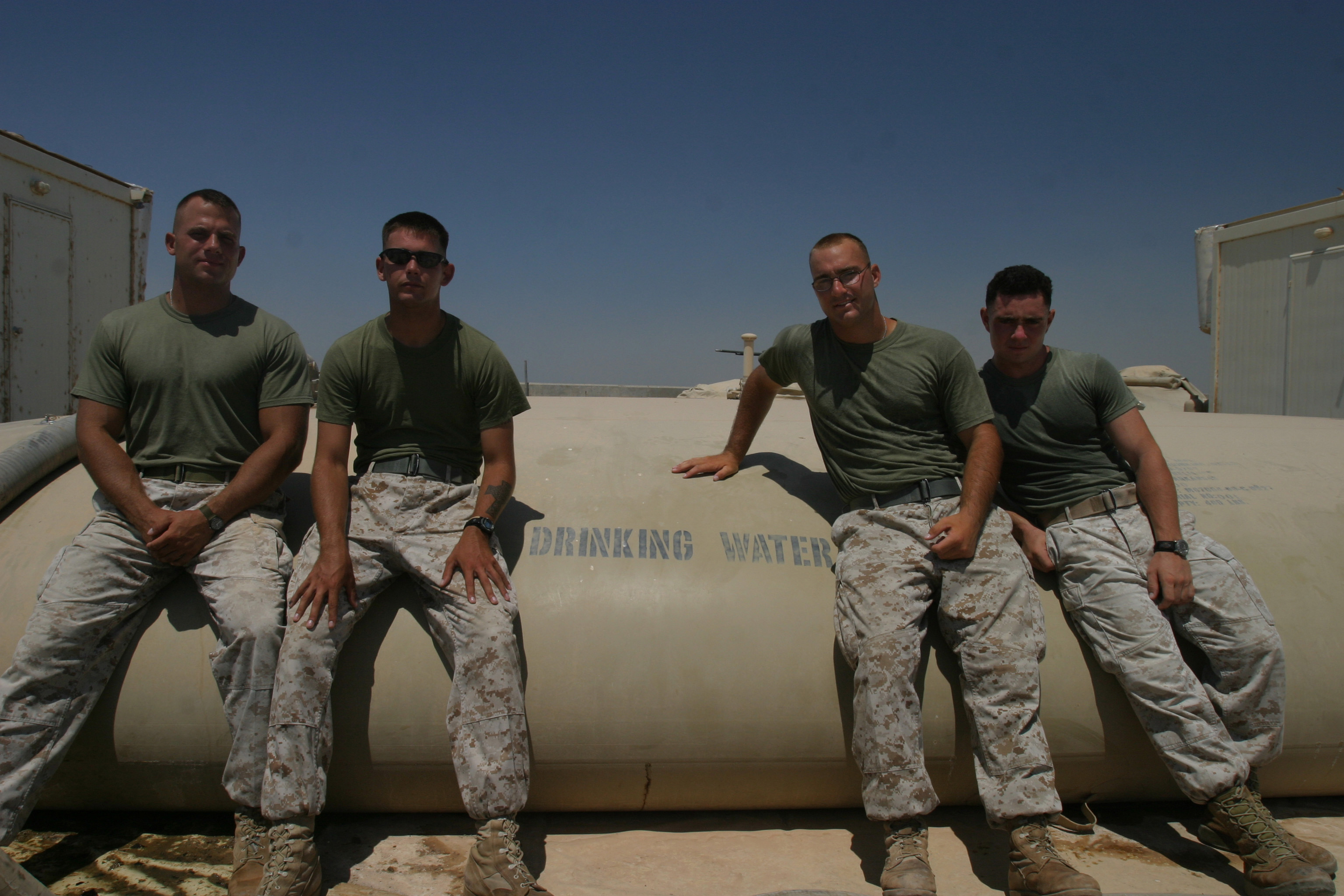
A collapsible tank in use

Draining of a collapsible tank
