= Daniel Opande =

Kenyan former military commander

Daniel Ishmael Opande
- Education: Mons Officer Cadet School; National Defense University; Staff College, Camberley
- Military career
- Allegiance: Kenya
- Branch: Kenya Army
- Rank: Lieutenant General
- Commands: Commandant National Defence College; Deputy Force Commander United Nations Transitional Assistance Group; Chief Military Observer United Nations Observer Mission in Liberia; Commanding Officer 9 Kenya Rifles

Daniel Ishmael Opande (born 18 August 1943) is a retired Kenyan military officer, who rose to the rank of Lieutenant General in the Kenyan Army.

== Education ==
He is a graduate of the British Army's Mons Officer Cadet School, which he joined in 1963. Opande was commissioned as a Second Lieutenant on graduating from Mons in May 1964. Opande is also a graduate of the British Army's Staff College, Camberley and the U.S. National Defense University at Fort Lesley J. McNair, Washington DC.

== Career ==
In 1979 he became the first commanding officer of 9 Kenya Rifles, a newly formed infantry battalion. Opande later served as Deputy Force Commander with the United Nations Transitional Assistance Group in Namibia (UNTAG) from 1989 to 1990. Before serving as UNTAG DFC, he had been the Kenyan Army's director of operations. He represented the Kenyan government in the negotiation of the Mozambique peace process from 1990 to 1993. He then was sent to Liberia as the Chief Military Observer of the United Nations Observer Mission in Liberia (UNOMIL) from 1993 to 1995. From 1995 to 2000, General Opande appears to have filled posts in Kenya, and likely served as Commandant of the National Defence College, Kenya's highest military institution, during that period. In 1998, General Opande, listed in Chinese sources as president of the Institute for National Defence, visited the People's Republic of China.

In 2000, General Opande was serving as Kenya's Vice-Chief of General Staff. He was appointed as Force Commander of the United Nations Mission in Sierra Leone (UNAMSIL) in November 2000. He served as UNAMSIL Force Commander until 2003. In a letter to the UN Security Council dated 29 September 2003, the UN Secretary-General advised that Opande was to be appointed Force Commander of the newly established United Nations Mission in Liberia (UNMIL). General Opande said in early 2004 that communications between the three UN peacekeeping missions in Sierra Leone, Liberia, and Côte d'Ivoire were quite good, and that the contact permitted exchanges of ideas at the highest level. He served as UNMIL Force Commander from 2003 to 2005. After that point, he appears to have retired.

General Opande commented upon the establishment of the United States Africa Command in June 2008. He said "Very little was really known by the majority of people or countries in Africa who were supposed to know before such a move was made," meaning that significant doubt was created as to the United States' actual intentions.

== Legacy ==
In September 2008, General Opande donated a number of pieces of personal memorabilia to the Kenya National Archives.
