= Nanyuki =

- Town
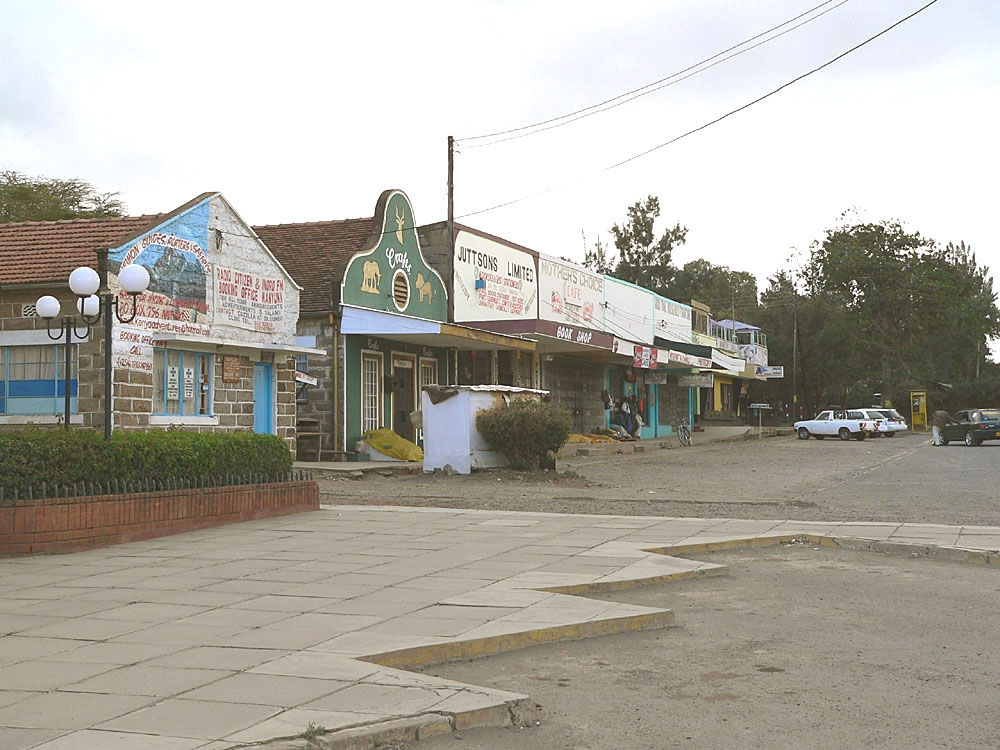
- The main street of Nanyuki

- Location in Kenya
- Coordinates: 0°01′N 37°04′E
- Country: Kenya
- County: Laikipia County
- Established: 1907

Government
  - Municipality Manager: Anthony Rukwaro

Population (2019)
  - Total: 72,813
- Time zone: East African Time
- Postal code: 10400
- Website: https://nanyukimunicipality.go.ke/

Nanyuki is a market town in Laikipia County, Kenya, located northwest of Mount Kenya along the A2 road and at the terminus of the branch railway from Nairobi. The name is derived from the Maasai word "Enyaanyukie," which means "resemblance."

It lies just north of the Equator (0° 01' N). British immigrants settled in Nanyuki in 1907, and some of their descendants still live in and around the town. Nanyuki hosts the main airbase of the Kenya Air Force. The British Army Training Unit Kenya (BATUK), has a base at Nyati Barracks. It conducts infantry training in Laikipia and on the Kenyan Ministry of Defence land at Archer's Post.

== History ==
Maasai herders found red ochre in Nanyuki, the ground resembled roan coated cattle. The town saw British immigrants settle there during the early days of colonial Kenya in 1907. Some of their descendants still live in or around the town. Major Digby Tatham-Warter, a British Army officer famed for carrying an umbrella into battle, moved to Nanyuki after World War II and lived on his farm until his death in 1993. During the Mau Mau Uprising, Digby raised a volunteer mounted police force at his own expense and led them against the Mau Mau.

The town is noted for small- and large-scale farms, ranches and pastoral lands, and wildlife conservancies. Nanyuki is also the base for people seeking to climb Mount Kenya. The town sits almost on the Equator, an Equator sign was erected by the government of Kenya beside the A2 road.

Nanyuki Civil Airfield was once the location of the No. 1340 Flight RAF, which flew Harvards during the Mau Mau Uprising.

== Climate ==
Nanyuki is relatively cool year-round, experiences weakly trimodal rainfall, with a distinct dry season in January and February.

Climate data for Nanyuki
Month	Jan	Feb	Mar	Apr	May	Jun	Jul	Aug	Sep	Oct	Nov	Dec	Year
Mean daily maximum °C (°F)	25 (77)	26 (79)	25 (77)	23 (74)	23 (73)	23 (74)	22 (72)	23 (73)	24 (76)	24 (75)	23 (73)	23 (74)	24 (75)
Mean daily minimum °C (°F)	7 (45)	8 (47)	9 (49)	11 (51)	10 (50)	9 (48)	8 (47)	8 (47)	8 (46)	8 (47)	9 (49)	8 (47)	9 (48)
Average precipitation mm (inches)	13 (0.5)	23 (0.9)	46 (1.8)	120 (4.7)	81 (3.2)	51 (2)	69 (2.7)	66 (2.6)	48 (1.9)	64 (2.5)	86 (3.4)	38 (1.5)	700 (27.5)
Source: Weatherbase

== Economy and overview ==
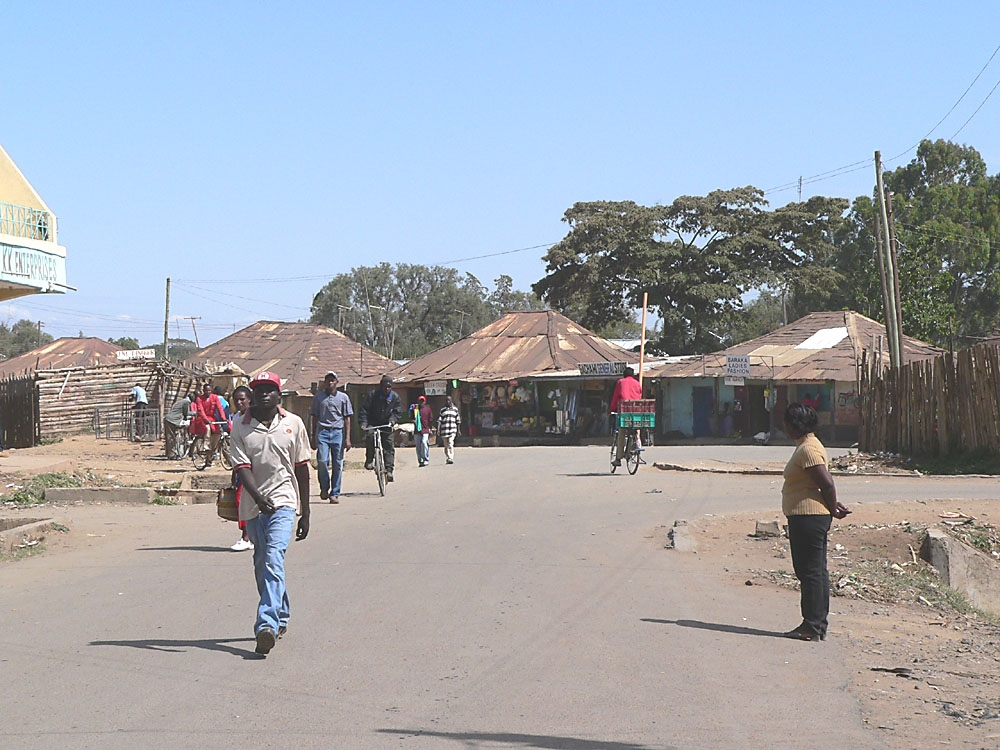
Majengo quarter

Nanyuki municipality had an urban population of 72,813 in 2019. Most members of the population earn their money through trade. Shops in the town supply many farms, ranches and game parks in a wide circle, as well as the town's residents. Originally, most shops were owned by Indians, who still form a sizable part of the population.

Climbers and backpackers visit Nanyuki on their way to or from Mount Kenya along the Sirimon and Naro Moru routes and many other tourists pass through the town. Nanyuki has many hotels, of which Mount Kenya Safari Club and Sportsman's Arms Hotel are the most prominent with others including Sport's Club, Le Rustique, Kongoni Camp, Mount Kenya Paradise Hotel and Joskaki Hotel. South of Nanyuki, the Bantu lodge offers outdoor activities, including forest walks.

There is little large-scale industry in Nanyuki. The Mount Kenya Textile (Mountex) Mills went bankrupt in 1978, was reopened briefly under new management, but eventually closed. There have been a number of sawmills in Nanyuki. However, with the almost total ban on tree felling on Mount Kenya (sometimes indifferently enforced), these either closed down or are now eking out a difficult existence.

Recently, large horticultural operations have come to the Nanyuki area, including Likii flower farm, Traco farm, Kongoni farm and several others along Nanyuki- Timau road. The revived railway transport between Nanyuki and Nairobi has increased trade in the town. Main retail centers are Cieni, Cedar Mall and Quick Mart.

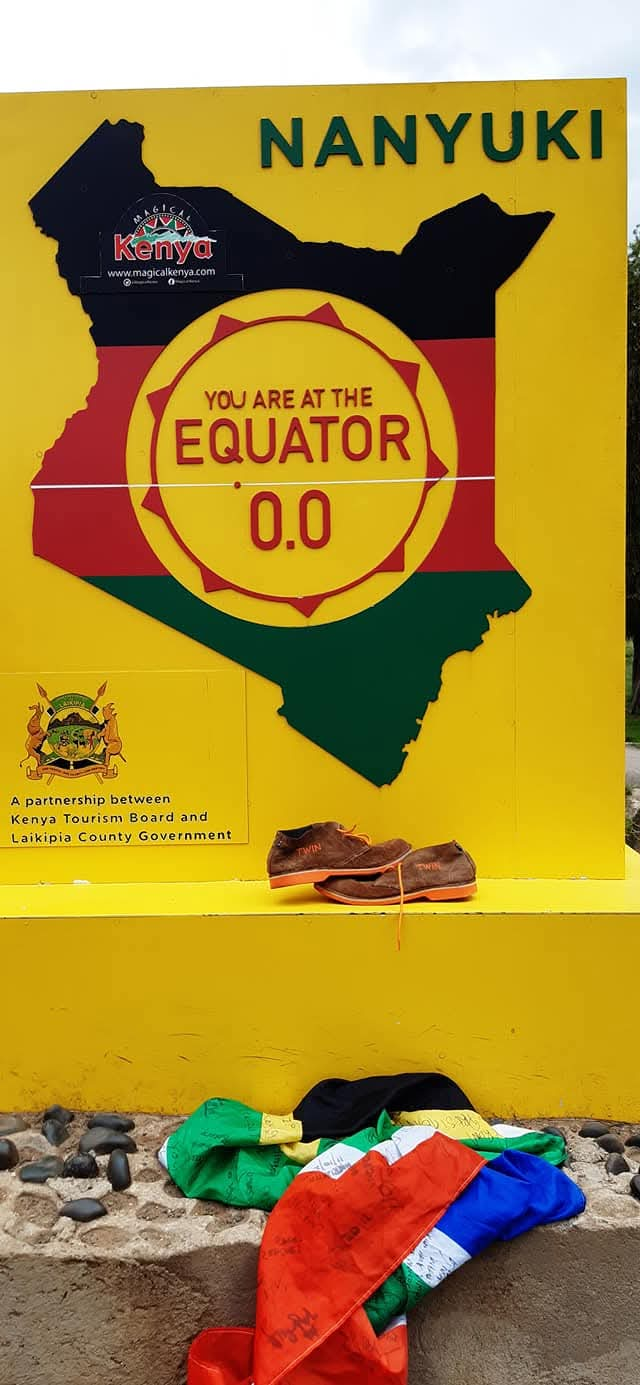
Equator sign at Nanyuki

A city park lies in the centre of the town and two rivers, the Nanyuki and LikiI Rivers, pass through it. The equator passes through the southern part of Nanyuki. One crosses it when approaching Nanyuki on the A2 from the south. This spot is popular with tourists who have themselves photographed there. Some people are usually at hand to show them the supposed effect of the Coriolis force, which they say makes draining water swirl clockwise or anticlockwise depending on whether one is on the northern or southern hemisphere, though as noted in the article about the Coriolis force, the effect is detectable only in the laboratory and the "demonstrations" at the equator are merely engaging diversions.

=== Tourism ===
The airport lies 6.5 km (4.0 mi) south of the town along the highway to Nairobi and serves light aircraft. There are regular flights operated by Air Kenya, Safarilink and Fly SAX, which is convenient for businessmen and tourists. The town is connected by a paved road from Nairobi, and northward to northern Kenya.

Tourists can visit a number of parks and reserves in the vicinity of Nanyuki, the most obvious one being Mount Kenya National Park, the Mount Kenya Wildlife Conservancy and the Fairmont Mount Kenya Safari Club which hosts large numbers of tourists seeking a luxury safari experience. The hotel has 120 luxury rooms with views of Mount Kenya alongside the Mount Kenya Wildlife Conservancy, which together with the William Holden Wildlife Foundation aims to breed and reintroduce the endangered bongo back into the area. Others are Ol Pejeta Conservancy, Sights further away include Lewa Wildlife Conservancy, Aberdare National Park, Samburu National Reserve and Shaba National Reserve.

Nanyuki has some of the cleanest water in Kenya because the source originates from Mt. Kenya. The entire water system is gravity fed, from the supply to the sewer system.

=== Education ===
Academic institutions in Nanyuki include Nanyuki High School, Moi Equator Girls' High School, St Christopher's School (formerly the Beehive School), Braeburn International School Nanyuki, Mt. Kenya Baptist Primary School, Likii Hill, Nanyuki Primary School, Mary Immaculate Primary School, Baraka School, Brickwoods School, St. Jude Nturukuma secondary, Loise Girls high school, and others.

== People ==
- Neil Aggett (1953–1982), medical doctor and activist born in Nanyuki, died in police detention in Johannesburg, South Africa
- Meja Mwangi (1948–2025), writer, born in Nanyuki

== Images ==
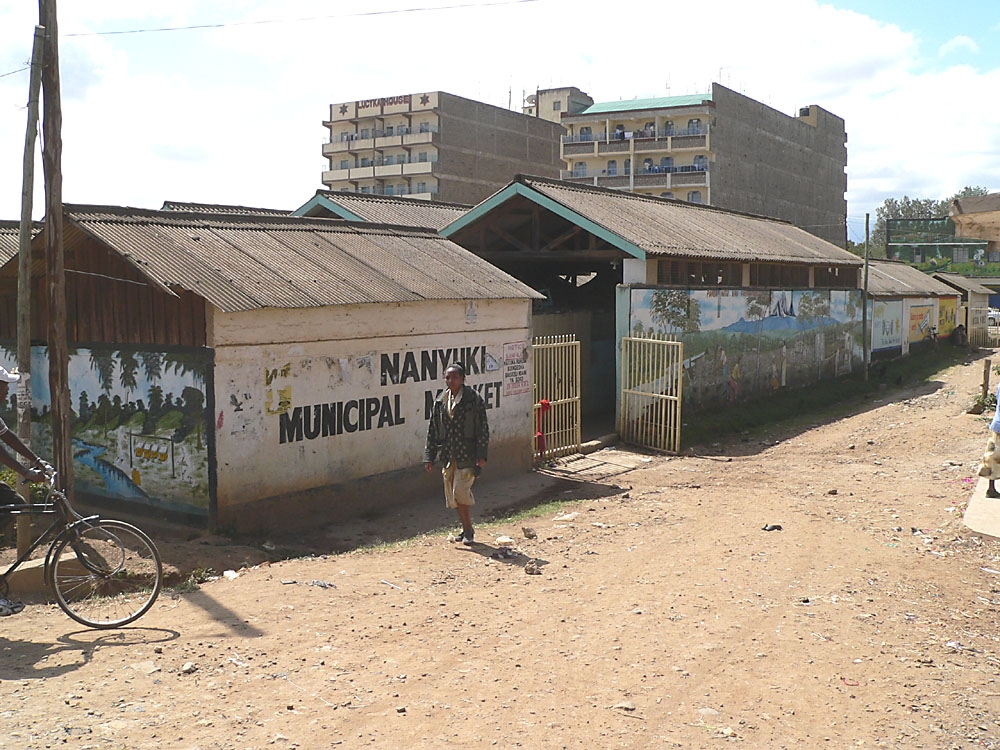
Municipal market

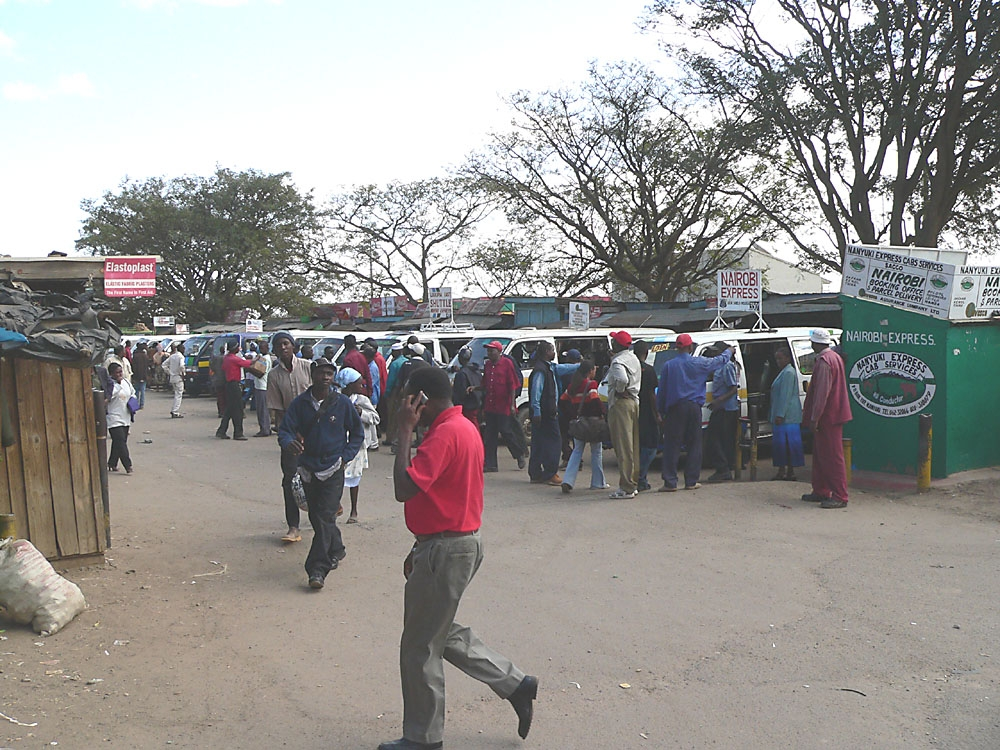
Matatu stage (bus station)

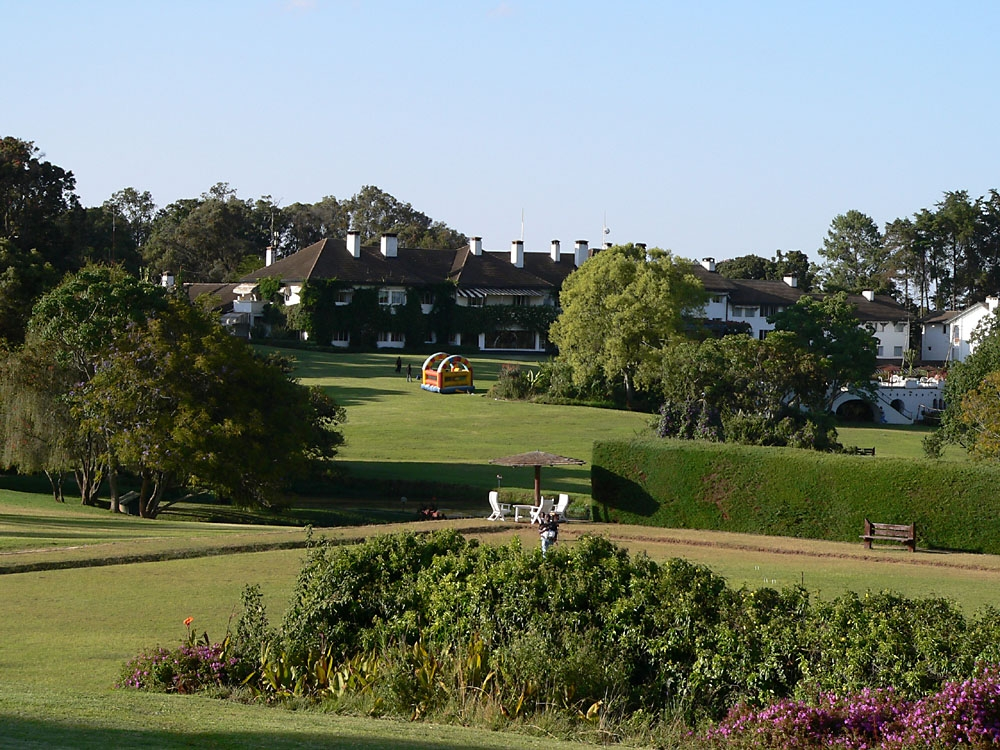
Mount Kenya Safari Club

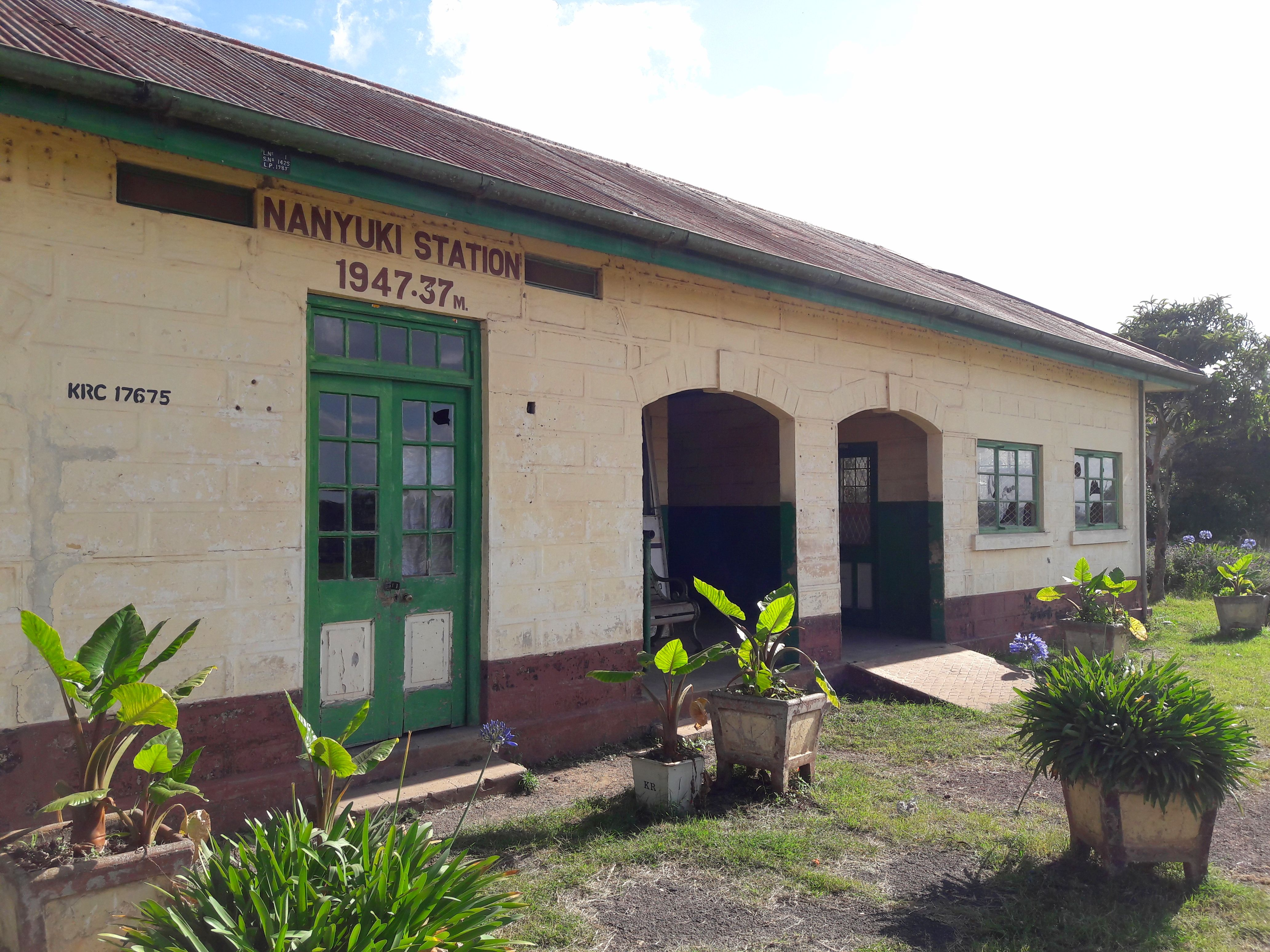
Nanyuki Train Station

== See also ==
- Nanyuki Airport
- Railway stations in Kenya
- Transport in Kenya
