= Kargi, Kenya =

Village in Kenya

Kargi
- Town
- Location within Kenya
- Coordinates: 2°30′13″N 37°34′21″E
- Country: Kenya
- County: Marsabit County
- Constituency: Laisamis Constituency
- Elevation: 427 m (1,401 ft)

Population
  - Total: ~10,000
- Time zone: UTC+3 (EAT)

Kargi is a village in Marsabit County, located in the north-eastern portion of Kenya. Its about 50 kilometres (31 mi) from Marsabit, and about 430 kilometres (270 mi) from the country's capital, Nairobi.

== Infrastructure ==
The town has a mosque, a Catholic church, three primary schools, an all-boys secondary school, and a dispensary. The town also has a water pan to the north. Manyattas, or a group of huts forming a unit within a fence, characterise the towns fringes.

== Demographics ==
Kargi is estimated to be made up of 2,064 households, and 26% of its residents can read and write.

== Geography ==
Kargi is located on the Korolle Oasis inside the Chalbi Desert. The oasis and town are a stop for the animals of the Rendille, Gabra and Borana to drink.

=== Climate ===
Kargi has a Tropical savanna climate. The district's yearly temperature is 26.6 °C (79.9 °F), 4.1% higher than Kenya's average. Kargi typically receives about 130.92 millimetres (5.154 in) of precipitation and has 120.09 rainy days, or 32.9% of the time. This area has high heat, compared to the chilly Marsabit weather. Pastoralists who used to stay along the slopes of Marsabit drive down to Kargi for the sunshine.

== History ==
Kargi has a rich cultural history of one of the most gentle tribes in Kenya. The discovery and settlement of people, the Rendille, who are pastoralist in nature, began quite earlier than 1850. Some descriptive landmarks are the dark mountains, Haldayan (meaning Marsabit) and the vast salty desert lake Turkana in the west of the Marsabit/Mt Kulal biosphere. Kargi has a history of more than ten agesets. Many Rendille leaders came from Kargi. Among the first teachers, Mr. George I. Orre, Francis S. Orgule, The UNESCO researcher Dr. Phil, (American), The first colonial Governor of Marsabit, First Bishop Cavallera, among the first Italian missionaries who arrived in 1950’s and the first primary school spread knowledge amongst the Rendille people. H.E. Titus Ngoyoni, the late MP for Laismis constituency, are among the few others. The recent Senator Abubakar Harugura, Joseph Lekuton, Robert Kochale, and Chief Ogom. Kargi holds a memorable history of many massacres between the Gabra and Rendille people. This includes the brutal killings of Bargeri at Bagasi in 1968, the inter-clan conflicts, the raids, ancient female gender ageset lifestyle mapping, nomadic inputs and cultural events.

In 2017, the Kenya Off-Grid Solar Access Project (KOSAP) was launched, which planned to provide energy to 277,000 households (1.3 million people) in remote, low density, and underserved areas of Kenya. It aimed to provide energy to towns like Kargi via mini-grids .

In 2020, residents from Kargi sued the state of Kenya over claims of poisonous materials being dumped in the area by international corporations. One of the companies mentioned was Amoco Petroleum, which explored for oil in the 1980s, and after no success, abandoned the project without properly cleaning. It is reported that the dumping of these materials has caused the deaths of 7,000 animals after contaminating water supplies.

In 2021, World Desertification and Drought Day was held on 17 June, where some 10,000 trees were planted.

Between 2020 and 2023, a drought occurred affecting the region heavily, and causing the deaths of many livestock in the town.

On the 1st of March at 2AM, bandits attacked the town of Kargi, stealing about a 1000 sheep and goats and killing 3, two of which were children aged 7 and 8, and the other was a 35 year old herdsman
