= Lerata =

Village in northern Kenya

- Location of Lerata in Kenya
- Coordinates: 0°48′0″N 37°31′0″E
- Country: Kenya
- County: Samburu County

Lerata is a village in northern Kenya, situated between Marsabit and Shaba, Kenya. It is in an area populated by the Samburu people. Lerata is located along the A2 road, not far north of Archers Post. The C79 road towards Maralal and Baragoi has its eastern end in Lerata. Lerata is part of the Waso East ward in Samburu East Constituency and Samburu County Council of Samburu County.
