= Kabale Tache Arero =

Kenyan businesswoman and corporate executive

- Born: Kabale Tache Arero c. 1977 (age 48–49); Mata Arba, Saku Constituency; Marsabit County, Kenya
- Education: Kenyatta University (Bachelor of Business Administration) (Master of Business Administration)
- Occupations: Businesswoman & Corporate Executive
- Years active: 2000s - present
- Title: Chief Executive Officer; Kenya National Land Commission

Kabale Tache Arero, is a businesswoman and corporate executive in Kenya. She is the chief executive officer of Kenya National Land Commission, a parastatal entity whose mandate includes management of public land on behalf of the national and county governments. It also monitors and has oversight over land-use planning throughout the country. She was confirmed as substantive CEO in June 2023, having served as Acting CEO since December 2018.

== Background and education ==
She is a Kenyan national. She was born in the community of Mata Arba, in Saku Constituency, in Marsabit County, circa 1970s. She is the middle child and only female in a family of seven siblings. She matriculated from Moi Girls High School.

Her first degree is a Bachelor of Business Administration. Her second degree is a Master of Business Administration, with bias in Human Resource Management, obtained from Kenyatta University, in Nairobi, Kenya. She is a full Member of the Institute of Human Resource Management (IHRM) and is a Certified Human Resources Professional.

== Career ==
Her career stretches back for over 20 years, as of June 2023. Past employers include the Constitution Implementation Commission (CIC) and Postbank Kenya. Prior to her appointment as Ag. CEO of Kenya NLC in 2018, she was the head of human resources at the National Land Commission.

== Personal ==
She is married to Shadrack Jirma, a business consultant and academic. Together, they are parents to four sons.

== Other considerations ==
In December 2023, William Ruto, the president and head of state of Kenya bestowed upon her the award of Moran of the Order of the Burning Spear (MBS), in recognition and appreciation of her services to the Republic of Kenya. She was also awarded as the Public Sector CEO of the Year 2023, by Africa Public Sector Conference and Awards (APSCA).

== See also ==
- Fatuma Abdulkadir Adan
