= Marsabit National Park =

National park & nature reserve in northern Kenya

Marsabit National Reserve
- Location within Kenya
- Location: Eastern Province, Kenya
- Nearest city: Marsabit
- Coordinates: 2°22′59″N 37°58′59″E
- Area: 1,554 km^{2} (600 sq mi)
- Established: 1949
- Governing body: Kenya Wildlife Service

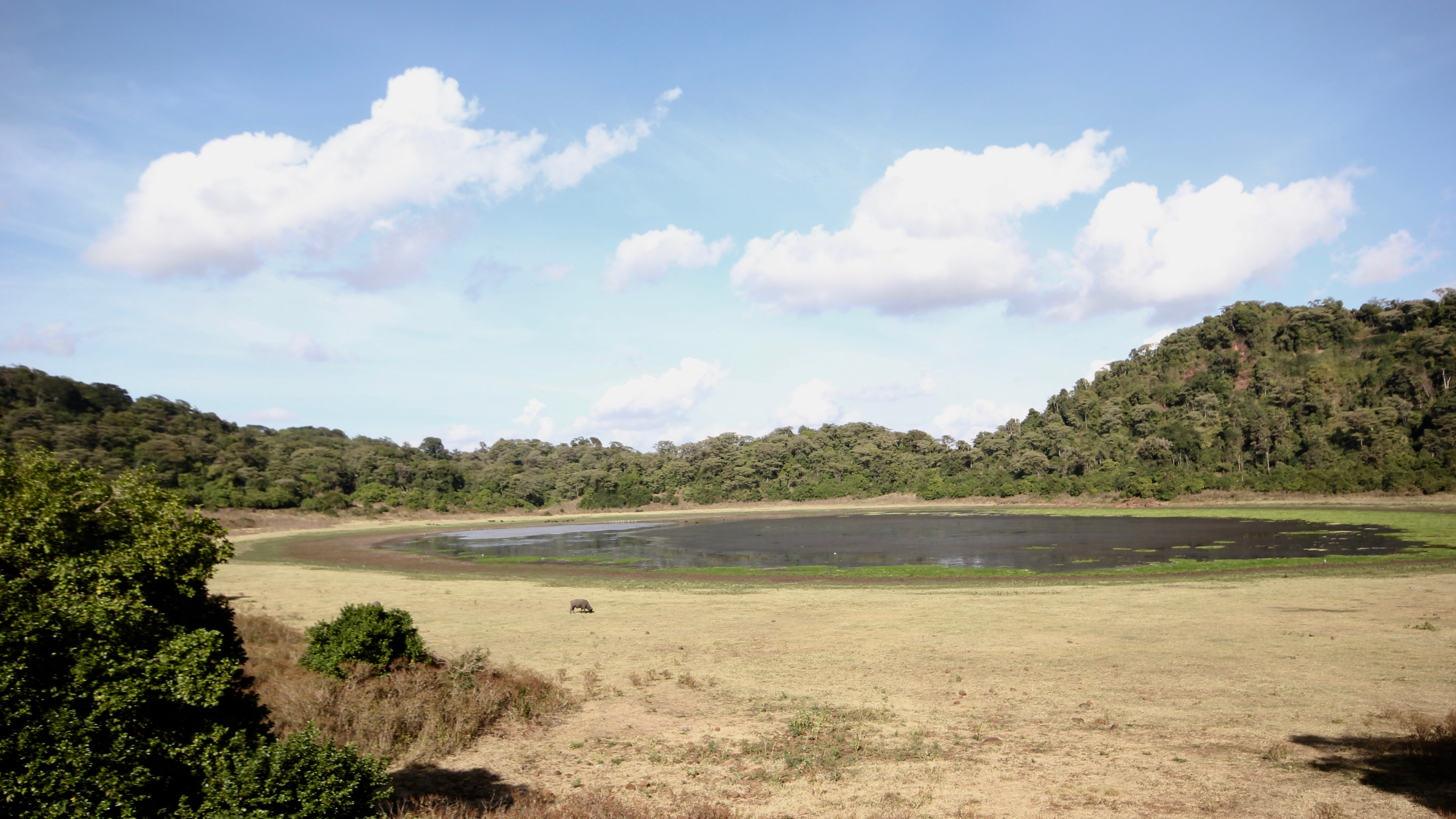
Lake Paradise

The Marsabit National Park is a national park and nature reserve located at Mount Marsabit in northern Kenya, near the town of Marsabit. It is located 560 km (350 mi) north of Nairobi in Marsabit County in the former Eastern Province and its reserve is noted for its zebra population and bird sanctuary.

== Geography ==
The area contains a number of extinct volcanic craters, which are covered in forests. There is a crater in the vicinity named Gof Redo, roughly 5 kilometres (3.1 mi) north of Marsabit in the fork of the roads to Moyale and North Horr.

== Flora and fauna ==
Zebras, elephant, lions, giraffes, buffaloes, black and white colobus, blue monkeys, bushbucks, sunis, and leopards populate the park. The park contains some 350 species of birds in total, of which 52 are birds of prey. The cliffs in the northern end of Lake Paradise, in Gof Sokorte Gurda, are home to a number of birds, including Ruppell's griffon vultures, peregrine falcons, mountain buzzards, black kites and African fish eagles. Ducks such as garganeys, southern pochards and teals are found on the lake, which is also home to red-knobbed coots, hamerkops, ibises, purple herons, and yellow-billed storks. On the lower slopes of the forest of the park, marked by scrubland, there are populations of olive baboons, vervet monkeys, Peter's gazelles, beisa oryxes, striped hyenas, caracals and aardwolves.

On the road south from Mount Marsabit to the rocky plains of Shaba, Michael Palin describes passing extraordinary Strangler figs in the mountain-top forest, a stark contrast to the dusty track below which is lined by low, flat-topped acacias. The area is home to sociable weaver birds, which can be identified by their neater, tidier nests; sparrow weavers, with their "scruffier" nests; and white-bellied turacos.

In the 1970s, the park achieved fame for reputedly having elephants with the longest tusks in the world. One elephant, named Ahmed, was under constant surveillance, and when he died his tusks were found to weigh over 300 kg.
