= Chalbi Desert =

Desert in northern Kenya

Coordinates: 03°01′54″N 37°20′51″E

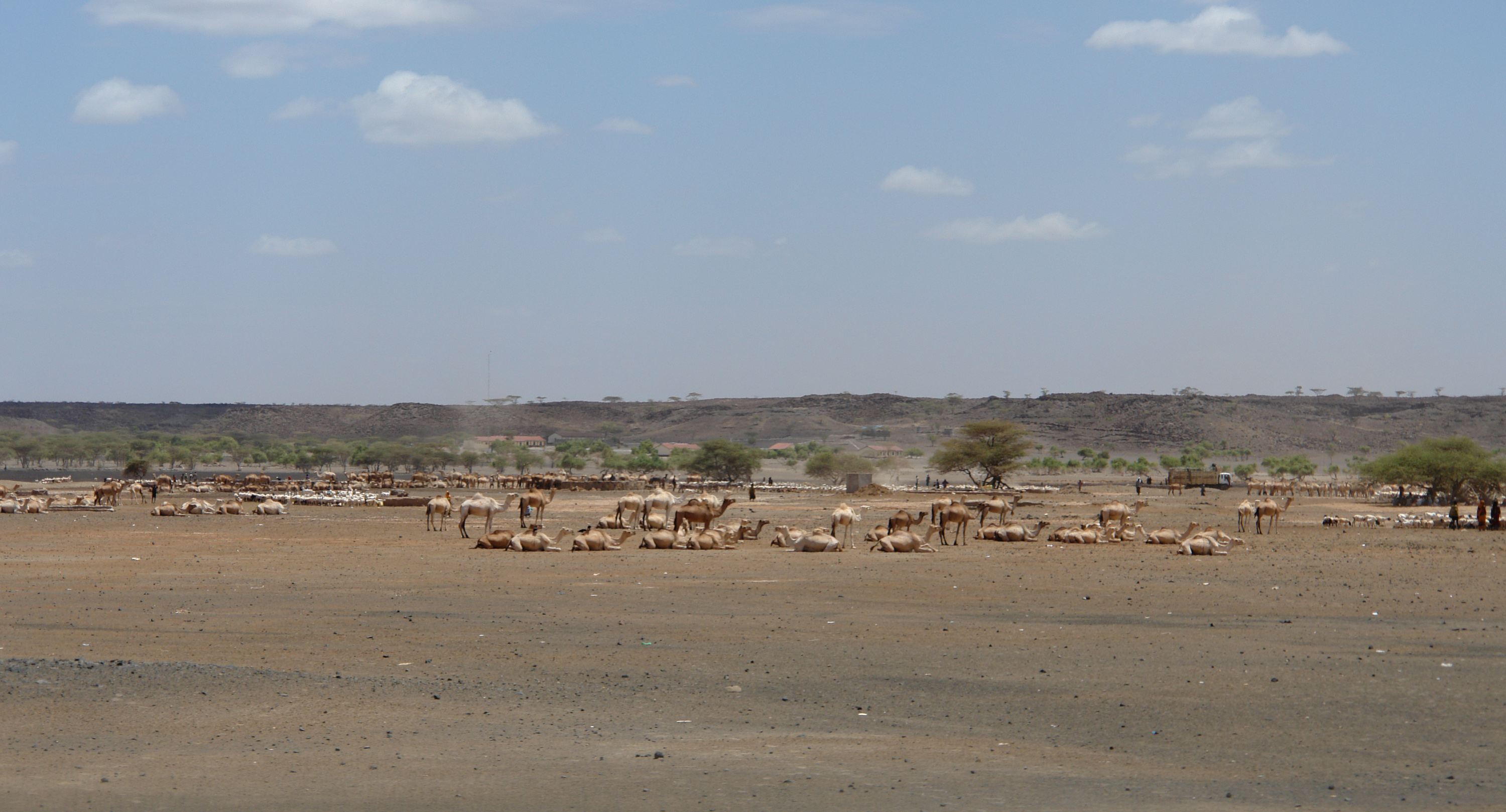
- Chalbi Desert

Geography
- Country: Kenya
- Interactive map of Chalbi Desert

The Chalbi Desert is a small desert in northern Kenya near the border with Ethiopia. It is east of Lake Turkana, within the Marsabit County. Marsabit is the closest major urban center.

== Etymology ==
In the language of the Gabra people, Chalbi means "bare, salty area".

== Location and description ==
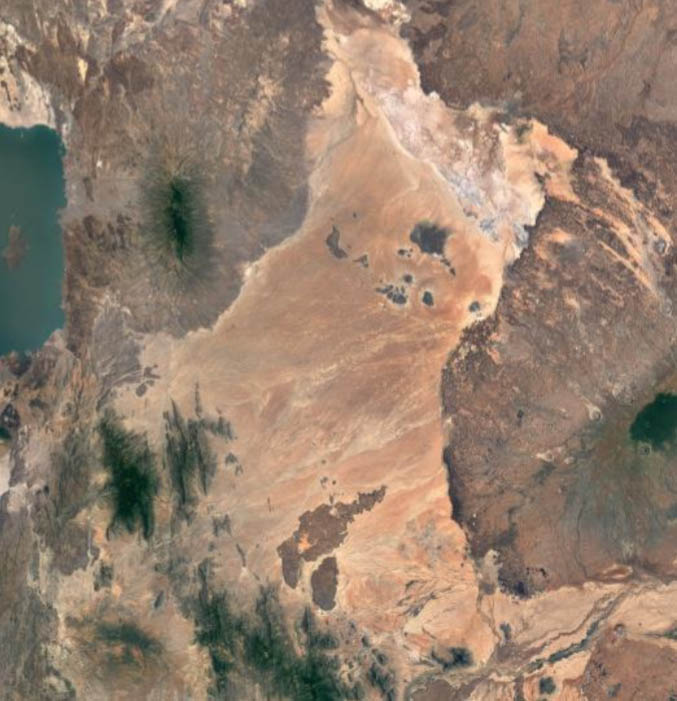
Chalbi Desert Satellite

The Chalbi Desert is located in between Mount Marsabit and Lake Turkana. The area is 110 km long and 10 to 20 km wide and it extends over 100,000 km^{2}.

The area is composed of an ancient lake-bed, rocky surface and lava regions. The ancient lake-bed of Chalbi used to be a shallow lake around 10,000 to 11,000 years ago. The lava hills provide some altitudinal change in an otherwise plain region. The ground is a combination of dried mud and salt. When it rains, the ground becomes a soft, sticky surface.

Chalbi desert has been recognized as an important geosite of Kenya. The preserved fossils of the area have been critical to the understanding of the Quaternary climate in East Africa. These fossils include aquatic animals like the Nile perch. It is also a site of the mineral eugsterite.

=== Climate ===
Chalbi is a rain-shadow desert. Mean annual rainfall is approximately 150 millimetres or 6 inches (or up to 350 millimetres or 14 inches). Rainfall is erratic and in some years the area barely receives any rainfall at all. In 1973, for example, only 7 millimetres or 0.3 inches of rainfall were recorded. Meanwhile, the potential evaporation likely is over 2,600 millimetres or 100 inches. At the edge of the desert, there are numerous springs, which create oases of water and grasses.

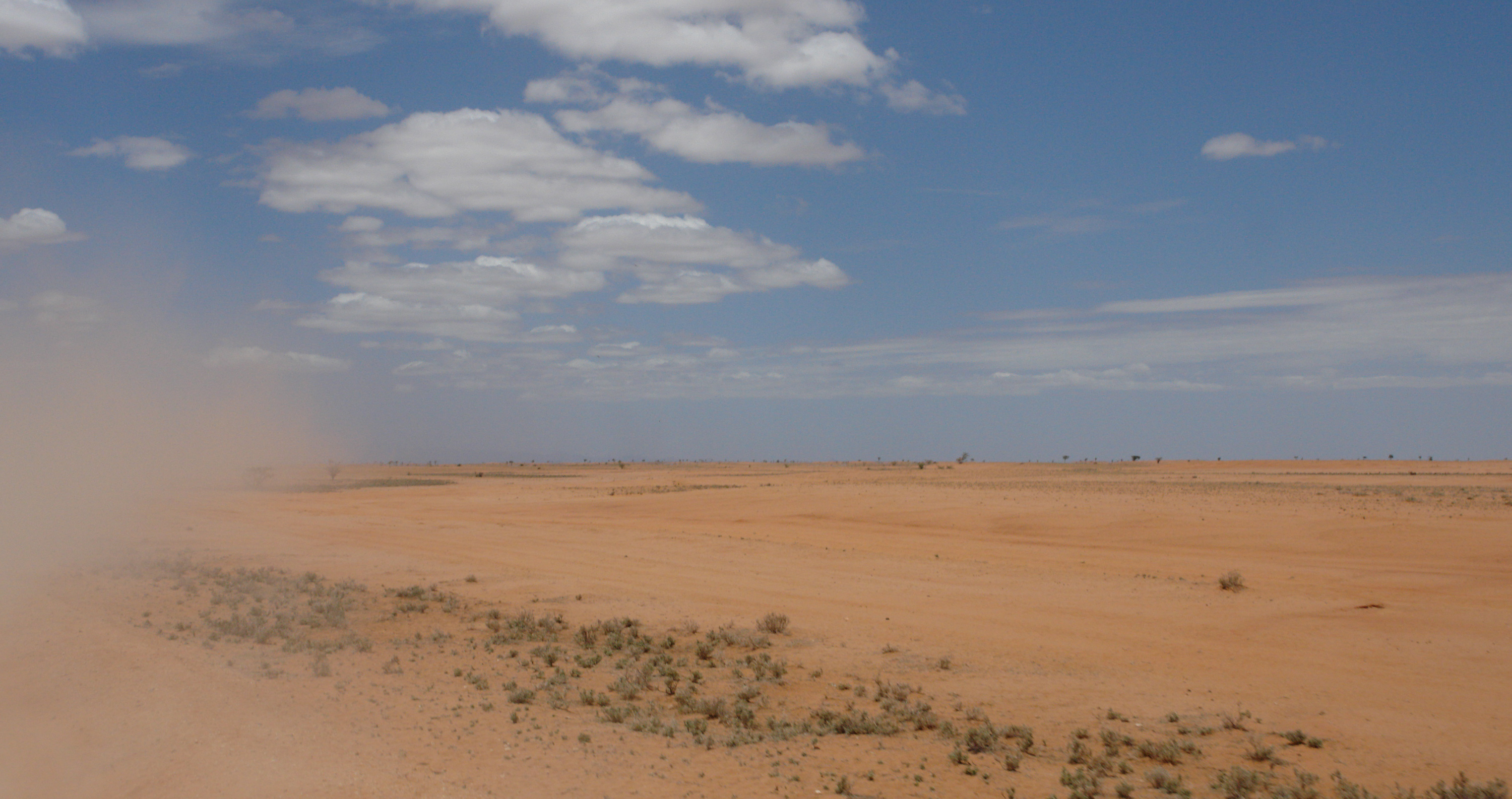
Chalbi Desert DSC08742

Occasionally, rain falls as a heavy downpour, and the water runs off through the hard desert surface and pools at surface depressions. In years of exceptional rainfall, a temporary lake is formed that can last several months. This happened during 1978, for example, when a temporary lake of 50 centimetres or 1 foot 8 inches in depth was formed long enough for waterfowl to make use of it.

The Chalbi desert sustains high winds. In fact, the area has some of the strongest and most sustained wind systems of the world. The area sustains for over 50 days per years wind speeds of over 50 kilometres per hour (14 m/s; 31 mph; 27 kn). Sandstorms are a common feature of the region.

=== Fauna ===
The following herbivores can be found in the region: oryx, African elephant, Somali ostrich, Grevy's zebra, and reticulated giraffe. In the past, black rhinoceros used to live in the area, but they were hunted to extinction. As for the large predator guild, African lions live in the region.

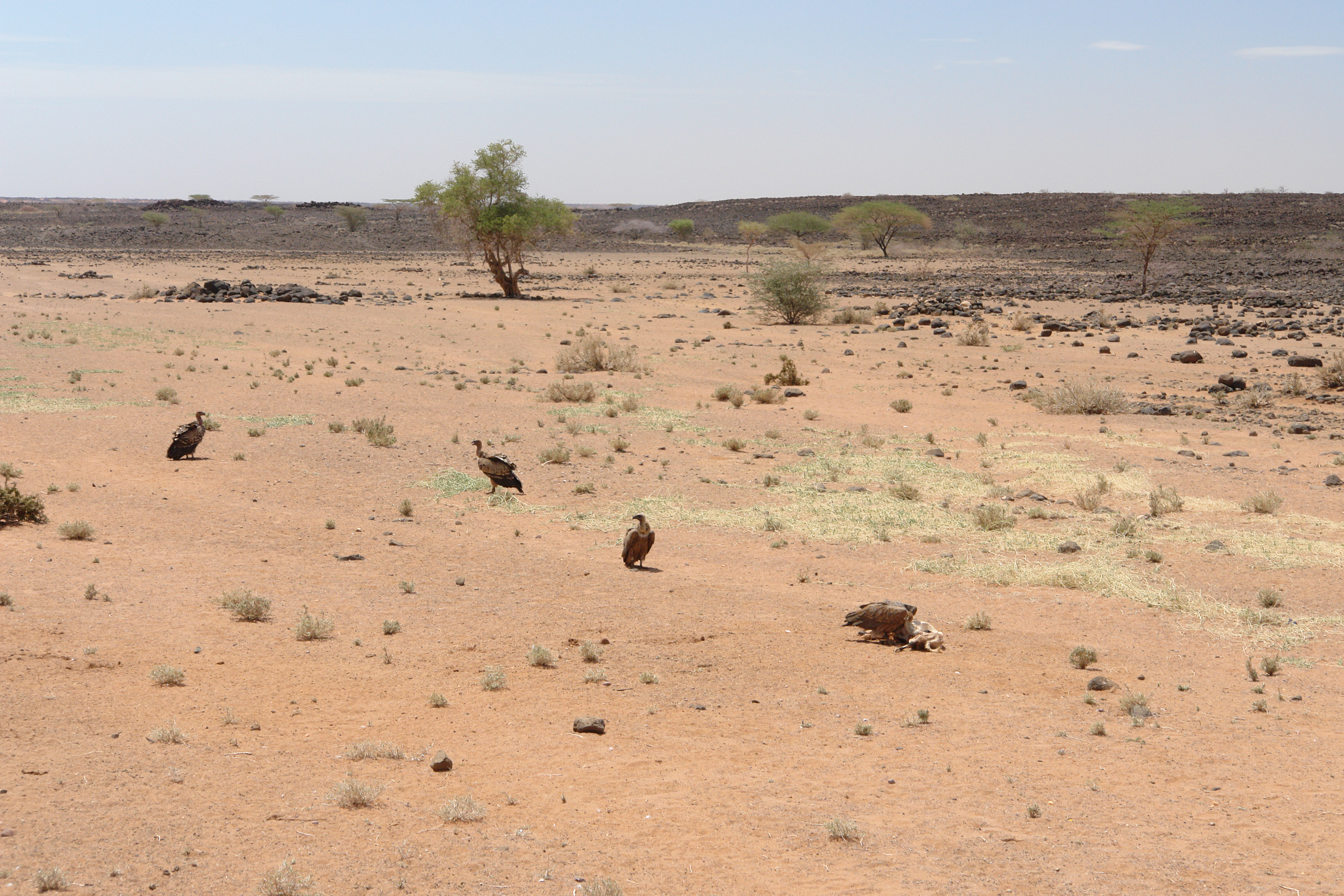
Chalbi Desert DSC08729

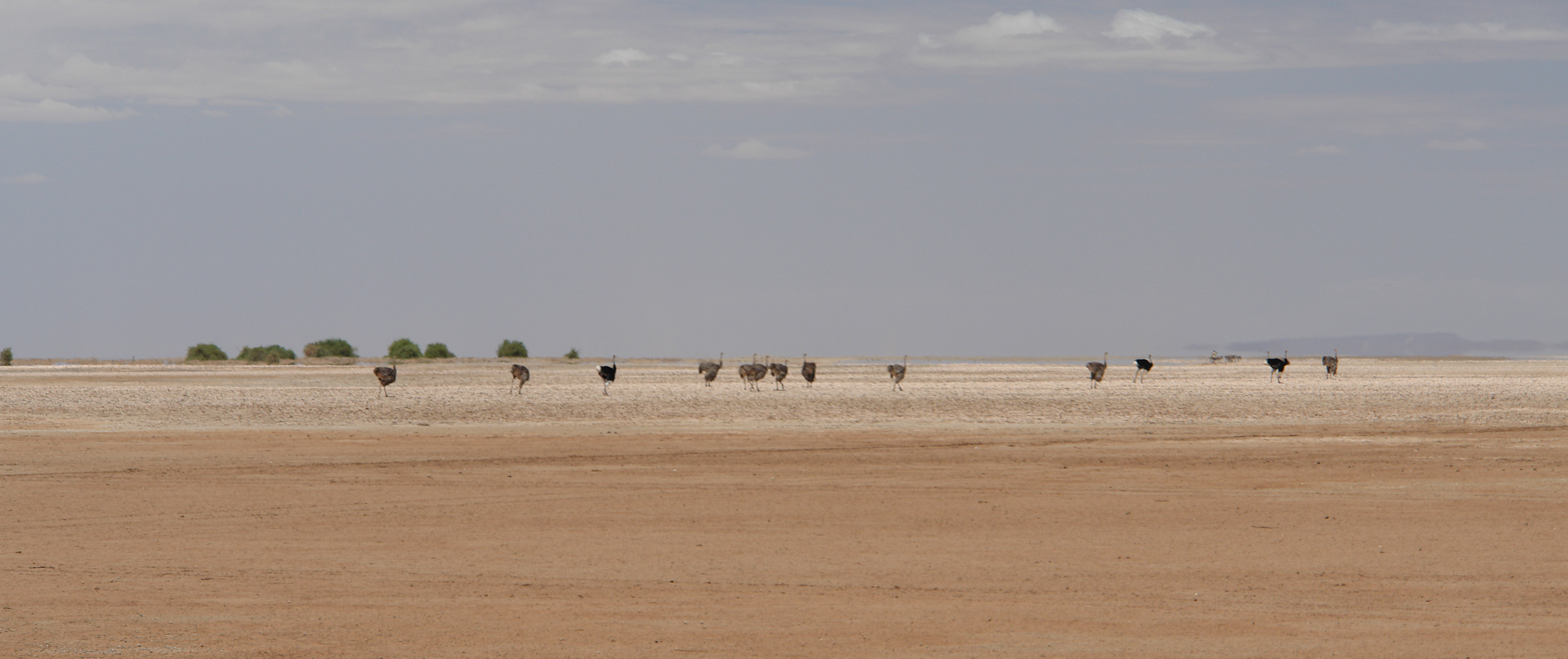
Chalbi Desert DSC08764

=== Flora ===
The high salinity makes the area home to only a few plant species. Most of the Chalbi Desert is barren and has no vegetation. One of those areas where plants do grow is usually near outlets of tributary streams after the seasonal rainfalls. Salvadora persica, Acacia tortilis, and Cordia sinensis can grow in the areas around Chalbi's drainage system, but most plants that grow in the desert are annual plants. One of those plants is Drakebrockmania somalensis. During years of high rainfall, these areas can be seen covered by grasses like Aristida adscensionis and A. mutabilis. Another region where some plants grow is in the former lake bed. There, one can find Lagenantha nogalensis. Finally, one can also find plants on the edges of the desert, such as Dasysphaera prostrata or Hyphaene coriacea.

== Human habitation ==
The Gabbra pastoralists live around this area of Kenya. These nomadic people herd goats and cattle, and camels to some extent. A few other pastoralists are also present in the region, such as the Rendille, the Dasanech, or the Turkana.

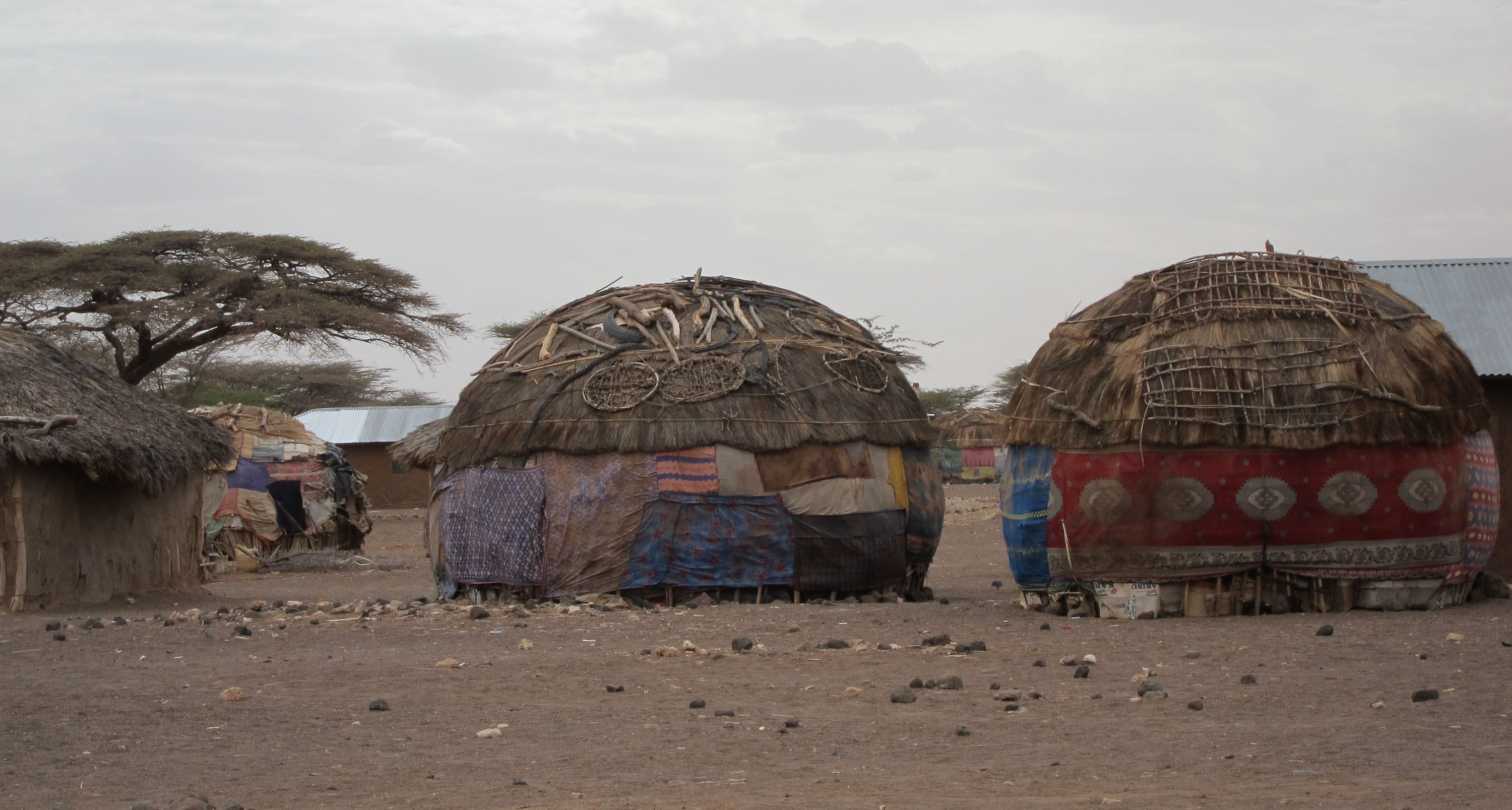
Chalbi Desert IMG 0700

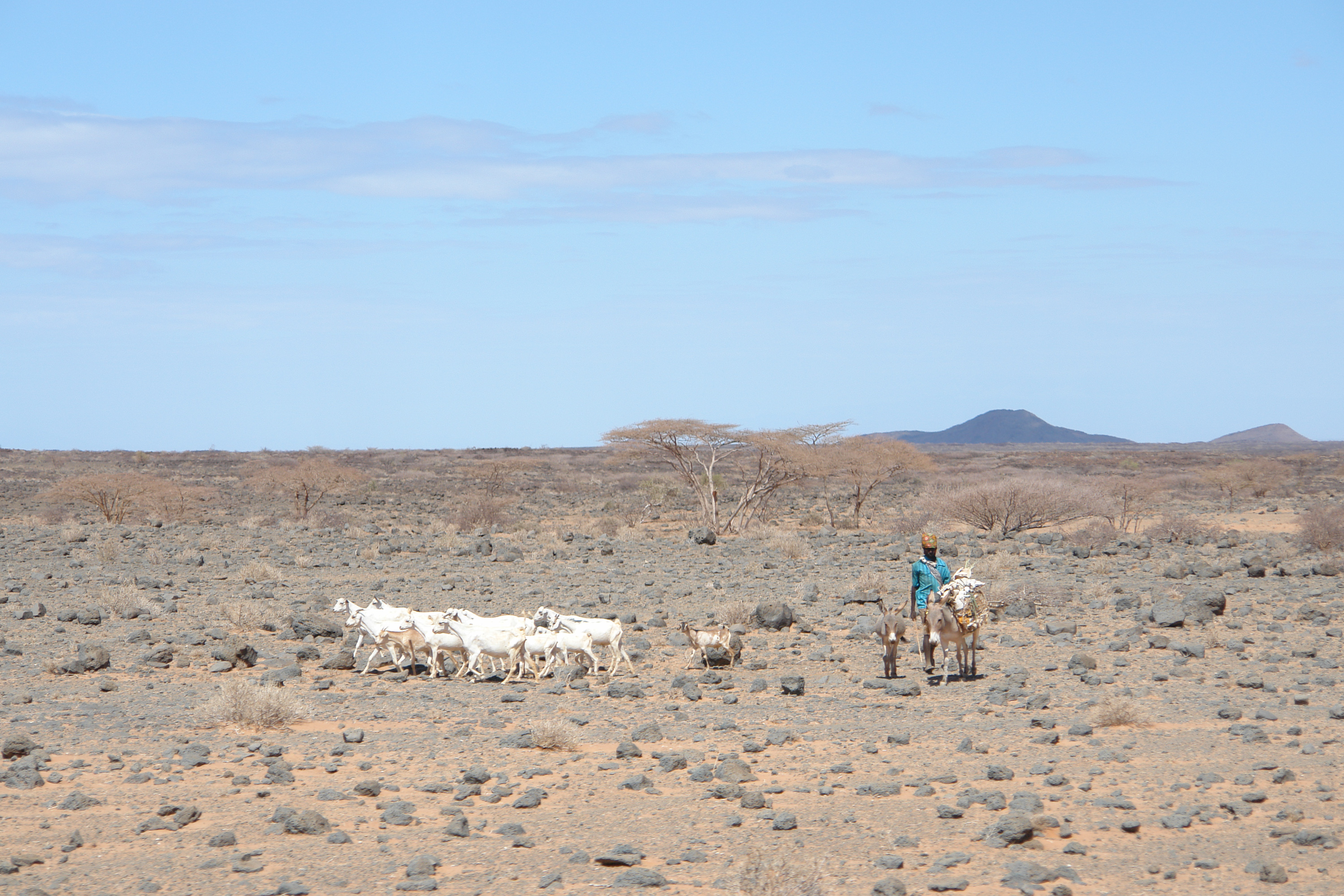
Chalbi Desert DSC08718

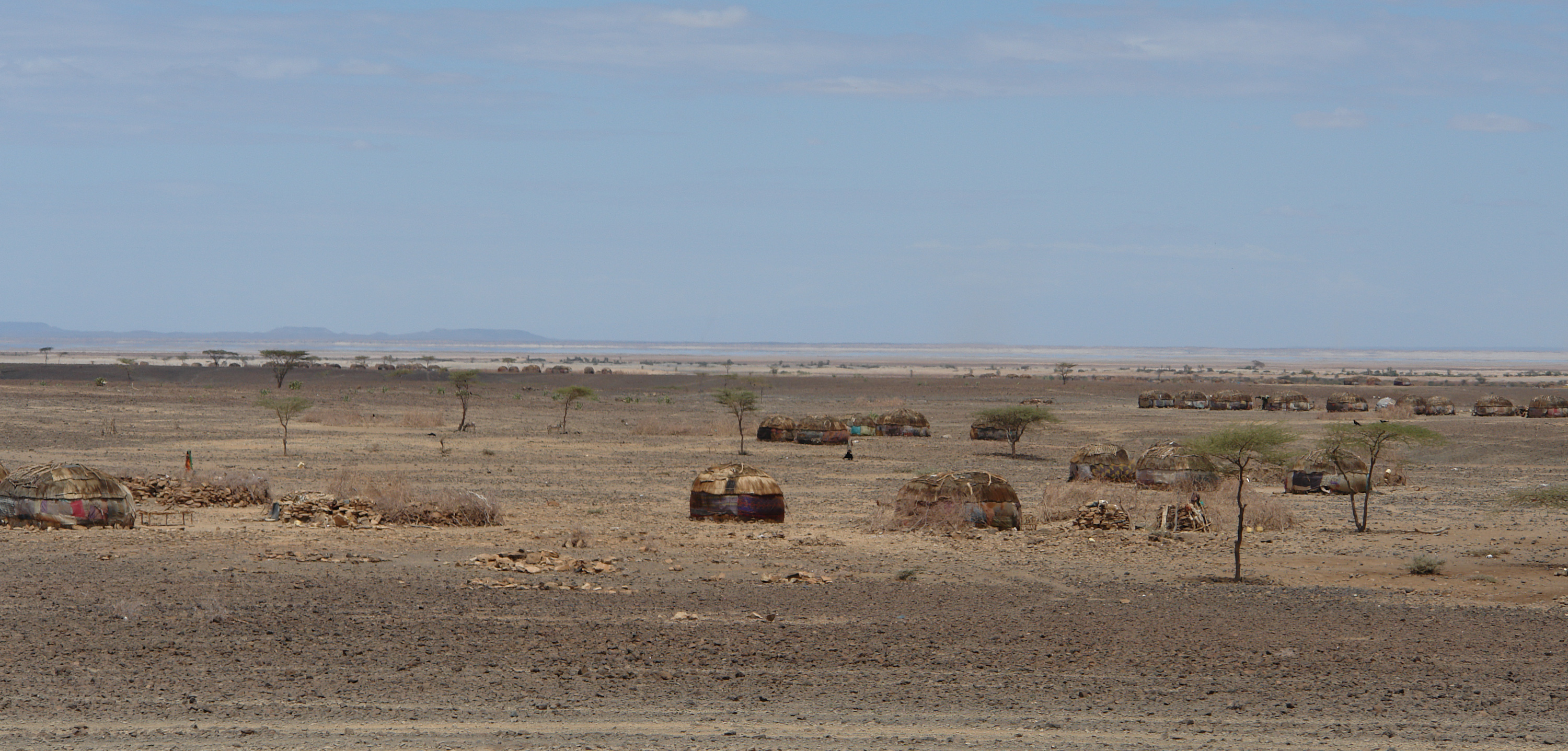
Chalbi Desert DSC08745

=== Technology ===
The largest wind farm in Africa is located in the west edge of the desert. Unfortunately, no benefits from the wind farm have reached the local communities.

== Tourism ==
The area has seen a rise in desert tourism since the beginning of the 2020s, and is increasingly seen as one of Kenya's new and upcoming tourist destinations.
