= A2 road (Kenya) =

A2 Road

Route information
- Part of Cairo–Cape Town Highway (TAH 4)
- Maintained by Kenya National Highways Authority

Major junctions
- North end: Moyale
- South end: Nairobi

Location
- Country: Kenya

Highway system
- Transport in Kenya

Road route

The A2 road is the Kenyan section of the Cairo-Cape Town Trans-African Highway 4.

The 938 km road extends from Namanga border point with Tanzania in the south Nairobi to the Moyale border with Ethiopia in the north.

The northern section of the road, from Isiolo to Moyale, was completely paved in 2016.

== Namanga-Nairobi section ==
The southern section connecting Nairobi with Namanga was previously designated as the A104 road, From Nairobi, the route follows the Nairobi–Mombasa road to Athi River. The 136 km Athi River–Namanga section passes through Kitengela, Isinya, Kajiado and Ilbisil before reaching Namanga.

The Athi River–Namanga section was underwent a major upgrade in 2012, with a seven-metre-wide single carriageway and two-metre shoulders. Congestion remains a major challenge around Kitengela.

=== Expansion plans ===
In September 2026, the Government of Kenya approved a project concept for upgrading the 136 km Athi River–Namanga section to a dual carriageway through a public–private partnership.

== Nairobi–Isiolo section ==
The Nairobi–Isiolo section runs through Thika, Sagana, Karatina and Nanyuki. Its southern stretch forms the Thika Superhighway, that completed a major expansion in November 2012.

Expansion of the 84 km Kenol–Sagana–Marua section to a four-lane dual carriageway began in 2020 and was reported as being near completion in November 2026.

The Kenya National Highways Authority announced plans in 2026 to extend the 147 km section from Marua through Nanyuki to the Isiolo junction to dual carriageway standard.

== Isiolo-Moyale section ==
The Isiolo–Moyale Road forms the northern section of the A2, running through Archers Post, Marsabit and Turbi to the Ethiopian border at Moyale. It also forms part of the LAPSSET corridor. The upgrade to bitumen standard was completed in July 2017, financed by the African Development Bank and the Export–Import Bank of China.

== Towns ==
The following towns, listed from north to south, are located along the highway.

- Moyale
- Marsabit
- Isiolo
- Nanyuki
- Thika
- Nairobi
- Athi River
- Namanga
