= Isiolo–Moyale Road =

Kenyan road

Coordinates: 02°28′14″N 38°03′59″E

Route information
- Part of Cairo–Cape Town Highway (TAH 4)
- Length: 313 mi (504 km)
- History: Designated in 2008; Completion in 2017

Major junctions
- South end: Isiolo
- Archers Post; Marsabit
- North end: Moyale

Location
- Country: Kenya

Highway system
- Transport in Kenya

Map of Major Roads in Kenya

The Isiolo–Moyale Road is a road section of the A2 Road in Kenya, connecting the towns of Isiolo, Archers Post, Marsabit, and Moyale. The road is a component of the Lamu Port and Lamu-Southern Sudan-Ethiopia Transport Corridor (LAPSSET) Project. It connects Kenya to Ethiopia, its neighbor to the north.

It is part of the Cairo-Cape Town Trans-African Highway 4.

== Location ==
The road starts at Isiolo, Isiolo County, approximately 273 kilometres (170 mi), north of Nairobi, the capital and largest city of Kenya. From there, the road travels in a general northerly direction through Archers Post, Merille, Marsabit, Turbi, to end at Moyale, at the international border with Ethiopia. The total distance traveled is approximately 504 kilometres (313 mi),

== Overview ==
This road is an important trade corridor between Kenya and Ethiopia. It links four Kenyan counties and for the residents of these communities, it is a vital trade and transportation link to Nairobi and Mombasa, the two largest cities in the country.

The road is also a component of the Great North Trans African Highway, sometimes referred to as the Great North Road, that stretches from Cape Town, South Africa to Cairo, Egypt. This road has been identified as a priority project in the New Partnership for Africa's Development (NEPAD) short-term action plan.

== Upgrade and funding ==
Prior to the upgrade to tarmac, the section from Merille, through Marsabit, Turbi, up to Moyale, measuring approximately 363 kilometres (226 mi), was gravel surfaced.

Using money borrowed from the African Development Bank and from the Exim Bank of China, the upgrade was divided into three equidistant phases, each measuring 121 kilometres (75 mi).

China Wu Yi, was the main contractor at a contract price of KSh42 billion (US$420 million). The financing for his road project, is as illustrated in the table below.

Sources of Funds for Rehabilitation of Isiolo–Moyale Road
Rank	Name of Development Partner	Amount in US Dollars	Percentage	Notes
1	African Development Bank			Loan
2	Government of Kenya			Equity
3	Exim Bank of China			Loan
	Total	420.00 million	100.00	

^{*Note: Totals may be slightly off due to rounding.}

== See also ==
- List of roads in Kenya
- East African Community
