= Moyale Constituency =

Electoral constituency in Kenya

Moyale
- constituency for the Parliament of Kenya
- Moyale Constituency within Marsabit County

- Marsabit County within Kenya
- County: Marsabit
- Population: 108,949
- Area: 3,327 km^{2} (1,284.6 sq mi)

Current constituency
- Number of members: 1
- Party: UPIA
- Member of Parliament: Guyo Waqo Jaldesa
- Wards: 7

Moyale Constituency is an electoral constituency in Kenya. It is one of four constituencies in Marsabit County, and it was the only constituency in the former Moyale District. The constituency has nine wards, all electing MCAs to the Marsabit County Assembly. The constituency was established for the 1966 elections.

== Members of Parliament ==
Elections	MP		
1979	Guyo Halake Liban	KANU	One-party system
1983	Mohamed Malicha Galgallo	KANU	One-party system.
1988	Philip Galma Galgallo	KANU	One-party system.
1992	Mohamed Malicha Galgallo	KANU	
1997	Guracha Boru Galgallo	KANU	
2002	Guracha Boru Galgallo	KANU	Galgallo died in an aviation accident in 2006
2006	Malla Wario Galgallo	KANU	By-election
2007	Ali Mohamud Mohamed	ODM	
2013	Roba Duba	TNA	

== Wards ==
Wards
Ward	Registered Voters
Bori	1,556
Butiye	7,022
Dabel	913
Damballa Fachana	1,360
Godoma	922
Golole	2,086
Heillu	3,770
Manyatta	4,223
Moyale	7,122
Nana	1,310
Odda	2,460
Sololo	8,612
Sololo Makutano	1,780
Uran	3,128
Walda/ Rawana	1,550
Total	60,117
*September 2005.
