= A4 road (Kenya) =

Road in Kenya

A4 Road
- A4 highlighted in red

Route information
- Maintained by KeNHA

Major junctions
- North end: Illeret
- South end: Gilgil

Location
- Country: Kenya

Highway system
- Transport in Kenya

The A4 road is a long road in Kenya extending from Gilgil in Nakuru County to the Ethiopian border on the East side of Lake Turkana in Marsabit County.

The section Rumuruti-Maralal-Baragoi is considered to be the gateway to Samburu County and, as of 2019, it was being paved from Rumuruti up to Maralal.

== Towns ==
The following towns, listed from west to east, are located along the highway:

- Gilgil
- Nyahururu
- Rumuruti
- Maralal
- Baragoi
- South Horr
- Loyangalani
- North Horr
- Illeret (the last town before the Ethiopian border)
