= Hemidactylus funaiolii =

Conservation status
- Data Deficient (IUCN 3.1)

Scientific classification
- Kingdom: Animalia
- Phylum: Chordata
- Class: Reptilia
- Order: Squamata
- Suborder: Gekkota
- Family: Gekkonidae
- Genus: Hemidactylus
- Species: H. funaiolii

Binomial name
- Hemidactylus funaiolii Lanza, 1978

Species of lizard

Hemidactylus funaiolii, also known commonly as the Archer's Post gecko and the Kenya leaf-toed gecko, is a species of lizard in the family Gekkonidae. The species is native to East Africa.

== Etymology ==
The specific name, funaiolii, is in honor of Italian zoologist Ugo Funaioli.

== Geographic range ==
H. funaiolii is found from Somalia to central Kenya.

== Habitat ==
The preferred natural habitats of H. funaiolii are savanna, shrubland, and rocky areas, at altitudes of 300–600 m (980–1,970 ft).

== Description ==
H. funaiolii is a small species for its genus. The dorsal surface of the body is covered with uniform keeled scales which are strongly imbricate.

== Reproduction ==
H. funaiolii is oviparous.
