= Merille, Kenya =

Merille
- Village
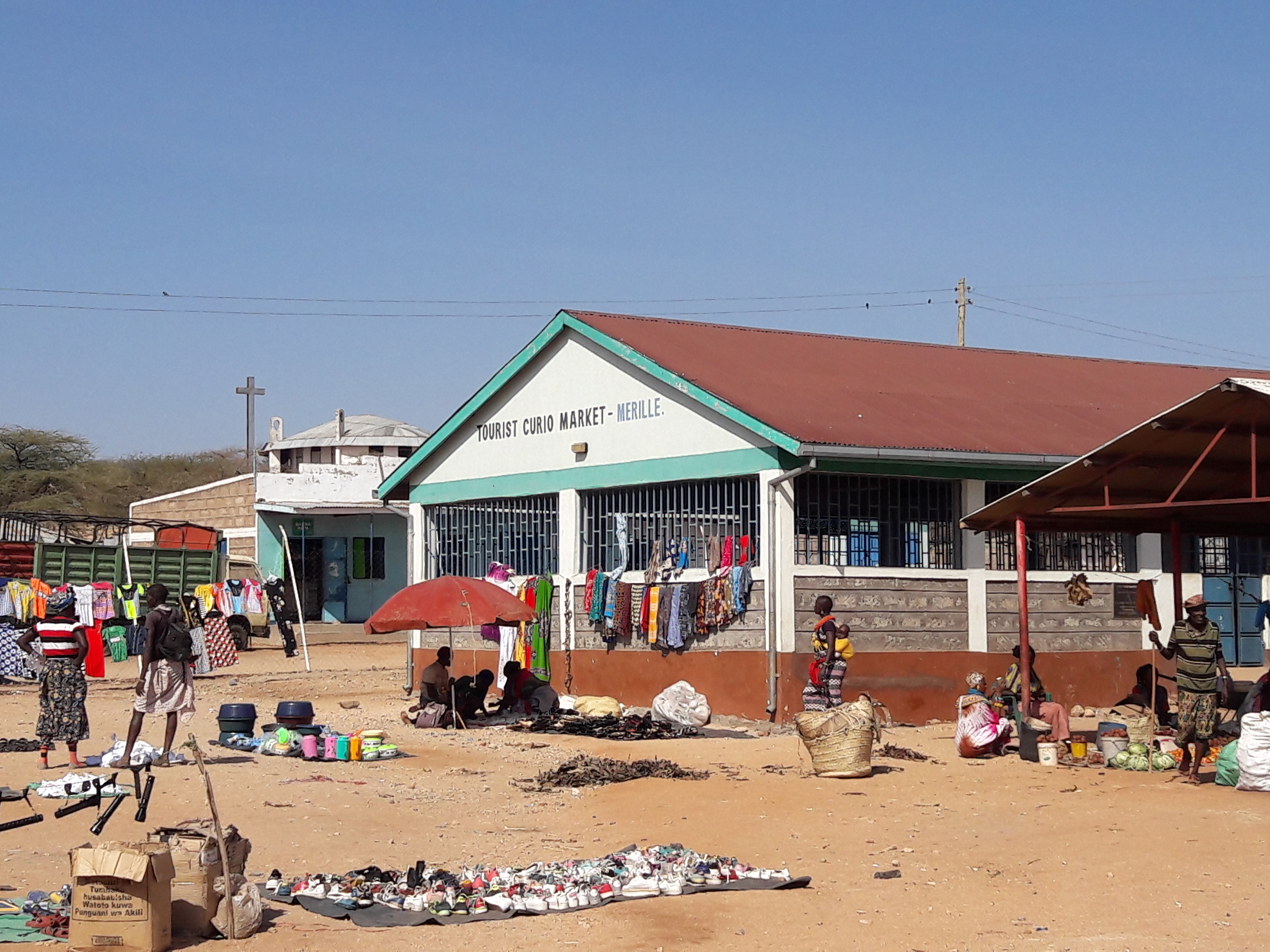
- Market in Merille

- Location in Kenya
- Coordinates: 1.41658°N 37.72287°E
- Country: Kenya
- County: Marsabit County
- Time zone: UTC+3 (EAT)

Merille is a village in Marsabit County in northern Kenya. It is an emerging urban centre along the Isiolo-Moyale Highway, 120 km south of Marsabit town. Merille got its name from samburu word meaning Market place, in early 90s Merille was the central place for barter trade, Somali, Rendille and Samburu meet in the area for exchange of goods.
