= Saku Constituency =

- Constituency
- Location of Saku Constituency in Marsabit County

Area
  - Total: 2,078 km^{2} (802 sq mi)

Population (2009)
  - Total: 46,502
  - Density: 22.38/km^{2} (57.96/sq mi)

Marsabit central (Saku Constituency) is an electoral constituency in Kenya. It is one of four constituencies in Marsabit County in Northern Kenya. It borders North Horr Constituency to the North and Laisamis Constituency to the South. The constituency was established for the 1988 elections. Marsabit town which is the county headquarters is in Saku constituency.

== Members of Parliament ==
Elections	MP	Party	Notes
1988	Jillo Jarso Falana	KANU	One-party system.
1992	Jillo Jarso Falana	KANU	
1997	Abdi Tari Sasura	KANU	
2002	Abdi Tari Sasura	KANU	Sasura died in an aviation accident in 2006.
2006	Hussein Sasura	KANU	By-elections
2007	Hussein Sasura	ODM-Kenya	
2022	Dido Ali	UDA	

== Locations and wards ==
Locations
Location	Population*
Badasa	2,898
D'akabarricha	5,119
Dirib Gombo	4,523
Karare	5,445
Mountain	8,943
Nagayo	7,530
Qilta	3,712
Sagante	3,886
Songa	3,498
Total	45,554
1999 census.

Wards
Ward	Registered Voters
Dakabaricha	2,714
Dirib Gombo	2,990
Karare	2,486
Mountain	4,763
Sagante	2,930
Total	15,883
*September 2005.
