= South Horr =

- Location within Kenya
- Coordinates: 2.09889°N 36.92065°E
- Country: Kenya
- County: Marsabit County
- Time zone: UTC+3 (EAT)

South Horr is a settlement in Kenya's former Rift Valley Province. It is located in Laisamis Constituency, of Marsabit County. The A4 Road from Maralal and Baragoi to Loyangalani passes through the village.
