= Rendille people =

Cushitic-speaking group from Kenya

Rendille
Beesha Rendile
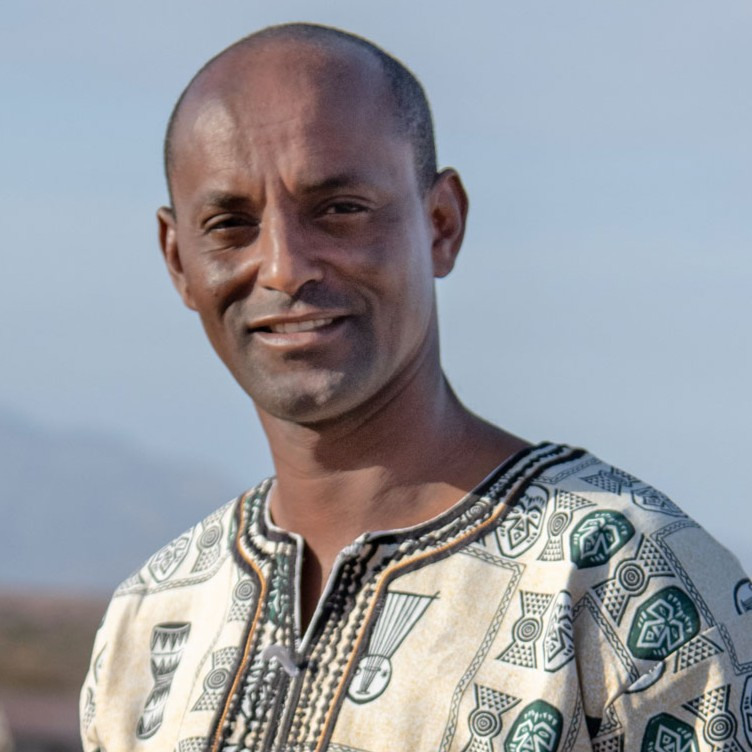

Total population
- 96,313

Regions with significant populations
- Kenya

Languages
- Rendille (mother tongue); English, Swahili (working languages)

Religion
- Traditional religion, Christianity, Islam

Related ethnic groups
- Aweer; Gabra; Sakuye; Borana; Oromo; Iraqw; afar

The Rendille people (also known as Rendille, Reendile, Rendili, Randali, Reerdiid , and Randille) are a Cushitic ethnic group inhabiting the Eastern Province of Kenya.

== Etymology ==
The ethnonym Rendille translates as "Holders of the Stick of God".

== Overview ==
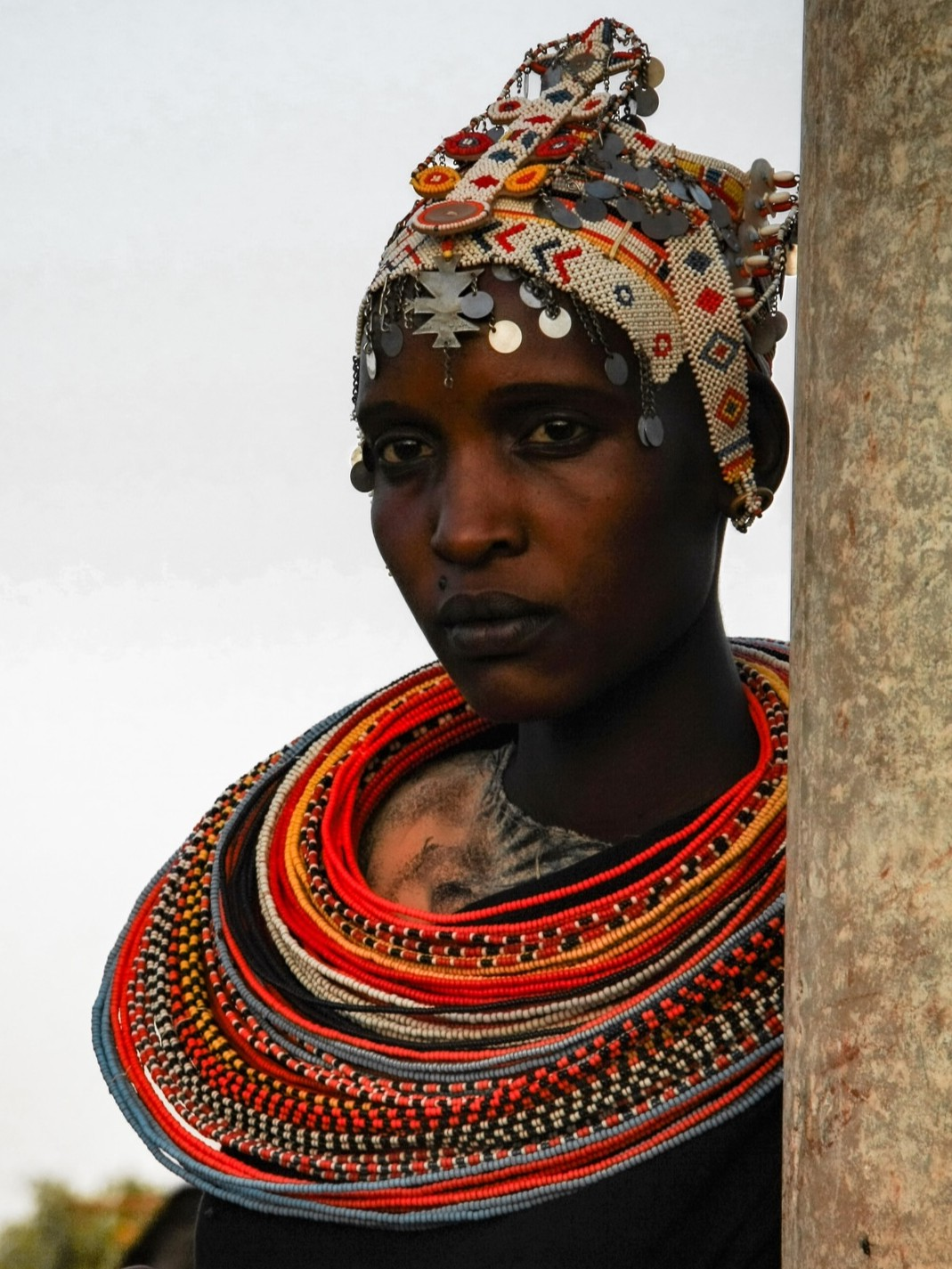
Rendille woman, Marsabit County

The Rendille are believed to have originally migrated down the Great Lakes after splitting off from the Cushitic-speaking peoples in the Horn region particularly Somali Zone of Ethiopia and Somalia, following wide population expansions by various Nilotic and Bantu ethnic groups.

Traditionally, they have been nomadic pastoralists, tending camels, sheep, goats and cattle. The camels were generally kept in the northern parts of their territory and the cattle in the southern section. The Rendille traditionally practice infibulation. This practice has its origins in Ancient Egypt which is well documented. According to Grassivaro-Gallo and Viviani, some people believe the custom was brought to the Horn of Africa from the Arabian Peninsula during antiquity.

=== History ===
Also known as the ‘Holders of the Stick of God’, the Rendille inhabit the climatically harsh regions between Marsabit County and Lake Turkana in Northern Kenya. They are neighbors of the Borana, Gabra, and Samburu. Believed to have originally migrated down the Great Lakes from Ethiopia, they were forced towards Mount Marsabit because of frequent conflicts with other ethnic groups over pasture and water for their animals.

Visually, the Rendille resemble other Cushitic groups particularly Somalis with their facial features. As such they are quite distinct from the Nilotic and Bantu peoples of Africa. Linguistically, the Rendille are closely related to Somalis. Culturally, they are the closest to the Gabra, who have similar ceremonial traditions because they are neighbors. They are nomadic pastoralists, caring for goats, black-head Somali sheep and camels which are mainly reared by Somali pastoralists.

One widely told story of their origin is that they descended from Somali people and were once Muslims. This is one of the most dominant reality based on their language, facial features, the animals they rear like camels as well as their nomadic lifestylees.

Since they lived on desert land with unfavorable climatic conditions, the British colonialists were not interested in overtaking their land and the Rendille was, therefore, not very affected by colonial rule in Kenya.

The first ethnological study of the Rendille was published at the turn of the 20th century by William A. Chanler. The study described the unmixed Rendille he encountered as tall, slender and reddish-brown in complexion, with soft, straight hair and narrow facial features. Chanler additionally remarked that many of the Rendille possessed "fierce" blue eyes, a physical peculiarity that was also later noted by Augustus Henry Keane (1900), John Scott Keltie (1904) and John Henry Patterson (1909).

== Distribution ==
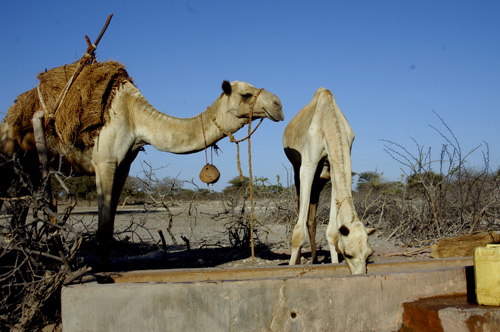
Camels in Marsabit, Kenya. Camels are the primary way Rendille people travel from main roads to remote locations in their region.

According to Ethnologue, there were approximately 94,700 Rendille speakers in 2006. Most are concentrated in the Kaisut Desert and Mount Marsabit in the Marsabit District of northern Kenya's Eastern Province.

== Language ==
The Rendille people speak the Rendille language as a mother tongue (also known as Rendile or Randile (as referred to by the neighbouring Samburu). It belongs to the Cushitic branch of the Afroasiatic family.

Additionally, some Rendille use English or Swahili as working languages for the purpose of communicating with other populations.

The Ariaal sub-group of the Rendille, who are of mixed Nilotic and Cushitic descent, speak the Eastern Nilotic Samburu language of the Samburu people with whom they cohabit.

== Genetics ==
Recent advances in genetic analyses have helped shed some light on the ethnogenesis of the Rendille people. Genetic genealogy, although a novel tool that uses the genes of modern populations to trace their ethnic and geographic origins, has also helped clarify the possible background of the modern Rendille.

=== mtDNA ===
According to an mtDNA study by Castri et al. (2008), the maternal ancestry of the contemporary Rendille consists of a mixture of Afro-Asiatic-associated lineages and Sub-Saharan haplogroups, reflecting substantial female gene flow from neighboring Sub-Saharan populations. About 30% of the Rendille belonged to the West Eurasian haplogroups I (15%), N1a (8%), M1a (3%) and R0/pre-HV (3%). The remaining samples carried various Sub-Saharan macro-haplogroup L sub-clades, mainly consisting of L0a (22%) and L2a (8%).

=== Autosomal DNA ===
The Rendille's autosomal DNA has been examined in a comprehensive study by Tishkoff et al. (2009) on the genetic affiliations of various populations in Africa. According to Bayesian clustering analysis, the Rendille generally grouped with other Afroasiatic-speaking populations inhabiting the Great Lakes region, with these lacustrine groups forming a cluster distinct from that of the Afroasiatic-speaking populations in the Horn of Africa, North Africa and the Sahara. This difference was attributed to marked genetic exchanges between the Rendille and neighboring Nilo-Saharan and Bantu communities.

== Religion ==
In terms of creed, the Rendille come from a practice of traditional religions centered around the worship of Waaq denoting the monotheistic archaic pre-Abrahamic religion adhered to by Cushitic groups.

More recently, the Rendille have come to adopt Christianity due to Christian missionary work throughout the 20th and 21st century. An increasing number of the Rendile practice Islam.

== Subdivisions ==
According to Spencer (1973), the Rendille are organized into an age grade system of patrilineal lineage groups (keiya), which are subsumed under fifteen clans (group). Of those, only nine are considered authentic Rendille. These Northern Rendille or Rendille proper are consequently the only ones that are included in the traditional Rendille moiety (belesi). The remaining six clans that are excluded from the moiety consist of mixed individuals. Five of those clans are of Rendille (Cushitic) and Samburu (Nilotic) descent. Collectively, the latter hybrid groups are referred to as the Ariaal or Southern Rendille. The Somalis draw a distinction between the "original" or "good" ethnic Rendille (known as asil), and the "bad" or assimilated Rendille ("those who speak Samburu").
