= Ali Mohamud Mohamed =

Kenyan politician

Ali Mohamud Mohamed is a Kenyan politician. He serves as the current governor of Marsabit County since 2017. He was elected governor on a jubilee party ticket. He is the Deputy Party Leader of United Democratic Movement that was formed in 2023. He previously was part of the Orange Democratic Movement and was duly elected to represent Moyale Constituency in the National Assembly of Kenya 2007 Kenyan parliamentary election.
