= Hubbie Hussein Al-Haji =

Kenyan women's rights activist

Hubbie Hussein Al-Haji, born in Garissa, Kenya (1958), is the executive director of WomenKind Kenya. She advocates for women's rights in water management and empowerment of local women to manage water distribution. Through her work, Al-Haji has been instrumental in helping the community develop and institutionalize innovative approaches to eradicate poverty, address human rights abuse, and empower women to foster community sustainability.

== Education ==
Al-Haji earned a diploma in Animal Health from Egerton University 1987, a certificate for community Development from Kenya Institute of Social and community Development Work (2000–2002), a Bachelor of Arts in Development studies from Kimmange Development Studies Center-Kimmange Ireland 2006–2008.

She was chief executive officer, Womankind Kenya 2008–2013.

Founded a society to (UNUL-KHEIR) to assist underprivileged women and children 1989–1994.

== Philosophical and/or political views ==
=== Female genital mutilation ===
Al-Haji sought work as a veterinary assistant in Garissa Kenya, after she earned her certification, and was denied on the belief that women who menstruate will make the cows die. Following this experience Al-Haji and a colleague initiated an NGO called WomenKind Kenya (WOKIKE) in 1989, established as an official NGO in 1995. Their mission is to train women in leadership, climate change resilience, child protection and peace building. Additionally, Al-Haji helped establish a sanctuary for girls at risk of female genital mutilation/cutting (FGM/C). In 2009, the center supported 120 girls aged six to eight.

=== Water management ===
Al-Haji strives to empower women to participate in water management committees in water-scarce Kenya. Privatization of water by international institutions have increased stressors over fresh water availability and deepened the inequality of women who fetch and cook with the water yet have little voice in the administration of water rights. Al-Haji was elected onto Garissa's water board in 2010. The WOKIEK group successfully enabled some communities to reclaim water as a human right. Their work in defense of women's water rights has encouraged Kenya to initiate a water reform project in 2002. With Al-Haji's input "the daily trek in search for 20 litres of water for a family of eight will soon be history" through Kenya's water reforms.

Al-Haji's work on the National Land Commission resulted in Kenyans gaining legal recognition of land rights and safeguarding public lands with fair policies. She continues to campaign for water reform as a key element in women's rights and quality of life in Kenya.

In 2011, WOKIEK worked to aid people fleeing the famine in Somalia who migrated into Kenya.

== Recognition ==
- In 2006, Al-Haji was awarded the Ralph Stone Memorial Award on women's leadership.
- In 2010, awarded with Moran of the Burning Spear by the President of Kenya
- 2010 Recognized by the UN Human Rights for exemplary performance on human rights
- 2011 Recognized by US Ambassador Michael E. Ranneberger for extraordinary efforts to promote the empowerment of Kenyan women and girls.
- In 2019 Al-Haji was appointed as a member of the Kenyan National Land Commission.
