= Sasura Hussein Tarry =

Kenyan politician

Sasura Hussein Tarry is a Kenyan politician. He belongs to the Orange Democratic Movement-Kenya, and was elected in 2007 to represent the Saku Constituency in the National Assembly of Kenya.
