= Ahmed (elephant) =

Elephant protected under Kenyan presidential decree

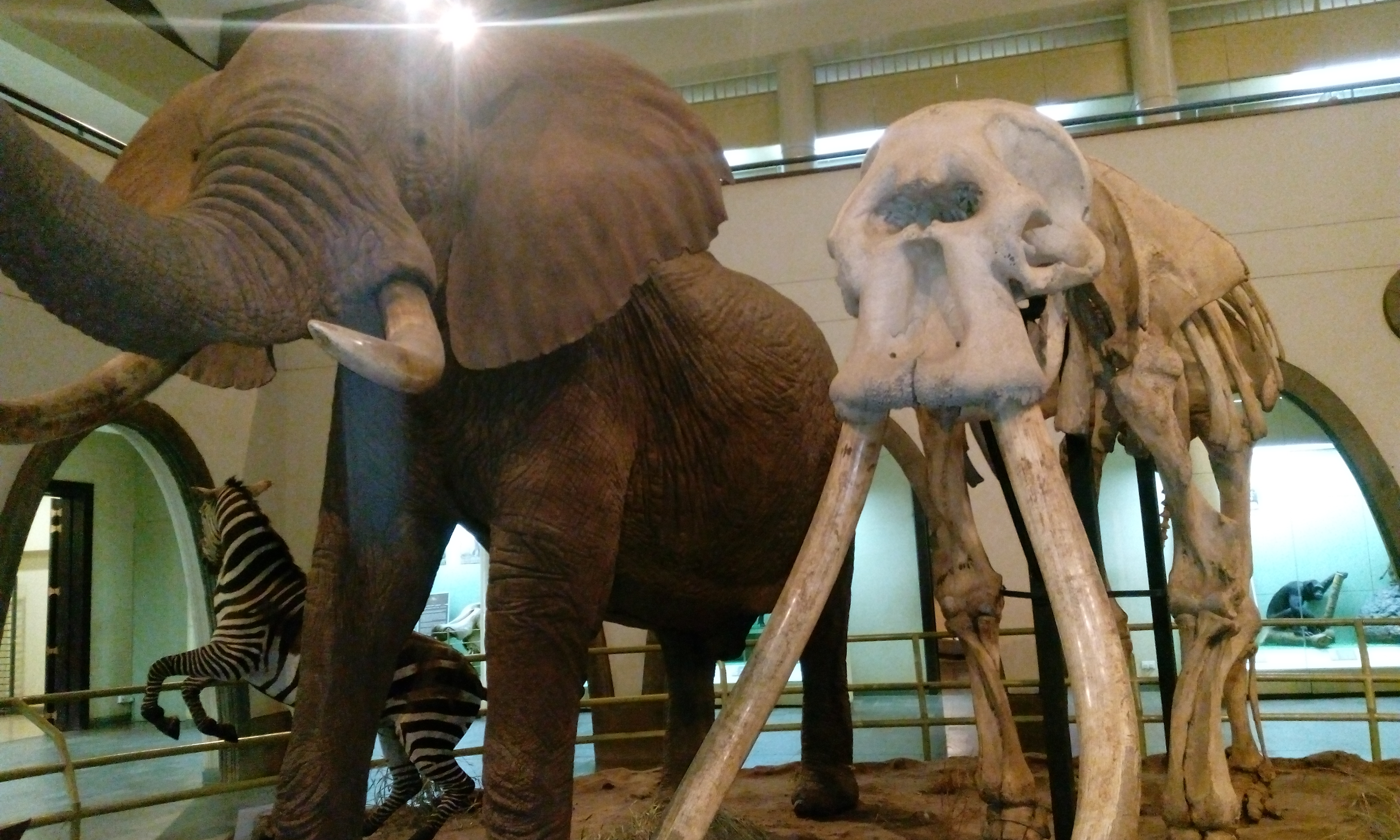
Skeleton belonging to Ahmed on display at Nairobi National Museum

Ahmed (1919–1974) was a Kenyan elephant with unusually large tusks.

He spent some of his time in the area of Mount Marsabit, and was the first elephant to be protected under Kenyan presidential decree. He was the subject of a Google Doodle on 6 December 2023.

Little is known about Ahmed the elephant's early life, but he gained his reputation in the 1960s after being spotted by hikers in the Northern Kenya mountains. Known as “The King Of Marsabit,” spotters claimed Ahmed’s tusks were so large they scraped the ground. The legend took hold across Kenya.

In 1970, Ahmed became the subject of many television projects, including an ABC series and a documentary. His rise in pop culture inspired school children to campaign for Ahmed’s protection from poachers. After they sent letters to Kenya’s first President Mzee Jomo Kenyatta, he placed Ahmed under his protection by Presidential Decree.

Two professional hunters watched over him day and night to preserve his life. After Ahmed died of natural causes at age 55, Kenya celebrated his legacy. President Kenyatta ordered taxidermists to preserve Ahmed for future generations at the Nairobi National Museum. He can still be seen there today.

== See also ==
- Isilo (elephant)
- Satao (elephant)
