= Laisamis Constituency =

- Constituency
- Location of Laisamis Constituency in Marsabit County

Area
  - Total: 20,266 km^{2} (7,825 sq mi)

Population (2009)
  - Total: 65,669
  - Density: 3.2404/km^{2} (8.3925/sq mi)

Laisamis Constituency is an electoral constituency in Kenya. It is one of four constituencies in Marsabit County. The entire constituency is located within Marsabit County Council area. The constituency was established for the 1988 elections. Formally known as Marsabit South, it was represented by Hon. Phillip Kurungu in the 1966 elections. From 1969-1988 Laisamis Constituency was represented by Hon. Haji Kholkhale Adichareh. Hon. Adichareh was a Lancaster House Conference delegate and a fierce defender of Rendille land. He served 7 years at Shimo La Tewa prison on trumped up charges before he emerged to lead his Rendille community for 20 years in parliament.

== Members of Parliament ==
Elections	MP	Party	Notes
1988	Hon. Samuel Ntontoi Bulyaar	KANU	One-party system.
1992	Hon. Robert Iltaramatwa Kochalle	KANU	
1997	Hon. Robert Iltaramatwa Kochalle	KANU	He died in 2018
2002	Hon, Titus Ngoyoni	KANU	Ngoyoni died in an aviation accident in 2006.
2006	Hon. Joseph Lekuton	KANU	By-elections
2007	Hon. Joseph Lekuton	KANU	
2013	Hon. Joseph Lekuton	ODM	
2017	Marselino Malimo Arbelle	Jubilee	
2022	Hon. Joseph Lekuton	UDM	13th Parliament of Kenya

== Locations and wards ==
Locations
Location	Population*
Illaut/Ngurunit	5,038
Kargi, Kenya	5,609
Korr	8,018
Laisamis	9,066
Logologo	4,057
Loiyangalani	8,049
Merille	3,032
Mount Kulal	3,910
South Horr	3,071
Total	49,850
1999 census.

Wards
Ward	Registered Voters
Korr	4,494
Laisamis	3,429
Logologo	1,763
Loiyangalani	2,077
Mount Kulal	1,077
South Horr	2,755
Total	15,595
*September 2005.
