= Dido Ali =

Kenyan politician and lawyer

Dido Ali is a Kenyan politician from the United Democratic Alliance. In the 2022 Kenyan general election, he was elected Member of Parliament for Saku.
