= Joseph Lekuton =

Kenyan politician

Joseph Lemasolai Lekuton CBS

Member of the National Assembly of Kenya
- In office 2007–2017
- Constituency: Laisamis
- In office 2022–present

Personal details
- Born: c. 1968 Karare, Kenya
- Party: Kenya Kwanza (since 2022)
- Other political affiliations: Orange Democratic Movement (before 2022)
- Education: St. Lawrence University
- Alma mater: Harvard Graduate School of Education (M.Ed.)
- Occupation: Politician, educator, author
- Known for: Facing the Lion: Growing Up Maasai in the African Savanna
- Awards: Chief of the Order of the Burning Spear (CBS)

Joseph Lemasolai Lekuton (born 1968 or 1969) is a Kenyan politician. He belongs to the Orange Democratic Movement (ODM) and was elected to represent the Laisamis Constituency in the National Assembly of Kenya since the 2007 Kenyan parliamentary election and reelected in 2013. He was not elected in 2017, but returned in 2022. He joined Kenya Kwanza after being elected in the 2022 general election.

== Early life and education ==
He comes from the village of Karare. In his early twenties, Lekuton left for America to study Government, Economics and History at St. Lawrence University in upstate New York. He taught at The Langley School in McLean, Virginia, before leaving for Harvard University where he earned a Master's degree in International Education policy at the Harvard Graduate School of Education.

== Career ==
His book Facing the Lion: Growing Up Maasai in the African Savanna was published by National Geographic. The book is about his life as a Maasai child up until the point of him graduating college.

Over the years, Lekuton has sought to improve the education standards among his nomadic community, believing that this is the surest way to upward social mobility. Through the Nomadic Kenyan Children Education Fund (www.nkcef.org) and the Boma Fund Inc, a number of Kenyan children have a decent shot at better life through education. For his hard work and tireless efforts, Lekuton was recognized by the Kenyan government – he is the youngest recipient of the presidential honor. In October 2015, Hon. Lekuton was recognized by the President of Kenya during the Mashujaa Day celebrations and awarded Chief of Burning Spear, First Class (CBS).
