= Roba Duba =

Kenyan politician

Roba Sharu Duba (born Robert Roba Duba) is a Kenyan politician and a member of the 11th Kenyan parliament elected from Moyale Constituency on the ticket of United Democratic Forum Party (UDF) in 2013. He was CEO of The Local Authorities Provident Fund and was town clerk in Moyale, Kilifi, Mombasa and Nairobi where he resigned from the service to run in the 2013 parliamentary election for Moyale Constituency seat. His legislative interest focuses on security and inter-communal peace particularly in Moyale.
