= National Land Commission =

Kenyan government agency

National Land Commission Commission
- NLC

Agency overview
- Formed: 2 February 2012; 14 years ago
- Headquarters: Nairobi, Kenya
- Motto: “Our Land, Our Wealth, Our Heritage”
- Agency executives: Gershom Otachi Bw’omanwa, Chairman; Kabale Tache Arero, CEO
- Website: Homepage

The National Land Commission of Kenya is an independent government commission whose establishment was provided for by the Constitution of Kenya to, amongst other things, manage public land on behalf of the national and county governments, initiate investigations into present or historical land injustices and recommend appropriate redress, and monitor and have oversight responsibilities over land use planning throughout the country. NLC was officially established under The National Land Commission Act of 2012.

== Roles and functions ==
The mandate of the National Land Commission is drawn from the National Land Policy of 2009, Constitution of Kenya 2010, National Land Commission Act of 2012, the Land Act 2012 and the Land Registration Act of 2012.

=== Constitution ===
Pursuant to Article 67(2) of the Constitution, the functions of the Commission shall be —

- to manage public land on behalf of the national and county governments;
- to recommend a national land policy to the national government;
- to advise the national government on a comprehensive programme for the registration of title in land throughout Kenya;
- to conduct research related to land and the use of natural resources, and make recommendations to appropriate authorities;
- to initiate investigations, on its own initiative; or on a complaint, into present or historical land injustices, and recommend appropriate redress;
- to encourage the application of traditional dispute resolution mechanisms in land conflicts;
- to assess tax on land and premiums on immovable property in any area designated by law; and
- to monitor and have oversight responsibilities over land use planning throughout the country.

=== National Land Commission Act ===
Under the National Land Commission Act, the Commission shall:

- on behalf of, and with the consent of the national and county governments, alienate public land;
- monitor the registration of all rights and interests in land;
- ensure that public land and land under the management of designated state agencies are sustainably managed for their intended purpose and for future generations;
- develop and maintain an effective land information management system at national and county levels;
- manage and administer all unregistered trust land and unregistered community land on behalf of the county government; and
- develop and encourage alternative dispute resolution mechanisms in land dispute handling and management.

(3) The Commission shall ensure that all unregistered land is registered within ten years from the commencement of this Act. Parliament may, after taking into consideration the progress of registration, extend the period set by the Commission under subsection.

(4) Within five years of the commencement of the NLC Act, the Commission, on its own motion or upon a complaint by the national or county government, a community or an individual review or grant disposition of public land to establish their propriety or legality.

(5) The Commission shall in consultation and corporation with the national and county governments, establish county land management boards for the purposes of managing public land.

=== Land Act ===
Under the Land Act 2012 The Commission shall:

- Implement Settlement programmes on behalf of national and county governments as outlined in section 134 of the Land Act.
- Administer the Land Settlement Fund in accordance with section 135 of Land Act
- Manage the Land Compensation Fund
- Identify ecologically sensitive areas that are within public land and demarcate and take any other justified action on those areas and act to prevent environmental degradation and climate change in accordance with the Land Act.
- Reserve public land for the establishment of approved settlement programmes, and where public land is not available, purchase private land subject to the Public Procurement and Disposal Act, 2005 or any other law as provided for in section 134 (5) of the Land Act.
- Set aside land for investment purposes in accordance with section 12(3) of the Land Act.
- Approve compulsory acquisitions, wayleaves, easements and analogous rights.
- Ensure that the investments, in land benefit local communities and their economies.
- Make regulations prescribing the criteria for allocation of public land, such regulations to prescribe forms of ownership and access to land under all tenure systems.
- The procedure and manner of setting aside land for investment should respect mechanisms of benefit sharing with local communities.
- Undertake an inventory of all land based natural resources upon coming into force of the Land Act as stipulated in section 15(3) of the Land Act.

=== Land Registration Act ===
Under the Land Registration Act, 2012, the Commission shall:

- Constitute registration units in consultation with national and county governments
- Determine the form of a land register that shall be maintained, in each registration unit,
- Appoint a date for geo–referencing plans to be kept in a land registry;
- Serve as the depository of maps; the office or authority responsible for the survey of land shall submit to the Commission a copy of the cadastral maps for depositing
- Prescribe (through regulations) guidelines that the registrar shall follow before question has been obtained by fraud.
- Advice the cabinet secretary in making regulations, rules or prescribing any matters required under this Act and such regulations or rules shall be tabled before Parliament.

== Composition ==
The establishment of the Commission was delayed due to disagreements between then President Mwai Kibaki and Prime Minister Raila Odinga of who should sit on the Commission. The nomination process was then stopped after being challenged in court in late 2012. On 5 February 2013, the High Court ordered President Kibaki to gazette the names of the commissioners within 7 days.

In April 2014, the NCL sought the Supreme Court’s opinion regarding its functions and mandate in relation to those of the Ministry of Lands. "In December 2015, the five-judge bench declared that the NLC had a mandate in respect of various processes leading to the registration of land, but neither the Constitution nor statute law gave it the power to register land titles".

As of 7 September 2019, the following had been nominated as Members of the National Land Commission of Kenya:

- Gershom Otachi Bw’omanwa: Chairman
- Kazungu Kambi
- Esther Murugi
- Tiya Galgo
- Reginald Okumu
- Alister Murimi Mutugi
- James Tuitoek
- Getrude Nduku Nduku
- Al-Haji Hubbie Hussein

As of July 2019 Kabale Tache Arero served as the chief executive officer, in acting capacity and concurrently as substantive director of human resource management till June 19, 2023, where she was confirmed and sworn into office as the chief executive officer of the National Land Commission.
