= Gabra people =

Ethnic group

Gabra
Gabraa
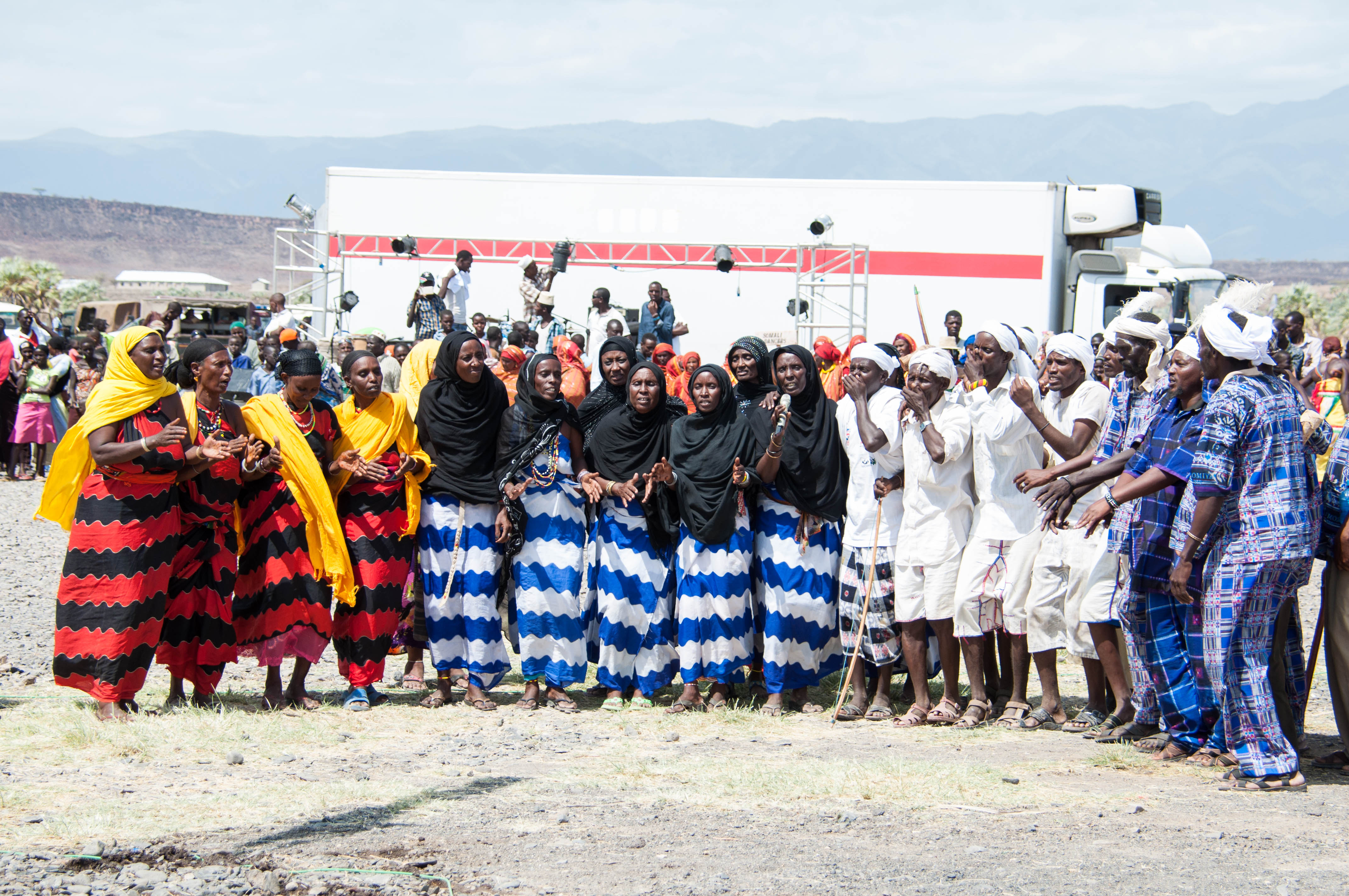
- Gurreh dancers of the Gabra tribe

Total population
- c. 700,000

Regions with significant populations
- Ethiopia: 520,010 (2007)
- Kenya: 141,200 (2019)

Languages
- Southern Oromo

Religion
- Islam

Related ethnic groups
- Boorana; Somalis; Rendille; other Cushitic peoples

The Gabra are related to the wider Cushite in the Horn of Africa, They mainly inhabit the Moyale and Marsabit regions of northern Kenya and the highlands of southern Ethiopia. They mostly practice Islam and Christianity as religion, but maintain mandatory cultural practices..

== Genetics ==
According to Y-DNA analysis by Hirbo in 2011, around 82.6% of Gabra in Kenya carry the paternal E1b1b haplogroup, with most belonging to the V12 subclade (58.6%). This lineage is most common among local Afroasiatic-speaking populations. The remaining Gabra individuals bear the T/K2 (3.4%) and J haplogroups (3.4%), which are both also associated with Afroasiatic speakers, as well as the E3*/E-P2 clade (3.4%) and E2a lineage (3.4%).

Maternally, Hirbo observed that approximately 58% of the Gabra samples carried derivatives of the Eurasian macrohaplogroups M and N. Of these mtDNA lineages, the M1 subclade was most common, with around 22.58% of the Gabra individuals belonging to it. The remaining ~42% of the analysed Gabra bore various subclades of the Africa-centered macrohaplogroup L. Of these mtDNA lineages, the most frequently borne clade was L3 (19.36%), followed by the L0a (9.68%), L4 (9.68%), and L2 (6.45%) haplogroups.

The Gabra's autosomal DNA has been examined in a comprehensive study by Tishkoff et al. (2009) on the genetic affiliations of various populations in Africa. According to Bayesian clustering analysis, the Gabra generally grouped with other Afroasiatic-speaking populations inhabiting Northern Kenya.

=== Gallery ===
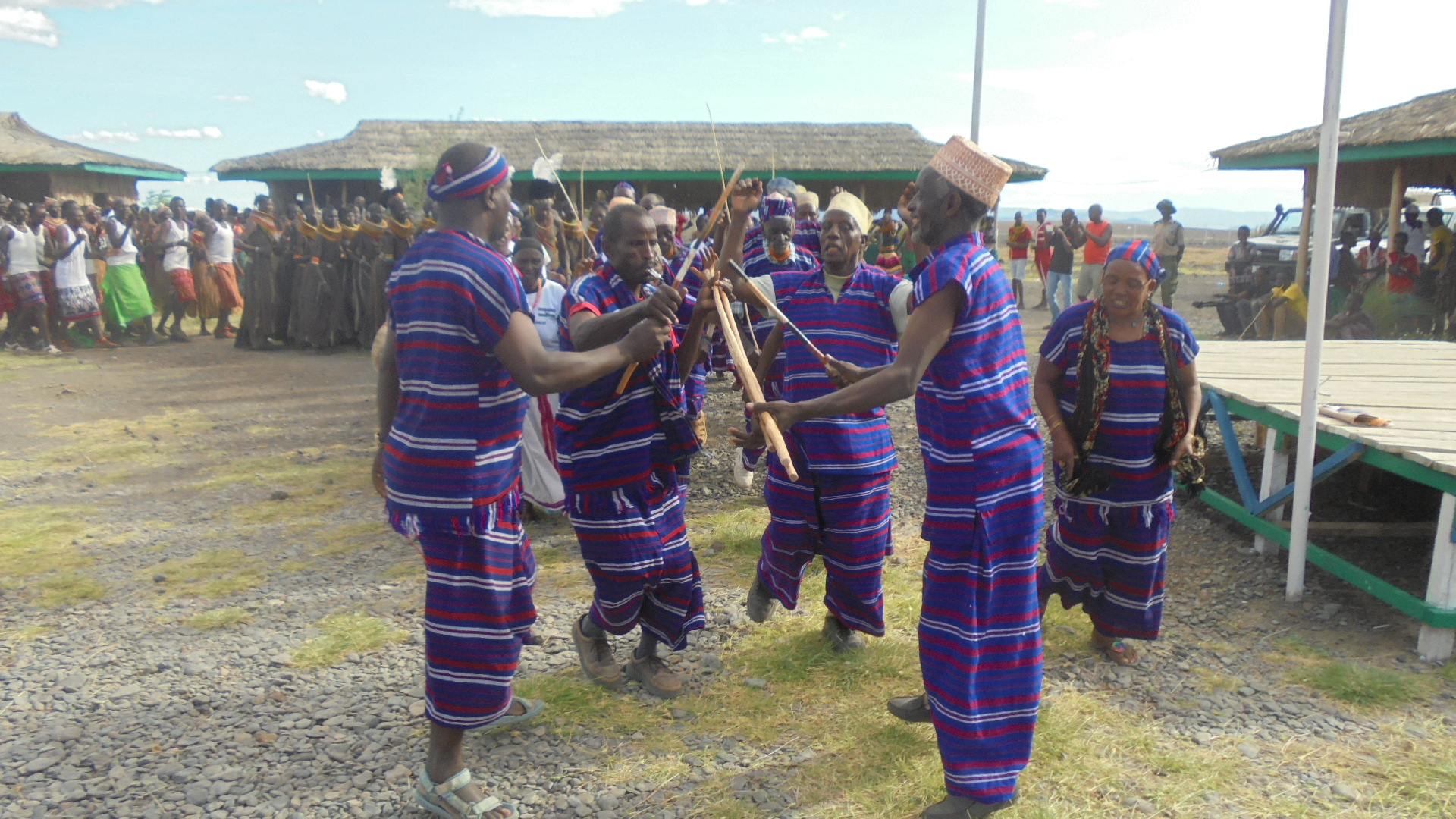
Gabbra community

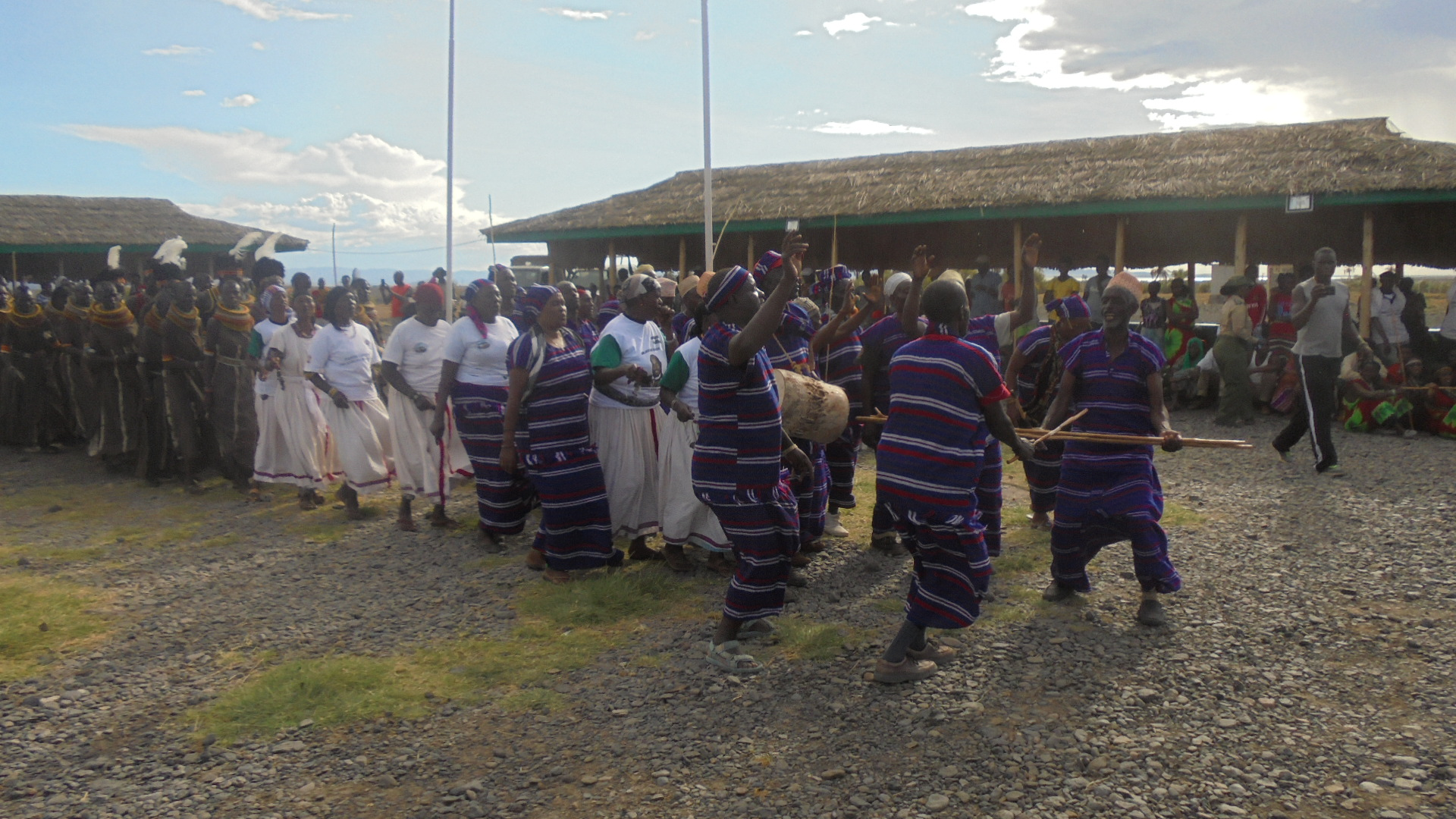
Gabbra community performing folk dance. Gabbra women wear a long, usually colored dress

== See also ==
- Rendille people
- Chalbi Desert
