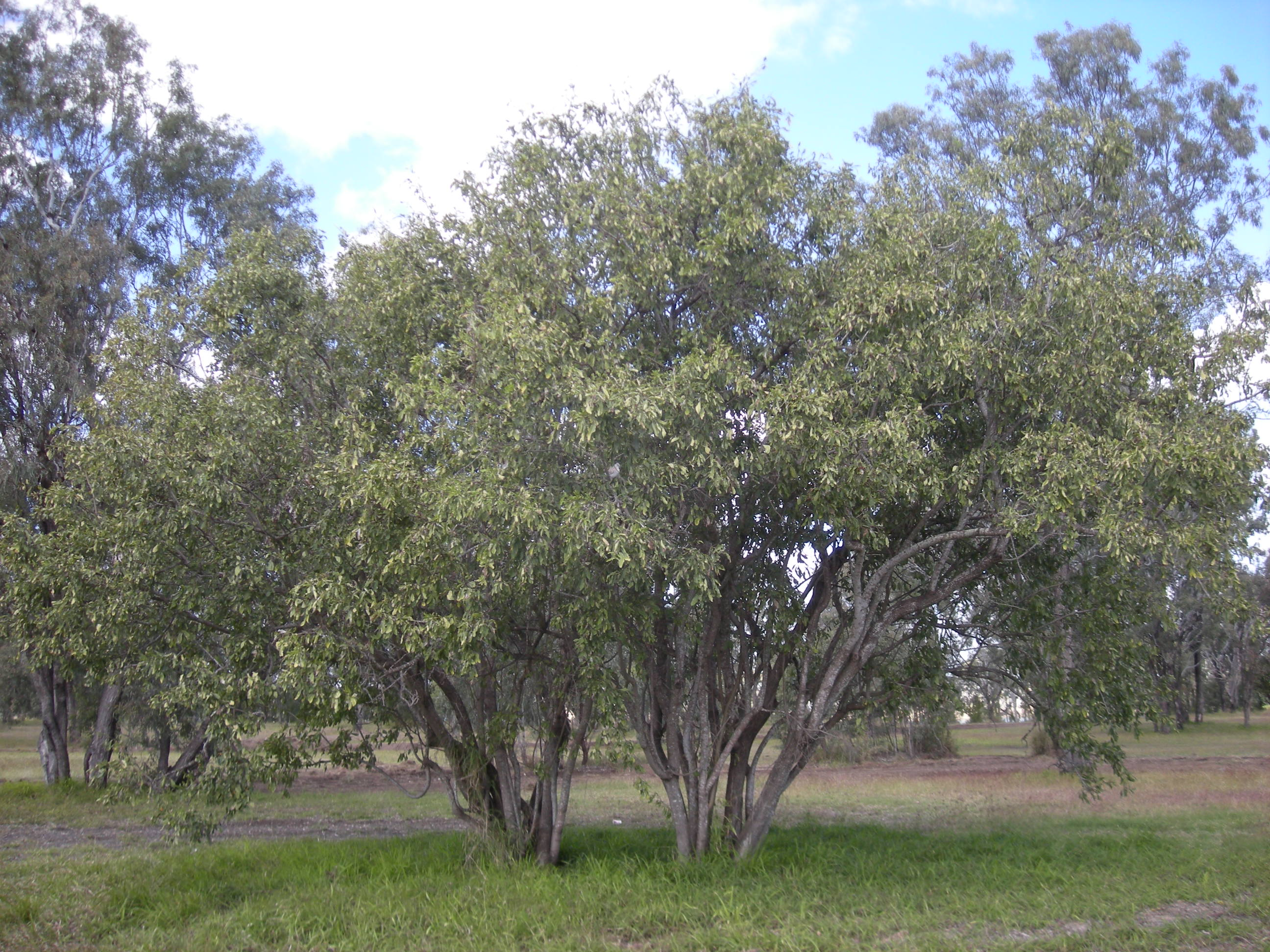

Conservation status
- Least Concern (IUCN 3.1)

Scientific classification
- Kingdom: Plantae
- Clade: Tracheophytes
- Clade: Angiosperms
- Clade: Eudicots
- Clade: Asterids
- Order: Boraginales
- Family: Cordiaceae
- Genus: Cordia
- Species: C. sinensis

Binomial name
- Cordia sinensis Lam.

Synonyms
- List: Cordia angustifolia Roxb.; Cordia cuneata B.Heyne ex A.DC.; Cordia gharaf Ehrenb. ex Asch.; Cordia oblongifolia Hochst. ex A.DC.; Cordia reticulata Roth; Cordia rothii Roem. & Schult.; Cordia subopposita A.DC.; Gerascanthus gharaf (Ehrenb. ex Asch.) Borhidi; Gerascanthus sinensis (Lam.) Borhidi; Lithocardium rothii (Roem. & Schult.) Kuntze; Quarena sinensis (Lam.) Raf.

= Cordia sinensis =

Species of tree

Cordia sinensis is a species of flowering tree in the family Cordiaceae. Common names include grey-leaved saucer berry, grey-leaved cordia, marer, mnya mate, mkamasi and tadana. It is found in Africa and Asia.

== Description ==
C. sinensis exhibits a range of growth forms, from low shrub to a multi-stemmed tree up to 12 metres (39 ft) in height. The stem bark is brown to cream brown. The flowers are white or cream in colour. The fruit is conical, orange or red with a fleshy, viscid pulp overlying a 1–4 large seeds.

== Distribution and habitat ==
The species' range extends from South Africa, through East Africa, Madagascar, West Africa and the Middle East to the Indian subcontinent and Eastern Indochina. There is also a disjunct native population in Senegal. The species has become naturalised in Eastern Australia.

It is native to Egypt, Ethiopia, India, Israel, Jordan, Kenya, Madagascar, Mozambique, Namibia, Niger, Pakistan, Senegal, Somalia, South Africa, Sri Lanka, Sudan, Tanzania, Yemen and Zimbabwe. It is a tree of arid and semi-arid regions, often in riparian zones.

== Ecology ==
The fruit are an important food for monkeys and birds. The leaves provide browse for animals such as antelope, giraffe and deer.

== Uses ==
The fruits are edible and are eaten in a variety of cuisine. The gum from the tree is also edible. The timber is used as firewood and for making furniture and tools. The leaves are an important source of animal fodder. Both roots and bark are used to treat a variety of disorders in both humans and livestock, including malaria, intestinal disorders and conjunctivitis.

In Turkana, the fruit is often eaten fresh, or collected into large quantities, dried, and stored. After storage it is rehydrated for consumption. The fruit is also used for juice, or to make beer, sometimes mixed with tamarind prior to fermentation.

In the Tanout and Gouré Departments of Niger, the juicy pulp of the fruits is cooked down into a thick syrup locally called kango, which serves as a sweetener for porridges and can be preserved for a long time.

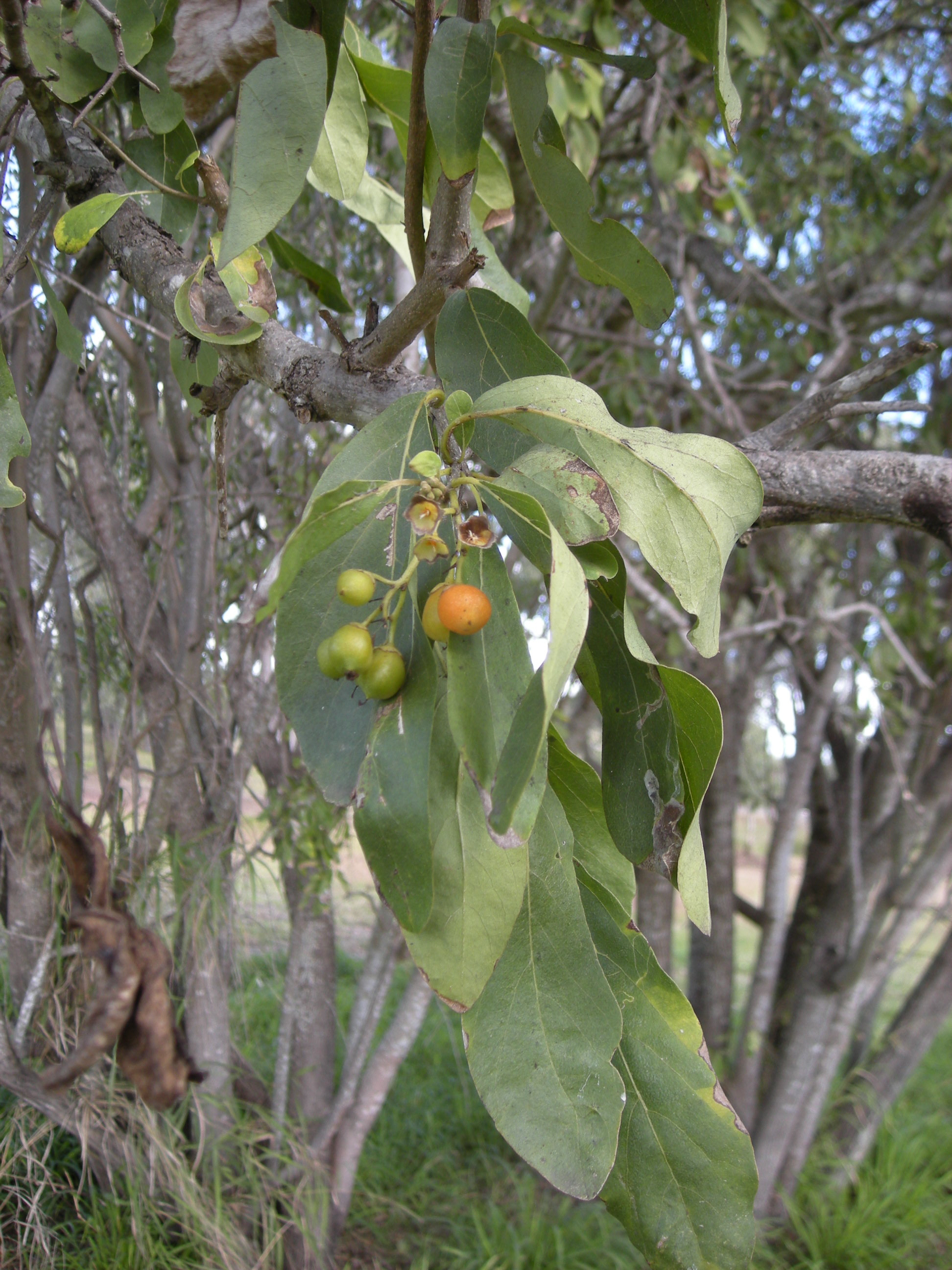
Cordia sinensis fruits.

== Regional names ==
C. sinensis (Latin) has a variety of names in local languages. These include Harores, Mader, Mader boor, Mader qoowe (Boran); Mkayukayu (Chonyi); Madeer (Gabra); Mderia, Mkayukayu (Giriama); Tadana (Hausa); Salapani, Lgweita (Ilchamus); Kithea, Muthei munini, Kithia (Kamba); Nokirwet (Kipsigis); Oldorko (Maasai); Mutalya chana (Riverine, Tana River), Mutaa1e (Malakote); Adomoyon (Marakwet); Mader (Orma); Muhale, Mhali (Pokomo); Adomeyon, Adome (fruit only) (Pokot); Gaer, Koh, Madeer, Gayer (Rendille); Ilgoita, Ikweite, Dorgo, Lmanturre, Lgueita, Lgweita orok, Silapani (Samburu); Hoorocha (Sanya); Mareer, Marer (Somali); Mkamasi, Mnya mate (Swahili); Adumewa, Edoma (leaves), Adomewa (Tugen); Edome (Turkana); Marer (Wardei).
