= Ilbisil =

- Location within Kenya
- Coordinates: 2.1°S 36.78°E
- Country: Kenya
- Province: Rift Valley Province
- Time zone: UTC+3 (EAT)
- Climate: BSh

Ilbisil is a settlement in Kenya's Rift Valley Province.

== Geography ==
Ilbisil is a savannah from which it is possible to see Mount Kilimanjaro's snow cap on clear days.
