= Sololo =

- Town
- Location within Kenya
- Coordinates: 3.56325°N 38.64371°E
- Country: Kenya
- Province: Marsabit County

Population (2009)
  - Total: 5,104
- Time zone: UTC+3 (EAT)

Sololo is a small town in Kenya's former Eastern Province, now part of Marsabit County. It is the 4th largest urban centre in Marsabit County with a population of 5,104.

Sololo is located on the Moyale-Sololo escarpment which has semi-arid climatic conditions. The town is connected with electricity from Ethiopia, which is only about 5 km away.
