= Marsabit =

- Town
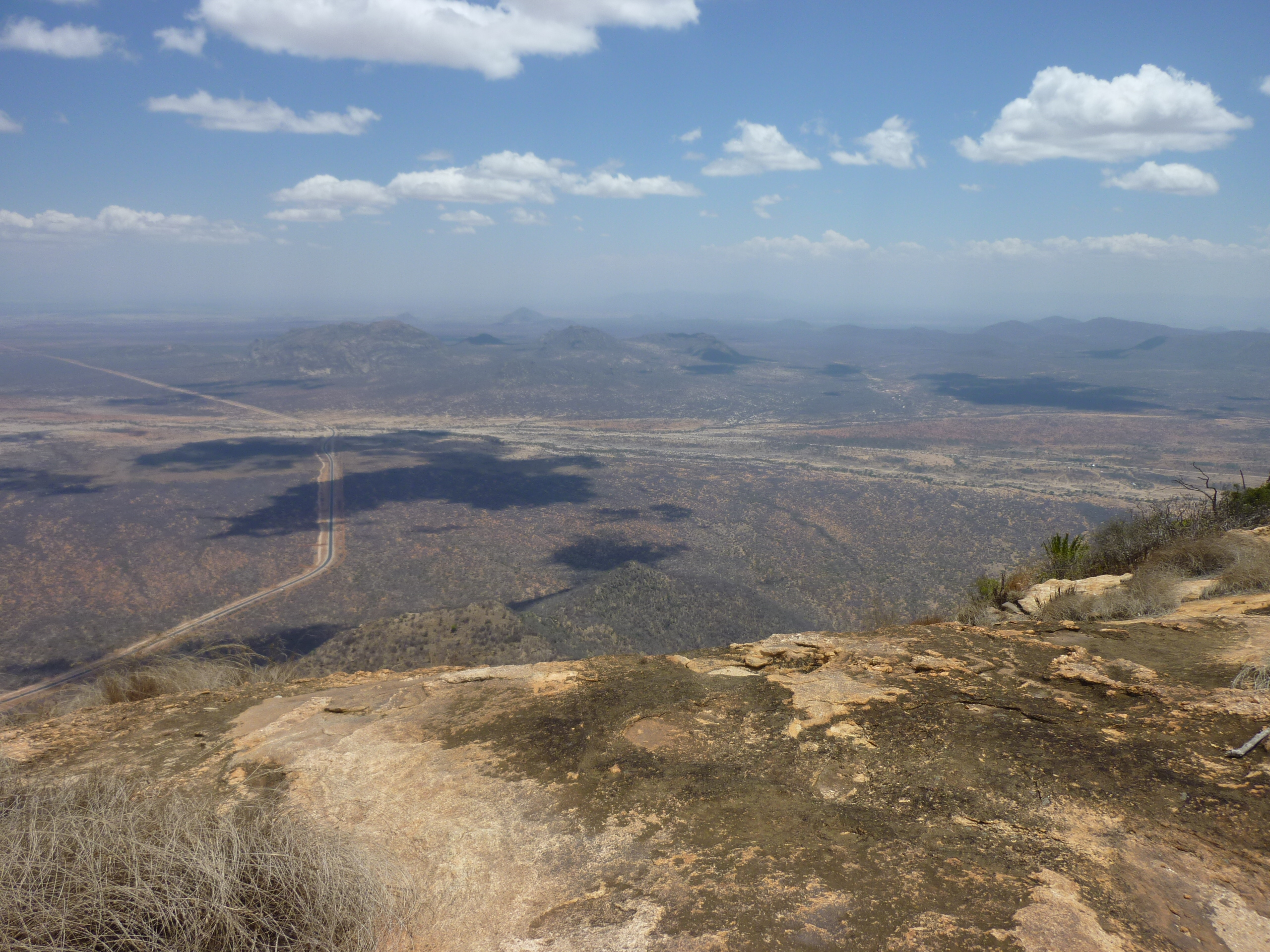
- The Marsabit-Moyale road.

- Location within Kenya Location within the Horn of Africa Location within Africa
- Coordinates: 2°20′00″N 37°59′00″E
- Country: Kenya
- County: Marsabit County
- Elevation: 1,350 m (4,430 ft)
- Time zone: UTC+3 (EAT)

Marsabit is a town in northern Marsabit County, Kenya. It is situated in the former Eastern Province and is almost surrounded by the Marsabit National Park. The town is located 170 kilometres (110 mi) east of the centre of the East African Rift at an elevation of 1,300–1,400 metres (4,300–4,600 ft). It serves as the capital of Marsabit County, and lies southeast of the Chalbi Desert in a forested area known for its volcanoes and crater lakes.

== Overview ==
Marsabit is an outpost of urban civilization in the desert of northern Kenya. The town is situated on an isolated extinct volcano, Mount Marsabit, which rises almost a kilometer above the desert. Thick vegetation stretches across the hill slopes, in contrast to the desert beyond, with their own "insular" eco-system. The town has a population of about 5,000.

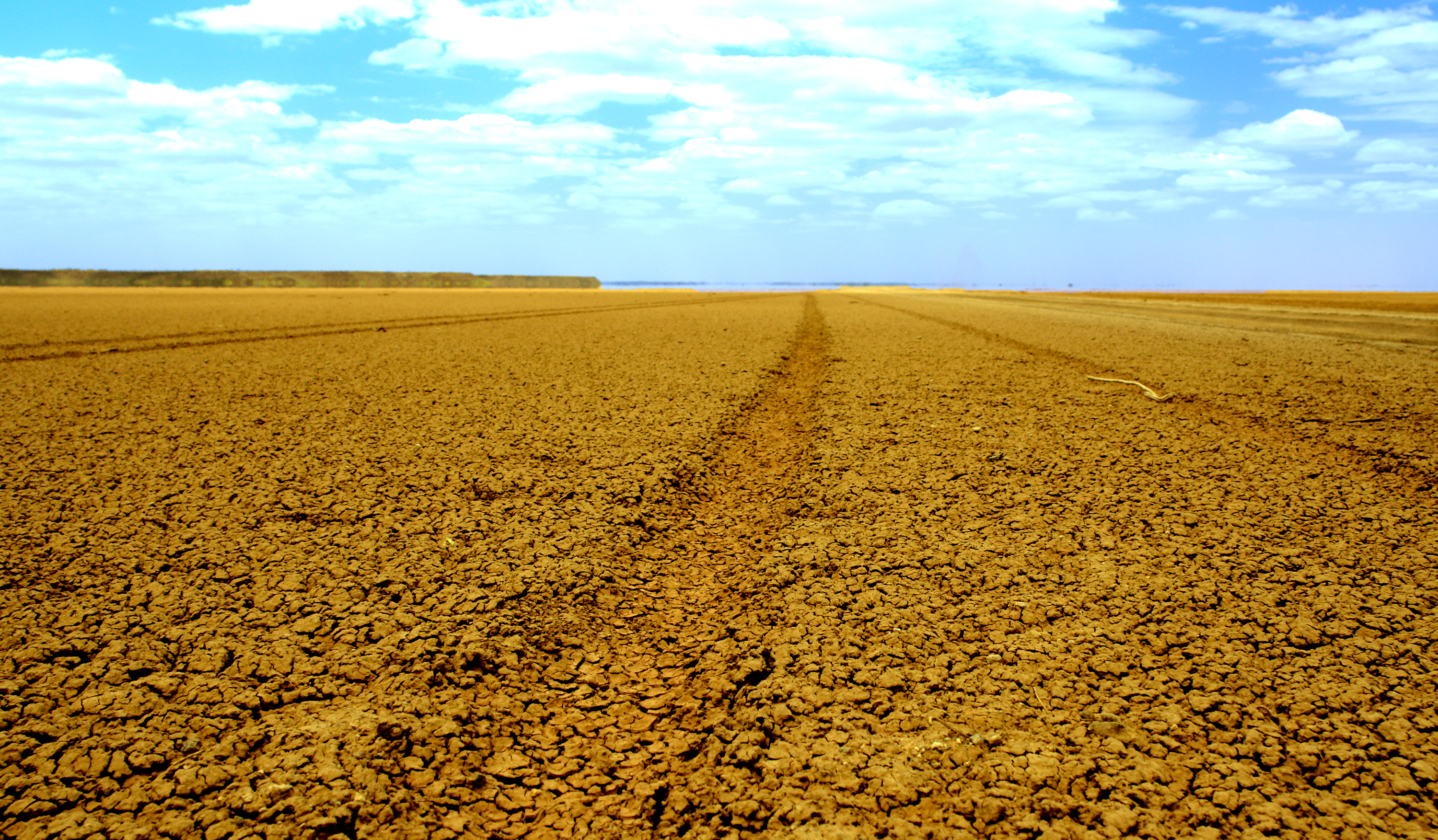
Marsabit is located southeast of the Chalbi Desert.

The town is mainly inhabited by the Cushitic-speaking Rendille, as well as the Borana, Gabra,Garre, Sakuye and Burji, who are mostly traders and farmers with settlements in urban centres. There are also very few Nilotic Turkana and Bantu Ameru residents. Additionally, there are also few non-Cushitic-speaking traders.

Marsabit has an airstrip and a mountain peak (Mount Marsabit), with "singing" wells just outside the town. Elephants and buffalos can also often be seen in the local wildlife refuge that surrounds the town, occasionally breaking down fences and causing damage to local farmers' crop beds. While the famous elephant named 'Ahmed' was found living in Marsabit, President Jomo Kenyatta through his office gave a special Protection Order to protect the Elephants of Marsabit and entire wildlife from poachers. Later in the year 1974, the elephant was found dead - succumbing to natural causes, - found under a tree by his two armed guards unfortunately passed on at the age of 55 years. Ahmed was ordered under tight security to be preserved at the National Museum of Kenya in Nairobi for future generations to see and admire the giant treasure of nature once found in Marsabit. (Orre P.)

The name is possibly from the Amharic word ማርሳቤት marsa bet, meaning 'Marsa's home/house', and is believed to have been named after a farmer named 'Marsa' (an ethnic Burji) who was brought to Marsabit from Mega (in Ethiopia) by the Consul to assist in consolidation of farming and permanent settlement on the slopes of Mount Marsabit. However, Colonial explorers occasionally interacted with locals, the herdsmen to point to the mountains on their expedition while in the lowlands. The Cushitic speaking Rendille of Marsabit many atimes pronounce the place as indication of dark clouds engulfing the top peak of the mountains, thus mar-sabichor Haal-dayan. Haal means mountain, and 'dayan' means 'dark' which truly show dark mountain from a considerable distance view. Same in Rendille, the word mar means 'rainy/drizzling clouds', and sabich means 'engulfing'. In addition, the same communities also at some point claim first explorers to have named the place "Mar-a-bit" on hearing what local Rendille pronounce while pointing the mountains. This is said to be an English phrase accent, consisting of the archaic verb mar and the complement a bit. The verb mar means 'to impair the quality or appearance of', describing higher cold altitude.

== Culture and religion ==
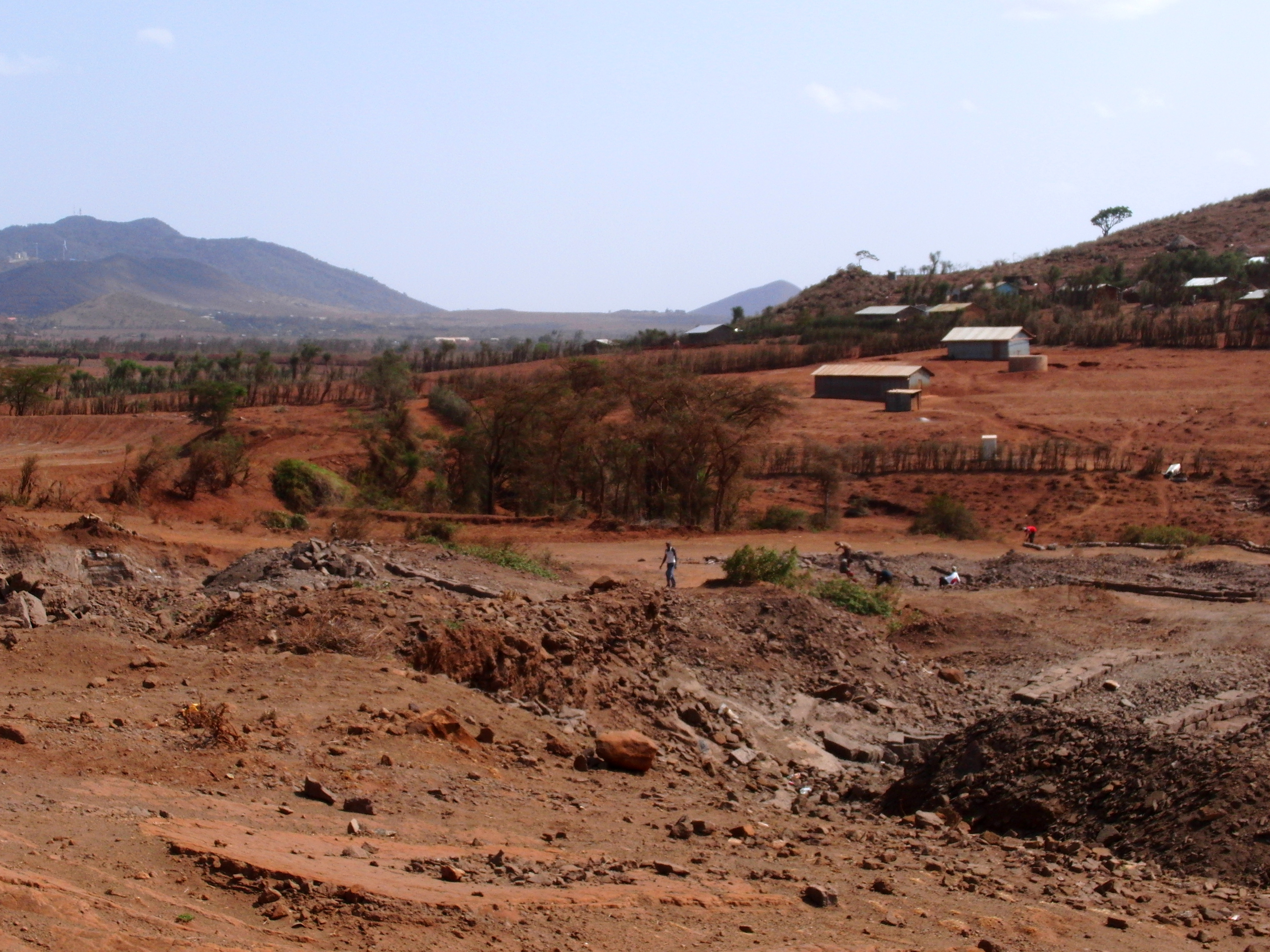
Stone pit right outside the far out town of Marsabit.

In addition to the ethnic groups already listed, there are other people from other parts of Kenya who are there working mostly for the government and business. Muslims, Christians and adherents of traditional religions all inhabit the town.

Marsabit was the announced location for a conference between Borana and Gabra elders scheduled for 2–6 June 2009. Discussions to resolve existing conflicts between the two groups have been underway for several years now, and agreements were expected to be sealed at the event at this conference in the presence of traditional leaders.

== Transport ==
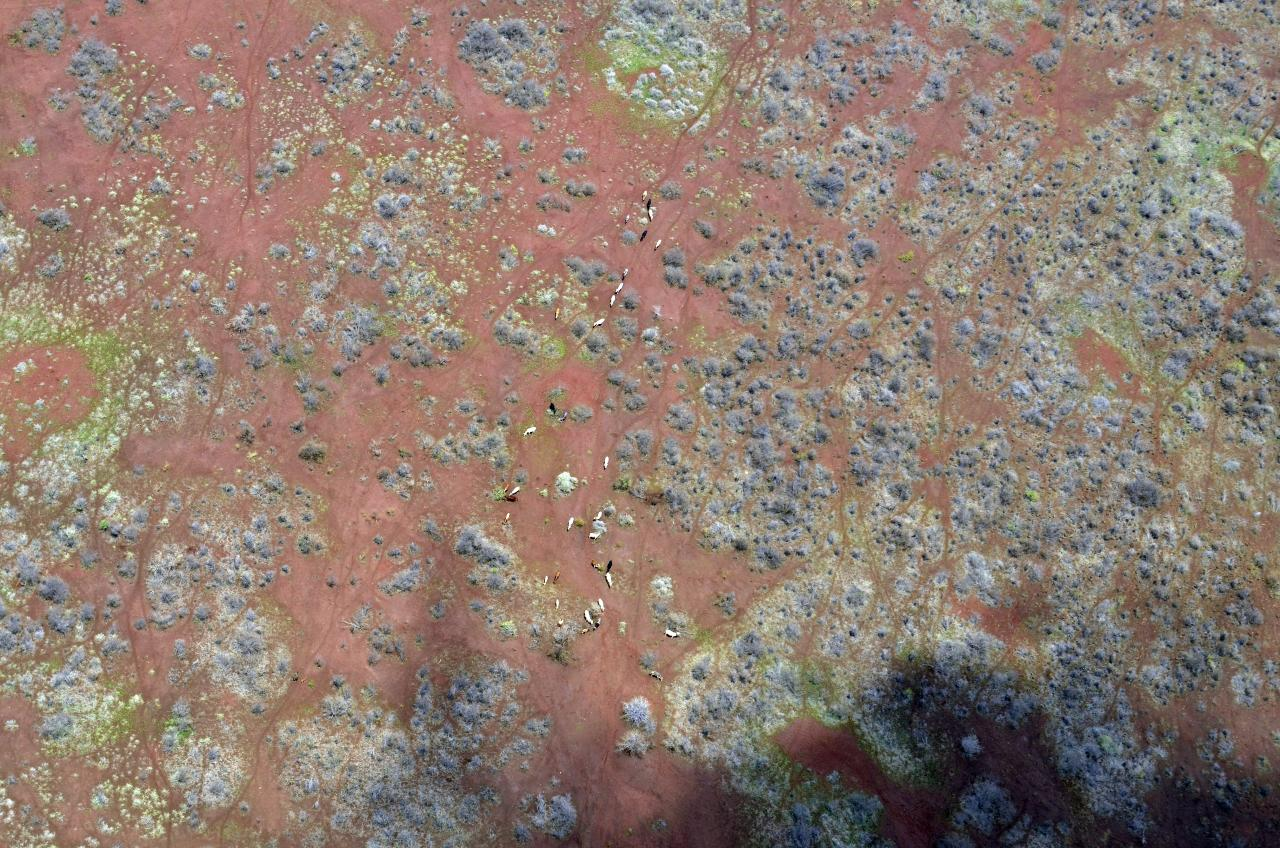
Aerial view of area on the outskirts of Marsabit.

Marsabit is approximately 550 kilometres (340 mi) from Nairobi via the towns of Isiolo and Archers Post. Reaching the town formerly required private transport, but there are now several bus services on the route from Isiolo to Marsabit, and from Nairobi to Moyale via Marsabit. Christine Allen, of CAFOD, describes the road as "dangerously busy". The road is tarmac to bitumen standards and connects to the Ethiopia–Kenya border at Moyale. It is approximately 277 kilometres (172 mi) from Isiolo.

There are two airstrips servicing charter aircraft, one close to town on the road towards Moyale (Marsabit Airstrip), and the second further away towards Chalbi (Segel Airstrip). The Mission Aviation Fellowship (MAF) operates the only regular flight to Marsabit, on Tuesdays and Fridays.

== Economy ==
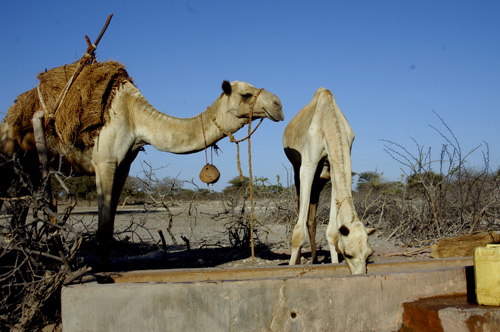
Camels watering in Marsabit.

Marsabit town is a trading and commercial centre, which facilitates the supply and movement of goods and services between Moyale (goods from Ethiopia) and Isiolo (goods from Nairobi). Agriculture also plays a role, as many grow millet and maize to be consumed locally and nomadic people supply beef by selling their cows.

Lake Paradise (which attracts game animals such as elephants and buffalo), and Bongole Crater located in the heart of the forest are both local attractions for tourists. The town and surrounding area are of rich cultural interest to anthropologists and other researchers.

== Climate ==
Marsabit has an altitude-influenced dry-summer tropical savanna climate (Köppen: As), very slightly above the hot semi-arid climate (BSh) found in nearby lowlands. The town is very windy. It is under the influence of an atmospheric feature known as the 'Turkana Jet', which is a strong southeasterly wind originating from the Indian Ocean. The Kenya Meteorological Department run a WMO weather station in Marsabit.

Climate data for Marsabit
Month	Jan	Feb	Mar	Apr	May	Jun	Jul	Aug	Sep	Oct	Nov	Dec	Year
Mean daily maximum °C (°F)	25.0 (77.0)	25.7 (78.3)	25.7 (78.3)	24.9 (76.8)	24.8 (76.6)	24.4 (75.9)	23.8 (74.8)	24.1 (75.4)	25.1 (77.2)	25.2 (77.4)	23.8 (74.8)	24.2 (75.6)	24.7 (76.5)
Mean daily minimum °C (°F)	15.7 (60.3)	15.9 (60.6)	16.2 (61.2)	16.7 (62.1)	16.1 (61.0)	14.6 (58.3)	13.8 (56.8)	13.5 (56.3)	14.0 (57.2)	15.4 (59.7)	16.0 (60.8)	15.9 (60.6)	15.3 (59.5)
Average rainfall mm (inches)	92 (3.6)	60 (2.4)	91 (3.6)	149 (5.9)	54 (2.1)	14 (0.6)	17 (0.7)	8 (0.3)	9 (0.4)	62 (2.4)	91 (3.6)	46 (1.8)	693 (27.3)
Average rainy days	6	3	7	9	5	4	3	4	2	6	9	6	64
Source: World Meteorological Organization
