= Mount Marsabit =

Basaltic shield volcano in Kenya

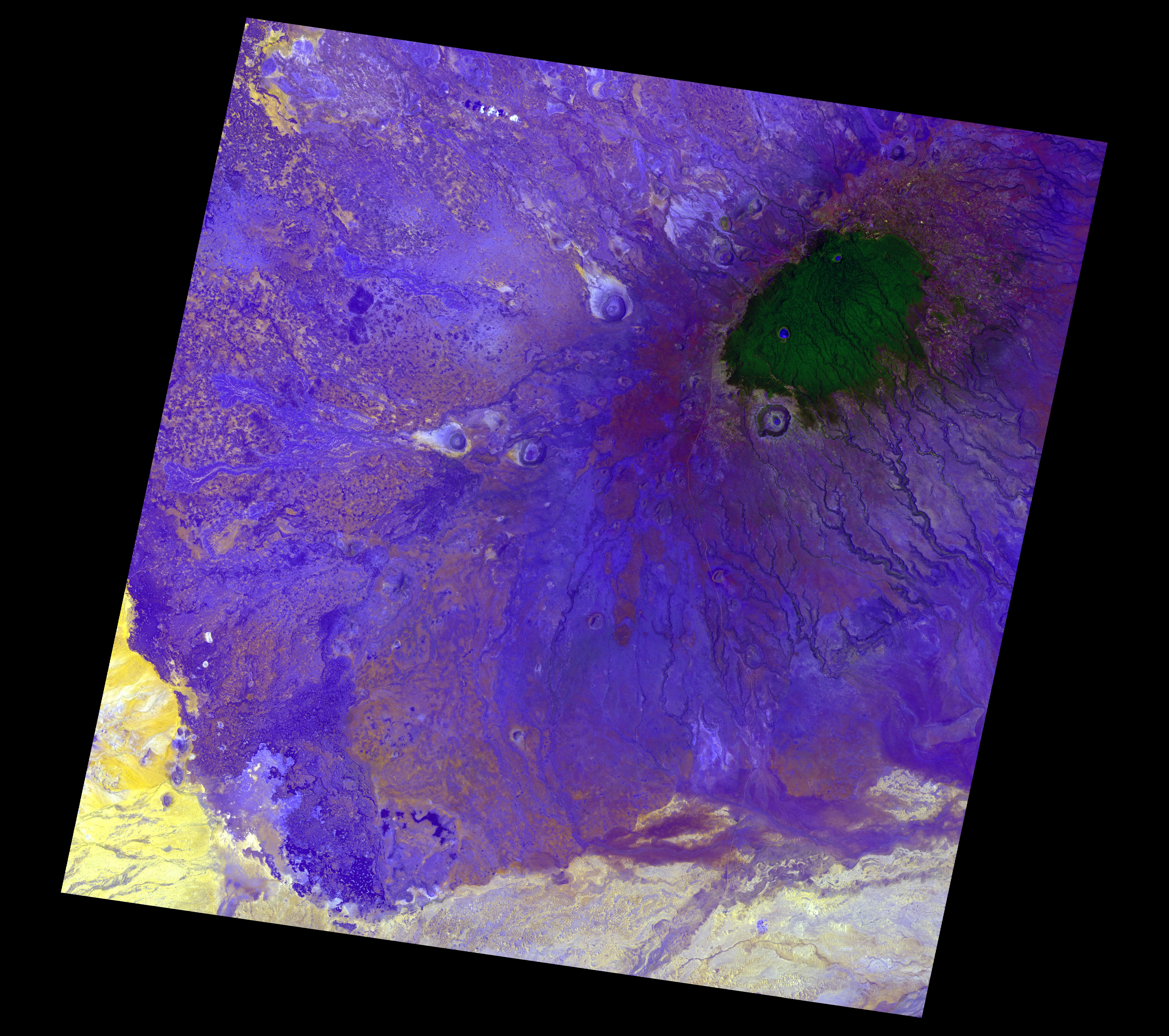
- Satellite image of Marsabit

Highest point
- Elevation: 1,707 m (5,600 ft)
- Coordinates: 2°19′N 37°58′E

Geography
- Location: Eastern Province, Kenya

Geology
- Formed by: Volcanism along the Gregory Rift
- Mountain type: shield volcano
- Last eruption: unknown

Marsabit is a 6300 km^{2} basaltic shield volcano in Kenya, located 170 km east of the center of the East African Rift, in Marsabit County near the town of Marsabit. This was primarily built during the Miocene, but some lava flows and explosive maar-forming eruptions have occurred more recently. At least two of the maars host crater lakes.

The volcano is covered by dense forest. Marsabit National Park is in the area.

It was here, near a body of water they dubbed Lake Paradise, that American explorers Martin and Osa Johnson spent time in the 1920s living and making wildlife documentaries.

On 10 April 2006, a Harbin Y-12 II owned and operated by the Kenyan Air Force crashed in Mount Marsabit killing 14 of the 17 occupants onboard.

== See also ==
- List of volcanoes in Kenya
