= Archers Post =

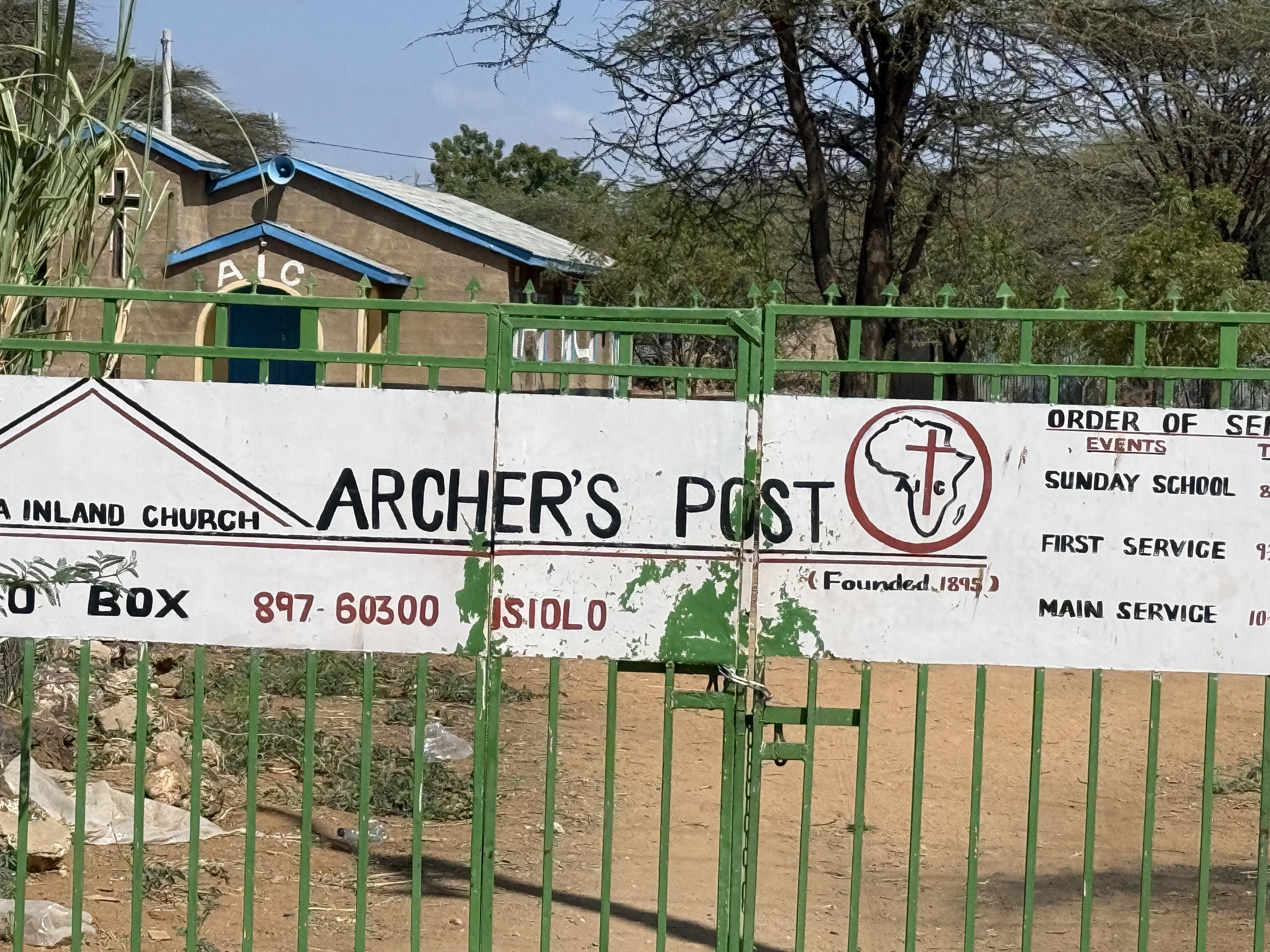

- Location within Kenya
- Coordinates: 0.65°N 37.68°E
- Country: Kenya
- County: Samburu County
- Time zone: UTC+3 (EAT)

Archers Post is a settlement in Kenya's Samburu County, which is home to the Samburu people. Nearby villages include Lerata. The land belongs to the Kenyan government. There is a large military training area to the north east of Archer's Post which is used by the Kenya Defence Forces and the British Army.

== Geography ==
Samburu County is a county in Mid-Western Kenya. It is hot and semi-arid. The town is located on the river bank of the Ewaso Nyiro River. The town also has tourist attraction sites nearby, Samburu National Reserve, Buffalo Springs National Reserve, Shaba National Reserve, Kalama Community Conservancy, West Gate Conservancy and Mount Ololokwe.
