= Marsabit County =

- County
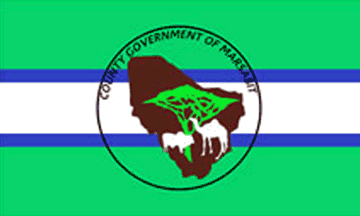
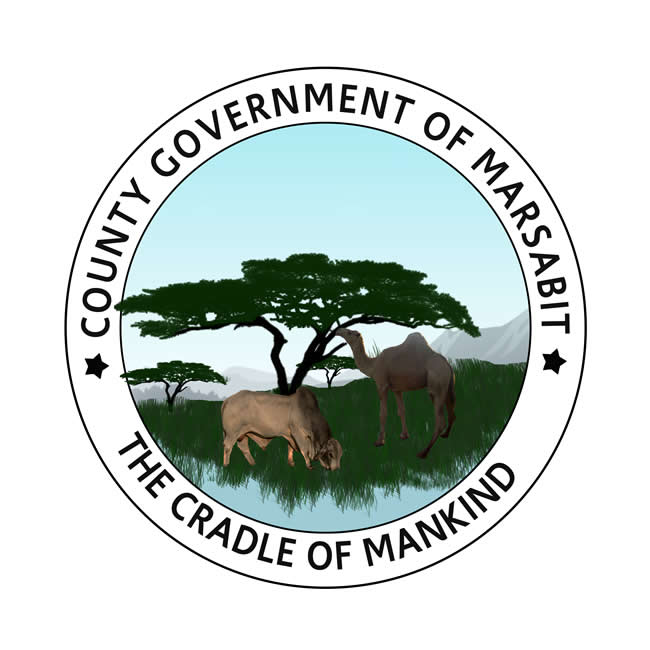
- Flag Coat of arms

- Marsabit County (in red)
- Coordinates: 2°19′N 37°58′E
- Country: Kenya
- Formed: 4 March 2013
- Capital: Marsabit
- Largest town: Moyale
- Other towns: Sololo

Government
  - Governor: Mohammud Ali

Area
  - Total: 66,923.1 km^{2} (25,839.2 sq mi)

Population (2019)
  - Total: 459,785
  - Density: 6.87035/km^{2} (17.7941/sq mi)
- Time zone: UTC+3 (EAT)
- Website: marsabit.go.ke

Marsabit County is a county in Kenya, covering a surface area of 66,923.1 square kilometres. Marsabit is the second largest county by size in Kenya after Turkana county which has an area of 71,597.8 km^{2}. Its capital is Marsabit and its largest town is Moyale. According to the 2019 census, the county had a population of 459,785. It is bordered to the north by Ethiopia, to the west by Turkana County, to the south by Samburu County and Isiolo County, and to the east by Wajir County.

== Geography ==
The county is located in central north Kenya and borders the eastern shore of Lake Turkana. Important topographical features are: Ol Donyo Ranges 2,066 m [6,778 ft] in the southwest, Mount Marsabit 1,865 m [6,119 ft] in the central part of the county, Hurri Hills 1,685 m [5,528 ft] in the northeastern part of the county, Mount Kulal 2,235 m [7,333 ft] in the northwest and the mountains around Sololo-Moyale escarpment up to 1,400 m [4,600 ft] in the northeast. The Chalbi Desert makes up much of the center region of the county.

== Physical and tropical features ==
The county is made of an extensive plain lying 300 and 900 m (980 and 2,950 ft) above sea level which gently slopes towards the south-east. Some of the prominent features include Ol Donyo 2,066 m [6,778 ft] above sea level, Mt. Marsabit 1,865 m [6,119 ft] above sea level, Hurri Hills 1,685 m [5,528 ft] above sea level, Mt. Kulal 2,235 m [7,333 ft] above sea level, and the Sololo-Moyale escarpment up to 1,400 m [4,600 ft] above sea level.

== Climatic conditions ==
The county experiences semi-arid climatic conditions with an average temperature ranging between 15 °C and 26 °C. The rainfall ranges between 200 and 1,000 mm (7.9 and 39.4 in) per annum. The Long rains season starts in April through May while the short rains occur from November to December.

== Demographics ==
The county has a total population of 459,785, of which 243,548 are males, 216,219 females and 18 intersex persons. There are 77,495 households, with an average household size of 5.8 persons per household and a population density of 6 people per square kilometre.

Population

Historical population
Year	Pop.	±%
1979	96,216	—
1989	129,262	+34.3%
1999	174,957	+35.4%
2009	291,166	+66.4%
2019	459,785	+57.9%

Urban Centre	2019 Population
Moyale	37,387
Marsabit	14,907
Sololo	9,104
Loiyangalani	5,117
Laisamis	2,643

=== Religion ===
Religion in Marsabit County
1. Islam (48.5%)
2. Christianity (35.0%)
3. African Traditional Religion (15.5%)
4. Other Religions (including Atheism) (1.00%)

== Administrative and political units ==
=== Administrative units ===
There are 4 sub counties, 16 divisions, 63 locations and 127 sub-locations.

==== Sub-counties ====
- Saku
- North Horr
- Laisamis
- Moyale

==== Electoral constituencies ====
There 4 constituencies and 20 county assembly wards.

- Moyale Constituency
- North Horr Constituency
- Saku Constituency
- Laisamis Constituency

=== Political leadership ===
Mohamed Mohamud Ali is the Governor and was elected in 2017 and his deputy is Solomon Gubo Riwe. He replaced Ukur Yattani, the first governor of Marsabit county and was the Cabinet Secretary of National Treasury & Planning. Said Mohammed Chute is the Senator and has been senator since 2022. Nasra Ibrahim Ibren is the first elected women representative and was replaced in 2017 general elections by Safia Sheikh Adan.

For Marsabit County, the County Executive Committee comprises:-

County Executive Committee
	Number
The Governor	1
The Deputy Governor	1
The County Secretary	1
The CEC Members	10
Total	13

==== Members of Parliament 2017-2022 (Marsabit County) ====
1. Hon. Wario, Qalicha Gufu of Jubilee Party (JP), Member of Parliament for Moyale Constituency.
2. Hon. Ganya, Francis Chachu of FAP Party, Member of Parliament for North Horr Constituency.
3. Hon. Raso, Dido Ali of Jubilee Party (JP), Member of Parliament for Saku Constituency.
4. Hon. Arbelle, Marselino of Jubilee Party (JP), Malimo Member of Parliament for Laisamis Constituency.

== Education ==
There are 278 ECD centres, 209 primary schools and 31 secondary schools. The county has also a teachers' training college, 4 youth polytechnics, 106 adult training institutions and 6 technical training institutions. The number of teachers currently providing basic education in Marsabit county is 1,912, consisting of 492 ECDE teachers, 1,147 primary and 283 secondary school teachers.

== Health and disability ==
There is a total of 111 health facilities, hospital beds in the county. The county has 457 health personnel of different cadres.

HIV prevalence is at 1%, below the national 5.3% (Kenya HIV Estimates 2011).

In Turbi, a local disability group operates a cooperative for farming development supported by the international charity Oxfam.

== Transport and communication ==
The county is covered by 5,000 km (3,100 mi) of road network. Of this, 4,108 km (2,553 mi) is covered by earth surface, 580 km (360 mi) is murram surface, and 312 km (194 mi) of surface is covered by bitumen.

There are two post offices with 1,000 installed letter boxes: 717 rented letter boxes and 283 vacant letter boxes.

== Electoral constituencies ==
Constituencies of Marsabit County
Map	Constituency Name	Constituency No.	Approximate Population (2009)	Area in km^{2}
	Moyale	45	145,196	9,390
	North Horr	46	109,179	38,953
	Saku	47	46,502	2,078
	Laisamis	48	65,669	20,266
		Total	291,166	70,687

=== Administrative sub-divisions ===
Administratively, the county is divided into four administrative sub-counties namely: Marsabit Central, Laisamis, North Horr, and Moyale. Sub-counties are further divided into 20 wards and administrative villages.
