= Law enforcement in Kenya =

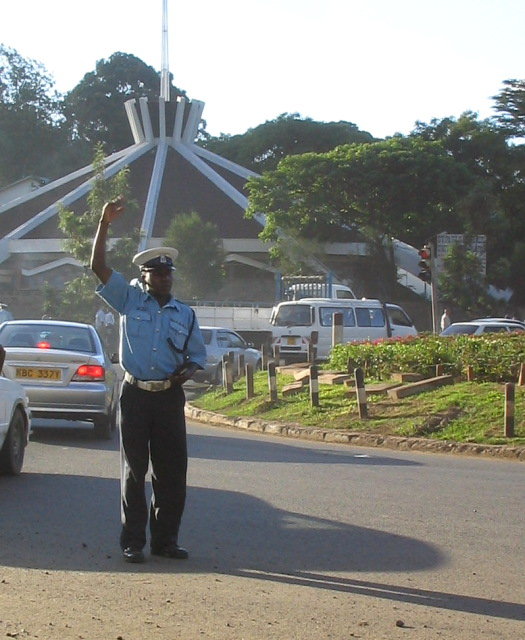
Kenyan policeman in Nairobi

Kenya's National Police Service (NPS) is the umbrella law enforcement organ in Kenya. The service was established in 2011 under Article 243 of the Constitution of Kenya, following dissolution of Kenya Police Force and Administration Police Force.

The NPS is under the overall and independent command of the inspector-general, who is appointed by the president and approved by Parliament. The National Police Service in Kenya employs up to 100,000 police officers and paramilitary personnel.

== Composition of the National Police Service ==
The National Police Service in Kenya is composed of:

(1) The Kenya Police Service was previously referred as Kenya Police Force but was reestablished under Article 243 (2) (a) of the Constitution of Kenya.

(2) The Administration Police Service was known as Administration Police Force and was recreated under Article 243 (2) (b) of the Constitution of Kenya.

(3) The Directorate of Criminal Investigations was famously called CID for Criminal Investigations Department and was created Section 28 of the National Police Service Act, 2011.

(4) The Internal Affairs Unit is a new unit born through Section of the 87 (9),(10) of the National Police Service Act, above.

=== Kenya Police Service ===
The Kenya Police Service (KPS) is the primary security and law enforcement agency in Kenya. It is commanded by Deputy Inspector-General (DIG) who reports to the Inspector-General of the National Police Service, fields about 65,000 officers. The General Service Unit (GSU) is a paramilitary wing of KPS and has around 10,000 personnel.

This regular police service is backed up in arid and semi arid rural areas by the Kenya Police Reserve (KPR).

=== Administration Police Service ===
The Administration Police (AP) 25,000 strong, report to the Deputy Inspector General- APS. The AP started out as the native police who reported to the local village headman. In 1929 this was formalised by the Tribal Police Ordinance which also provided for their training under the oversight of the regional agents. Just like the Kenya Police Service, it is led by a Deputy Inspector General. Today the Administration Police is tasked with protective and border security as well as combating cattle theft and containing banditry.

=== Directorate of Criminal Investigations ===
Directorate of Criminal Investigation is a semi-autonomous directorate of the National Police Service responsible for investigating complex cases. It is commonly referred to by the initials CID. It is headed by a director who reports to the Inspector General of Police. Due to the sensitivity of the position, the director of the CID is appointed by the president of Kenya. The current director is Amin Mohamed Ibrahim, who was appointed by President William ruto on 15 October 2022 to replace George Kinoti who resigned. Before his appointment he was previously the national police spokesman based in the office of the Inspector General of Police. The CID headquarters are located on Kiambu Road, Nairobi.

=== General Service Unit ===
The General Service Unit (GSU) initially known as the Kenya Police Emergency Company, was established by the colonial government to battle Mau Mau freedom fighters (rebels) during the fight for Kenya's independence. It now has around 11,000 paramilitary of which 2,000 are trained by Israelis (Recce group) that forms most of the Presidential guard, VVIP and Diplomatic protection.

== Departmental Agencies ==
=== Kenya Prisons Service ===
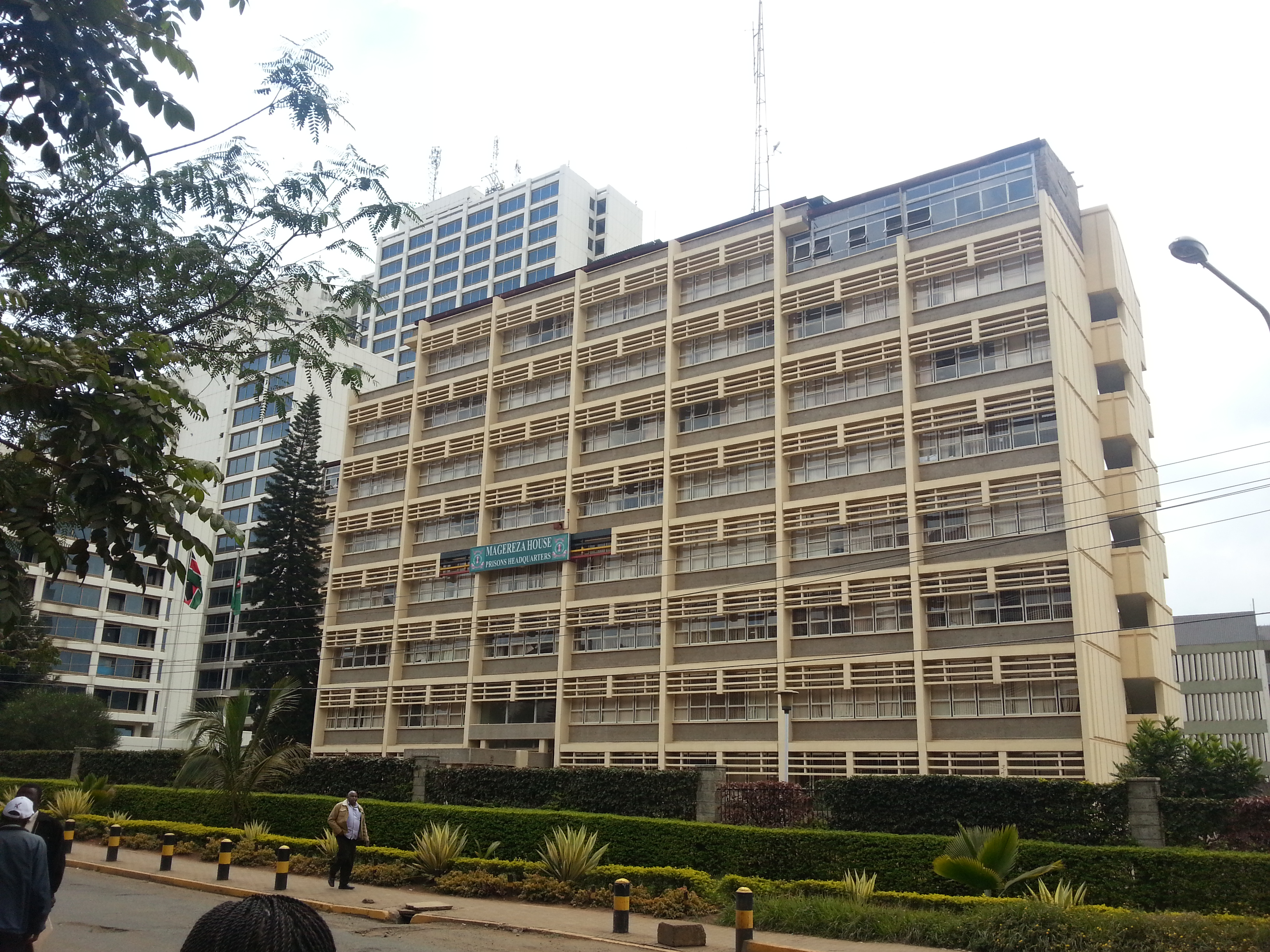
Kenya Prisons Headquarters, Magereza House, Nairobi

Kenya Prisons Service (KPS) is a department within the Ministry of Interior and Coordination of National Government. KPS is established under the Prisons Act Cap 90 and Borstal Institutions Act Cap 92 Laws of Kenya. It is a uniformed disciplined service, headed by the Commissioner General of Prisons (CGP).

Kenya Prisons Service contributes to public safety and security by ensuring there is safe custody of all persons who are lawfully committed to its 129 prison facilities, among them Kamiti Maximum Security Prison. It also facilitates the rehabilitation of custodially sentenced offenders for community reintegration.

The current prisoners' population stands at 54,000 of whom 48% are pre-trial detainees whilst the remaining ones are sentenced prisoners. The staff establishment stands at approximately 22,000, consisting of uniformed officers.

=== Kenya Wildlife Service ===
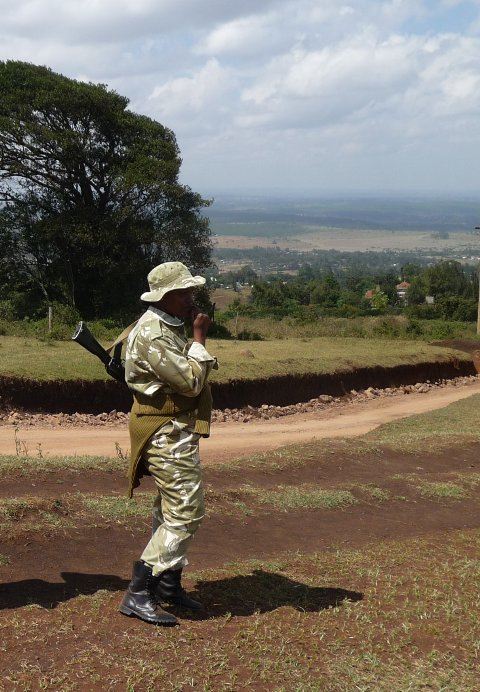
KWS ranger

Kenya Wildlife Service is a state corporation, with a paramilitary wing, is responsible for wildlife conservation and wildlife protection. It consists of the trap unit, air wing unit, anti-poaching unit, scout unit, wildlife intelligence unit, wildlife protection unit and of late dog unit. It is headed by the Director of the Kenya Wildlife Service. During Richard Leakey's tenure as director in the early 1990s poaching was almost eliminated, but gradually enforcement relaxed and poaching again became a problem with significant killings of endangered species beginning about 2001, especially affected were the black rhinos.

=== Kenya Forest Service ===
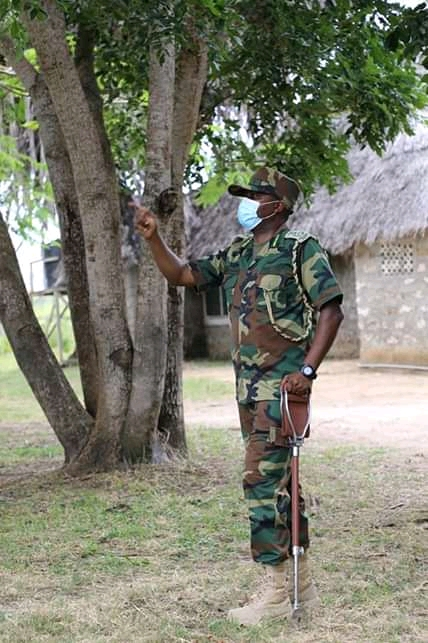
Chief Conservator, KFS

Kenya Forest Service (KFS) is a state corporation established under Forest Conservation and Management Act 2016. The Service has a uniformed and Disciplined Cadre that is charged with the responsibility of protecting the forests and provision of security to personnel and installations. There is the department of investigation, prosecution and revenue inspection, department of Forest security intelligence, and Field Operations. The Forest Law Enforcement Officers are trained in Forest Law Enforcement Academy. Some of the duties of the Service is to protect the forest through arrest and prosecution of Forest offenders, carry out investigation and intelligence operations in the forest to eliminate threats inside the forest. The Service also:

- Promote forestry education and training and operate the Kenya Forestry College
- Enforce the conditions and regulations pertaining to logging, charcoal making and other forest utilisation activities

Apprehend and prosecute violators of forest law and regulations

- Collect revenues from exploitation of forest products

=== National Youth Service ===
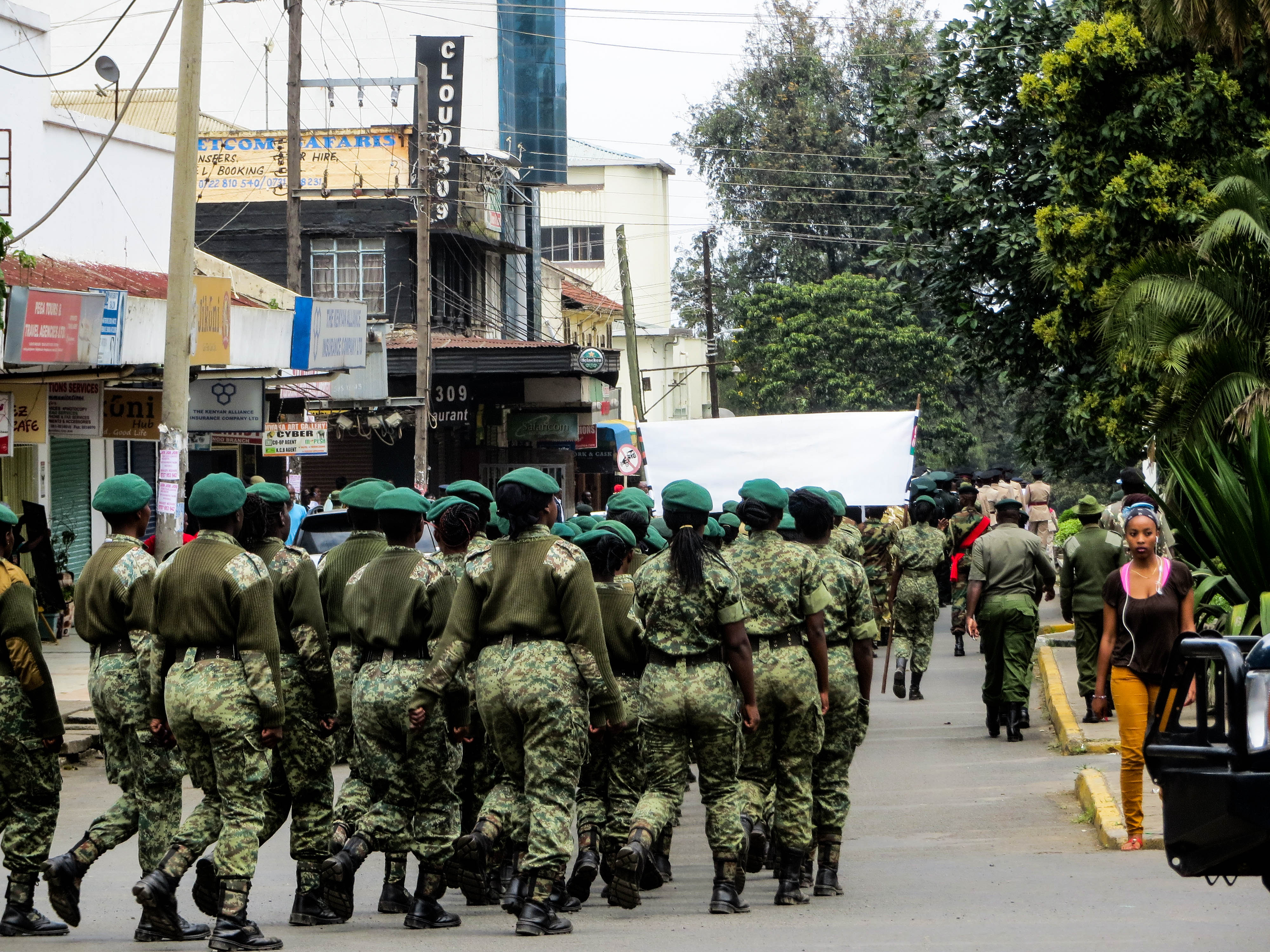
National Youth Service marching on street in Nakuru

National Youth Service (NYS) is an organisation under the National Government of Kenya. It was established in 1964 to train young people in important national matters. In 2019, the organization was transformed from a state department to a fully fledged semi-autonomous state corporation after enactment of NYS act, 2018 by the Kenyan parliament.

The National Youth Service, which is administered by the Office of the President, provides some paramilitary training to young job trainees. These young people provide national service to the country. They are later enrolled for technical and vocational training. They also form a cadre of Kenya military reserves.

=== County Enforcement Agencies ===
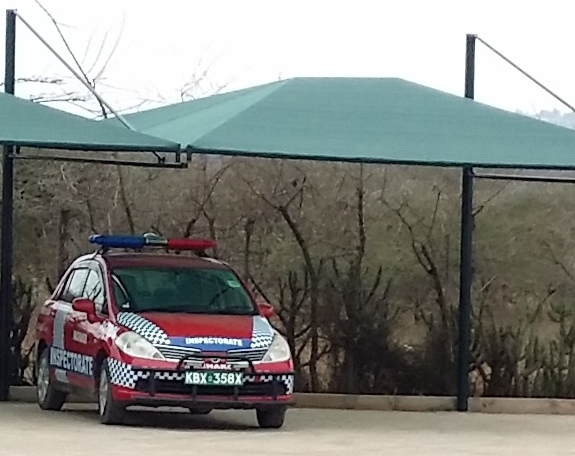
Machakos County Inspectorate Vehicle

County enforcement departments are based on each of the 47 county governments. They are established under The County Law Compliance and Enforcement Bill, 2018. These inspectorates enforce and ensure compliance of county laws and other relevant laws, provide security services to County properties, VIP protection and installations and investigate crimes related to the county. They also manage the prosecutorial process in line with county legislation, carry out environmental supervision over the management of waste disposal. Besides their core mandates of enforcing compliance by managing county regulations and bylaws, Inspectorates also offer secondary support to services that are primarily the preserve Theof national government e.g. county traffic control and security. The officers of the department are trained to be friendly to the people they serve, also to take charge of security operations in the county by efficiently and effectively responding to emergencies.

== National Intelligence Service ==
National Intelligence Service (Kenya) (NIS) was previously known as the National Security Intelligence Service (NSIS) which had its origins in "Special Branch" a department of the national police that was created in 1952 under the British administration. Among other things it provided intelligence during the Mau Mau Uprising. In 1963 with independence approaching Special Branch was made independent from the police and in 1969 it was given a new charter. It wasn't until 1986 that it was transformed into the Directorate of Security Intelligence (DSI).

In 1998, a new act of Parliament in Kenya established the National Security Intelligence Service (NSIS) to replace the former Directorate of Security Intelligence which at the time was still colloquially known as "Special Branch". The first director general (DG) of the new service was retired Brigadier Wilson A.C. Boinett who served until 2006, when he was replaced with Major-General Michael Gichangi. In January 2011 Gichangi was appointed to a second five-year term.

NSIS's intelligence gathering work includes: internal, external and strategic intelligence. The NSIS is charged with identifying conditions that threaten Kenya's political, economic and social stability. It develops techniques and strategies to neutralise such threats. The NSIS director is the national security advisor to the president of Kenya.

The NSIS was relocated from the notorious offices of Special Branch at Nyati House to new headquarters on the outskirts of the city, near the Windsor Golf and Country Hotel. In April 1999, the Moi government appointed Mrs Pamela Mboya, the former Permanent representative to the Habitat, to head a Committee that was charged with formulating a scheme of service for NSIS officers.

Security of tenure given the director general of NSIS is designed to protect him from such abuse by members of the governing elite. He has the opportunity to say 'no' to any unlawful or sectarian instructions from his bosses without fear of losing his job.

NSIS is divided into seven sections:

1. Administration under the director of administration,
2. Information technology under the director of information technology
3. Internal intelligence under the director of internal intelligence
4. External intelligence under the director of external intelligence
5. Analysis & production under the director of economic affairs
6. Operations under the director of operations
7. National Intelligence Academy under its own director

== See also ==
- Kenya Defence Forces
- Kenya Coast Guard Service
- Corruption in Kenya
- Crime in Kenya
