= Kenya Police Reserve =

The Kenya Police Reserve (KPR) was formed in 1948 to assist the regular Kenya Police in the maintenance of law and order. The KPR exists in rural areas of Kenya as an auxiliary force to combat cattle theft and armed banditry. The KPR is not to be confused with the Kikuyu Home Guard.

== Antecedents to the KPR ==
In 1943, the Kenya Legislative Council passed a National Service Act that made conscription compulsory for European residents of Kenya. This was amended in 1944 with the Auxiliary Police Ordinance, which made provision for conscripts to fulfill their national service in the Auxiliary police, supporting the regular Kenya Police. (The Kenya Police were at this time under pressure from war-time commitments). The Auxiliary Police regulations lasted from January 1945 until February 1947, after which they were repealed. It was found, however, that the Kenya Police were still short of personnel, and in February 1947 it was agreed that 255 former Auxiliary Police would be retained on a voluntary basis, but would be known as Special Police, their basis in law being section 70 of the Kenya Police Ordinance which made provision for what in the UK would be called special constabulary. In 1948 a new Kenya Police Ordinance was brought into law, section 57 of which makes provision for the Special Police.

== Establishment of the KPR in 1948 ==
In early 1948 the Kenya Police Reserve Ordinance was passed to establish the Kenya Police Reserve. It too was set up on the lines of the UK special constabulary, with a command structure in parallel to that of the regular force. Uniforms and scales of equipment were identical to that of the regular force, although the KPR wore brass badges rather than the chrome badges of the regular force. KPR members were armed, and in remote areas were allowed to keep their weapons at home; but they were not issued with automatic weapons (this provision was lifted during the Mau Mau uprising). The KPR was open to Europeans, Asians and Africans, although Europeans were favoured with automatic promotion to Inspector rank.

The Special Police did not disband, but remained in operation alongside the KPR. In March 1953 the Special Police were expanded dramatically when Africans were allowed to join; some 2000 did so, and served with distinction. They did not receive the full uniform of the police and used improvised weapons at first. Eventually the Special Police were issued rifles, as the reliability and efficiency of the SP was demonstrated.

The KPR were the originators of the Kenya Police Reserve Air Wing, with KPR members donating the use of their private aircraft. They played a vital role in supplying aerial intelligence and air-dropped supplies to forces fighting the Mau Mau.

== Recent developments ==
In post colonial Kenya the KPR carried on very much as when it was originated. In rural areas of Kenya, very often the KPR are the only police presence. Armed with obsolete rifles, they are the first line of defence against bandits and cattle thieves. Many of those involved in cattle theft in rural Kenya carry firearms smuggled from neighboring countries such as Somalia or South Sudan.

In May 2004 the Kenya Government disbanded the KPR in urban areas, noting that the various city units had become corrupt and unmanageable.

In May 2019 the Inspector General disarmed the KPR in north rift counties, citing reports of reservists misusing their weapons. In June 2019, the Kenyan government selected 40 KPR personnel to undergo training at the National Police College Magadi. These retrained reservists were later deployed at volatile counties, where they had been withdrawn a month earlier, to beef up security.

In March 2022, the Kenyan government rearmed the KPR in rural areas under pressure from civilians, mostly in Baringo North and South constituencies, who complained that the reservists had been vital in combating criminal activity. The KPR was to receive weapons and training from the General Service Unit.
