= Wilson Boinett =

Kenyan military and intelligence officer

Brigadier (Rtd) Wilson Boinett

Director General of the National Security Intelligence Service (NSIS)
- In office January 1999 – January 2006
- Preceded by: Inaugural
- Succeeded by: Major-General Michael Gichangi

Head of the Directorate of Security Intelligence of Kenya
- In office 1995–1998
- President: Daniel Moi
- Preceded by: William Kivuvani
- Succeeded by: Defunct

Personal details
- Born: 1952 (age 73–74) Timboroa, Kenya
- Education: National Defense University (United States)
- Website: www.brigadierboinettfoundation.org

Military service
- Allegiance: Kenya
- Branch/service: Kenya Army
- Years of service: 1972–1995
- Rank: Brigadier

Wilson Ayabei Chemno Boinett (born 1952) is a retired Kenyan brigadier who served as the inaugural director general of the National Security Intelligence Service (NSIS), currently the National Intelligence Service. Under his tenure, the restructuring and modernization of the Kenyan intelligence service from the Directorate of Security Intelligence (DSI) to the National Security Intelligence Service, following the passing of the National Security Intelligence Service Act of 1998, took place.

== Early life and education ==
Boinett was born in Timboroa. He studied at the University of Nairobi and the National Defense University in the United States.

== Career ==
Military career

Boinett joined the Kenyan military as a cadet in 1972.

In 1979, he was appointed officer commanding of the Kenya contingent involved in the Rhodesia election process. In 1981, he served as military advisor to the Organisation of African Unity special envoy to the peace process in Chad. In 1982, he was appointed aide de camp to President Daniel Arap Moi.

In 1994, Boinett was part of Kenya's contingent to the United Nations Verification Team in Mozambique. He later served as director of Military Intelligence.

National intelligence career

In 1995, Boinett was appointed head of the Directorate of Security Intelligence, which at the time was Kenya's primary intelligence agency. He served in this position until 1998. In December 1998, parliament passed the National Security Intelligence Service Act, which came into force in January 1999 and restructured Kenya's intelligence system. The legislation separated intelligence functions from the Kenya Police Force and established the National Security Intelligence Service (NSIS) as an independent civilian agency.

Boinett was appointed as the director general of NSIS on 19 January 1999. He oversaw the transition from the Directorate of Security Intelligence to the new service.

Boinett served a five-year term and was reappointed for two more years in January 2004. He left office in January 2006 and was succeeded by Major General Michael Gichangi.

Reforms and counterterrorism efforts

During his tenure, Boinett transformed the intelligence service into a civilian-focused institution. The new structure replaced the former Directorate of Security Intelligence, which had been associated with political repression and human rights abuses. The reformed service focused on intelligence gathering and analysis rather than law enforcement, and its officers no longer held arrest powers. Laws were implemented to strengthen accountability and oversight within the intelligence sector. He emphasized professional standards, training and respect for human rights. The service also increased its use of technology and improved its analytical capacity.

Boinett was intentional about changing the internal culture and public image of the intelligence service. Professionalism, openness, and public trust were promoted.

Boinett also played a role in strengthening Kenya's counterterrorism framework, especially after the 1998 US embassy bombing in Nairobi. During his tenure, the National Counter Terrorism Centre was established to improve coordination and information sharing among security agencies, highlighting the importance of regional cooperation alongside collaboration with international partners in addressing security threats.

Notably, in the leadup to the 2002 general elections that led to an end of president Moi's 24 year rule, Boinett provided critical intelligence to the president about the high likelihood that the opposition was set to win against the Kenya African National Union candidate, Uhuru Kenyatta, who was the president's preferred successor. He also played a key role in ensuring the transition happened after Mwai Kibaki of the National Rainbow Coalition was declared the president-elect.

== Publications ==
- Boinett, Wilson. 2009. The Origins of the Intelligence System of Kenya. In Changing Intelligence Dynamics in Africa, edited by Sandy Africa and Johnny Kwadjo, pages 15 to 40. Birmingham: GFN SSR and ASSN.
- Boinett, Wilson A. C. 2025. Fixing Spy Craft to Serve National Interests in Kenya: From the Colonial Special Branch to a Civilian National Intelligence Service.

== Awards and decorations ==
Boinett was inducted into the National Defense University, United States, International Fellows Hall of Fame in 2005.

== See also ==
- Law enforcement in Kenya
- National Intelligence Service (Kenya)
