= Kenya Coast Guard Service =

Coordinates: 04°04′10″S 39°39′27″E

- Racing stripe
- Abbreviation: KCGS

Agency overview
- Formed: November 19, 2018

Jurisdictional structure
- Operations jurisdiction: Kenya
- Constituting instrument: Kenya Coast Guard Service Act, 2018
- Specialist jurisdiction: Coastal patrol, marine border protection, marine search and rescue

Operational structure
- Overseen by: Coast Guard Service Council
- Headquarters: Mombasa
- Agency executive: Bruno Isohi Shioso OGW, Director general
- Parent agency: Ministry of Interior and National Administration

Website
- kcgs.go.ke

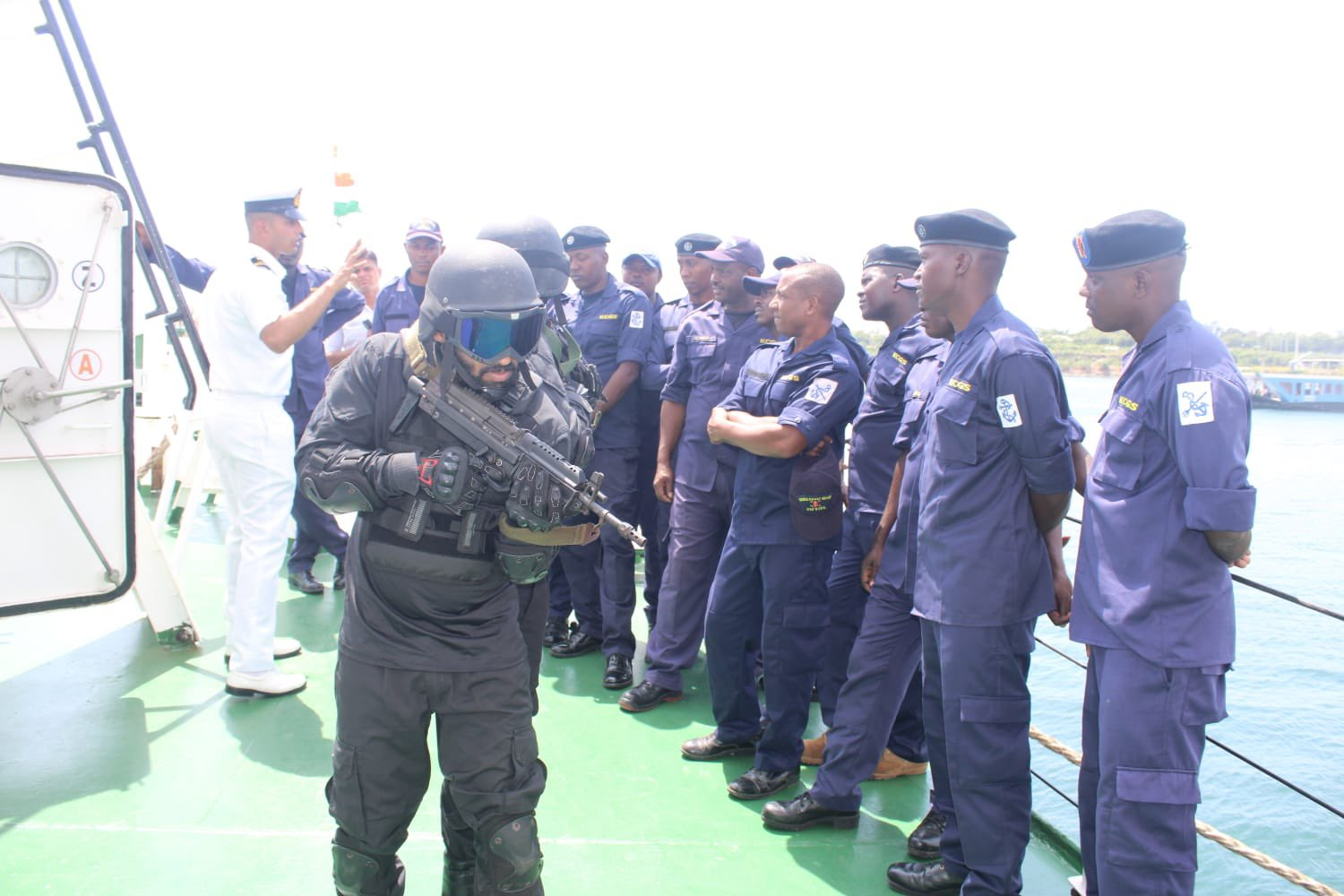
Members of the Kenya Coast Guard Service onboard Indian Coast Guard ship Varaha in the Port of Mombasa

The Kenya Coast Guard Service is a specialized maritime force of the Republic of Kenya, responsible for law enforcement on national waters, including on lakes and rivers, as well as in the Indian Ocean. The force is mandated to maintain maritime safety, security, pollution control and sanitation. It is also responsible for apprehending and prosecuting offenders.

== Headquarters ==
The headquarters of the agency are located in the Liwatoni neighbourhood, in the port city of Mombasa, on the north-eastern bank of Kilindini Harbour. The approximate geographical data of the headquarters of the Kenya Coast Guard Services are: 04°04'10.0"S, 39°39'27.0"E (Latitude:-4.069444, Longitude:39.657500). The agency has representation in all major ocean ports in the country, including Kilifi, Malindi and Lamu. It is also present on Lake Turkana and in the lake port of Kisumu, on the shores of Lake Victoria.

== Overview ==
The agency consists of professional security personnel drawn from the Kenya Defence Forces, the National Police Service, the National Intelligence Service and civilian professionals. On 19 November 2018, President Uhuru Kenyatta appointed Brigadier Vincent Naisho Loonena, a 20-year veteran of the Kenya Navy, as the first Director General of the government agency. The director-general has responsibility for the day-to-day management of the agency and the administration of discipline.

The coast guard is responsible for patrolling Kenya's territorial waters, preventing unlawful fishing, piracy, human and drug trafficking, smuggling and prevention of environmental damage. It is hoped that the coast guard will reduce cross-border crime and increase the country's intelligence gathering and information sharing ability.

== History ==
In 2016, the Business Daily Africa reported that Kenya lost an estimated KSh. 10 billion (US$100 million) in revenue, annually, due to illegal fishing alone.

Partly to mitigate this loss, the Parliament of Kenya adopted the Coast Guard Act 2018, which established the Kenya Coast Guard Service. The law was operationalized on 22 October 2018, when Kenya's Interior Minister gazetted the parliamentary act.

== Governance ==
The coast guard is entirely separate from the Kenyan Navy. The agency is supervised by the Coast Guard Service Council, chaired by the Cabinet Secretary for Internal Affairs. Other council members include the cabinet secretaries for Defence, Environment and Forestry, Transport and Infrastructure, and Housing and Urban Development. Other members include the Chief of the Kenya Defence Forces, the Inspector General of the Kenya National Police Service, representative of the Ministry of Transport, representative of the Ministry of Fisheries and others that may be added at a later date. Jane's Defence Weekly, on the other hand, reported that the vessel was delivered to the Kenyan Ministry of Fisheries, Livestock and Agriculture.

The first-ever Director General of the KCGS is Brigadier Vincent Naisho Loonena, a senior officer of the Kenya Navy, with more than 20 years experience.

== Equipment ==
A new marine vessel, the coast guard's first, was procured in 2017 at a cost of KSh. 3.6 billion. This vessel, the 54-metre (177 ft) offshore patrol vessel MV Doria, was commissioned on 19 November 2018. The Doria has been described as the mother ship around which the coast guard fleet will be built. MV Doria was built by Western Marine Shipyard of Bangladesh and delivered to the Kenya Ministry of Ministry of Fisheries, Livestock and Agriculture in August 2017. Until more vessels are built the coast guard will rely heavily on assistance from the Kenyan Navy.

== See also ==
- Kenya Police
- Law enforcement in Kenya
