= Racing stripe =

Design element used on race cars

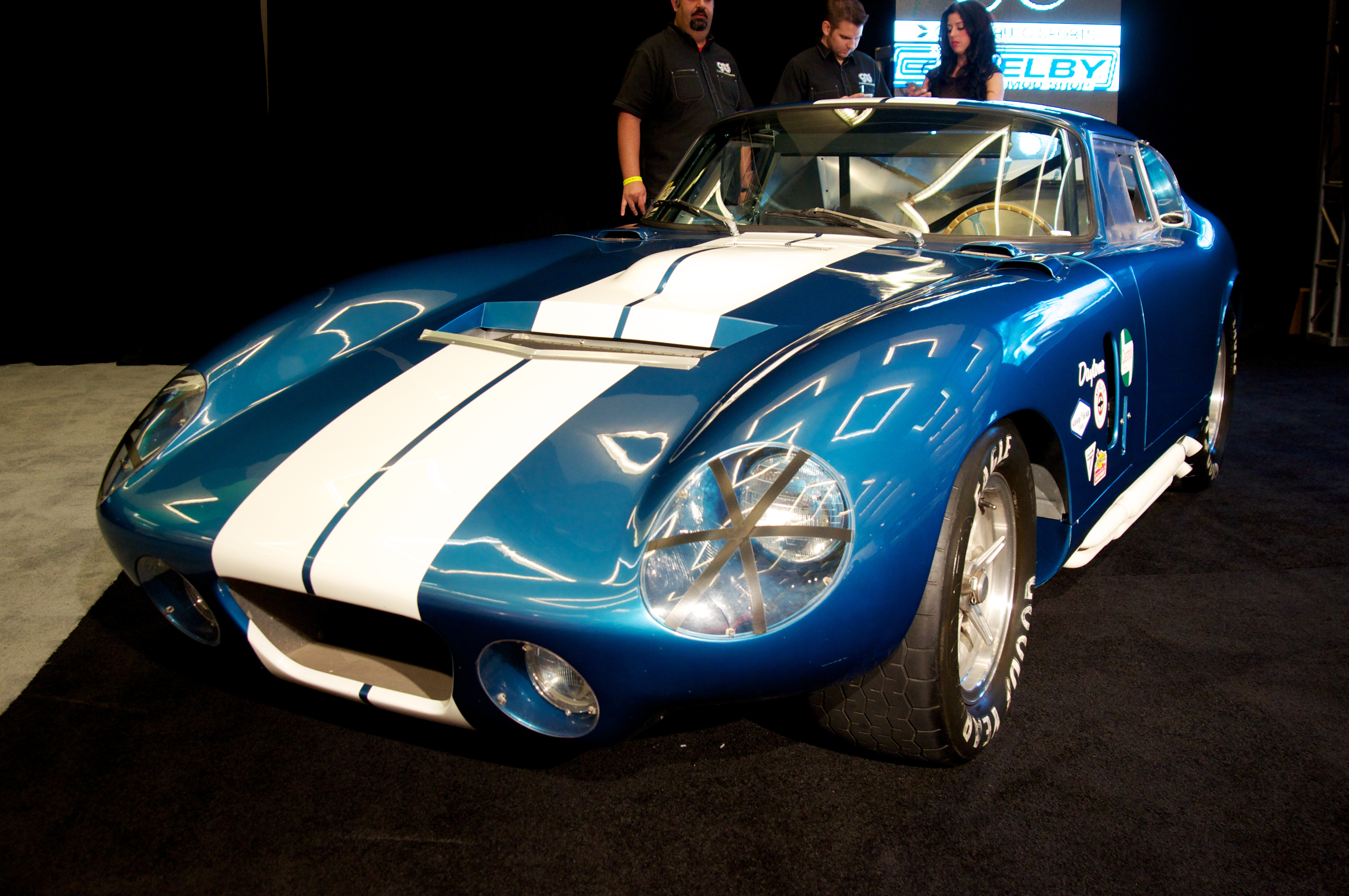
1964 Shelby Daytona Coupe

Racing stripes, also called Le Mans stripes or rally stripes, were originally applied to race cars to help identify them in the field during races. The term "racing stripe" is also used to refer to diagonal lines painted on watercraft hulls, usually on vessels belonging to a country's coast guard.

== Racing cars ==
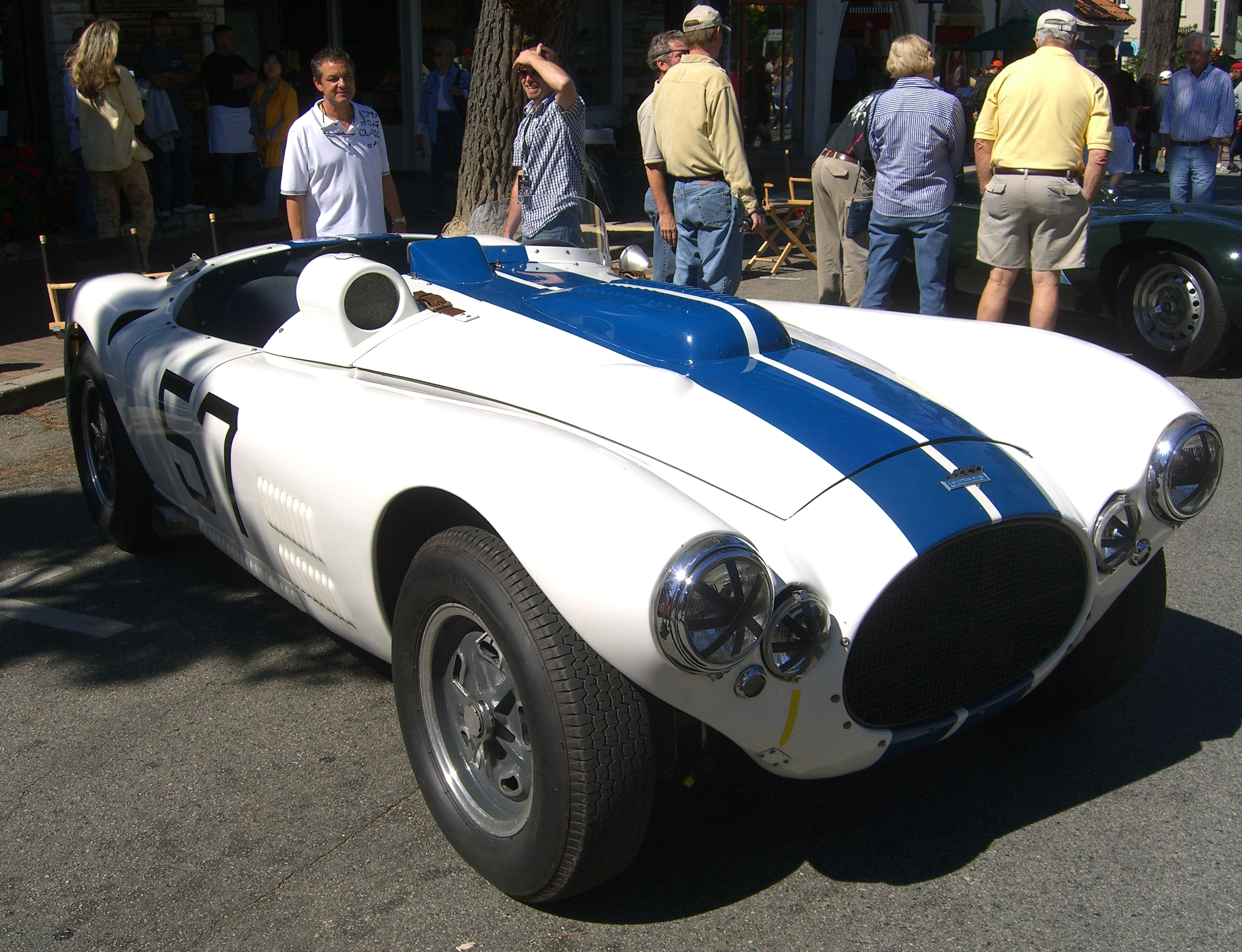
1952 Cunningham C-4R

Racing stripes were applied to the Cunningham team's race cars beginning in 1951. Usually two parallel blue stripes running from front to rear in the centre of the white body, they helped spectators identify the cars during races. These evolved from the traditional FIA-registered American racing colours of a white body and blue chassis, which dated from when racing cars had the chassis exposed. The two blue stripes were a symbolic echo of the chassis colours.

In 1964, the Shelby Daytona Coupe would use the converse blue with white stripes and would compete in the 1964 and 1965 24 Hours of Le Mans.

== Road cars ==
The first road car to implement racing stripes was the 1965 Ford Mustang GT350. From the 1960s, stripes have sometimes been applied to road cars as well as racing cars. Such cars as the Renault 8 Gordini had stripes fitted as standard. They are sometimes referred to as "go-faster stripes" on road cars.

An alternative style features stripes which wrap around the car sideways instead of running down the center of the vehicle, called "bumblebee stripes". These stripes were featured prominently on the Dodge Charger Daytona race car. Dodge's "Scat Pack" performance package for 1968-1971 muscle cars featured the bumblebee stripe as a signature.

In 1996, a pair of 8-inch wide stripes were used on the Dodge Viper GTS, starting a revival of the fashion. Since then, they have often been referred to as "Viper Stripes".

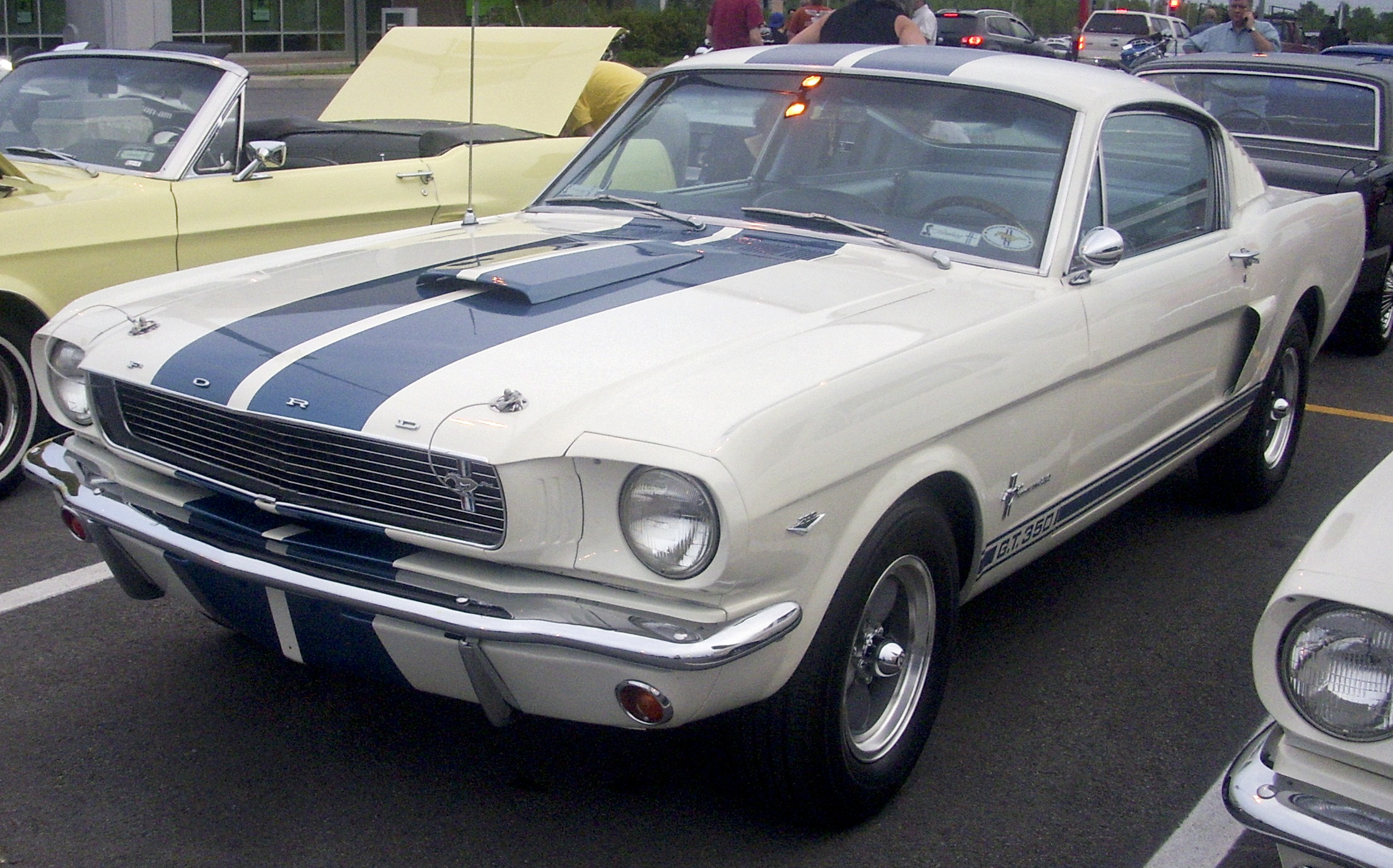
1965 Mustang GT350, the first road car to feature racing stripes

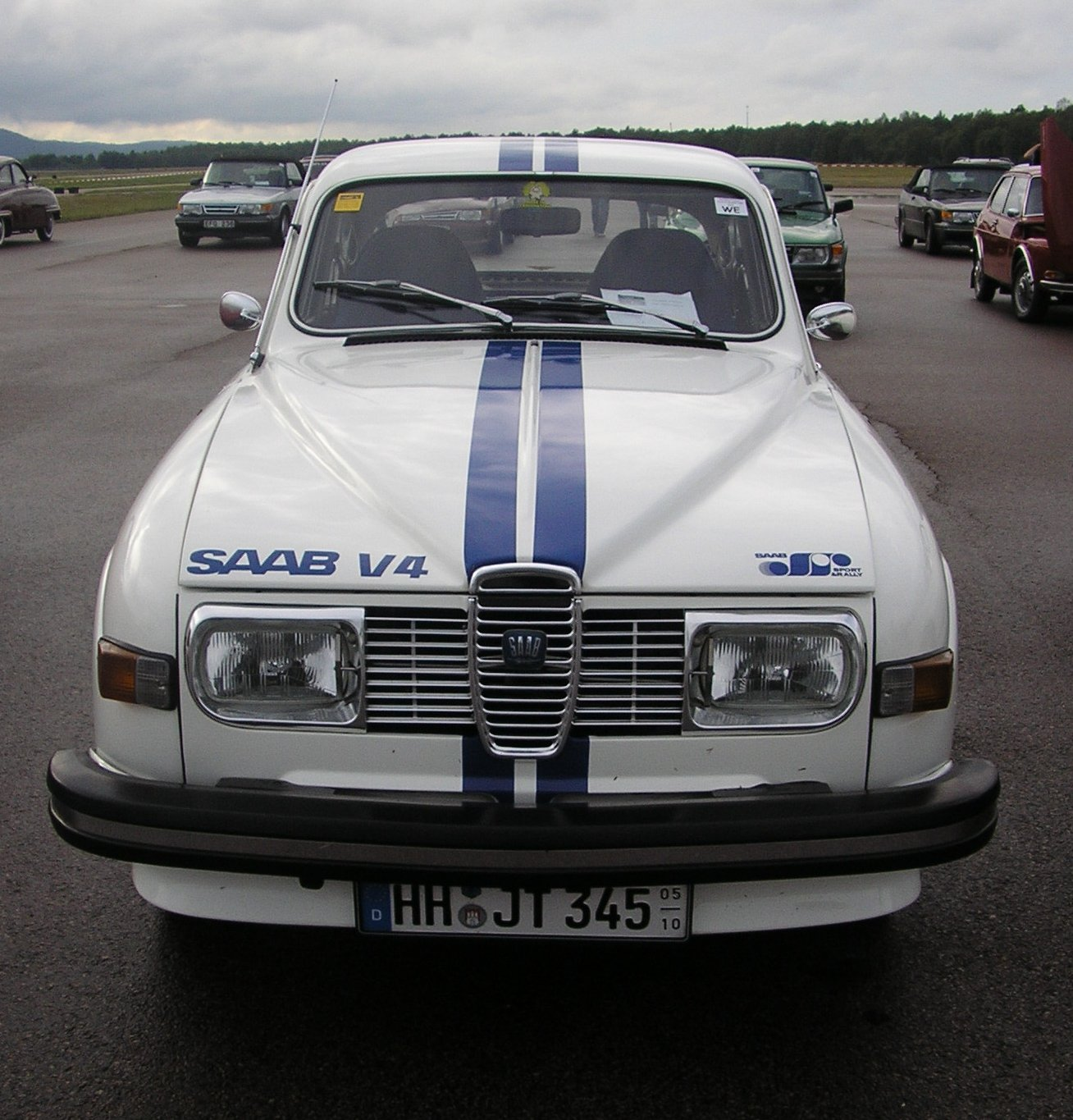
Saab 96 with "go-faster stripes"

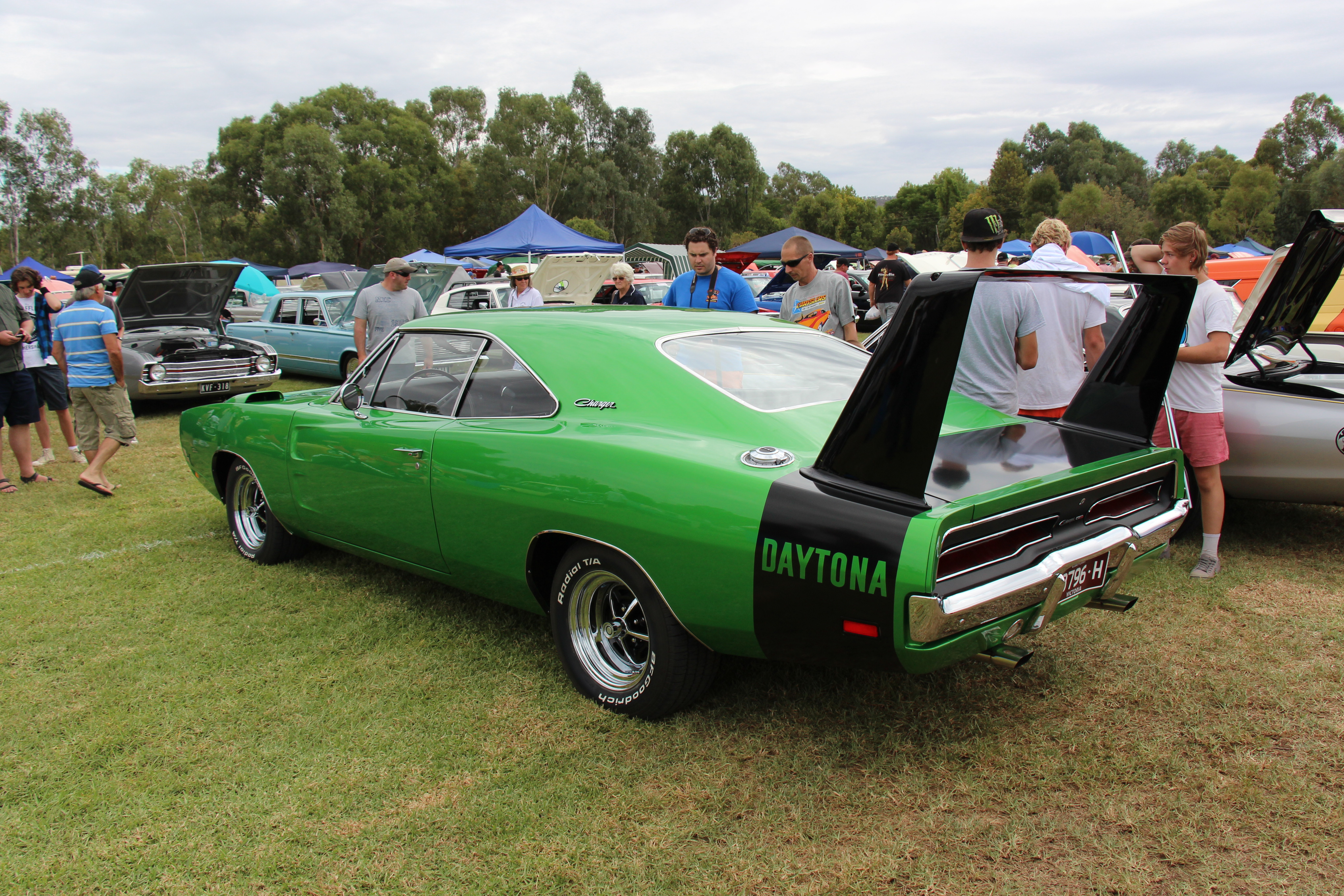
1969 Dodge Charger Daytona with a "bumblebee stripe"

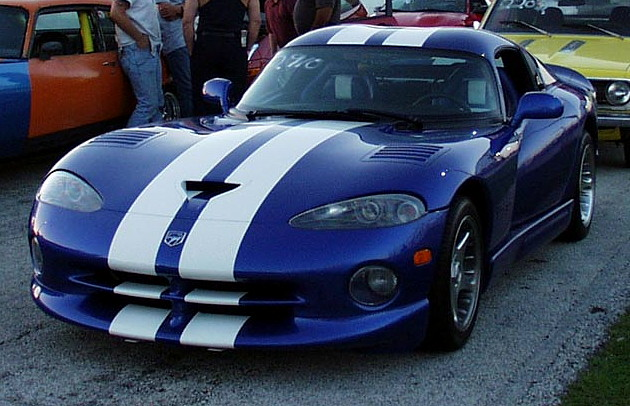
Dodge Viper GTS with "Viper Stripes"

== Watercraft ==
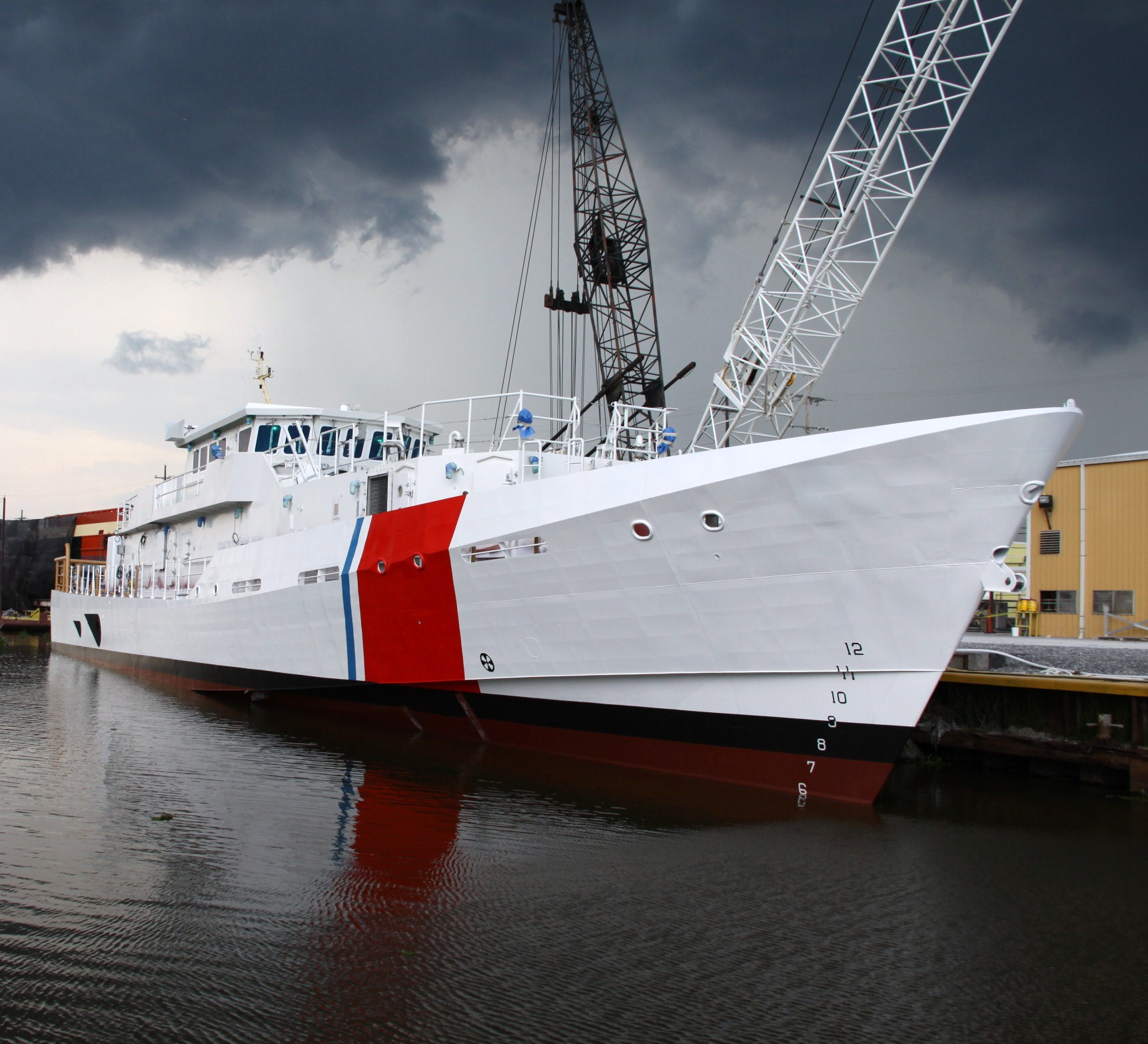
Some coast guards and other comparable seaborne law enforcement agencies utilize a distinctively-colored slanting stripe or stripes on the hulls for identification and differentiation

Many coast guard-type organizations have diagonally-slanted lines on their vessels' hulls. An example is the service mark of the United States Coast Guard.

Albania

Argentina

Bangladesh

Canada

China

Croatia

Cyprus

Egypt

European Union

Finland

France

Georgia

Germany (Federal Coast Guard)

Germany (Maritime Search and Rescue Service)

Greece

Iceland

India

Indonesia

Italy

Japan

Kenya

Libya

Malaysia

Maldives

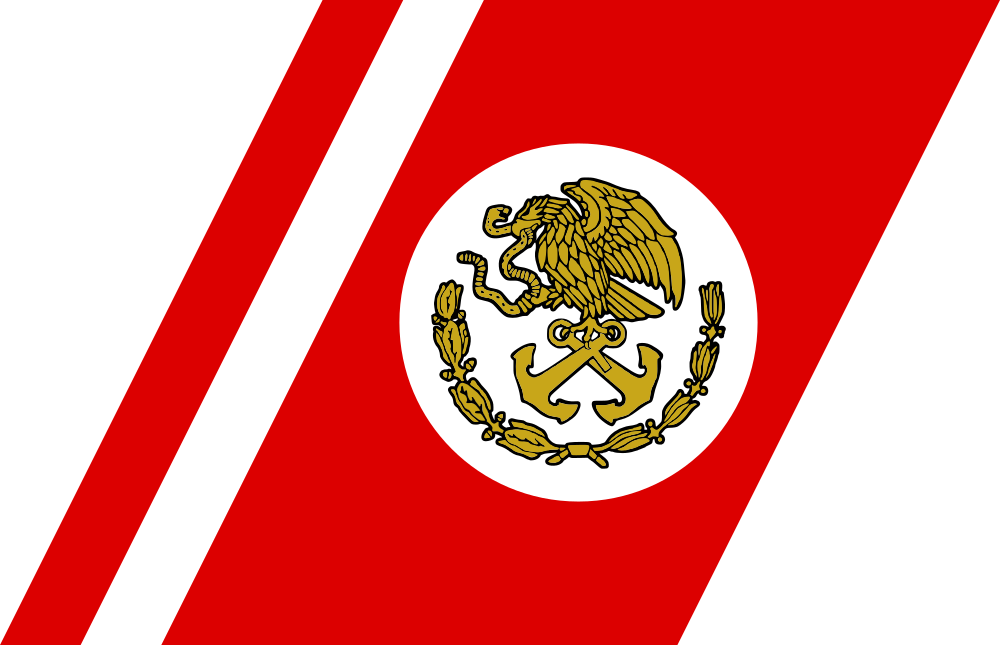
Mexico

Myanmar

Netherlands

Norway

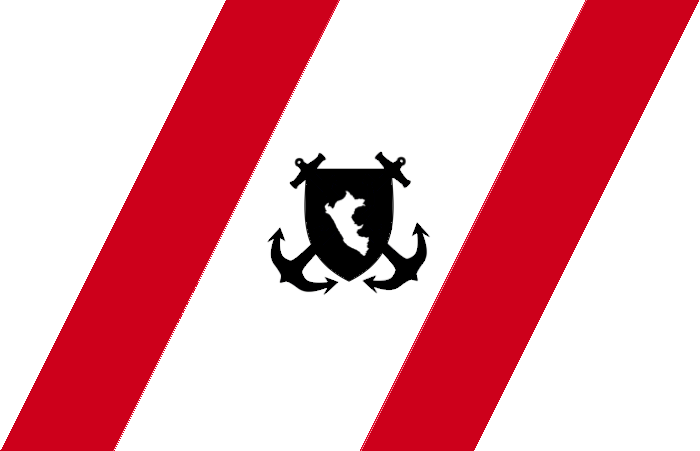
Peru

Poland

Philippines

Romania

Russia

Singapore

South Korea

Spain (Salvamento Marítimo)

Spain (Civil Guard SEMAR)

Sri Lanka

Sweden

Taiwan

Turkey

Ukraine

United Kingdom

United States (Coast Guard)

United States (Coast Guard Auxiliary)

United States (Customs and Border Protection)

Vietnam

Yemen

== See also ==
- Fin flash
- List of international auto racing colours
