= National Intelligence Service (Kenya) =

Intelligence agency of Kenya

- Huduma ya Ujasusi ya Kitaifa
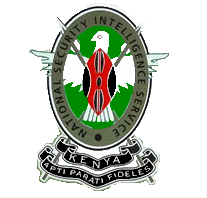
- Emblem of the NSIS

Agency overview
- Formed: 1926; 100 years ago as Special Branch and Act of Parliament; 31 December 1998
- Preceding agencies: Special Branch (SB); Directorate of Security Intelligence (DSI); National Security Intelligence Service (NSIS)
- Headquarters: Maruruis, Nairobi, Kenya
- Motto: Apti Parati Fideles(English: "Capable, Available and Reliable")
- Employees: Classified
- Annual budget: Classified
- Agency executive: Noordin Mohamed Haji, Director-General
- Parent agency: Kenya

The National Intelligence Service (NIS; Swahili: Huduma ya Ujasusi ya Kitaifa) known as the National Security Intelligence Service (NSIS) until 1999, is both the domestic and foreign intelligence agency of Kenya. It had its origins in "Special Branch" a department of the national police that was created in 1952 under the British administration. Among other things, it provided intelligence during the Mau Mau rebellion.

== History ==
=== 19th-century Kenyan intelligence ===
The Nandi, on hearing of the British, sought to attack them. On the other hand, the Kamba people responded differently to the British as they had traversed the central and coastal areas as long-distance traders during which they gathered information for their leaders. British colonialists recruited mercenaries as porters and guides. First, the mercenaries provided information but, later, they served as community chiefs, displacing traditional leaders. This meant that most of those who became chiefs were opportunists. Later still, the government of the Kenya Protectorate began intelligence gathering which is shown in the timeline below.

=== Colonial era ===
The colonial system did not destroy existing networks, but used them to build a new intelligence system. The colonial government initially gathered information from tourists, missionaries and traders, but after 1895 gathered information at the local level through commissioners and retainers, including from African allies and collaborators. From 1906, intelligence reports were submitted to the Commissioner of the East Africa Protectorate.

The British East African Police was established in 1892, and for 18 years gathered intelligence. During World War One, the focus of intelligence gathering changed from African affairs to information on enemy activities in neighbouring countries. African agents were recruited to tap telegraphic communications, track the enemy and visit other African workers to gather information. Coastal traders engaged in counter-intelligence.

=== Special Branch (SB) ===
In 1926, a Criminal Investigations Division was created, staffed by colonists, and involving a Special Branch responsible for intelligence. From the end of World War Two until 1963, the SB's activities expanded from the collection of intelligence on criminal activities to investigation of citizens agitating for independence and the trade union movement. The SB also expanded to combat the Mau Mau insurgency and was reorganised following intelligence failures. The post-independence government inherited an intelligence mentality that used force to ensure compliance. After 1965, police and intelligence services became politicised and linked to individuals. By 1982, the police force (including the SB) had become a tool of oppression, systematically abusing the law and disregarding the constitution.

In 1998, however, the National Security Intelligence Service was created, and over 170 SB officers were purged from the NSIS. In 1999, the NSIS and the police were separated, arrest authority was removed from the NSIS, and a tribunal was established for complaints against the intelligence service.

=== Directorate of Security Intelligence (DSI) ===
In 1963, with independence approaching, Special Branch was made independent from the police and, in 1969, it was given a new charter. It wasn't until 1986 that it was transformed into the Directorate of Security Intelligence (DSI).

=== National Security Intelligence Service ===
In 1998, a new act of Parliament established the National Security Intelligence Service (NSIS) to replace the former Directorate of Security Intelligence which at the time was still colloquially known as "Special Branch". The first director general (DG) of the new service was retired Brigadier Wilson Boinett, who served until 2006 when he was replaced by Major-General Michael Gichangi. In January 2011, Gichangi was appointed for a second five-year term. However, Gichangi did not complete his term and resigned his position in August 2014, citing personal reasons. His replacement, Major-General Philip Kameru, then serving as the head of military intelligence, was appointed in September after vetting by the National Assembly.

NSIS's intelligence gathering work includes internal, external and strategic intelligence. The NSIS is charged with identifying conditions that threaten Kenya's political, economic and social stability. It develops techniques and strategies to neutralise such threats. The NSIS director is the national security advisor to the President of Kenya.

The NSIS was relocated from the notorious offices of Special Branch at Nyati House to new headquarters on the outskirts of Nairobi, near the Windsor Golf and Country Hotel. In April 1999, the Moi government appointed Pamela Mboya, the former permanent representative to the UN Habitat, to head a Committee that was charged with formulating a scheme of service for NSIS officers.

Security of tenure given to the Director General of NSIS is designed to protect them from abuse by members of the governing elite. They have the opportunity to say 'no' to any unlawful or sectarian instructions from their bosses without fear of losing their job.

=== National Intelligence Service ===
The NSIS was briefly renamed National Security Intelligence Service (NSIS) before settling on its current name, National Intelligence Service (NIS).

== Mission ==
The National Intelligence Service in Kenya is concerned with:

- Detecting and identifying any potential threat to Kenya
- Advising the President and Government of any security threat to Kenya
- Taking steps to protect the security interests of Kenya whether political, military or economic
- Vetting people that may hold positions that require security clearance.

== Divisions ==
NIS is divided into seven directorates led by:

1. a director of administration
2. a director of information technology
3. a director of internal intelligence
4. a director of external intelligence
5. a director of economic affairs, concerned with analysis and production
6. a director of operations
7. a director of the National Intelligence Academy.

== Controversies and abuse of authority ==
=== Abductions and extrajudicial killings ===
In January 2019, a UN expert report alleged that NIS officers were involved in the tracking, abduction and rendition of South Sudanese activists, who were flown from Nairobi and then executed in Juba. In January 2025, Justin Muturi alleged the NIS to be involved in the abduction of his son while he was cabinet secretary. In July 2025, Rigathi Gachagua alleged that a 101-strong militia was recruited and trained to work within NIS with a mission of tracking, abducting, killing and covering up, while receiving instructions from the Director General for the abuse of authority actions. According to Gachagua, the militia was recruited and trained while he served as deputy president. Gachagua further alleged that 40 members of NIS were assigned to trail him while on a two-month tour of the US, intending to endanger his safety and trigger unrest in Kenya.

== Complaints against excesses and abuse of authority instances by the NIS ==
In December 2024, the Public Service Commission recruited members of the Intelligence Service Complaints Board (ISCB). The Board, created under Section 66 of the NIS Service Act, 2012, is tasked with receiving and investigating complaints against the NIS and its officers.

== See also ==
- Criminal Investigation Department
