= Vincent Naisho Loonena =

Kenyan military officer

Brigadier Vincent Naisho Loonena Japheth
- Born: Kenya
- Occupation: Military Officer
- Known for: Military Matters
- Title: Director General of Kenya Coast Guard Service.

Brigadier Vincent Naisho Loonena is a Kenyan military officer in the Kenya Defence Forces (KDF). Effective 2018, he was till April 12, 2023 the Director General of Kenya Coast Guard Service (KCGS), a specialized maritime force of the Republic of Kenya, responsible for law enforcement on national waters, including on the oceans, lakes and rivers. Prior to his current assignment, he was the managing director of the KDF Medical Insurance Program, where he had served for four months, since July 2018.

== Background ==
At the time of his appointment to his current assignment, Brigadier Loonena had experience as an officer in the Kenya Navy, that exceeded 20 years. In the past, he served as the Commander of the Mtongwe Naval Base, in Mombasa, Kenya's second-largest city, along the Indian Ocean coast.

== As Director General of KCGS ==
In his previous assignment Brigadier Loonena as DG directed a diverse specialized staff, including members of the Kenyan military, intelligence officers, marine experts and scientists, police law enforcement officers and customs officials, as well as civilian administrators. The KCGS is responsible for protecting the country's waters against dumping of harmful waste and pollutants, search and rescue services, and the arrest of unauthorized fishermen, among other functions.

== See also ==
- Uhuru Kenyatta
- Kenya Army
- Kenya Air Force

Military offices
Preceded by None; As Director General of Kenya Coast Guard Service	Director General of Kenya Coast Guard Service; 2018 - present	Succeeded by Incumbent; As Director General of Kenya Coast Guard Service
