= Timboroa =

Town in Kenya

Coordinates: 0°04′N 35°33′E

Timboroa (also Timbaroa and Tomborou) is a small town in Baringo County, Kenya. It is located near the border with Uasin Gishu County with the boundary being the most northwesterly point of Timboroa Forest leading on to Tinderet Forest in a westerly direction. Timboroa lies along the Equator Line. The area is mainly covered with bamboo grasses. Other small townships located in the Timboroa area are Matharu, Hiloti (Corruption from English Hill Tea), Mumberes, Equator, Makutano, Mlango Moja through to Mlango Tano. The region is home to a number of notable athletes, both male and female, including Bernard Barmasai.

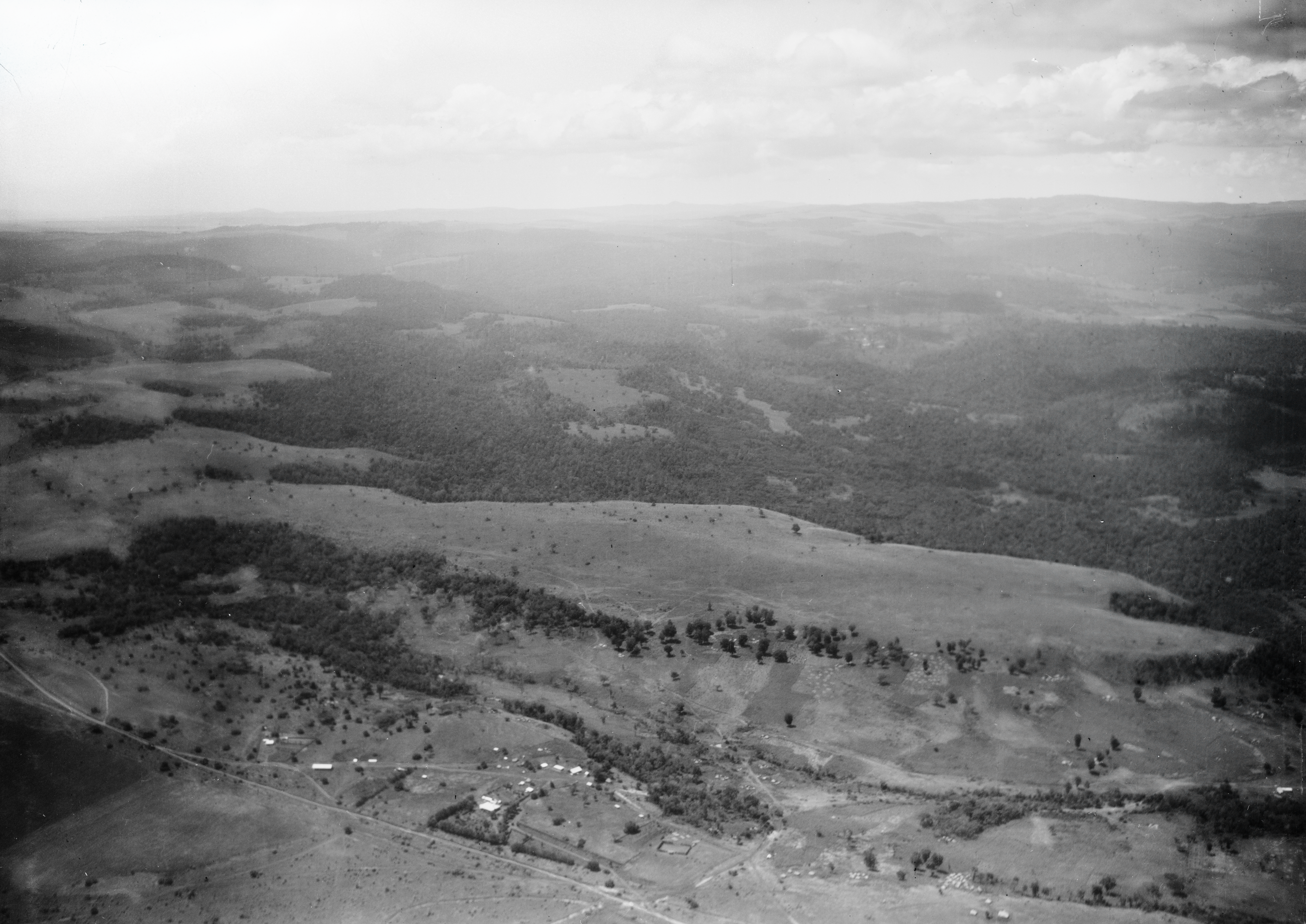
Timboroa 2894 m.a.s.l., the highest railroad station of the English Empire. Picture taken by Walter Mittelholzer 1929-1930

== Administration ==
The town is administered from Mumberes Division of Koibatek District in the former Rift Valley Province and Eldama Ravine Subcounty of Baringo County. The current area chief for the Timboroa location is Mr Jacob Njehia and the assistant chief is Mr Edward Waweru.

== Origin of Timboroa name ==
It acquired its name from Kalenjin word Tim-boroowon which literally means 'a forest full of long ropes', which is the case since Timboroa has a thick bamboo forest with natural trees straddled with climbers.

== Post election violence ==
In the civil violence of the aftermath of the 2007 elections, the town was completely destroyed. Timboroa was located just off of the A-104 motorway.

== Climate and weather ==
The town is 9557 ft above sea level and hence one of the coldest or chilliest areas in Kenya comparable with Mt Kenya Region. During the months of June–August thick fog engulfs the entire area. Timboroa is the highest point of the Kenyan Highlands where people live. The Batian peak of Mount Kenya at 17,057 ft is, however, the tallest overall point in Kenya - although it's not habitable unlike the Timboroa Forest.

== Agriculture ==
It is a very rich agricultural area known for potato growing and one can see women selling potatoes by the roadside. The place is known for potatoes such as 'shangii' and Nyayo. Many farmers rear Merino sheep. It was a major pyrethrum growing area before 2000 before pyrethrum prices became unbearably low.

== Broadcast transmitter sites ==
The Timboroa television and FM radio station broadcasts from the mountain to the south of the town.

== Education ==
Timboroa is home to several primary and secondary schools including the oldest primary school in the region, Timboroa Primary School which was started in 1908. Other Primary schools include Nyakio Primary School, Kirima Primary School, Muchorwe Primary School, Matharu Primary School, Kamura Primary School, Tarigo primary school, Emmanuel junior academy, and several secondary schools such as Timboroa Boys Secondary, Kamura Day Secondary, Nyakio Mixed Day Secondary School, St. Mary's Boito Mixed Day Secondary School among others.
