= Directorate of Criminal Investigations =

Agency overview
- Formed: 1926 (as Criminal Investigation Department)

Jurisdictional structure
- Operations jurisdiction: Kenya

Operational structure
- Headquarters: Mazingira Complex, Kiambu Road, Nairobi, Kenya
- Agency executive: Mohamed Ibrahim Amin, Director
- Parent agency: National Police Service (Kenya)

Website
- www.dci.go.ke

The Directorate of Criminal Investigations (DCI), formerly the Criminal Investigation Department (CID), is a department within the National Police Service of Kenya. It is responsible for investigating serious crimes, coordinating criminal intelligence, and advancing forensic capabilities. Headquartered at Mazingira Complex, Kiambu Road, Nairobi, the DCI operates under the legal framework of the National Police Service Act 2011 and Article 247 of the Constitution of Kenya.

== History ==
The DCI originated from the Kenya Police, founded in 1887 by the Imperial British East Africa Company. It was formalized in 1906 under the Police Ordinance, developing units such as the Fingerprint Section (1909) and the Criminal Intelligence Unit (1926). Following the 2010 Constitution, the department was renamed and restructured as the DCI to meet modern investigative requirements.

== Legal framework ==
The DCI operates under the following legal provisions:

- Constitution of Kenya (2010): Article 247 establishes the National Police Service, with the DCI as a key component.
- National Police Service Act 2011: Part V, Sections 28 and 35 outline the DCI's mandate, including crime investigation, intelligence coordination, and forensic analysis.
- Criminal Procedure Code: Governs investigative procedures and evidence handling.
- Coordination with DPP: Article 157(4) of the Constitution requires the DCI to follow instructions issued by the Director of Public Prosecutions (DPP).

== Leadership ==
The DCI is led by a Director appointed by the President of Kenya, reporting to the Inspector General of Police. Since 2010, the title has been "Director of Criminal Investigations." The current director is Mohamed Ibrahim Amin, appointed in 2022.

=== Historical leadership ===
Directors of the Directorate of Criminal Investigations (1935–Present)
S/No.	Rank	Name	Tenure
1	Superintendent in Charge	Neil Stewart M.M	1935–1949
2	Assistant Commissioner of Police (ACP)	Alfred William Riggs	1950–1951
3	ACP	John Timmerman	1951–1955
4	ACP	Hugh R. Walker	1956–1957
5	Senior Assistant Commissioner of Police (S/ACP)	Leslie G. Mitchell	1957–1960
6	S/ACP	Thomas P. McBrierley	1960–1965
7	S/ACP	Peter O. Ochieng	1965–1974
8	Deputy Commissioner of Police (DCP)	Ignatius I. Nderi	1974–1984
9	Senior Deputy Commissioner of Police (S/DCP)	Noah N. Too	1984–1999
10	Senior Deputy Commissioner of Police I (S/DCPI)	Francis K. Sang	1999–2003
11	Senior Deputy Commissioner of Police II (S/DCPII)	Daniel T. Ndung’u	2003–2004
12	Senior Deputy Commissioner of Police I (SDCP1)	Joseph M. Kamau	2004–2006
13	DCP	Simon K. Gatiba	2006–2010
14	Director of Criminal Investigations (DCI)	Francis N. Muhoro	2010–2018
15	DCI	George M. Kinoti	2018–2022
16	DCI	Mohamed Ibrahim Amin	2022–Present

=== Current deputy directors ===
- Paul Njogu (Operations)
- Esther Seroney (Administration)

== Organizational structure ==
The DCI comprises specialized directorates, units, and regional commands to fulfill its mandate.

=== Directorates ===
Key Directorates at DCI Headquarters
Directorate	Function
Administration	Manages human resources and logistics
Operations	Oversees field operations
Investigation	Handles serious crime case management
Forensic	Conducts DNA, ballistics, toxicology, and digital forensics
Crime Research Intelligence Bureau (CRIB)	Analyzes criminal intelligence
National Central Bureau	Coordinates with Interpol
Counter Terrorism Centre of Excellence	Focuses on terrorism prevention

=== Specialized units ===
- Special Operations Group (SOG): Elite tactical unit for high-risk operations.
- Serious Crime Unit (SCU): Investigates homicides and major felonies.
- Cybercrime Unit: Addresses digital fraud and cyber threats (established post-2020).
- Economic and Commercial Crimes Unit (ECCU): Tackles money laundering and securities fraud (est. 2013).
- Transnational Organized Crime Unit: Combats human and drug trafficking.
- Public Complaints Department: Handles public grievances.

=== Disbanded units ===
- Special Service Unit (SSU): Disbanded in 2019 due to allegations of extrajudicial activities.
- Flying Squad: Disbanded in 2020 following misconduct concerns.

=== Formations ===
- Anti-Terrorism Police Unit (ATPU): Counters terrorism.
- Sting Squad Headquarters (SSH): Conducts undercover operations.
- Kenya Airports Police Unit (KAPU): Secures airports.
- Kenya Railways Police Unit (KRPU): Protects railway infrastructure.
- DCI Academy: Provides training in investigative techniques.

=== Regional and county commands ===
- 8 Regional Commands led by Regional Criminal Investigations Officers (RCIOs).
- 47 County Offices managed by County Criminal Investigation Officers (CCIOs).
- Over 297 Sub-County Offices for local investigations.

== Core functions ==
The DCI's mandate, as per the National Police Service Act 2011, includes:

1. Investigating serious crimes (e.g., homicide, terrorism, cybercrime, trafficking)
2. Collecting and analyzing criminal intelligence
3. Maintaining law and order
4. Detecting and preventing crimes
5. Apprehending offenders
6. Managing national criminal records
7. Conducting forensic analysis
8. Executing DPP directives
9. Investigating IPOA-referred cases
10. Coordinating with international police organizations

== Resources ==
=== Forensic Science Laboratory ===
A KSh 5.7 billion facility at Mazingira Complex, equipped with:

- Biological, Chemistry, DNA, and Toxicology Laboratories
- Advanced evidence processing for firearms and digital devices

=== DCI Academy ===
The DCI Academy provides training in investigative techniques, forensics, and intelligence analysis. It is based in South C, Nairobi, Kenya.

=== Technology ===
- Digital case management systems
- Cybercrime investigation tools
- Online reporting via the eCitizen portal

== Controversies and reforms ==
- Extrajudicial Killings: The DCI has faced scrutiny from the Independent Policing Oversight Authority (IPOA) over alleged extrajudicial activities, notably by the disbanded SSU.
- Anti-Corruption Measures: Digitization via eCitizen and disbandment of SSU and Flying Squad aim to curb misconduct
- International Oversight: Human Rights Watch has documented concerns about police accountability mechanisms

== Collaboration with other agencies ==
The DCI maintains extensive international partnerships:

- Federal Bureau of Investigation (FBI): Joint operations on transnational crimes and counter-terrorism
- Israeli Police and Mossad: Counter-terrorism training and intelligence sharing
- United Kingdom National Crime Agency: Combating financial crimes and cyber threats
- Interpol: Coordinates transnational crime investigations
- National Intelligence Service (NIS): Provides strategic intelligence
- Kenya Defence Forces (KDF): Supports national security operations
- Office of the Director of Public Prosecutions (ODPP): Guides prosecutorial investigations

== See also ==
- National Police Service (Kenya)
- National Intelligence Service (Kenya)
- Kenya Defence Forces
- Independent Policing Oversight Authority (IPOA)
