= Kenya Police =

Law enforcement agency

Kenya Police Service Idara ya Polisi wa Kenya
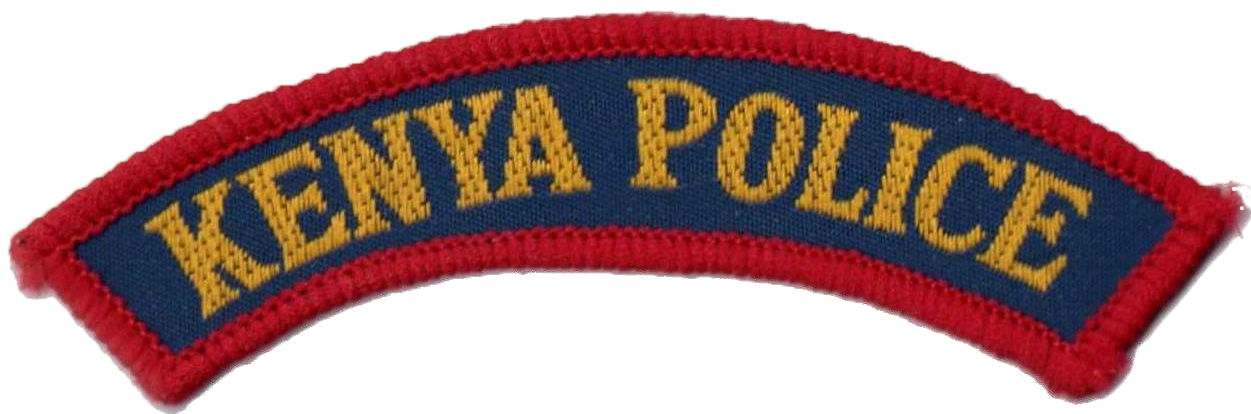
- The Kenya Police patch.

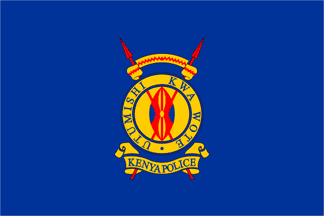
- Flag of the Kenya Police
- Common name: Kenya Police
- Abbreviation: KPS
- Motto: Utumishi kwa Wote (English: "Service to All")

Agency overview
- Formed: 1906
- Employees: approx. 101,000=

Jurisdictional structure
- Operations jurisdiction: KEN
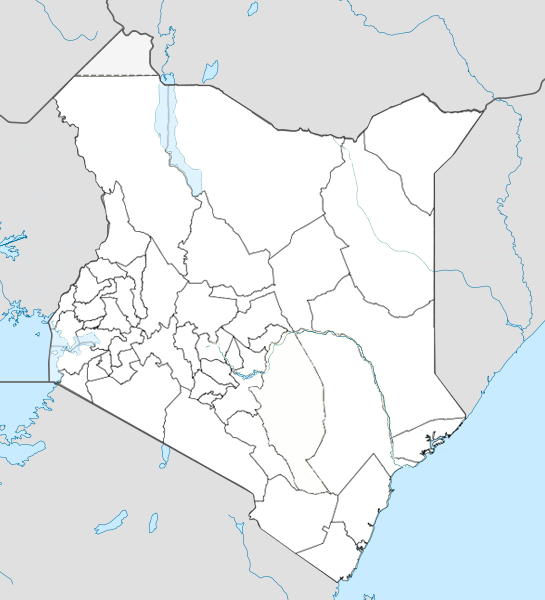
- Map of Kenya Police Service's jurisdiction
- Area: 581,309 square kilometres (224,445 sq mi)
- Population: 47,564,000 Kenya
- Primary governing body: Kenya
- Secondary governing body: IPOA
- General nature: Civilian police

Operational structure
- Overseen by: Kenya Police Service Commission
- Headquarters: Vigilance House, Harambee Ave, Nairobi
- Police Officers: 80,000 (approx)
- Agency executive: Inspector General Police, Douglas Kanja
- Parent agency: National Police Service
- Units: List: •Kenya Police Service Headquarters; • General Service Unit (GSU); • Kenya Police Traffic Unit; • Presidential Escort Unit; • Kenya Airports Police Unit; • Kenya Railways & Ports Police Unit; • K9 Police Unit; • Nairobi Metropolitan Police; • Diplomatic Police Unit; • Tourist Police Unit; • Kenya Police Marine Unit; • Kenya Police Quick Response Unit; • Government Vehicle Check Unit
- Counties: Counties of Kenya

Facilities
- Airbases: Wilson Airport
- Mil Mi-17, MBB Bo 105 Cessnas: 15

Website
- kenyapolice.go.ke

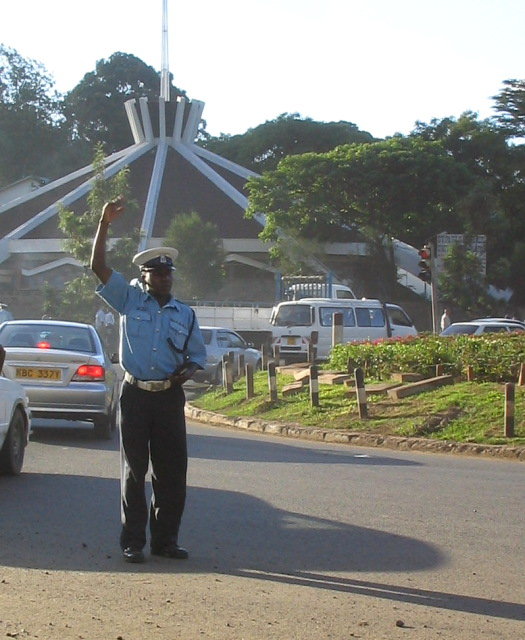
Kenya Police Officer on traffic duties in Nairobi City.

The Kenya Police Service is the national police force and law enforcement agency of the Republic of Kenya. It is subordinate to the National Police Service which is headed by an Inspector General of Police who exercises independent command over the Service. Kenya Police is headed by Deputy Inspector General. Kenya Police is divided into Service Headquarters in Nairobi, Formations, General Duty Commands and Training Institutions.

The Administration Police is commanded through a hierarchy separate from that of the Kenya Police. For other state security bodies see Law enforcement in Kenya. Recruitment to the police service is done on yearly basis.

== History ==
The Kenya police force was established as a British colonial police force in 1907. From 1887 to 1902 policing was provided by the East Africa Trading Company. After 1902 the Kenya-Uganda Railway introduced their own police units.

In 1906 the Police Ordinance was established to create a new force in 1907, the Nairobi Mounted Police within the jurisdiction of the East Africa Protectorate. The current force's name came into effect in 1920 with the newly created British Kenya Colony.

The colonial force was made up mainly of British and Indian recruits as senior officers and Africans amongst lower ranks.

Following Kenya's independence, the British officers were replaced with local Kenyan members.

== Structure ==
=== General ===
The Kenya Police is structured into two main categories: General Duty and Formations. General Duty includes various levels, with regions being the highest and police patrol bases being the most basic units.

Regional Police Commander is in charge of a Region (formerly Provinces), County Police Commander is in charge of Officers in the County(previously called District), Sub-County Police Commander Superintends Sub-County (previously called Division). Officer Commanding Station (OCS) is in charge of a Police Station in a Ward and oversees all its Police Posts and Patrol Bases (Ward Commander).

=== Formations ===
The Kenya Police formations/Units are headed by commandants/directors, who hold the rank of Senior Assistant Inspector General, Assistant Inspector General of Police (AIG) or Commissioner of Police (CP).

These formations are listed as under:

Unit	Headquarters	Leadership
General Service Unit (GSU)	Nairobi	Commandant Douglas Kanja (Inspector General of Police, 2025)
Diplomatic Police Unit	Nairobi	Headed by a Commandant
Traffic Police Department	Nairobi	Headed by a Commandant
Kenya Police College	Kiganjo, Nyeri County	Headed by a Commandant
Kenya Police Air Wing	Nairobi	Headed by a Commandant
Presidential Escort Unit	State House, Nairobi	Headed by a Commandant
Railways Police	Nairobi	Headed by a Commandant
Kenya Police Dog Unit	Nairobi	Headed by a Commandant
Tourist Police Unit	Old Nairobi Area Provincial Police HQ, Nairobi	Headed by a Commandant
Kenya Airports Police Unit	Nairobi (plus divisions at Nairobi, Eldoret, Moi airports)	Headed by a Commandant
Maritime Police Unit	Kilindini Harbour, Mombasa	Headed by a Commanding Officer

=== Police ranks ===
The Kenya Police wear badges of rank on the shoulders (Inspector-General – Inspector) and sleeve (senior sergeant – constable) of their uniform to denote their rank. In line with the ongoing reforms, the uniforms committee is also working on new insignia for the revised rank structure, which will have to be approved by the National Police Service Commission. The order of Kenya Police ranks is as follows:

- Inspector-General (formerly Commissioner of Police)
- Deputy Inspector-General
- Senior Assistant Inspector-General
- Assistant Inspector-General
- Commissioner of Police
- Senior Superintendent
- Superintendent
- Assistant Superintendent
- Chief Inspector
- Inspector
- Senior Sergeant
- Sergeant
- Corporal
- Constable

== Ongoing changes ==
Following the promulgation of the new Constitution of Kenya on 27 August 2010, as laid down in Chapter 17 Part 4, the Kenyan police forces is undergoing a series of reforms. Hence called The Kenya Police Service, it is now headed by a Deputy Inspector-General and the division of its functions are organised to take into account the devolved structure of government in Kenya.

In the ongoing changes that started in 2018, police operational command was aligned police with existing administrative boundaries to create a unified command as follows:

- Regional Police Commander (RPC)
- County Police Commander (CPC)
- Sub County Police Commander (SPC)
- Officer in charge Police Station (OCS)

The following positions were therefore abolished:

- APS Regional Commander
- KPS Regional Commander
- DCI Regional Commander
- County Coordinating Commander
- KPS County Commander
- APS County Commander
- DCI County Commander
- APS Sub County Commander
- DCI Sub County Commander
- KPS Officer Commanding Police Divisions
- District Administration Police Commander

Consequently, the number of commanders were reduced from 168 to 56 Commanders.

== Equipment ==
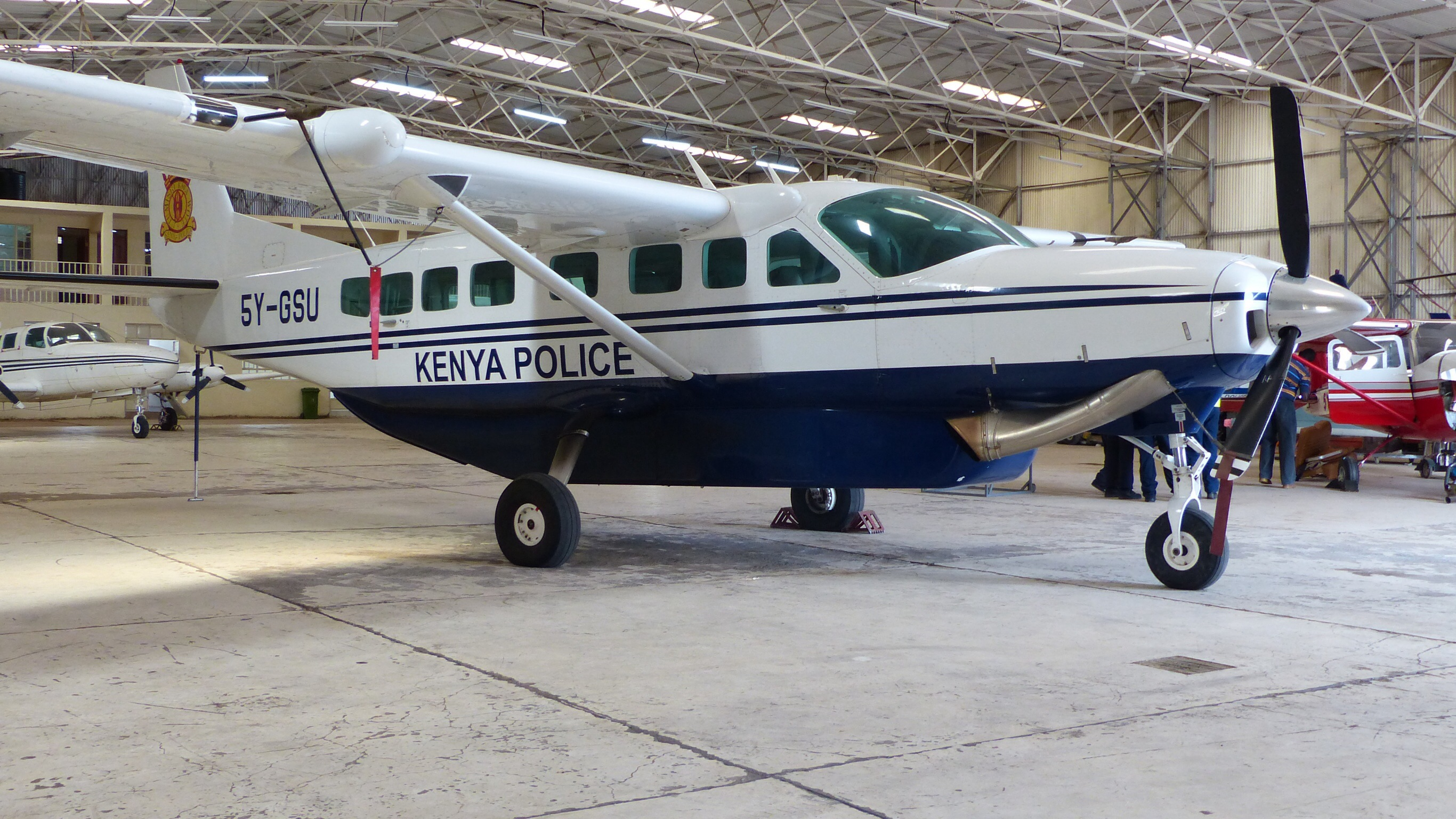
Kenya Police Cessna 208 Caravan

The equipment of the Kenya Police and General Service Unit (GSU), a paramilitary wing of the Kenyan Police, comprises:

=== Aircraft ===
- 2 Cessna fixed wing aircraft (United States), the latest (2011) being a Cessna 208 Caravan light aircraft
- 1 AS350 B3e Ecureuil helicopter (France) (January 2012), June 2012, crashed, total loss, with 6 fatalities.
- 4 Mil Mi-17 helicopters (Russia)
- 4 Bell 206 helicopters (United States)
- 3 AW139 helicopters (Italy), one of which crashed without fatalities resulting in being written off
- 1 AW119 Koala helicopter (Italy)

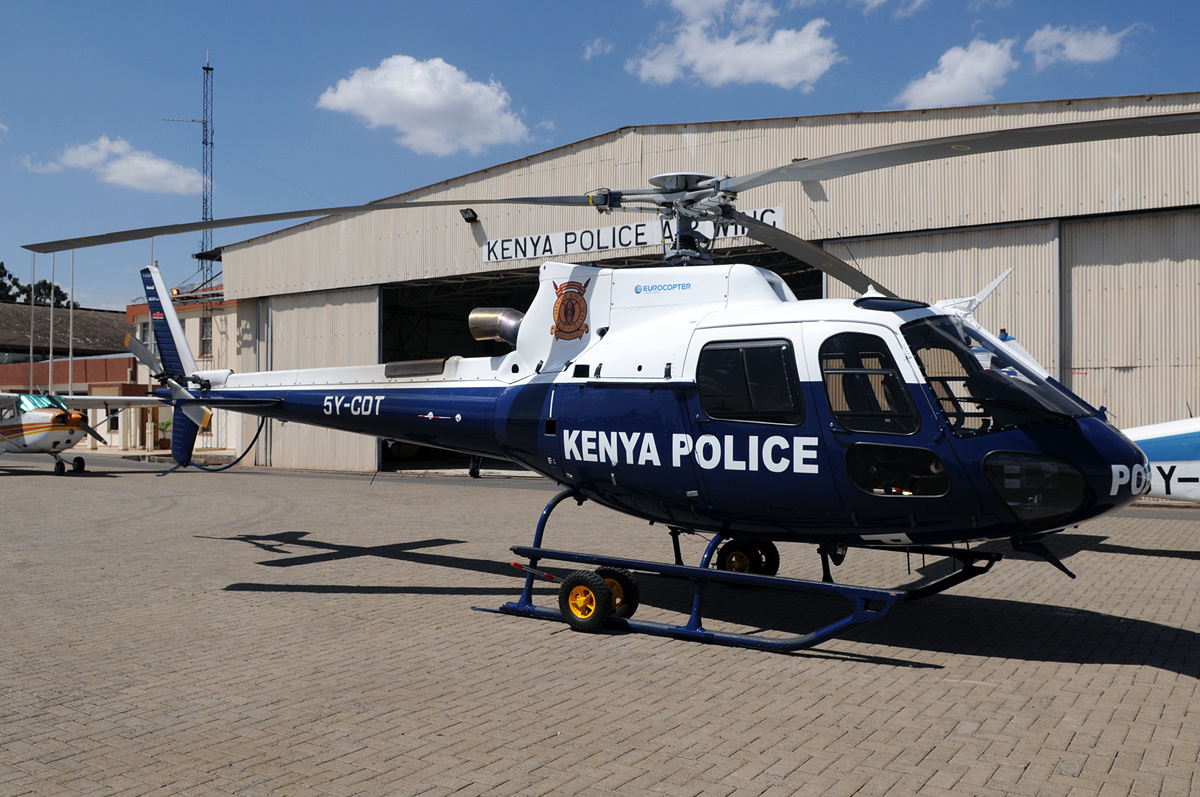
Kenya Police Eurocopter AS350

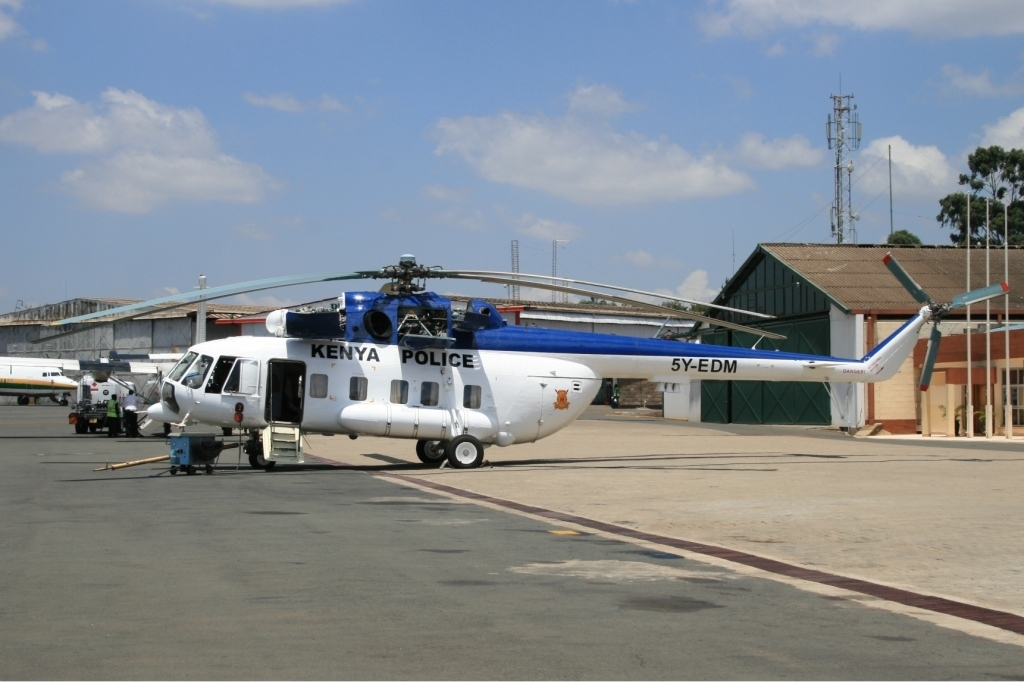
Kenya Police Mil Mi-17

=== Weapons ===
- G3 Rifle
- AK-47 Rifle
- MP5 Submachine Gun
- Scorpion EVO 3 A1 Submachine gun
- M16 assault rifles
- M4 carbines
- Glock Pistol
- Browning Pistol
- Jericho 94 Pistol
- CZ 75 Pistol
- M79 grenade launchers
- M67 recoilless rifle

=== Vehicles ===
- 30 VN-4 Armoured Personnel Carriers (GSU)
- Troop carrying vehicles
- Buses
- Vans
- Patrol cars – 4 x 4
- Water Cannons
- Patrol Cars-saloon
- Surveillance Vehicles 4 × 4 with radio
- Motorcycles
- M/Vs Civil disturbance
- Break downs/ Recovery Vehicles
- Fire Engines
- Water Bowsers
- Fuel Tankers
- Boats

== Societal impact ==
Following concerns about human right abuses by the Kenya Police, efforts are being made to reform the force. Some Kenyan policemen face challenges with their housing that has not been expanded or renovated since the 1970s. These challenges have resulted to corruption and crime. Extortion and bribery are known practices and the Kenyan people rank the police among the most corrupt bodies in the country. In July 2010, the Minister, George Saitoti, announced a 28% pay increase for junior officers and a 25% pay increase for senior officers. This reform means that the most junior officer, a police constable, shall receive KSh.21,000/= per month including allowances.

== See also ==
- Administration Police
- Kenya Defence Forces
- Kenya Coast Guard Service
- Directorate of Criminal Investigation (Kenya)
- Corruption in Kenya
- For other state security bodies see Law enforcement in Kenya
