= General Service Unit (Kenya) =

Paramilitary wing of the Kenya Police service

General Service Unit (GSU)
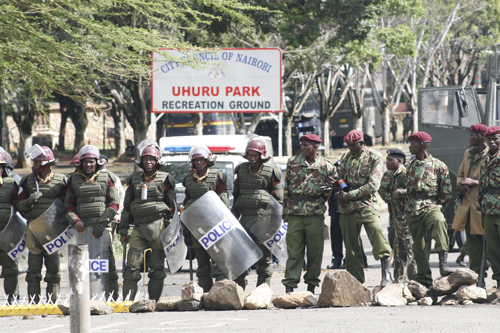
- General Service Unit police cordon off Uhuru Park to bar opposition from holding their mass protest rally, January 2008.

Agency overview
- Formed: August 1953
- Preceding agency: Emergency Company or Regular Police Reserve
- Employees: ≈6,000 (2003)

Jurisdictional structure
- National agency: Kenya
- Operations jurisdiction: Kenya
- General nature: Gendarmerie

Operational structure
- Headquarters: Nairobi, Kenya
- Agency executive: Johanna Tonui SAIG, Commandant
- Parent agency: Kenya Police Service

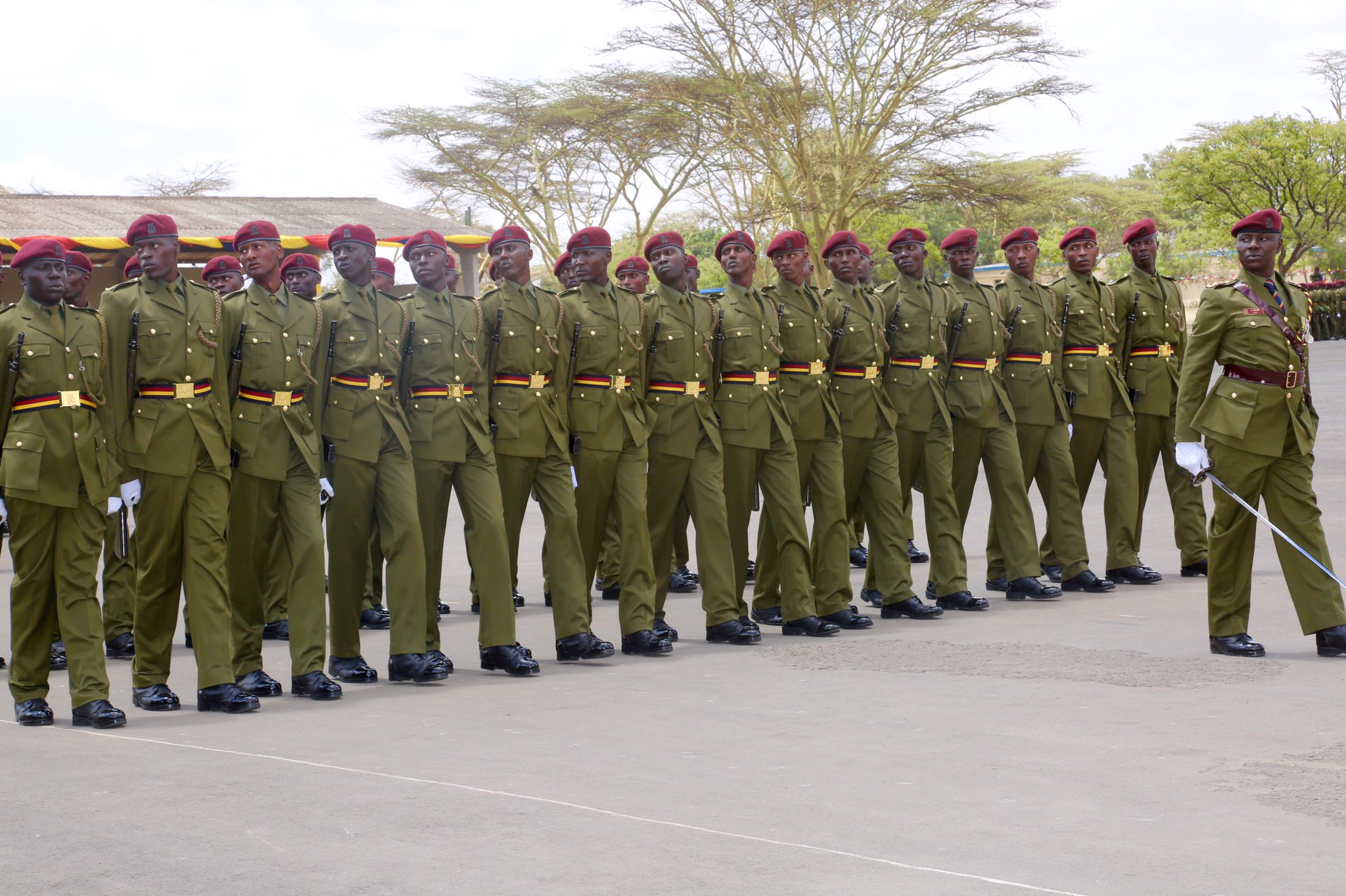
GSU officers in a parade.

The General Service Unit (GSU) is the gendarmerie branch of the Kenya Police Service, consisting of highly trained police officers, transported by seven dedicated Cessnas and three Bell helicopters. Having been in existence since 1948, the GSU has fought in a number of conflicts in and around Kenya, including the 1963 – 1969 Shifta War and the 1982 Kenyan coup.

== History ==
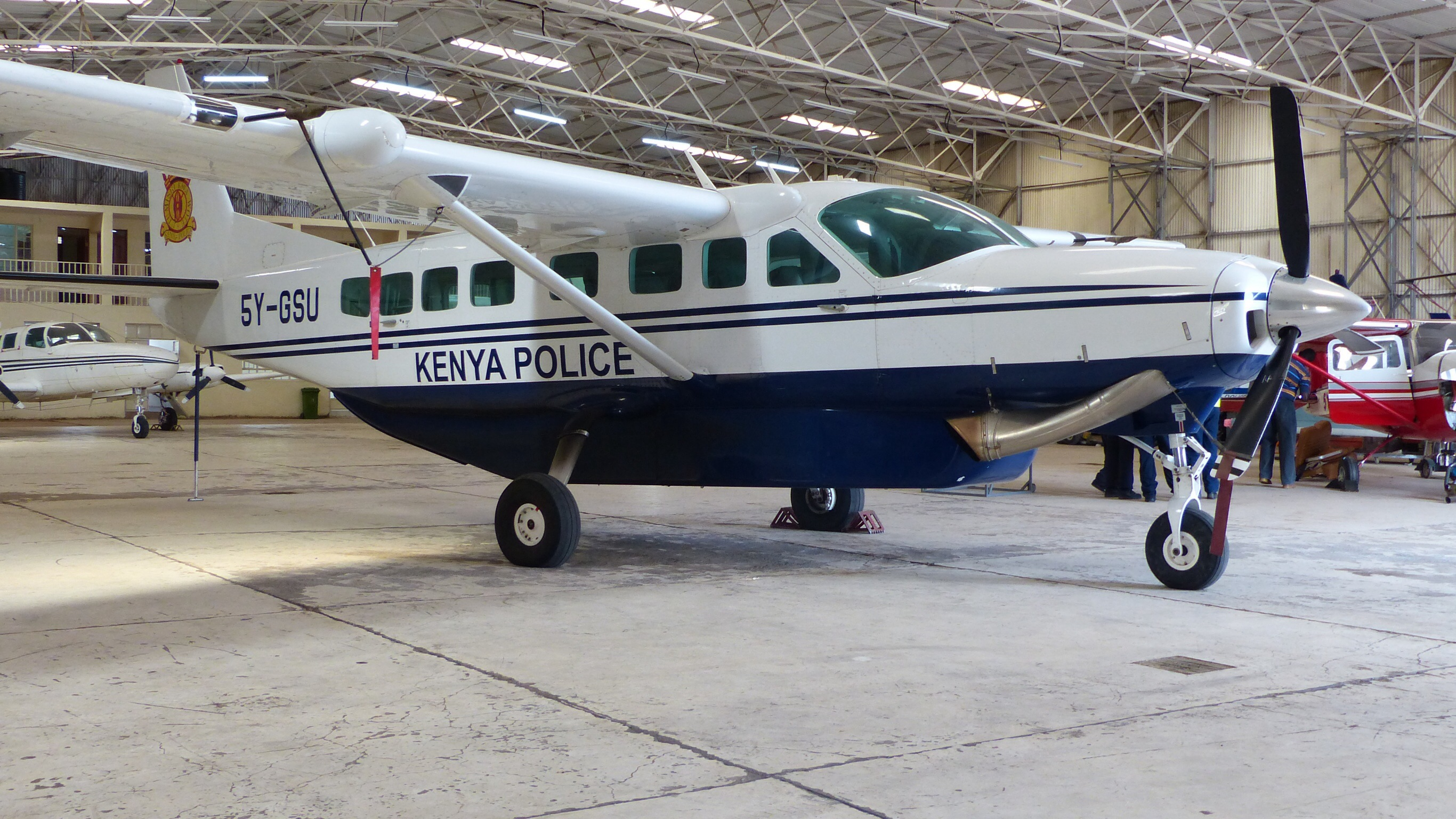
Police GSU Cessna 208 Caravan

Initially created as the Emergency Company or Regular Police Reserve in 1948, the GSU began as a unit of 50 men armed with Bren gun carriers and armoured cars and was involved in a number of uprisings including the Mau Mau Uprising before being renamed the General Service Unit in September 1953. The newly designated GSU consisted of 47 European officers and 1,058 Africans divided into 5 regional companies each consisting of a number of 39-man platoons. In 1957, the unit was re-organised and all the companies were brought under one commander, a S. G. Thomson. In 1961, the unit deployed outside Kenya for the first time to deal with civil unrest in Zanzibar, and then from 1963 until 1969 the GSU fought the secessionists during the Shifta War.

During the 1990s, the GSU worked in central Kenya to quell socialist political unrest and demonstrations against the Kenyan government, such as the Saba Saba Day (7 July) celebrations of 1990, where 30 people were killed as the police and General Service Units took action. More recently, in July 2005, troops of the GSU were sent to northern Kenya to seek out those responsible for the deaths of 76 people, 22 of them children, at a school in the area. The GSU helped prevent further friction between feuding Gabra and Borana communities when they were transported to the region by two police and two military helicopters, as well as two ministers from the Kenyan government. Currently, the GSU has around 5,000 paramilitary troops, of which 2,000 are the Israeli-trained and battle-hardened 'Recce group'. It is regulated under chapter seven of the National Police Service Standing Orders.

== Duties ==
The Kenya Police outlines the objectives of the GSU as follows:

1. To deal with situations affecting internal security throughout the republic.

2. To be an operational force that is not intended for use on duties of a permanent static nature.

3. To be a reserve force to deal with special operations and civil disorders.

It outlines the following functions:

1. Providing security to his Excellency the President, state houses / lodges.

2. Providing security for selected foreign Airlines.

3. Providing security to vital installations and strategic points.

4. Controlling rioters' mobs and civil disturbance.

5. Carrying out anti-poaching operations and escort duties.

6. Containing banditry and cattle rustling.

7. Countering terrorism activities and insurgencies

== Organization ==
=== Structure ===
The GSU is organised in Sub Units each hosting companies. Four of these Sub Units have commanding officers and they are regarded as the 'big four'. These are:

- The Headquarters Sub Unit based at Ruaraka Nairobi
- The National Police College Embakasi B Campus
- The Recce Sub Unit based at Ruiru,
- The (Presidential) Guard Sub Unit whose officers are solely charged with the duties of protecting the various state houses and lodges.

Additionally there are 23 field companies have Officer Commanding (OC), and are listed in alphabetical order starting from 'A' company to 'Y' company. There is no 'O' company. Each company consists of three platoons and the company headquarters personnel. Originally a platoon consisted of 30 personnel but nowadays a platoon can have as many as 60 members.

==== Commanders ====
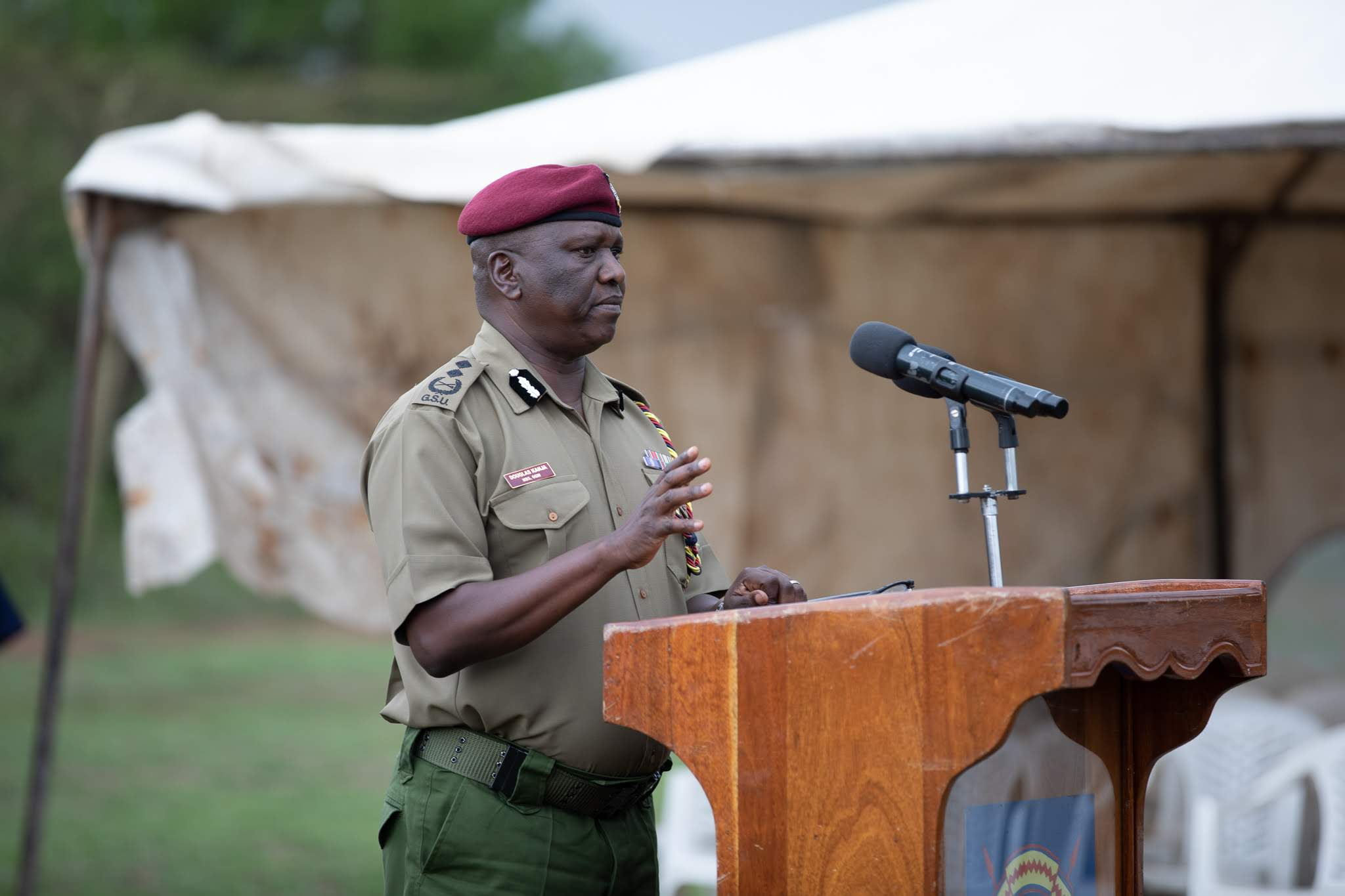
Douglas Kanja, former GSU Commandant.

- S. G. Thompson (19 May 1961 – 17 July 1961)
- S. G. Smith (27 July 1961 – 20 March 1963)
- Mackenzie (21 March 1963 – 26 February 1964)
- R. J. Angel (27 February 1964 – 17 April 1967)
- B. M. Gethi (18 April 1967 – 1 September 1978)
- P. Mbuthia (2 September 1978 – 24 August 1982)
- E. K. Mbijiwe (25 August 1982 – 8 April 1987)
- J. K. A. Kosgei (8 April 1987 – 9 March 1993)
- C. C. Kimurgor (10 March 1993 – 29 June 1999)
- S. K. Cheramboss (29 June 1999 – 30 August 2002)
- D. M. Kimaiyo (1 September 2002 – 15 January 2003)
- Lawrence Mwadime (16 January 2003 – 2 June 2005)
- Mathew Iteere – (2 June 2005 – 8 September 2009)
- William Saiya Aswenje (23 September 2009 – 20 March 2014)
- Joel Kitili Mboya (20 March 2014 – 2 September 2015)
- Stephen Chelimo (5 September 2015 – 7 July 2018)
- Douglas K. Kanja (8 July 2018- 12 April 2023)
- Eliud K. Lagat
- Ranson Lolmodooni (CURRENT COMMANDANT)

=== Personnel ===
Originally, GSU members were drawn from the existing ranks of the Kenyan Police force, were from a number of ethnic backgrounds, and were trained in the Kenya Police College and placed on a two-year tour of duty. However, with the increase of Africanisation in 1963, the majority of members were by 1967 from native Kenyan tribes such as the Luo or the Kikuyu who total 5.9 million, equal to about 13% and 7.4 million, equal to about 22% of Kenya's total population, respectively. Most recently, all GSU members have been trained at the GSU-specific Training School in Embakasi and its Field Training Camp in Magadi, on 10-month-long courses, with further 5-month long courses required for promotion. As with various branches of the Kenyan armed forces, the GSU also sends its officers to Great Britain to be trained in such facilities as the Britannia Royal Naval College and Sandhurst.
