= Fake PPO Probe =

The Fake PPO Probe was an investigation ordered by president Mwai Kibaki into claims that an individual named Joshua Waiganjo had for 10 years passed off as a top policeman. He is alleged to have sacked and abused junior officers, and attended top security meetings, posing as an assistant to the provincial police commissioner of Rift Valley Province.

== Arrest ==
On 4 January 2013 a man Joshua Karianjahi Waiganjo was arrested after allegedly pretending to be an assistant commissioner of police for five years. He was discovered after flying on a police helicopter to investigate the massacre of officers in Baragoi. He was charged with:

- Two counts of impersonating a police officer
- One count of illegal possession of police uniforms
- One count of robbery with violence.

== Probe Team ==
The President directed the Inspector General and National Police Service Commission to commence a probe on the incident. Head of Civil Service Francis Kimemia communicated the President’s directive.

=== Mandate ===
The National Police Service Commission announced a wider mandate of the probe committee:

- Establish whether Mr Waiganjo was a police officer or a police reservist
- Who recruited him
- Who gave orders and instructions
- What facilities, including transport, equipment and firearms, he was issued with
- Establish if the case was an isolated one

=== Membership ===
The investigation team members consisted of the following members of the National Police Service Commission:

- Former CID training school commandant Mary Awuor
- Former Administration Police commandant Major (Rtd) Shadrack Muiu
- Inspector General Mr Kimaiyo - later represented by CID deputy director Gideon Kimilu

The committee also included representatives from the Kenya National Human Rights Commission, the Public Service Commission, the Law Society of Kenya and the Attorney-General’s office. These were later confirmed as the following:

- Kioko Kilukumi - Law Society of Kenya (also vice-chairman of the probe)
- Edna Ameya - Kenya National Commission on Human Rights
- George Mukabi - Public Service Commission

== Family fights allegations ==
Waiganjo's family claimed that both former Police Commissioner Mathew Iteere and Rift Valley police boss John M'mbijiwe knew him. The family showed photographs of M'mbijiwe attending the burial of Waiganjo’s grandmother on August 10, 2012 at Njoro public cemetery

== Waiganjo Claims ==
As the probe hearings were underway, Waiganjo claimed in a television interview on 30 January 2013 that he was still receiving threats from senior police officers. He further requested an opportunity to meet Prime Minister Raila Odinga claiming to have sensitive information that has a bearing on the forthcoming General Election. Speaking at a political rally, Odinga indicated that he would meet Waiganjo in a bid to understand the truth about the rot in the police force.

== Police response ==
Rift Valley Provincial Police Officer John M’mbijiwe claimed that Joshua Waiganjo is actually a police reservist in the rank of assistant police commissioner. He indicated that Waiganjo was recruited in 2002 by former Police Commissioner and was introduced to him as the Head of the Kenya Police Reservists Services (KPRS) in Rift Valley when he assumed office. The former Police Commissioner Matthew Iteere however denied having anything to do with Waiganjo.

On 9 January 2013, M’mbijiwe and 2 other officers, Michael Remi Ngugi, the Anti Stock Theft Commandant in Gilgil and the Njoro divisional police chief Peter Njeru Nthiga were suspended over the scandal by the National Police Service Commission. The National Police Service Commission also ordered a headcount of all officers countrywide.

== Hearings ==
It was also confirmed that the hearings would be public. The Commission held its Nairobi hearings at the Kenyatta International Conference Centre after holding initial hearings in Nakuru at the Nakuru Municipal Hall.

=== Testimonies ===
==== Nakuru Hearing ====
Deputy Commandant of Administration of police, Elsebuys Laikuta testified that they never had an officer by the name of Joshua Waiganjo but that Waiganjo was among officers who boarded the chopper that left for Baragoi after 42 officers were killed. Deputy Police Commissioner Francis Musembi Munyambu, who was previously accused of having introduced Waiganjo to the suspended PPO John M'mbijjiwe denied having met him. Zacheus Kotut, a clinical officer at the Anti-Stock Theft Unit (ASTU) Dispensary in Gilgil testified that he gave medical treatment to Waiganjo several times at the request of the ASTU Commandant Remy Ngugi. A driver to Remy Ngugi named Joel Motem, also testified that he had driven Waiganjo to Ngugi’s house many times.

==== Mathew Iteere ====
During his testimony Former Police Commissioner Mathew Iteere blamed former Rift Valley province police boss John M’Mbijiwe and claimed that he never knew Waiganjo. He indicated that the first time he heard about Waiganjo was after he was mentioned in a report as having accompanied M’Mbijiwe to a high level security meeting to Baragoi before the massacre that took place. Iteere further claimed that M’Mbijiwe informed him that Waiganjo was in charge of the Kenya Police Reservists in the province. This he said “mesmerised” him since the reservist units had been disbanded since 2004 by the then police commissioner Maj. General Mohammed Ali.

== Report and Recommendations ==
The team concluded its work on 31 January 2013 and handed over its findings and recommendation to the National Police Service Commission(NPSC)

The following findings were revealed:

- Waiganjo was neither a police officer nor a reservist
- He was close to M’Mbijiwe and Ngugi
- Privy to confidential security information
- No police officer was promoted, dismissed or had disciplinary action taken against them at the instigation of Waiganjo.

The probe recommendations included:

- Dismissal of Rift Valley police boss John M'Mbijiwe and Anti-Stock Theft Unit's Head Remi Ngugi
- Internal Affairs Unit meant to investigate complaints against police officers should be operationalised
- The command and structure be reexamined to ensure power and authority are not concentrated in one office
- Gazetted officers be vetted in future as per Section seven of the National Police Service Act
- An immediate audit of all Kenya Police Reservists and the creation of a database of the same
- Introduction of firearms movement registers for police officers where they do not exist
- Development of comprehensive Kenya Police policy covering recruitment, training, appointment, deployment, remuneration and personnel record management

Former police commissioner Mathew Iteere and Njoro police boss Peter Nthiga were cleared by the probe. Despite recommending Nthiga's reinstatement, the team recommended his transfer to another station.

== Reactions ==
Civil society groups indicated that the scandal would further erode any confidence that the public may have had about the police reforms. They took the position that the report fell far short of what Kenyans were expecting.

== See also ==
- Kenya Police
- National Police Service Commission
- Baragoi Clashes
