= Stephany Hollihan =

Ecuadorian fashion designer (1984–2026)

- Born: Stephany Hollihan Vasconez; 7 September 1984; Guayaquil, Ecuador
- Died: 19 August 2026 (aged 41); Samburu County, Kenya
- Cause of death: Helicopter crash
- Citizenship: Ecuador, United States
- Occupation: Fashion designer
- Years active: 1996–2026
- Known for: Founder and CEO of Sensi Studio
- Spouse: Michele Sensi-Contugi (m. 2008)
- Children: 2

Stephany Hollihan Vasconez (7 September 1984 – 19 August 2026) was an Ecuadorian fashion designer who was the founder and CEO of fashion label Sensi Studio. Hollihan died in a helicopter crash along with her husband, government minister Michele Sensi-Contugi, on 19 August 2026 near Mount Ololokwe in Samburu County, Kenya.

== Early life and career ==
Hollihan was born in Guayaquil, Ecuador on 7 September 1984. She attended high school in Germany before studying in Florence, Italy. She later moved to Milan to study fashion design at the Istituto Marangoni. She married Italian-Ecuadorian government minister Michele Sensi-Contugi on 23 May 2008, and had two children. After completing her studies, she moved back to Ecuador and founded fashion label Sensi Studio in 2010, a fashion and accessories label that built its identity around local craftsmanship and handmade products. She developed the brand into an internationally visible name. The company sells hats, bags, clothing, totes, jewelery, and other accessories.

She was the godmother of the youngest son of President Daniel Noboa and First Lady Lavinia Valbonesi of Ecuador.

== Death ==
Hollihan was among seven people on board Eurocopter EC130 5Y-GYM on a scenic flight from a wildlife conservancy in Loisaba to the Ewaso Ng'iro river. At approximately 9:13, the aircraft crashed in a difficult-to-access section of Mount Ololokwe in Samburu County, Kenya. The helicopter caught on fire and was destroyed. Authorities confirmed all seven occupants were killed on scene.

Ecuador declared three days of national mourning with flags being flown at half-mast for the deaths of Vasconez and her husband. She was 41.
