= Samburu West Constituency =

Kenyan electoral constituency

Samburu West
- constituency for the Parliament of Kenya
- Samburu West Constituency within Samburu County

- Samburu County within Kenya
- County: Samburu
- Population: 164,942 (population of Samburu Central)
- Area: 3,669 km^{2} (1,416.6 sq mi) (area of Samburu Central)

Current constituency
- Number of members: 1
- Party: KANU
- Member of Parliament: Naisula Lesuuda
- Wards: 5

Samburu West is an electoral constituency in Kenya. It is one of three constituencies of Samburu County. The constituency was established for the 1969 elections.

== Members of Parliament ==
Elections	MP	Party	Notes
1969	John Kanite Lenaiyiarra	KANU	One-party system
1974	Paolo Lentano Rurumban	KANU	One-party system
1979	Peter Lekaikum Lititiyo	KANU	One-party system
1983	Peter Lekaikum Lititiyo	KANU	One-party system.
1988	Peter Steve Lengees	KANU	One-party system.
1992	Peter Steve Lengees	KANU	
1997	Peter Steve Lengees	KANU	
2002	Simon Lesirma	KANU	
2007	Simon Lesirma	ODM	
2013	Lati J. Lelelit	URP	
2017	Naisula Lesuuda	KANU	
2022	Naisula Lesuuda	KANU	

== Wards ==
Samburu West constituency has 5 wards: Lodokejek, Suguta Marmar, Loosuk, Poro, and Maralal.

== Registered Voters ==
Registered Voters
Locality	Registered Voters	Local Authority
Biashara	3,100	Maralal town
Lkorroto	782	Maralal town
Milimani	915	Maralal town
Ng'ari	1,563	Maralal town
Shabaa	2,239	Maralal town
Angata Nanyokie	1,319	Samburu County
Arsim	895	Samburu County
Baawa	3,157	Samburu County
Baragoi	1,959	Samburu County
Barsaloi	754	Samburu County
El-barta	1,374	Samburu County
Kawap	1,401	Samburu County
Lodokejek	2,851	Samburu County
Loosuk	2,651	Samburu County
Lpartuk	846	Samburu County
Marti	842	Samburu County
Nachola	1,182	Samburu County
Ndoto	2,533	Samburu County
Nyiro East	1,861	Samburu County
Nyiro West	1,118	Samburu County
Opiroi	1,793	Samburu County
Poro	2,469	Samburu County
Suguta Marmar	3,493	Samburu County
Total	37,550	
*September 2005.
