= José Suárez (broadcaster) =

American businessman (1970–2026)

- Born: José Alberto Suárez; 1970; Miami, Florida, U.S.
- Died: August 19, 2026 (aged 55); Samburu County, Kenya
- Cause of death: Helicopter crash
- Occupation: Broadcaster
- Years active: 2000–2026
- Known for: President and general manager of Telemundo 31, Telemundo 49 and Telemundo 43
- Spouse: Nicole Valle Duarte
- Children: 2

José Alberto Suárez (1970 – August 19, 2026) was an American broadcaster. He was the president and general manager of Telemundo 31, Telemundo 49 and Telemundo 43. He was also the president of several other Telemundo channels, with more than 25 years of media experience. Suárez was among seven people killed in a helicopter crash near Mount Ololokwe in Samburu County, Kenya, on August 19, 2026.

== Background ==
Suárez was born in Miami, Florida in 1970. He began working as a reporter and news anchor for media outlets in Florida, Ohio and Texas. He joined the National Association of Hispanic Journalists in 1998. He spent nearly four years at NBC Miami as director of creative services and programming. During his time in Miami, he also served as executive producer of non-news programming and specials, including daily entertainment shows. Suárez also served as president of multiple Telemundo stations, including Telemundo 33, Telemundo 51, Telemundo 39, Telemundo 20, and Telemundo 60. While living in San Antonio, he served on the Sacramento Hispanic Chamber of Commerce. He and Nicole Valle Duarte had two children together.

== Death ==
Suárez was among five Americans and two others on board Eurocopter EC130 5Y-GYM on a scenic flight from a wildlife conservancy in Loisaba to the Ewaso Ng'iro river. At approximately 9:13, the aircraft crashed in a difficult-to-access section of Mount Ololokwe in Samburu County, Kenya. The helicopter caught on fire and was destroyed. Authorities confirmed all seven occupants were killed on scene. Suárez was 55 years old.

== Awards and honors ==
Suárez received multiple honors, including a Lone Star Emmy for leading Telemundo 60 in 2019, a Suncoast Emmy, three Emmys for Best Daily Newscast, the LGBTQ+ Business Award in 2021 and several Associated Press awards.
