= Naisula Lesuuda =

Kenyan politician and women's rights activist

Hon. Naisula Lesuuda
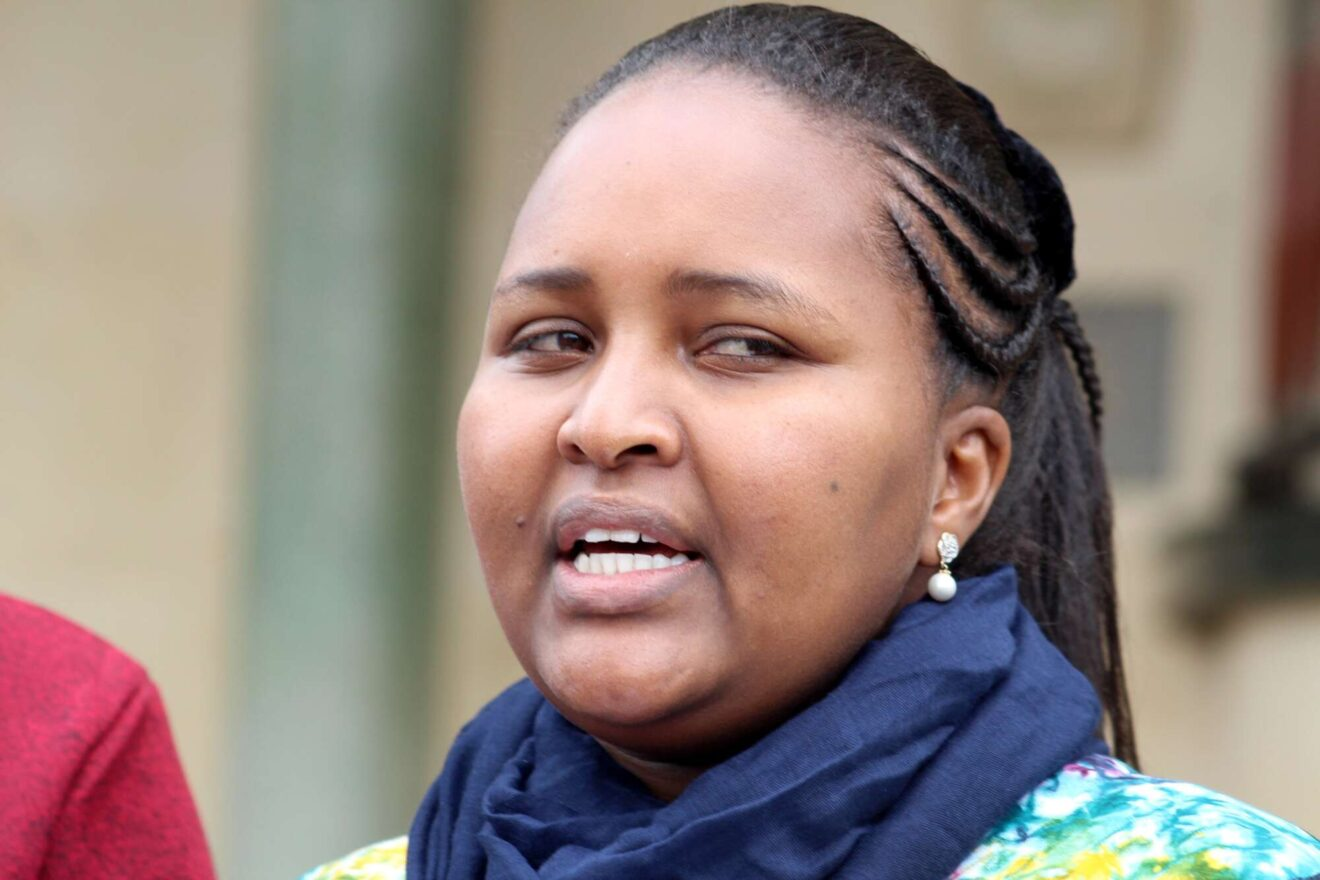

Member of Parliament for Samburu West constituency
- Incumbent
- Assumed office 2017
- Preceded by: Jonathan Lelelit

Personal details
- Born: 30 April 1984 (age 42) Samburu
- Citizenship: Kenyan
- Party: Kenya African National Union (KANU)
- Children: 2
- Education: Degree in Communications and Community Development
- Alma mater: Daystar University
- Occupation: Politician, activist, journalist
- Known for: Peace advocacy, women's rights, anti-FGM campaigns
- Awards: Presidential Order of the Grand Warrior (2010); ILO Wedge Award for Outstanding Professional Woman (2011); One Young World Awards (Top five, 2018)

Naisula Josephine Lesuuda (born 30 April 1984) is a Kenyan politician and women's rights activist. She is a Member of the Parliament of Kenya.

== Early life and education ==
Lesuuda was born in Samburu on 30 April 1984, the first of three children born to an Anglican bishop and a businesswoman. She graduated from Daystar University with a degree in communications and community development.

== Career ==
Lesuuda worked as a journalist at the Kenya Broadcasting Corporation, including hosting Good Morning Kenya. In 2009, after ten people were killed in cattle rustling in Laikipia, she became a founding member of the Laikipia Peace Caravan. This in turn led to the founding of a number of other local peace organisations, supported by the Kenya government and USAid. In 2010, her work with this organisation led to her becoming the youngest Kenyan woman to win the presidential Order of the Grand Warrior.

In 2013, Lesuuda left her job to found the Naisula Lesuuda Peace Foundation which advocates for the education of girls and for the eradication of female genital mutilation and child marriage.

Lesuuda participated in President Uhuru Kenyatta's campaign in 2013, and was then nominated on his TNA party ticket to represent Samburu County in the Senate in 2013, becoming its youngest female member. She was then elected Vice Chair of the Kenyan Women's Parliamentary Association.

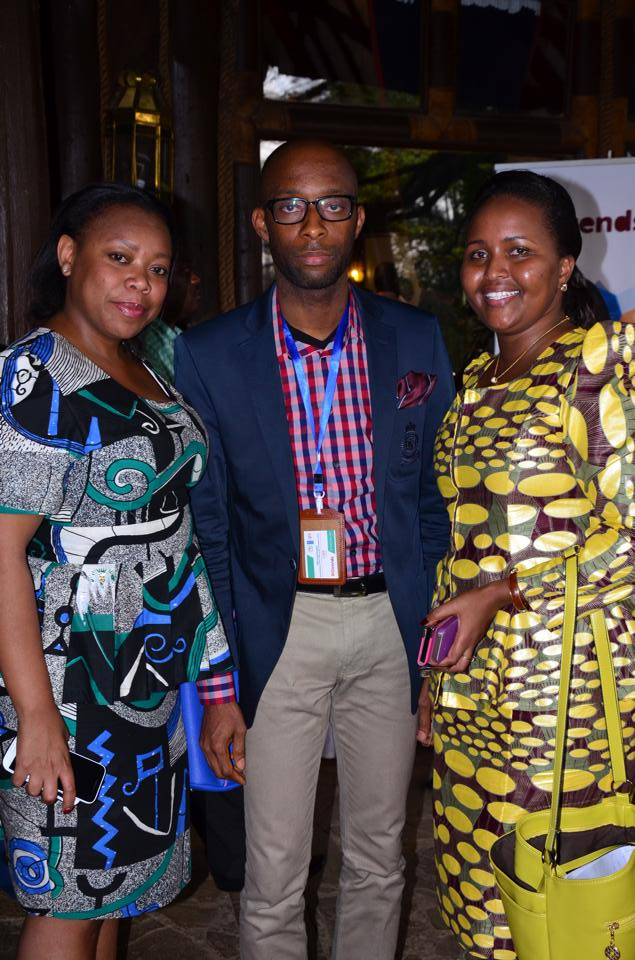
Naisula Lesuuda (R) with Onofiok Luke, a lawyer and legislator, and with Kenyan Ambassador to Somalia, Yvonne Khamati (L), on the final day of the African Union Youth Pre-forum in Nairobi in 2014.

In 2016, she announced that she would leave the Senate to seek election as a member of the National Assembly for Samburu West, then in 2017 switching from the Jubilee to KANU party. She has maintained her support for Kenyatta.

At the 2017 election, Lesuuda was elected with 14,560 votes, defeating incumbent Jonathan Lelelit who received 13,970 votes, becoming the first female member of parliament for the Samburu West constituency. She was one of several women MPs who were the only women elected in their county. The others included Mary Emaase in Busia County, Mary Maingi in Kirinyaga County and Mishi Mboko in Mombasa.

When parliament sat in August 2017, she announced her intention to apply for the position of Deputy Speaker, but failed to submit her application before the vote.

She was re-elected in Samburu West Constituency at the 2022 general election.

== Awards and honours ==
- Presidential Order of the Grand Warrior for her journalistic work highlighting social issues and promoting peace, 2010
- International Labour Organization Wedge Award for Outstanding Professional Woman, 2011
- Top five winner of the 2018 inaugural One Young World Awards.

== Personal life ==
Lesuuda is married and has 2 daughters.

== See also ==
- 13th Parliament of Kenya
- Feminism in Kenya
- Hanifa Adan
- Ida Odinga
