= Kisima Airport =

- IATA: n/a; ICAO: HKMI

Summary
- Airport type: Public, Civilian
- Owner: Kenya Airports Authority
- Serves: Maralal
- Location: Kisima, Kenya
- Elevation AMSL: 5,942 ft / 1,811 m
- Coordinates: 00°57′00″N 36°48′00″E

Map
- Location of Kisima Airport in Kenya; Placement on map is approximate

Runways
Direction	Length		Surface
Direction	ft	m	Surface
10/28	3,000	900	Unpaved

Kisima Airport is an airport in Kenya.

== Location ==
Kisima Airport (IATA: n/a, ICAO: HKMI) is located in Kisima, a village in Samburu County in northwestern Kenya, near the town of Maralal, in the eastern part of the Loroghi Plateau.

By air, Kisima Airport is situated approximately 201 kilometres (125 mi), by air, north of Nairobi International Airport, Kenya's largest civilian airport. The approximate geographic coordinates of this airport are:0° 57' 0.00"N, 36° 48' 0.00"E (Latitude:0.9500; Longitude:36.8000).

== Overview ==
Kisima Airport is a small civilian airport, serving the village of Kisima and the neighboring town of Maralal. Situated at 5,942 feet (1,811 m) above sea level, the airport has a single unpaved runway measuring 3,000 feet (910 m) in length.

== Airlines and destinations ==
None at the moment.

== See also ==
- Kenya Airports Authority
- Kenya Civil Aviation Authority
- List of airports in Kenya
