= Mount Ololokwe =

Mountain in Kenya

- Ol Donyo Sabache
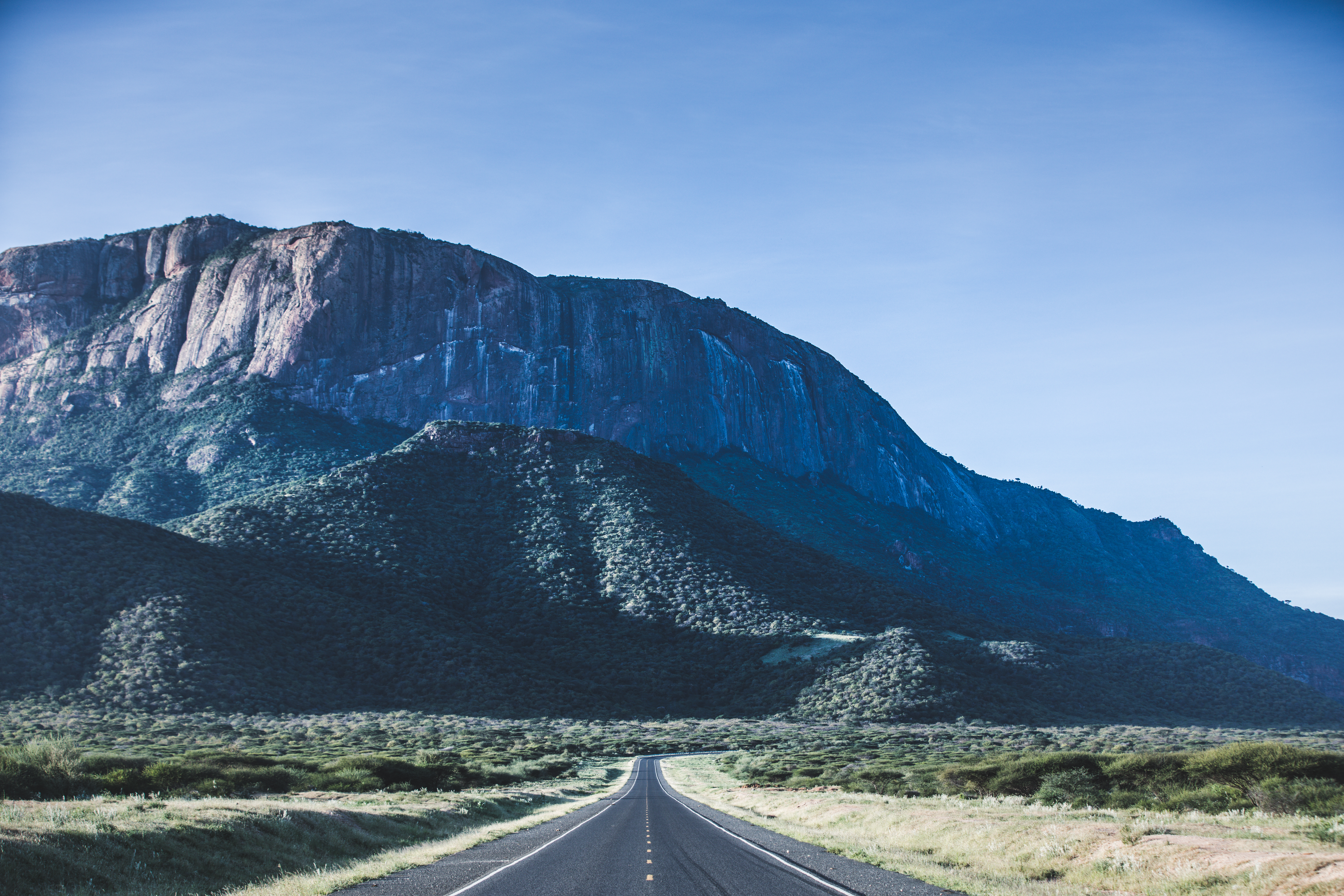
- Mount Ololokwe in 2020

Highest point
- Elevation: 1,970 m (6,460 ft)
- Coordinates: 0°51′0″N 37°31′30″E

Geography
- Location: Samburu County, Kenya

Mount Ololokwe, also known as Ol Donyo Sabache, is a mountain in Samburu County, northern Kenya. Rising to approximately 2,000 metres (6,600 ft) above sea level, it is a prominent isolated, flat-topped mountain above the surrounding semi-arid plains. The mountain is considered sacred by the Samburu people, who have used it as a shrine for prayers and rituals. It is also a destination for hiking and trekking.

Although widely referred to as Mount Ololokwe, the mountain is properly known as Ol Donyo Sabache, while Ololokwe is a name referring to the surrounding area that has also come to be widely applied to the mountain itself. Ololokwe means "wide head" in the Samburu language, a reference to the mountain's broad, rounded upper profile. Ol Donyo is a generic reference to a mountain name, and Sabache refers to the clasp of a traditional Samburu woman's necklace, with the mountain and two smaller neighboring peaks forming a horseshoe-shaped arrangement around the intervening valley.

On 19 August 2026, a Eurocopter EC130 B4 operated by Lady Lori Helicopters crashed in the foothills of Mount Ololokwe while carrying tourists on a charter flight. All six passengers and the Kenyan pilot were killed.
