= 2026 Mount Ololokwe helicopter crash =

Fatal helicopter crash in Kenya

- 5Y-GYM, the Eurocopter EC130B4 helicopter involved in the accident, pictured in 2014

Accident
- Date: 19 August 2026
- Summary: Under investigation
- Site: Near Mount Ololokwe, Samburu County, Kenya; 0°49′30″N 37°32′24″E

Aircraft
- Aircraft type: Eurocopter EC130 B4
- Operator: Lady Lori Helicopters, operating for &Beyond Safaris
- Registration: 5Y-GYM
- Flight origin: Loisaba Conservancy, Kenya
- Destination: Ewaso Ng'iro, Kenya
- Occupants: 7
- Passengers: 6
- Crew: 1
- Fatalities: 7
- Survivors: 0

On 19 August 2026, a Eurocopter EC130 B4 helicopter crashed near Mount Ololokwe in Samburu County, central Kenya, killing all seven people on board, including Ecuador's intelligence chief Michele Sensi-Contugi, his wife Stephany Hollihan and a group of four other American citizens from South Florida. The helicopter, operated by Lady Lori Helicopters, was carrying passengers on a charter flight from Loisaba Conservancy toward the Ewaso Ng'iro area when it crashed at approximately 9:13 a.m. local time.

Among the South Florida victims were José Alberto Suárez, president and general manager of three Telemundo-owned television stations in Florida, Miami restaurateur Roger Edward Duarte, real estate executive Adam Hlavaty, and software executive Henry Parra. Five of the seven people killed were American citizens, including Hollihan.

The Kenya Civil Aviation Authority confirmed the crash and announced that the Air Accident Investigation Department of Kenya's Ministry of Roads and Transport had begun an investigation. The cause of the crash was not immediately known. This was the second deadly helicopter crash of this scale in Kenya in 2026, with another fatal helicopter accident in Nandi County in February 2026 having killed six people, including MP Johana Ng'eno. The February crash had also involved a Eurocopter helicopter.

== Flight and crash ==
The aircraft was a single-engine Eurocopter EC130 B4 operated by Nairobi-based Lady Lori Helicopters. It was carrying guests of luxury travel company &Beyond on a charter flight. They had been flying to the Ewaso Ng'iro river.

According to the Kenya Civil Aviation Authority (KCAA), the flight was traveling from Loisaba Conservancy toward the Ewaso Nyiro area when it crashed at 9:13 a.m., local time. The aviation authority and operator described the itinerary of the tourists as taking a flight from Suyian Conservancy to Mount Ololokwe. The crash occurred in rugged terrain in the foothills of Mount Ololokwe, a prominent mountain and tourist destination in northern Kenya. The Kenya Red Cross reported that difficult terrain and a fire at the crash site hampered search and recovery efforts. Tropic Air Kenya dispatched two helicopters to assist the response.

== Victims ==
Josh Outram, the pilot, was a fourth-generation Kenyan, and an experienced helicopter pilot, who had worked in both commercial aviation and wildlife conservation. He was the founder and director of African Heli Adventures, with more than 15 years of flying experience in Kenya. He had also participated in aerial conservation work in Kenya.

Michele Sensi-Contugi Ycaza, 44, was born in Desio, Italy, to a family historically from Volterra; Sensi-Contugi's father was Italian and his mother was Ecuadorian. His wife, Stephany Hollihan Vásconez, 42, was an Ecuadorian fashion designer, and held both Ecuadorian and American citizenship. She was the founder and creative director of Sensi Studio, a fashion and accessories company based in Guayaquil, with products handcrafted by Ecuadorian artisans. In response to their deaths, Ecuadorian President Daniel Noboa declared three days of national mourning and ordered a state funeral.

José Alberto Suárez, 55, was a Florida-born journalist and television executive from Coral Gables. He was president and general manager of three Telemundo-owned television operations serving Orlando, Tampa, and Fort Myers–Naples. Suárez had more than 25 years of experience in television, having spent 18 years with Telemundo and NBC stations. He had previously headed Telemundo stations in several other markets, and had worked as a reporter and news anchor in Florida, Ohio, and Texas. During his career he received several television journalism awards, including Lone Star and Suncoast Emmy Awards. A joint statement mourning Suárez was released by NBCUniversal News Group chairman Cesar Conde, NBCUniversal Local chairman Valari Staab, and Telemundo Station Group president José Cancela, describing the commitment of Suárez to the stations and to the communities he served.

Roger E. Duarte, 42, was a Miami-area restaurateur and entrepreneur who founded seafood company George Stone Crab, co-founded the restaurant chain My Ceviche, and was associated with Hospitality Capital Partners. His family described him as a husband and father and issued a statement following his death.

Adam Hlavaty, 42, and Henry Parra, 55, were a married couple. Hlavaty, a real estate executive and vice president of development for Benihana, also served on the board of the Coral Gables Museum; while Parra was a software executive and co-founder of Trax USA, a Coral Gables-based aviation maintenance software company . Hlavaty and Parra lived in Coral Gables, and friends described the couple as avid travelers who were active in their community.

== Investigation ==
The Kenya Civil Aviation Authority confirmed the accident, and the Air Accident Investigation Department (AAID) of Kenya's Ministry of Roads and Transport opened an investigation. It was reported that aviation experts from the United States National Transportation Safety Board (NTSB) and France's Bureau of Enquiry and Analysis for Civil Aviation Safety (BEA) would work with the Kenya Civil Aviation Authority to investigate the reasons for the crash. The AAID further reported that rugged terrain and the extensive post-impact fire complicated the recovery and preservation of evidence, therefore deciding that all recoverable wreckage would be transported to Nairobi for further examination.

France became involved due to being country where the helicopter was designed and manufactured. The United States became involved due to the five U.S. citizens killed in the crash. The BEA initially classified the occurrence as a collision with terrain during a commercial sightseeing flight followed by a post-impact fire.

On 18 September 2026, Kenya's Air Accident Investigation Department (AAID) released its preliminary report finding that as the helicopter was conducting a low-level sightseeing flight close to the cliff face of Mount Ololokwe, a landing-gear skid struck a protruding rock formation near the summit. The helicopter then descended the mountainside, went over a cliff, and was destroyed by the impact and the post-crash fire. The AAID said that continued investigation was needed to determine the probable cause and contributing factors, including the circumstances of the low-level flight.
