= Moses Kasaine =

Kenyan politician

Moses Lenolkula Kasaine (born 1976) is a Kenyan politician. He is the governor of Samburu County, Kenya. He has three children and a wife.
