= Michele Sensi-Contugi =

Italian-born Ecuadorian government minister (1982–2026)

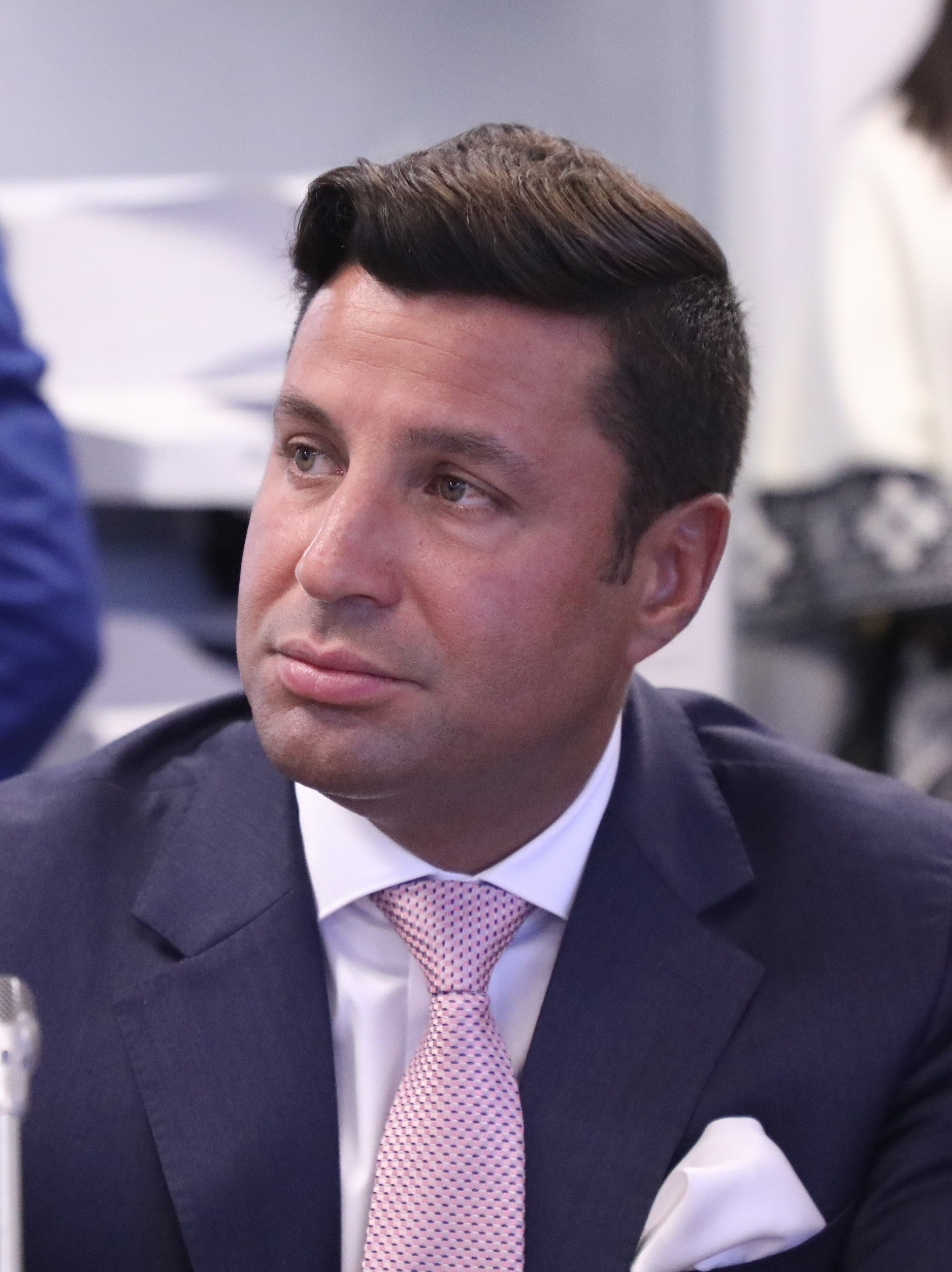
- Sensi-Contugi in 2025
- Born: Michele Sensi-Contugi Ycaza; 12 August 1982; Desio, Italy
- Died: 19 August 2026 (aged 44); Samburu County, Kenya
- Citizenship: Ecuador, Italy
- Education: Nova Southeastern University
- Spouse: Stephany Hollihan Vasconez (m. 2008)

Michele Sensi-Contugi Ycaza (Note: In this name that follows Hispanic American naming customs, the first or paternal surname is Sensi-Contugi and the second or maternal family name is Ycaza.) (12 August 1982 – 19 August 2026) was an Italian-Ecuadorian businessman and intelligence official. A friend and advisor to Ecuadorian president Daniel Noboa, he contributed to Noboa's 2023 election campaign; upon Noboa's election to the presidency, he appointed Sensi-Contugi as the head of the country's national intelligence agency, made him Noboa's delegate to multiple corporations, including Petroecuador, and added him to the boards of the Corporación Eléctrica del Ecuador, Corporación Nacional de Electricidad, and Flota Petrolera Ecuatoriana. From April to August 2024, Sensi-Contugi worked as the Minister of Government. He was also the vice president of the National Democratic Action party.

On 19 August 2026, Sensi-Contugi and his wife, Stephany Hollihan Vasconez, died in a helicopter crash in Kenya. In response, Noboa ordered three days of national mourning and a state funeral for Sensi-Contugi.

== Education and career ==
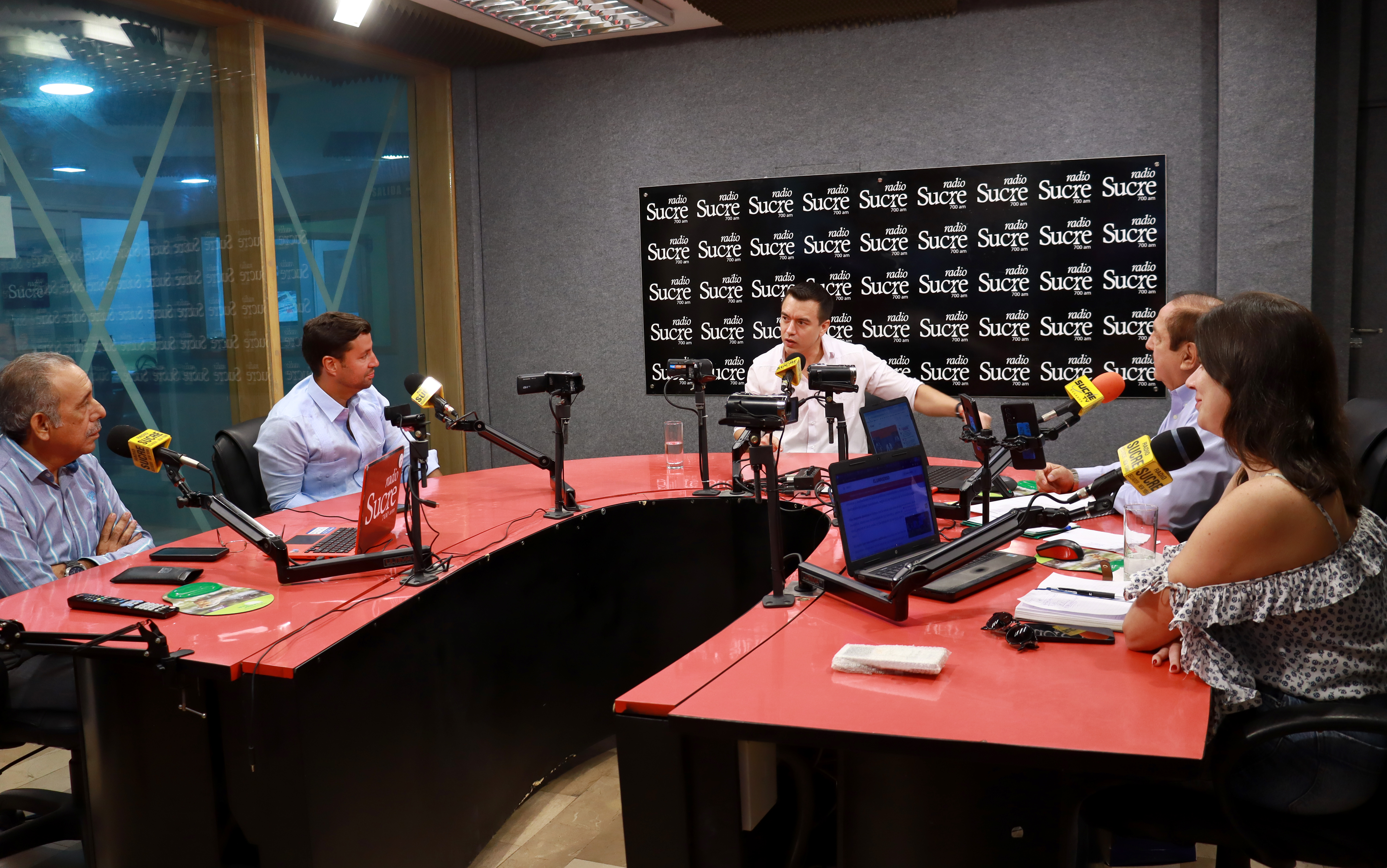
Daniel Noboa, Irene Vélez Torres, and Michele Sensi-Contugi speaking at Radio Sucre, in Guayaquil, in July 2024

Sensi-Contugi attended Nova Southeastern University in Florida, the United States, where he earned a master's in business administration. His degrees were not registered with the SENESCYT agency in Ecuador.

A private man, Sensi-Contugi worked in rubber and plastic-related businesses in Guayaquil and was a manager at Senco S.A.; he also owned multiple companies. He was a close friend and advisor of President Daniel Noboa; the National Electoral Council reported that he donated $25,000 to Noboa's 2023 election campaign. After Noboa's election to the presidency, he appointed Sensi-Contugi as general director of the national intelligence agency (Centro de Inteligencia Estratégica, CIES), replacing Fausto Cobo. Over the next several months, Noboa also appointed Sensi-Contugi as his delegate to the Astilleros Navales Ecuatorianos (Ecuadorian Naval Shipyards), Santa Bárbara, and Petroecuador, and made him a permanent representative on the boards of the Ecuadorian Electric Corporation, Corporación Nacional de Electricidad, and Flota Petrolera Ecuatoriana. In April, Noboa appointed him as the country's Minister of Government, succeeding Mónica Palencia. The next month, he also became the vice president of the Noboa-associated National Democratic Action party.

He left the Minister of Government position in August 2024 and was succeeded by Arturo Félix Wong.

In February 2025, Sensi-Contugi was called before a private hearing before the National Assembly over allegations he and the intelligence agency had used the Pegasus spyware against opposition politicians, journalists, and activists. The following June, Noboa eliminated the CIES and replaced it with a new intelligence agency, the Centro Nacional de Inteligencia (National Intelligence Center, CNI); Sensi-Contugi remained director of the organization. Former president Rafael Correa was critical of Sensi-Contugi's role in the Ecuadorean government, referring to him as "the evil mastermind behind Noboa's government" and accusing him of spying and organizing troll farms.

Upon his death, he was succeeded as head of the CNI by Luis Carlos Ávila Chávez.

== Personal life and death ==
Michele Sensi-Contugi Ycaza was born on 12 August 1982, in Desio, Italy, to a family historically from Volterra; Sensi-Contugi's father was Italian and his mother was Ecuadorian. He married Stephany Hollihan Vasconez, a fashion designer, on 23 May 2008; the couple had two children who were both minors at the time of their parents' deaths. His wife was the godmother of the youngest son of President Daniel Noboa and First Lady Lavinia Valbonesi of Ecuador.

On 19 August 2026, a week after his 44th birthday, Sensi-Contugi, along with his wife, was killed in a helicopter crash on Mount Ololokwe in Samburu County, Kenya. They had been flying to the Ewaso Ng'iro river. In response, Noboa declared three days of national mourning, ordered a state funeral, and signed an executive decree giving the couples' two children police protection. Noboa also curtailed his in-progress official tour of China, Singapore, and Vietnam, announcing he would return to Ecuador to attend Sensi-Contugi's funeral.
