= Baragoi clashes =

| Date | November 2012 |
| Location | Baragoi, Kenya |
| Status | Inconclusive |

Belligerents
| Turkana tribe | Samburu tribe |

Casualties and losses
- 46 dead

In November 2012, a series of ethnic clashes between the Samburu and Turkana tribes of Kenya's Samburu County resulted in the deaths of at least 46 people including police officers sent to quell the violence.

== Cause of conflict ==
Tribal rivalry and fighting over cattle has been cited as the primary cause of the conflict.

== Major incidents ==
=== November ===
In November 2012 over 40 Kenya Police officers and reservists were killed in the Suguta Valley near Baragoi while on a mission to recover stolen cattle.

=== December ===
Four people were killed and several others injured in renewed cattle raids. This incident took place in Kewab in Baragoi when the Turkana and Samburu tribes.

== Government response ==
As a result of the November incident, the Kenyan Parliamentary Committee on Security sent a team to probe the clashes.

== See also ==
- Crime in Kenya
- Ethnic Conflicts in Kenya
- Ethnic conflict
