= 2023 Gold Coast mid-air collision =

Helicopter collision in Queensland, Australia

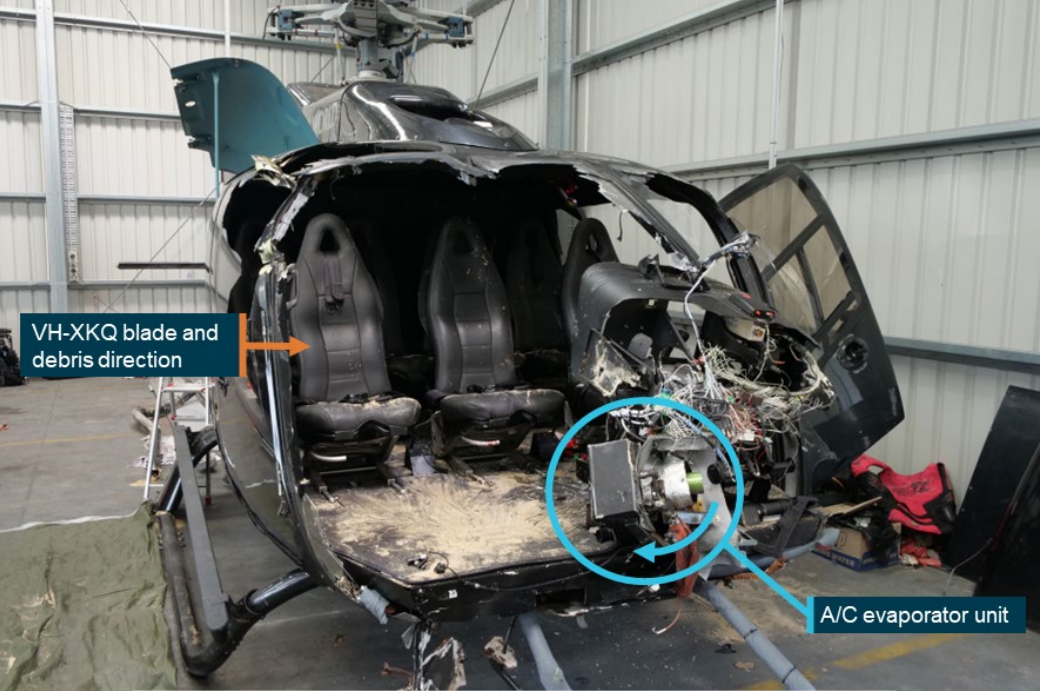
- The aftermath of VH-XH9

Occurrence
- Date: 2 January 2023; 3 years ago, 1:59 pm AEST
- Summary: Mid-air collision due to faulty radio
- Site: Gold Coast Seaway, Queensland, Australia; 27°57′41″S 153°25′23″E
- Total fatalities: 4
- Total injuries: 8
- Total survivors: 9

First aircraft
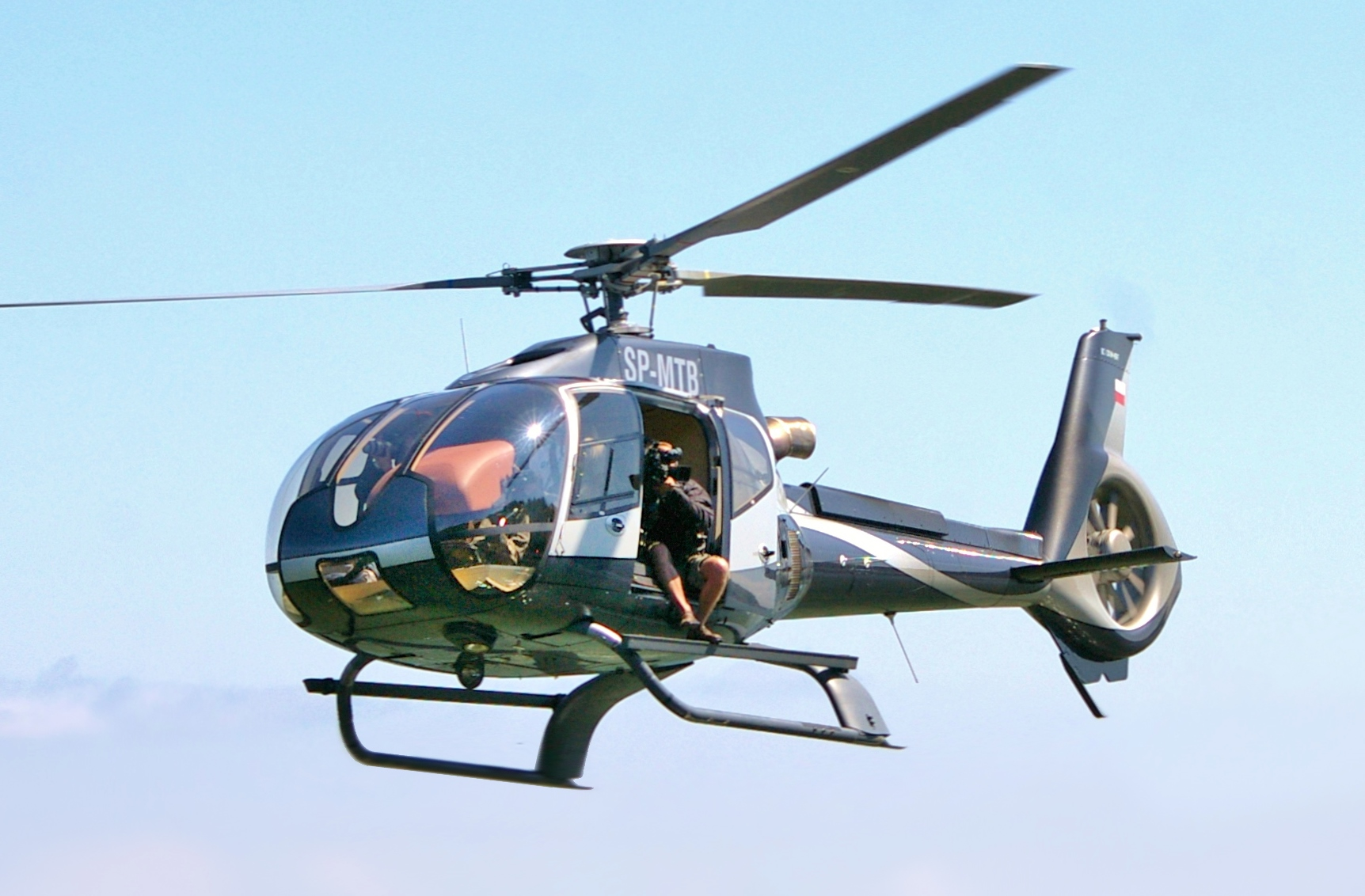
- A Eurocopter EC130 similar to the two helicopters involved in the collision
- Type: Eurocopter EC130
- Operator: Sea World Helicopters Pty Ltd
- Registration: VH-XH9
- Flight origin: Sea World, Queensland, Australia
- Destination: Sea World, Queensland, Australia
- Occupants: 6
- Passengers: 5
- Crew: 1
- Fatalities: 0
- Injuries: 5
- Survivors: 6

Second aircraft
- Type: Eurocopter EC130
- Operator: Sea World Helicopters Pty Ltd
- Registration: VH-XKQ
- Flight origin: Sea World, Queensland, Australia
- Destination: Sea World, Queensland, Australia
- Occupants: 7
- Passengers: 6
- Crew: 1
- Fatalities: 4
- Injuries: 3
- Survivors: 3

On 2 January 2023, two Eurocopter EC130s collided mid-air and crashed near Sea World theme park in the city of Gold Coast, Queensland, Australia. The collision killed four people and injured eight, three critically.

== Collision ==
On 2 January 2023, at approximately 13:59 AEST, two helicopters operated by Sea World Helicopters collided mid-air at about 130 feet above ground' whilst one was attempting to land and the other departing from a helipad at Sea World theme park. Both helicopters were undertaking tourist trips for park-goers along the Gold Coast Broadwater, although the operator is not associated with the theme park.

Less than a minute after take-off, the departing helicopter (VH-XKQ) collided with the arriving helicopter (VH-XH9). This resulted in the departing helicopter's main rotor blades and gearbox separating, causing the helicopter to crash on a sandbar, killing four on board including the pilot, Ashley Jenkinson, and leaving three in critical condition.

The other victims were 36 year old Vanessa Tadros and United Kingdom couple Diane, 67 and Ron Hughes, 65. Vanessa's 10 year old son, Nicholas, and a mother and son, 33 year old Winnie and 9 year old Leon De Silva, survived. The arriving helicopter, rode by pilot Michael James, was able to stabilize itself after the collision and successfully perform an emergency landing on the same sandbar with substantial damage. All six on board survived without critical injury; this includes James, Jessie Maya, and four people from New Zealand: Elmarie and Riann Steenberg, and Edward and Marle Swart. Five of the six survivors on the arriving helicopter suffering minor glass shrapnel wounds from the shattered cockpit windshield. All nine survivors were taken to hospital for further treatment: eight were transported to Gold Coast University Hospital and one was transported to Queensland Children's Hospital. Of the three critically injured, all survived, though some with life changing injuries. Ten-year old Nicholas Tadros had multiple severe injuries, ultimately resulting in his leg being amputated; Winnie had several broken bones, and her 9 year old son Leon De Silva suffered from head injuries.

Many members of the public witnessed the collision, with beachgoers, boaters, and nearby police attending the scene to provide first aid and free injured passengers from the helicopter.

Sea World Helicopters Pty Ltd, the operator of the two helicopters involved, temporarily closed after the incident but has since resumed operations.

== Investigation ==
Queensland Police and the Australian Transport Safety Bureau (ATSB) investigated the collision. Investigators from ATSB offices in Brisbane and Canberra arrived the following day, removed both aircraft from the sandbar and retrieved electronic recording equipment.

External videos
- Footage from inside the arriving helicopter

A video of the arriving helicopter recorded by a passenger, which was aired by Seven News, shows a passenger pointing at the departing helicopter, tapping pilot Michael James on his shoulder and grabbing hold of his seat seconds before the collision. Footage from three lipstick cameras attached to the departing helicopter was examined by the ATSB.

=== Final report ===
On 9 April 2025, the final report of the collision was released by the ATSB. The report found that the radio on the VH-XKQ, the departing helicopter, was faulty due to corrosion, and in the previous 2 days the vast majority of transmissions had failed. This meant the arriving pilot did not receive the take-off call; it's possible the departing pilot also did not receive the arriving call. Additional contributory safety issues were attributed to Sea World Helicopters' operations and management, including a lax safety culture which meant that 5 previous near misses in the weeks leading up to the crash had been ignored. Pilot error was not found to be a factor. At the time of publication, 4 of 11 safety issues identified by the ATSB as contributing to the accident had not yet been addressed.

=== Inquest and lawsuits ===
An coroner's inquest took place in November 2025 into the deaths. In December of 2025, critically injured survivor Winnie filed a lawsuits against multiple parties on behalf of herself and her son. A lawsuit for wrongful death of the pilot Ashley Jenkinson against the Sea World Helicopters Pty Ltd was settled out of court in November 2025; the beneficiaries were his fiancée and their son.

== See also ==
- List of accidents and incidents involving helicopters
- List of civilian mid-air collisions
- 2015 Villa Castelli mid-air collision
