= Kisima =

- Village
- Location in Kenya
- Coordinates: 0.94742°N 36.76577°E
- Country: Kenya
- County: Samburu County
- Time zone: UTC+3 (EAT)

Kisima is a small village in Samburu County in northwestern Kenya, southeast of the town of Maralal. It lies next to Lake Kisima in the eastern part of the Loroghi Plateau. The village is most notable as the location of Kisima Airport, which serves both Kisima and Maralal.

The President of Kenya launched work on the paved Naibor - Kisima - Maralal road in July 2017.
