= Simon Lesirma =

Kenyan politician

Simon Lesirma is a Kenyan politician. He belongs to the Orange Democratic Movement and was elected to represent the Samburu West Constituency in the National Assembly of Kenya since the 2007 Kenyan general election.
