= Samburu North Constituency =

Electoral constituency in Kenya

Samburu North
- constituency for the Parliament of Kenya
- Samburu North Constituency within Samburu County

- Samburu County within Kenya
- County: Samburu
- Population: 67,391
- Area: 7,375 km^{2} (2,847.5 sq mi)

Current constituency
- Number of members: 1
- Party: UDA
- Member of Parliament: Dominic Eli Letipila
- Wards: 6

Samburu North is a constituency in Kenya. It is one of three constituencies in Samburu County.
