= Eurocopter EC130 =

Single-engine light helicopter

EC130 H130
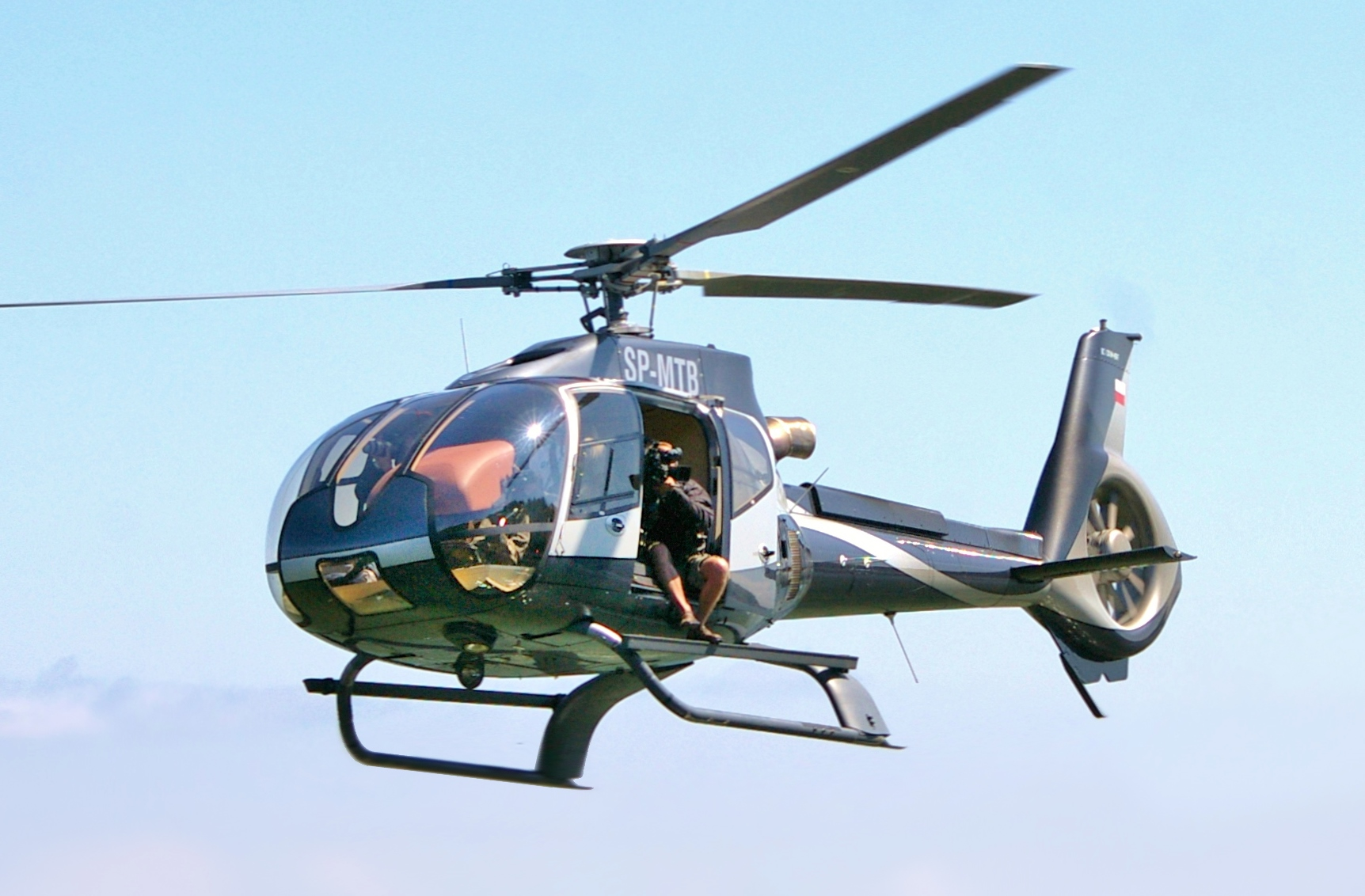
- EC130 B4 in flight

General information
- Type: Light utility helicopter
- National origin: France; Germany; Europe
- Manufacturer: Eurocopter; Airbus Helicopters
- Status: In production
- Number built: 1000

History
- Manufactured: 1999–present
- Introduction date: 2001
- First flight: 24 June 1999
- Developed from: Eurocopter AS350 Écureuil

The Airbus Helicopters H130 (formerly Eurocopter EC130) is a single engine light utility helicopter developed from the earlier Eurocopter AS350 Écureuil, one of the primary changes from which was the adoption of a Fenestron anti-torque device in place of a conventional tail rotor. It was launched and produced by the Eurocopter Group, which would later be rebranded as Airbus Helicopters.

== Development ==
During the 1980s, there was considerable interest within French aerospace manufacturer Aerospatiale to further develop their AS350 series Écureuil rotorcraft, which had been originally developed in the early 1970s. On 6 February 1987, a prototype AS350 Z (a modified AS350) conducted its first flight with a Fenestron tail-rotor fitted in the place of its conventional counterpart. The AS350 Z test program stretched across several years, the aircraft receiving additional modifications such as a new air intake based on that of the Eurocopter EC120. The AS350 Z contributed to the overall development of the fenestron tail rotor.

In the early 1990s, development of the new rotorcraft continued under Eurocopter, Aerospatiale having merged into the multinational Eurocopter organisation. On 24 June 1999, the first prototype EC130 performed its first flight, flown from an airfield in France by Steven Page, an Australian test pilot. Major changes from the preceding AS350 included the adoption of a dual-hydraulic system, the enclosed Fenestron anti-torque device, and a wide main body to provide a cabin with considerably greater internal space.

The EC130 was designed in close cooperation with tour operators, one such operator, Blue Hawaiian Helicopters, being the launch operator; it has been described as having a spacious cabin for accommodating up to seven tourists and providing excellent external visibility. In 2001, the EC130 entered service with Blue Hawaiian Helicopters, used for aerial tours of scenic areas such as Hawaii and the Grand Canyon. The EC130 is principally aimed at commercial passenger transportation operators, such as aerial tour companies, whereas the preceding AS350 continued to be produced and marketed for utility operations.

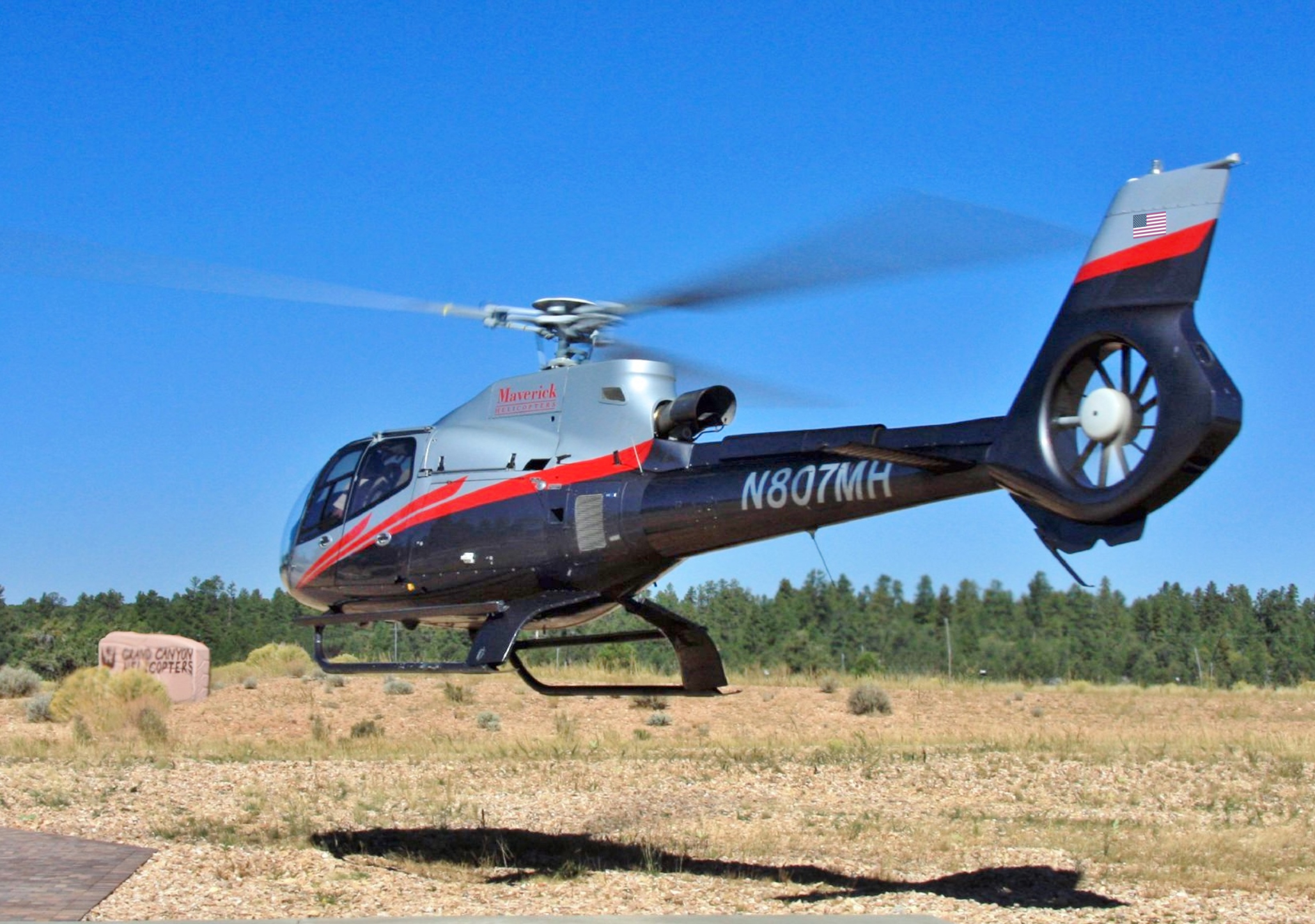
A Maverick EC130

Vertical Magazine described the EC130 as being "one of the most successful single engine helicopters in air medical service".

In February 2012, Eurocopter formally unveiled the EC130 T2, an upgraded variant of the EC130 featuring the more powerful Turbomeca Arriel 2D turboshaft engine. Improving the base model's performance; more than 70% of the EC130 T2's airframe differed from the initial EC130 model, changes to improve passenger comfort such as active vibration control and better air conditioning were adopted, while fuel consumption is claimed to be 14% lower. In 2012, Eurocopter received orders for 50 EC130 T2 from Maverick Helicopters, and other customers such as Papillon and Blue Hawaiian took the total then on order for the new variant to 105.

The EC130 T2 entered service in 2012. In 2013, Airbus Helicopters reported that a production rate of 50 EC130 T2s would be produced that year, and that this was expected to rise to 65 per year in 2014. In August 2013, Airbus Helicopter's Brazilian subsidiary Helibras assembled its first EC130 T2; the first Australian-assembled EC130 T2 followed in December 2013.

In 2021, Airbus tested a hybrid electric assist in an H130 to extend reaction time up to 30 seconds during transition to autorotation after engine failure.

On 9 April 2025, Airbus signed a contract with Mahindra Aerostructures through which the latter will produce the main fuselage assembly of the H130 helicopter in India. The first fuselage is scheduled to be delivered to Airbus Helicopters’ facilities in Europe in March 2027.

== Design ==
The EC130 is a single-engine helicopter. It uses a three-bladed Starflex main rotor which is matched to an enclosed tail fan anti-torque device, known as a Fenestron, the latter feature replacing the traditional tail rotor found on the older AS350. The Fenestron has unevenly spaced blades to reduce noise generation by 50% compared to a conventional tail rotor; this enabled an FAA Appendix H fly-over noise signature of 84.3 EPNdB, 8.5 dB below stage two limits. The EC130 uses the Turbomeca Arriel 2D turboshaft engine; the performance of this powerplant has led to the type having been described as possessing "better power margins and range than competing models, particularly in hot and high conditions". The EC130 T2's enhanced Arriel engine is equipped with Full Authority Digital Engine Controls; a dual hydraulic system derived from the Eurocopter AS355 was also adopted.

The EC130 was designed with various avionics and safety features, including flight data recorders, crash-worthy seats, and redundant flight systems for greater reliability; the EC130 T2 had further safety features installed. Vertical Magazine described the cockpit instrumentation as being "straightforward" and the control response as "tight and pleasant". Piloting aids such as the Vehicle and Engine Multifunction Display (VEMD) is claimed to reduced pilot workload, thereby increasing ease-of-use and overall safety. Dependent on customer demand and role, tactical instrumentation and equipment consoles may also be installed in the cockpit. Typically the cockpit is configured for single pilot operations, the pilot being seated on the left-hand side of the forward cabin to reduce the risk of passenger interference with the controls posed by a right-hand position; dual controls can be optionally installed. The EC130 is equipped with integrated visual flight rules (VFR) equipment coupled to a Global Positioning System (GPS) receiver, making it readily capable of flight under both day and night conditions.

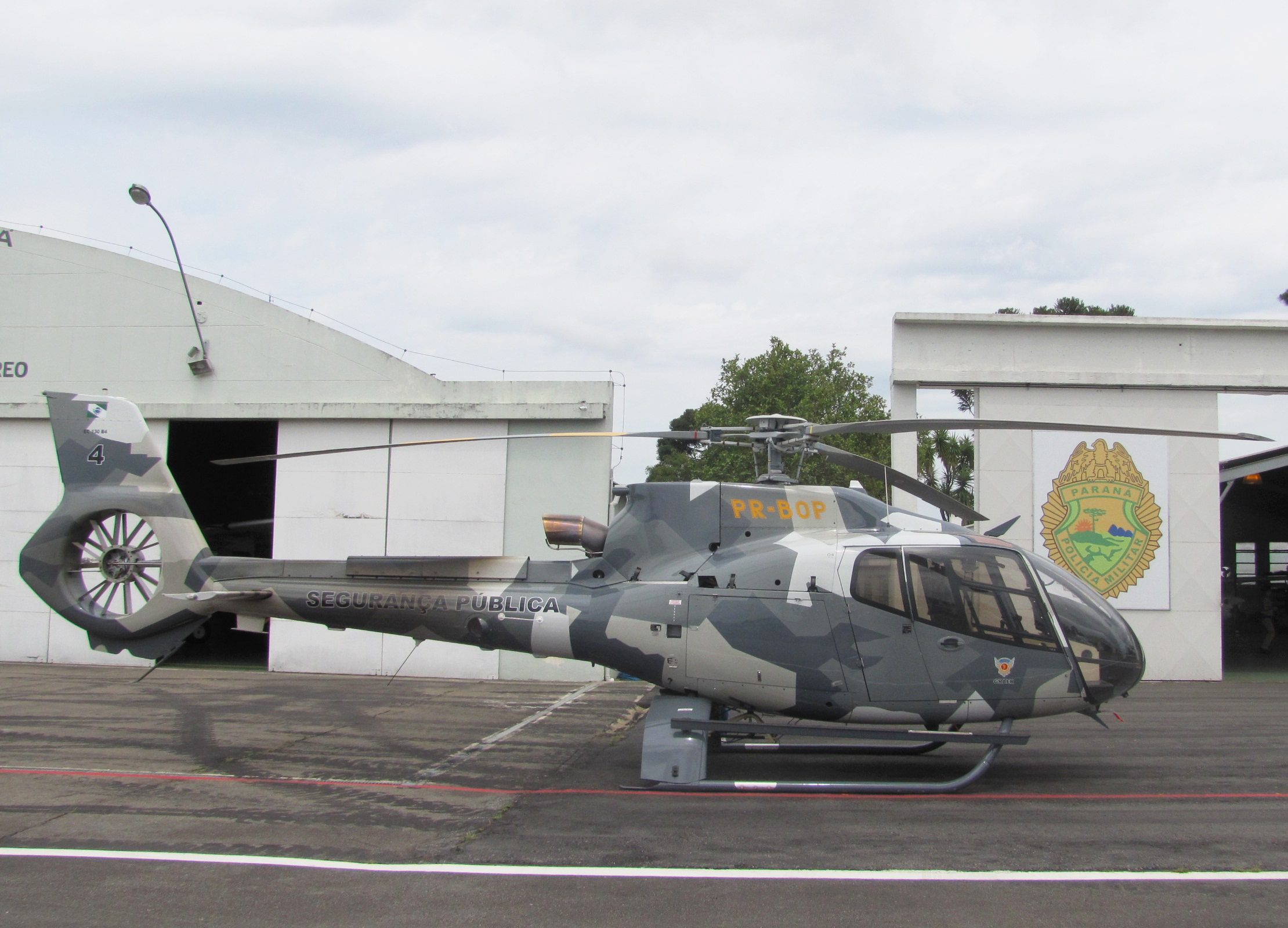
Helibrás EC130 B4, 2011

The EC130 reportedly has the largest cabin of any single engine helicopter in its class, with reportedly 54 per cent greater unobstructed space and 143 per cent more baggage space than the competing Bell 407. On the EC130, there are three prime seating configurations; a standard layout with a single pilot and six passengers, a similar arrangement with the two central seats facing aft, and a high density layout with three front passengers seats in line with the pilot. The EC130 was the first rotorcraft to become available with the business executive-orientated Stylence cabin configuration. The EC130 T2 is equipped with active anti-vibration control systems adapted from the Eurocopter EC225 Super Puma, these comprise five accelerometers and four linear actuators to produce smooth flight conditions and improved comfort for passengers on board. The EC130 can also be quickly configured between passenger and freight configurations.

In the emergency medical services (EMS) role, various interior configurations have been developed for the type; optional equipment includes customised mounting points for medical equipment, air compressors and liquid oxygen tanks, and United Rotorcraft’s Lowered Patient Loading System (LPLS). The EC130 has been popular with Air medical services (AMS) operators due to its large cabin being capable of accommodating up to two stretchers and two attendees, as well as a baggage area for storing equipment, wide side doors for access, and its enclosed Fenestron tail for safety. For law enforcement roles, the ability for various optional equipment to be installed on the EC130 is promoted, such as electro-optical systems, forward-looking infrared (FLIR) cameras, and search lights. In a cargo capacity, it is common for the rotorcraft to be fitted with additional external mirrors and a cargo sling.

== Operational history ==
In 2007, it was reported that the strongest demands for the EC130 and other such single-engine helicopters has come from Latin American and North American markets. By May 2008, the EC130 had overtaken the Bell 206 as the best-selling single-engine rotorcraft on the market. In 2012, Flight International referred to the EC130 as being one of Eurocopter's best-selling rotorcraft, noting that 238 orders had been placed in 2011, a 40 per cent increase over the previous year.

In 2007, an EC130 was used as a test aircraft in a large-scale flight test campaign to trial new noise-minimising (both externally and internally) flight procedures through the typical flight envelope, including during take-off, approach, and while at cruise.

In February 2008, it was announced that aerial tour operator Maverick Helicopters' fleet of 28 EC130s, the largest single operator in the world, had accumulated a combined total of 60,000 flight hours. By March 2015, Maverick's fleet was officially recognised as having attained 300,000 flying hours. Maverick also served as the launch customer for the improved EC130 T2. By 2015, Airbus Helicopters reported that the EC130 was in service with 279 operators and had accumulated more than 1,177,000 total flight hours worldwide.

In February 2016, Indonesian industrial estate developer Jababeka signed a memorandum of understanding for up to 12 H130s for an intercity shuttle service between Jakarta and Cikarang.

== Variants ==
EC130 B4
Initial launch model of the type.

EC130 T2
Upgraded variant of the EC130 B4; upgraded features such as improved air conditioning, full-flat floor, a more powerful engine (Turbomeca Arriel 2D) providing 10% more average power, and an anti-vibration system.
ACH130
VIP version of the H130

== Operators ==
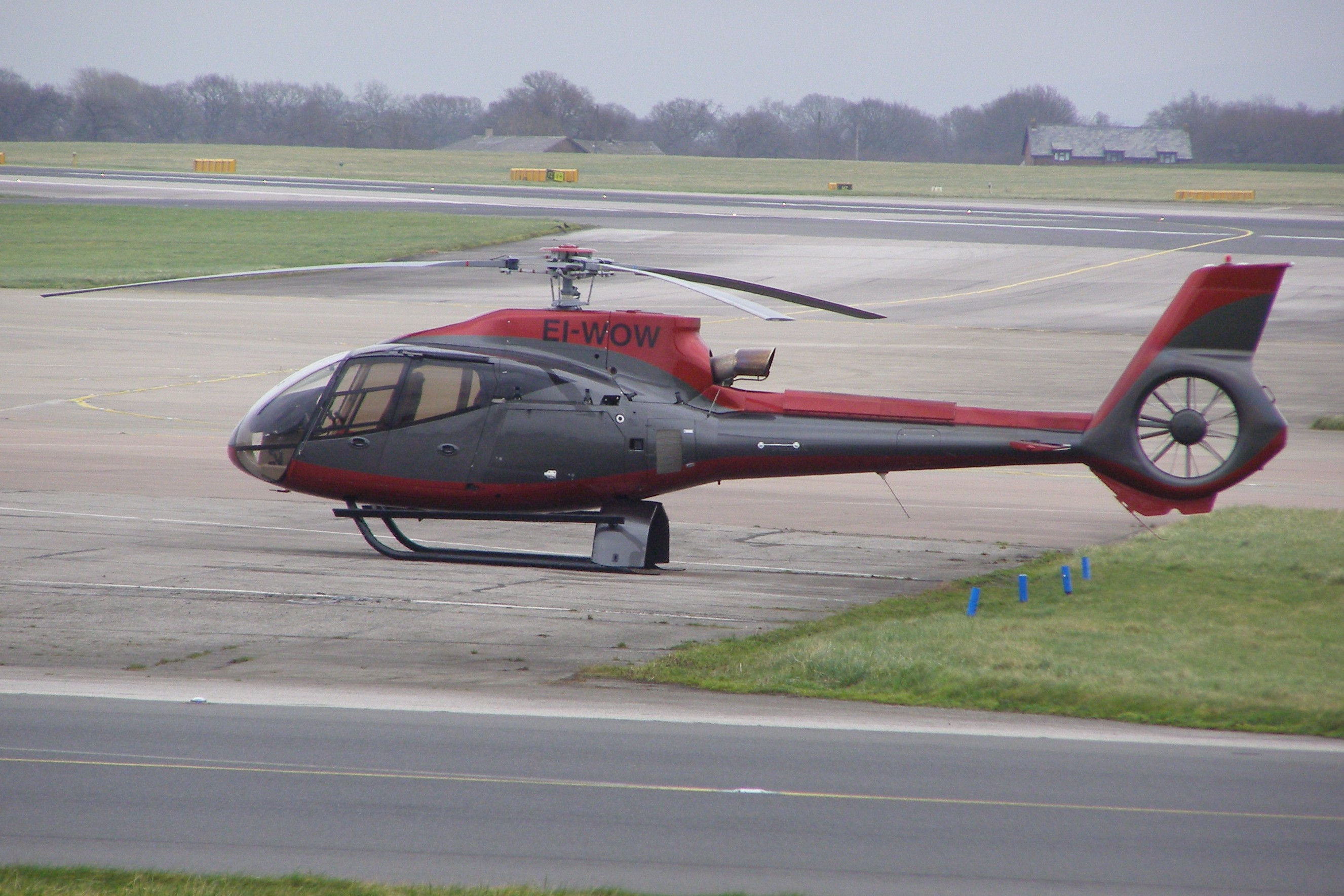
Skyheli Ltd EC130

Antigua and Barbuda

- CalvinAir Helicopters

Australia

- 12 Apostles Helicopters

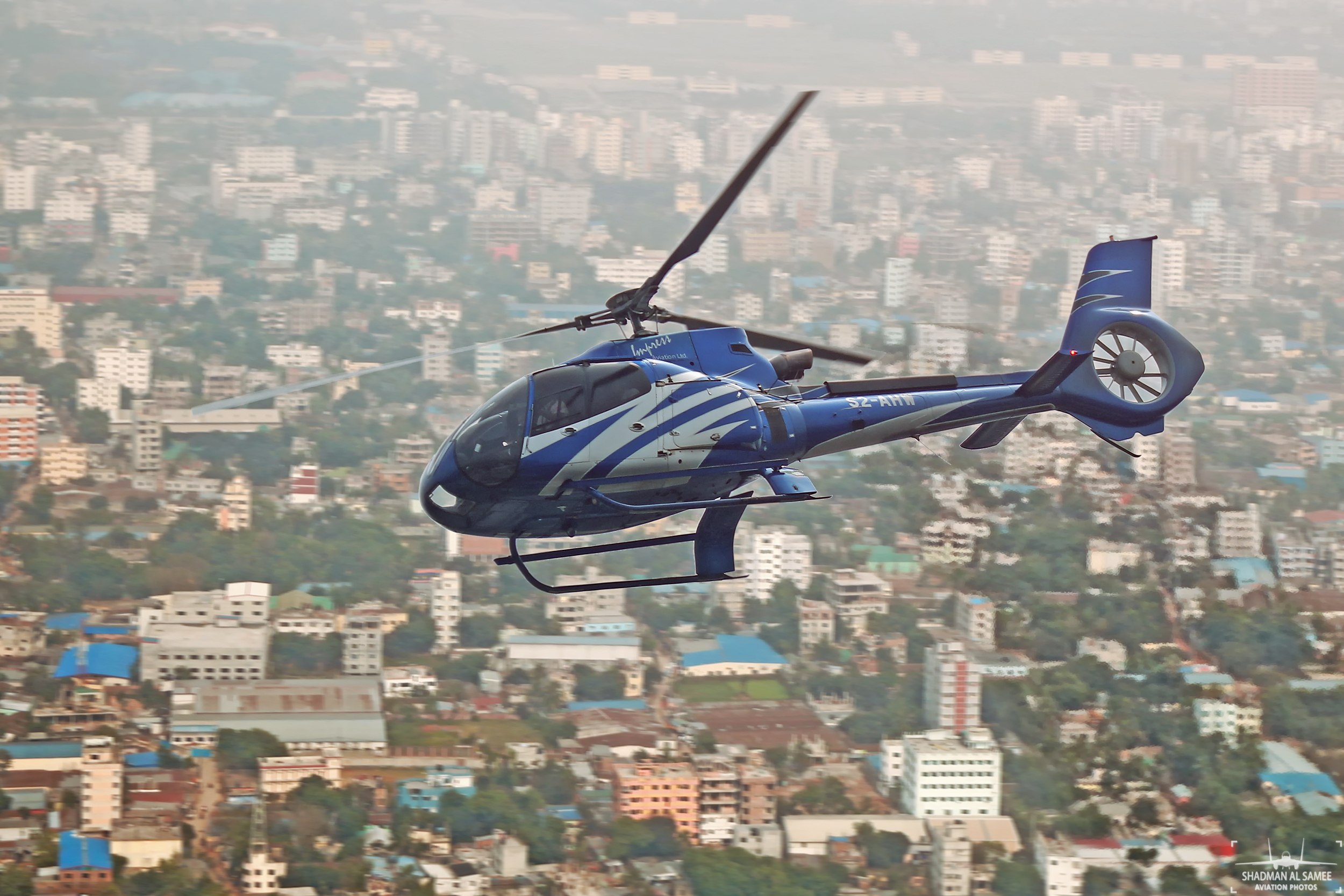
Impress Aviation Eurocopter EC-130B4

Bangladesh

- Impress Aviation

Bhutan

- Druk Air Helicopter Services

Brazil

- Paraná State Police

Canada

- Ontario Ministry Of Natural Resources

France

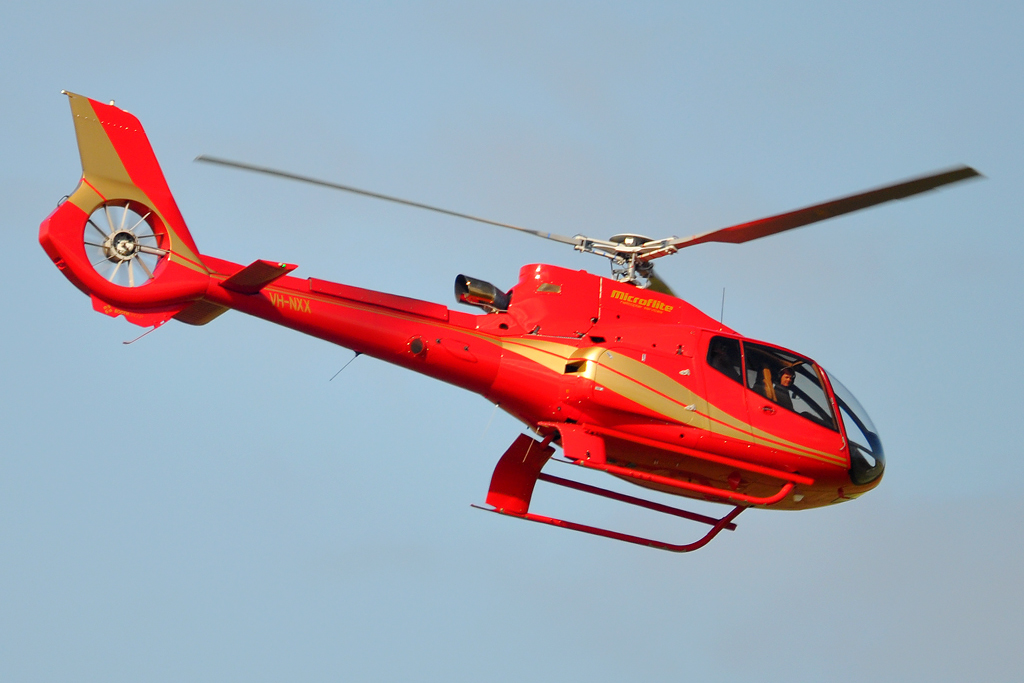
EC130 B4 Microflite Helicopter Services, Victoria, Australia

- Heli Securite

Indonesia

- Smart Aviation

Kenya

- RotorJet Aviation

Monaco

- Heli Air Monaco

Netherlands

- Heli Holland

Pakistan

- Princely Jet

Switzerland

- Air Zermatt

United States

- Blue Hawaiian Helicopters
- Broward County Sheriff's Office
- Air Methods Corporation
- Lutheran Health Network

== Notable accidents and incidents ==
- In February 2018, a EC130B4 operated by Papillon Airways, crashed in the Grand Canyon, killing five people. Due to strong winds, the helicopter spun out of control and crashed as it came in to land. Three people died immediately, two more died in hospital as a result of burns sustained during the crash. The deaths were found to be the result of a non-crash-resistant fuel tank that was ruptured on impact. In January 2024, a Nevada judge awarded a £79 million ($100 million) settlement to the family of the British couple killed in the Grand Canyon crash. The settlement consisted of $75.4 million (£59.3 million) from Airbus Helicopters SAS and £19.4 million ($24.6 million) from Papillon Airways. Following the accident, it is now required that all helicopter fuel tanks are shielded from fuel tank rupture on impact.
- On 2 January 2023, two EC130B4s operated by Sea World Helicopters collided in Gold Coast, Queensland, Australia, killing four people and injuring eight.
- On 3 March 2023, an EC130 with registration A5-BHT operated by Drukair Helicopter Services crashed near Wachey in Bhutan. Five people were on board, a family of four and a pilot. Two of the killed were a mother and her daughter.
- On 9 February 2024, an EC130 crashed in the Mojave Desert near Nipton, California around 10:00 p.m. PST. Six people were on board, including Nigerian banker Herbert Wigwe (CEO - Access Holdings) and no survivors were found.
- On 16 January 2025, an EC130 model B4, registration PR-WVT operated by C & F Administração de Aeronaves Ltda, manufactured in 2001, crashed in Brazil. The helicopter took off from Campo de Marte, in the northern area of São Paulo, bound for the city of Americana in the interior of the state of São Paulo, but crashed in the city of Caieiras in a dense forest. There were five occupants, the pilot, a couple and their daughter. Only the daughter who turned 12 on 01/17/2025 and the pilot of the aircraft survived.
- On 6 October 2025, an EC130 T2, registration N414RX operated by Reach Air Medical Services, crashed onto the eastbound lanes of U.S. Route 50 shortly after departing the UC Davis Medical Center in Sacramento, California. The three occupants, a pilot, nurse, and paramedic, were critically injured; there were no injuries on the ground. The flight nurse onboard later died at an area hospital.
- On 16 April 2026, an Airbus H130 T2 helicopter (effectively the same model as the Eurocopter EC130 T2), registration PK-CFX and operated by PT Matthew Air Nusantara, crashed in a remote rainforest on the island of Borneo, killing all eight people on board. It was the deadliest helicopter crash involving a Airbus Helicopters H130 T2/Eurocopter EC130 T2.
- On 19 August 2026, an EC130 B4, registration 5Y-GYM, crashed on Mount Ololokwe in Samburu County, Kenya, at around 9:00 a.m. EAT, killing all seven people on board. Among the seven killed were Michele Sensi-Contugi, the director of Ecuador’s National Intelligence Center, and his wife.

== Specifications ==
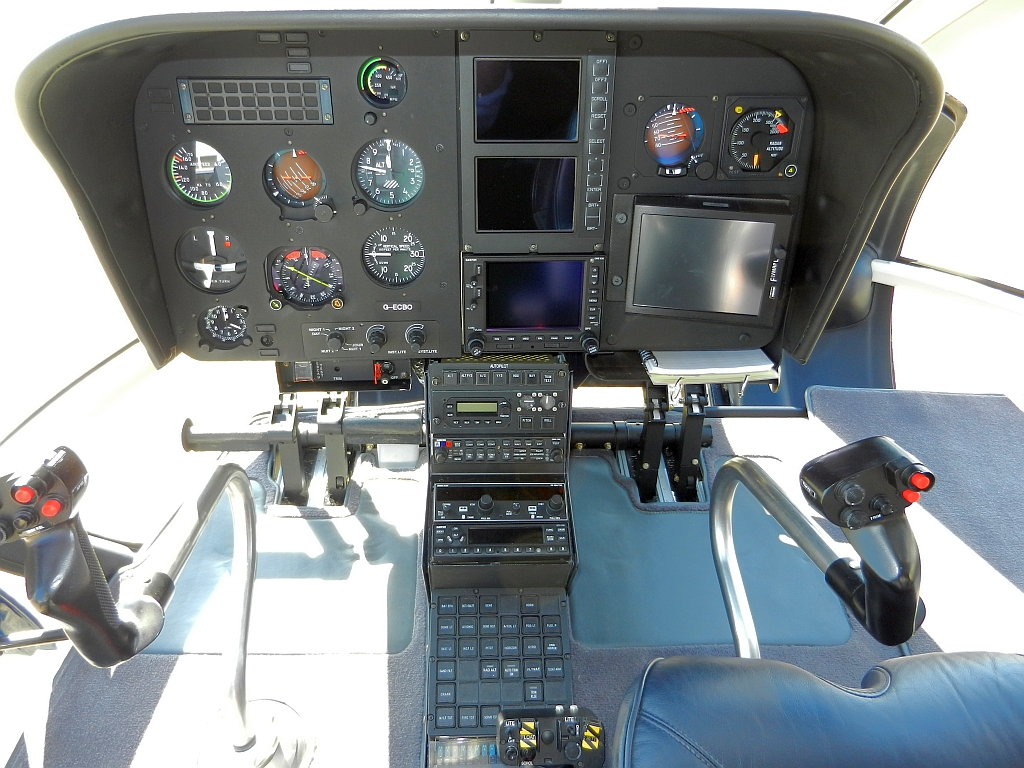
Cockpit of an EC130

External videos
- Official EC130 demonstration tour video
- Cockpit view of an EC130 landing on a ship at sea

Model	EC130 B4	EC130 T2 (H130)
Crew	1-2	
Capacity	5-6 (1 pilot)	
Length	12.64m (41ft 6 in)	
Height	3.34m (10ft 11in)	
Empty weight	1,379kg (3,040 lb)	1,377 kg (3,036 lb)
Max takeoff weight	2,427 kg (5,351 lb) / 2,800 kg (6,173 lb) with external load	2,500 kg (5,512 lb) / 3,050 kg (6,724 lb) with external load
Fuel capacity	540 L (140 US gal; 120 imp gal)	
Usable fuel	538.7 L (142.3 US gal; 118.5 imp gal)	
Powerplant	1 x Turbomeca (now Safran Helicopter Engines) Arriel 2B1 turboshaft engine, 632 kw (847 hp) takeoff power	1 × Turbomeca Arriel 2D turboshaft engine, 710 kW (950 hp) takeoff power
Main rotor diameter	10.69 m (35 ft 1 in)	
Main rotor area	89.75 m^{2} (966.1 sq ft) three blades	
Cruise speed	222 km/h (138 mph, 120kn)	237 km/h (147 mph, 128 kn)
Never exceed speed	287 km/h (178 mph, 155 kn)	
Range	593 km (368 mi, 320nmi	606 km (377 mi, 327 nmi)
Endurance	4 hr	4 hr
Service ceiling	4,772 m (15,655 ft)	7,010 m (23,000 ft)
Hover ceiling IGE	3,098 m (10,165 ft)	3,429 m (11,250 ft)
Hover ceiling OGE	2,537 m (8,325 ft)	2,957 m (9,701 ft)
Rate of climb	9.0 m/s (1,770 ft/min)	9.1 m/s (1,800 ft/min)

=== Avionics ===
Vehicle and Engine Multifunction Display (VEMD) with First Limit Indicator (FLI) fitted as standard. Optional G500 TXi combined PFD/MFD.

== See also ==
Related development

- Eurocopter EC120
- Eurocopter AS350 Écureuil
- Eurocopter AS355 Écureuil 2
- Eurocopter Fennec

Aircraft of comparable role, configuration, and era

- Bell 206
- Bell 407
- Bell 505
- HAL LUH
- MD Helicopters MD 600
- AgustaWestland AW119 Koala
- Marenco Swisshelicopter SKYe SH09
