= National Police Service Commission =

Kenyan independent government Commission

The National Police Service Commission of Kenya is an Independent government Commission established under the Constitution of Kenya to ensure smooth functioning of the National Police Service of Kenya.

== Membership ==
The current membership of the Commission is as follows:

- Eliud Kinuthia (Chairman)
- Alice A. Otwala, CBS, MBS (Dr)
- Eusebius K. Laibuta, MBS, OGW, HSC, 'ndc'K
- Lillian Kimba, MBS, OGW (Dr.)
- John Ole Moyaki, MBS
- Edwin Cheluget

== See also ==
- Kenya Police
