= Lodosoit =

- Location within Kenya
- Coordinates: 1.35°N 37.57°E
- Country: Kenya
- Province: Rift Valley Province
- Time zone: UTC+3 (EAT)

Lodosoit is a settlement in Kenya's Rift Valley Province.
