= Maralal =

- Town
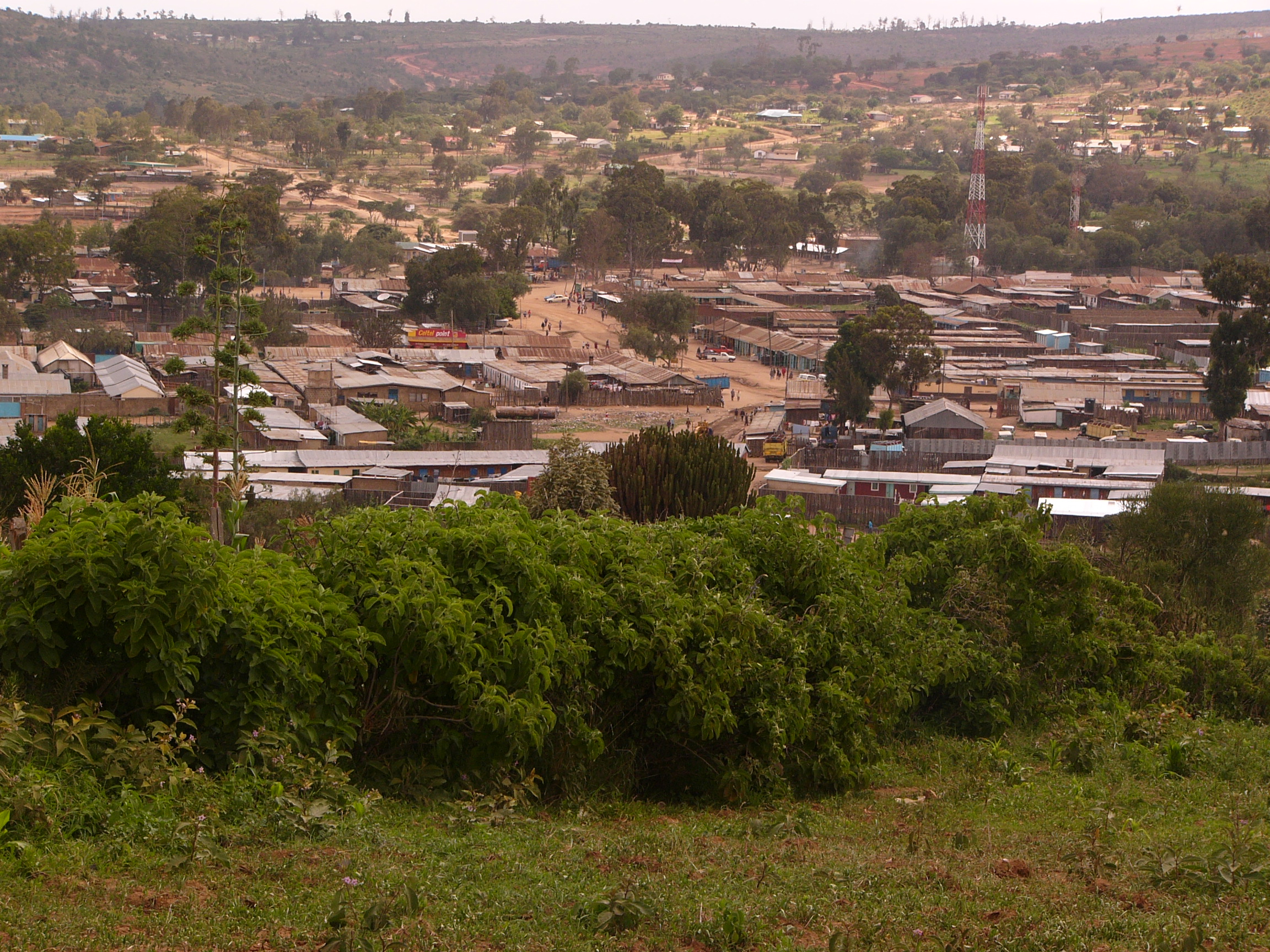

- Location in Kenya
- Coordinates: 1°06′N 36°42′E
- Country: Kenya
- County: Samburu County

Population (2019)
  - Total: 31,350
- Time zone: UTC+3 (EAT)

Maralal is a small hillside market town in northern Kenya, lying east of the Loroghi Plateau within Samburu County. It is the administrative headquarters of Samburu County. The town had an urban population of 31,350 (2019 census). The market was pioneered by Somali settlers From Isahakia community in the 1920s.

== Main sights ==
Approximately 2 km southwest of the town are the remains of the Maralal National Sanctuary. This nature site, which was closed by the Samburu County Government in September 2014, has since been largely absorbed into the town, and much of its wildlife has been eradicated by poachers. Encroachment began from the south as villages expanded, causing the natural wildlife corridors to be closed.

Maralal is also home to Kenyatta House, where Jomo Kenyatta was detained before his release. This rather unassuming modern house has a significant place in the history of modern Kenya.

Until 2016, the town hosted the Maralal International Camel Derby, but this has ceased to function primarily due to the outcry by foreign tourists objecting to the abuse of the animals used. Tourist activities in Maralal have slowed and the town is mostly a base for adventurous travellers heading to Lake Turkana, some 12 hours travel by road to the north.

Accommodation is generally inexpensive, though options are limited in terms of amenities. Road improvements from the south were expected to be completed by 2019, with hopes that tourism opportunities would subsequently improve. The closest airport is Kisima Airport, located in the nearby village of Kisima.

== Transport ==
The main road to Maralal starts from Gilgil and passes through Nyahururu and Rumuruti and ends in Baragoi. The entire stretch up to Maralal is tarmac, but is unpaved past that. The President of Kenya also launched work on the paved Naibor–Kisima–Maralal road in July 2017.
