= Baragoi =

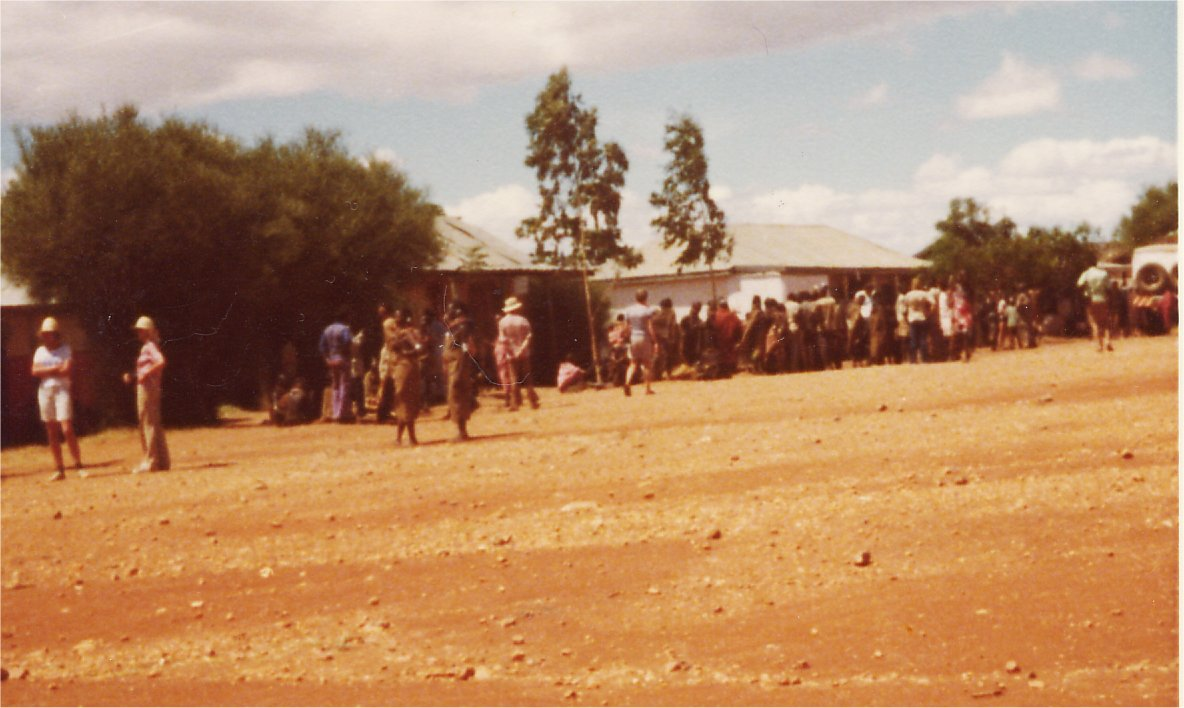

- Location in Kenya
- Coordinates: 1°47′N 36°47′E
- Country: Kenya
- County: Samburu County

Population (1999)
  - Total: 20,000
- Time zone: UTC+3 (EAT)

Baragoi is a market town in Kenya, lying north of Maralal and east of the Suguta Valley. It is located in Samburu County. The entire Baragoi division has a population of nearly 20,000 (1999 census) comprising mostly people from the Samburu and Turkana tribes.

The main access road to Baragoi is the A4 road from Rumuruti-Maralal-Baragoi, which as of 2019 was tarmac from Rumuruti to Maralal. A stretch of 108 km from Maralal to Baragoi is still unpaved.

== See also ==
- Baragoi Clashes
