= Samburu County =

- County
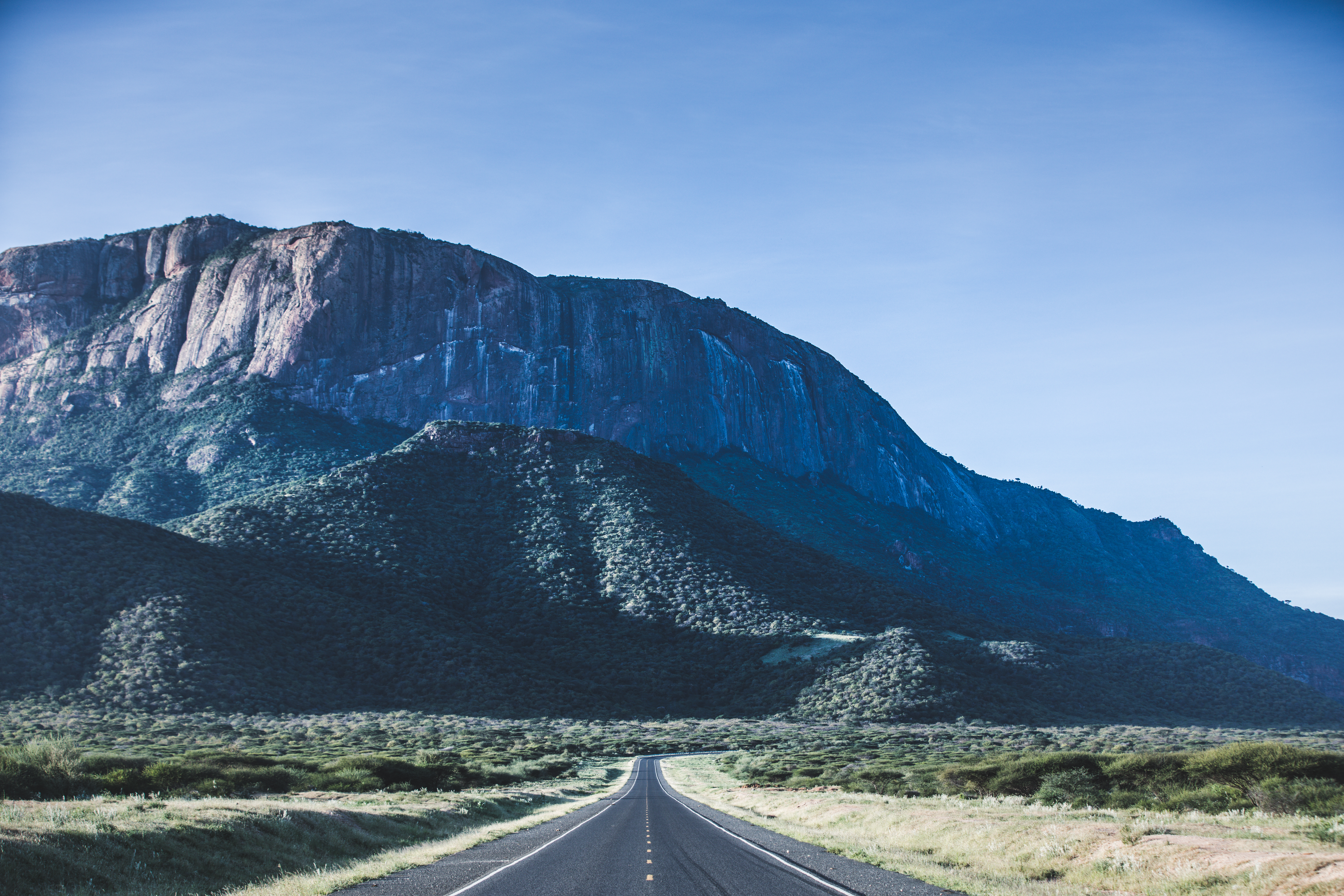
- Mount Ololokwe

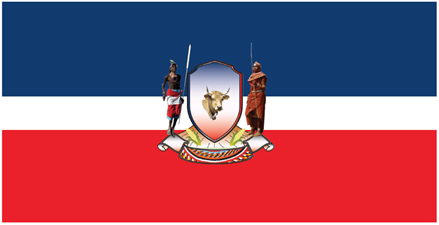
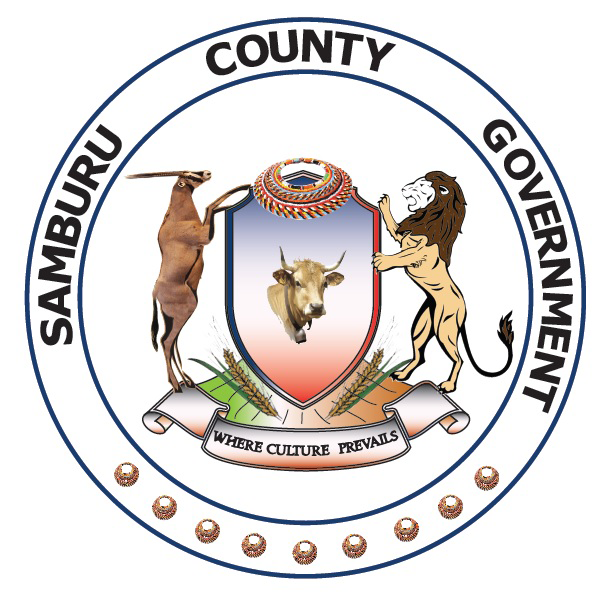
- Flag Coat of arms

- Location of Samburu County in Kenya
- Coordinates: 1°10′N 36°40′E
- Country: Kenya
- Formed: 4 March 2013
- Capital: Maralal

Government
  - Governor: Jonathan Lati lelelit

Area
  - Total: 20,182.5 km^{2} (7,792.5 sq mi)

Population (2019)
  - Total: 310,327
  - Density: 15.3760/km^{2} (39.8238/sq mi)
- Time zone: UTC+3 (EAT)
- Website: samburu.go.ke

Samburu County is a county in the former Rift Valley Province, Kenya which covers an area of roughly 21,000 km^{2} (8,000 mi^{2}) in northern Kenya where the Samburu, Turkana and many other tribes live. It stretches north from the Wuaso Ng'iro River to the south of Lake Turkana. According to the 2019 census, the county had a population of 310,327.

Within Samburu County are the towns of Maralal (the capital and largest town), Baragoi, Archers Post, South Horr, Wamba, Lodosoit, and Kisima.

It also includes the Samburu National Reserve, Bisanadi National Reserve, and Buffalo Springs National Reserve, Mount Ng'iro, Ndoto Mountains, Mathews Range (Ol Doinyo Lenkiyo), Kirisia Hills, and Loroki Forest.

The main access road to Samburu County is the A4 road from Rumuruti-Maralal-Baragoi, which as of 2019 was being tarmacked from Rumuruti up to Maralal.

There is a town named Samburu in Kwale County, Kenya, but it is not related to Samburu County or Samburu people.

== Population ==
Historical population
Year	Pop.	±%
1979	76,908	—
1989	108,884	+41.6%
1999	143,547	+31.8%
2009	223,947	+56.0%
2019	310,327	+38.6%

=== Religion ===
Religion in Samburu County

Religion (2019 Census)	Number
Catholicism	176,566
Protestant	54,349
Evangelical Churches	18,339
African instituted Churches	4,313
Orthodox	207
Other Christian	6,760
Islam	2,849
Hindu	71
Traditionists	30,433
Other	4,686
No Religion/Atheists	7,428
Don't Know	1,945
Not Stated	11

== County subdivisions ==
The county has three constituencies: Samburu East, Samburu West, and Samburu North. The headquarters of Samburu Central is Maralal, Samburu North is Baragoi and headquarters for Samburu East is Wamba although there has been controversy about the headquarters of Samburu East. Some schools of thought proposed Archers Post, a rapidly growing town, while others proposed Wamba town a less rapidly growing town.

Local authorities (councils)
Authority	Type	Population*	Urban pop.*
Maralal	Town	24,612	16,281
Samburu	County	118,935	18,507
Total	–	143,547	34,788
* 1999 census. Source:

Administrative divisions
Division	Population*	Headquarters
Baragoi	19,884	Baragoi
Kirisia	47,072	Mararal
Lorroki	25,571	Suguta mar mar
Nyiro	15,551	
Wamba	24,155	Wamba
Waso	10,314	
Total	143,547	-
* 1999 census. Sources:

== Government ==
The Samburu County Government is headed by Governor Jonathan Lati Leleliit who won the Samburu County's gubernatorial race in the 2022 general elections under the United Democratic Alliance (UDA). He garnered 40,740 votes against Dr. Richard Lesiyampe of the Jubilee Party who got 26,834 votes, and Daniel Lekupe an independent candidate, who garnered 1,847 votes, coming in third, and Richard Leiyagu who came last with 771 votes. He succeeded the former governor, Moses Lenolkulal, who retired after two terms in office. A member of the national Jubilee party, Lenolkulal was the first governor following Kenya's devolution to county administrations.
