= Somali drought (2021–2023) =

Natural disaster in Somalia

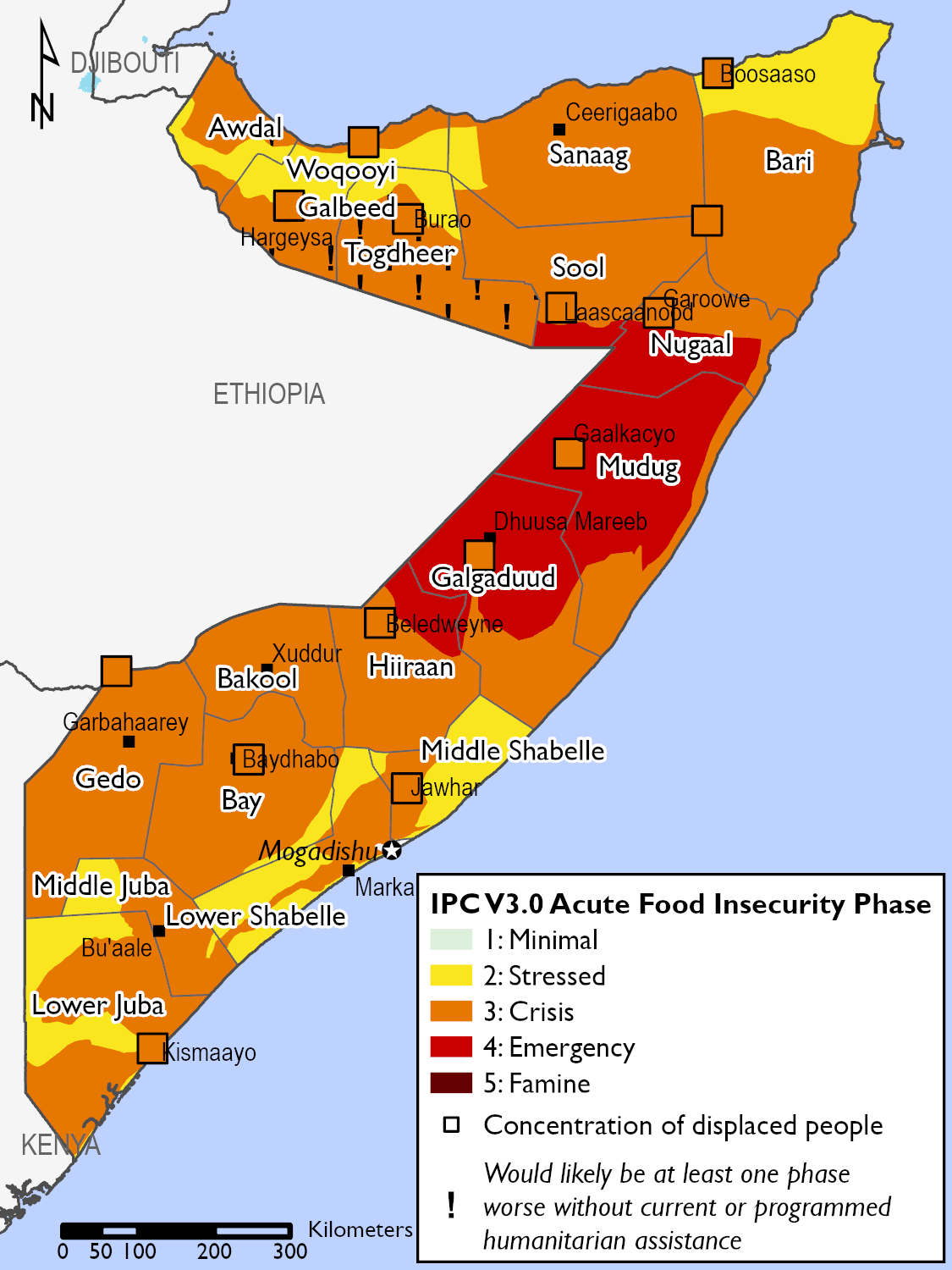
- February 2022 map with Integrated Food Security phase classifications from "minimal" to "famine"
- Country: Somalia
- Location: East Africa
- Period: 2021-2023
- Excess mortality: 43,000 (2022 estimate)
- Refugees: Over one million (2022)
- Theory: severe drought, irregular rainfall

During 2021–2023, Somalia confronted its most severe drought in forty years that affected over 7.8 million people —about half of Somalia’s population. As of 2024, drought-related impacts still continue to affect 4.4 million individuals across Somalia, who face including acute food insecurity. This includes an estimated 724,000 people at Integrated Food Security phase 4 (Emergency).

Over 80% of the country was suffering a severe drought. In affected areas up to 20% of the population have experienced shortages of water, food and pasture. More than one million Somalis were displaced in 2022, and over 300,000 people were still displaced in 2023.

== Causes ==
Climate change is a major cause with climate related hazards on the increase.

== Impact ==
- The drought has had a devastating impact on Somalia's agriculture sector, which constitutes up to 26% of the country's GDP, employs 90% of the informal workforce, and contributes 90% of its exports. Since mid-2021, one-third of the livestock in the most severely affected regions have died.
- Reduced access to surface water for both livestock and human use, alongside a shortage of available pasture, has severely impacted agricultural communities across the region. Some regions have seen up to a 70% reduction in crop yields.
- Particularly in central regions and in Puntland, communities are relying on boreholes as most shallow wells and berkads have dried up,
- The below-average Deyr rains, coupled with insufficient rainfall in the upper river catchments of the Ethiopian highlands, have led to a decline in water levels of the Juba and Shabelle rivers.

== Humanitarian situation ==
In 2022, 71% of people in Somalia were living beneath the poverty threshold. The number of people requiring assistance peaked in 2023 and reached about 8.25 million. While situation improved since then, in February 2024:

- 6.9M are still in need of humanitarian assistance.
- 4M people are facing acute food insecurity
- 1.7M of children are facing acute malnutrition

== Humanitarian Response Plan for Somalia ==
The Humanitarian Response Plan (HRP) for Somalia has undergone significant revisions over the years to address the evolving needs of its population. Here's a summary of the calls and responses from 2021 to 2023:

- 2021 HRP: The 2021 plan aimed to support 4 out of the 5.9 million people in need of humanitarian assistance, requiring a budget of $1.09 billion. The total funding received was about 79% of the requested $1.09 billion.
- 2022 HRP: The needs for the 2022 HRP grew significantly, driven by ongoing drought conditions and increasing displacement. It sought to assist 5.5 million people, with initial funding request of $1.46 billion. The response was scaled up to $2.1 billion, reaching 7.3 million individuals despite challenges in funding and security.
- 2023 HRP: In 2023, the number of people needing urgent assistance soared further, with 8.25 million people requiring humanitarian aid. The plan for 2023 sought $2.6 billion to respond to the needs, as famine risk remained high. However, only 46% of the requested budget were eventually allocated.

== See also ==
- 2017 Somali drought
- Food security
- Water security
- Horn of Africa drought (2020–2023)
- Climate change in Somalia
- 2025 hunger crisis in Syria
