= Samenwerkende Hulporganisaties =

International NGO from the Netherlands

The Samenwerkende Hulporganisaties (Dutch for Cooperating Aid Organizations) is a cooperative effort of aid organizations. The organizations work together to give humanitarian aid to people in disaster areas. The SHO cooperatively collects donations and informs to the public.

== Campaigns ==
The SHO has had campaigns for

- Iraq
- The Bam earthquake
- The War in Darfur
- The 2004 Indian Ocean earthquake
- The 2005 Kashmir earthquake
- Cyclone Nargis
- The 2010 Haiti earthquake
- The 2010 Pakistan floods
- The 2011 Horn of Africa drought.
- The Syrian civil war
- Typhoon Haiyan
- The Western African Ebola virus epidemic
- The 2015 Nepal earthquake
- The 2017 famine in South Sudan, Yemen, and in Northeast Nigeria, as well as the Somali drought
- The 2018 Sulawesi earthquake and tsunami
- The 2020 Beirut explosion
- The COVID-19 pandemic in India, Nepal, Yemen, Afghanistan, Malawi, Palestine, Suriname, Zambia, Uganda, Syria, Bangladesh, Pakistan, the Philippines, and Nigeria.
- The 2022 Russian invasion of Ukraine
- The 2023 Turkey–Syria earthquake
- The 2024 Middle East

== Participants ==
The participating organizations are:

- CARE Nederland
- Cordaid
- ICCO & Kerk in Actie (Church in Action)
- Nederlandse Rode Kruis
- Oxfam Novib
- Plan International Nederland
- Stichting Vluchteling (Refugee Foundation)
- Unicef
- World Vision
