= Badbaado (refugee camp) =

Refugee camp near Mogadishu, Somalia

Coordinates: 2°02′N 45°17′E

Badbaado is a refugee camp located outside of Mogadishu, Somalia. It formed as a result of the 2011 East Africa drought and famine, and now houses roughly 30,000 refugees.

Food aid is available for refugees there, but its supply has been tenuous due to the policies of al-Shabab. The limited access to food has been a source of violence in the camp, and there has also been looting by freelance militias and government forces. Due to the unsafe conditions, some refugees have fled Badbaado to seek other camps.
