= Horn of Africa drought (2020–2023) =

Natural disaster

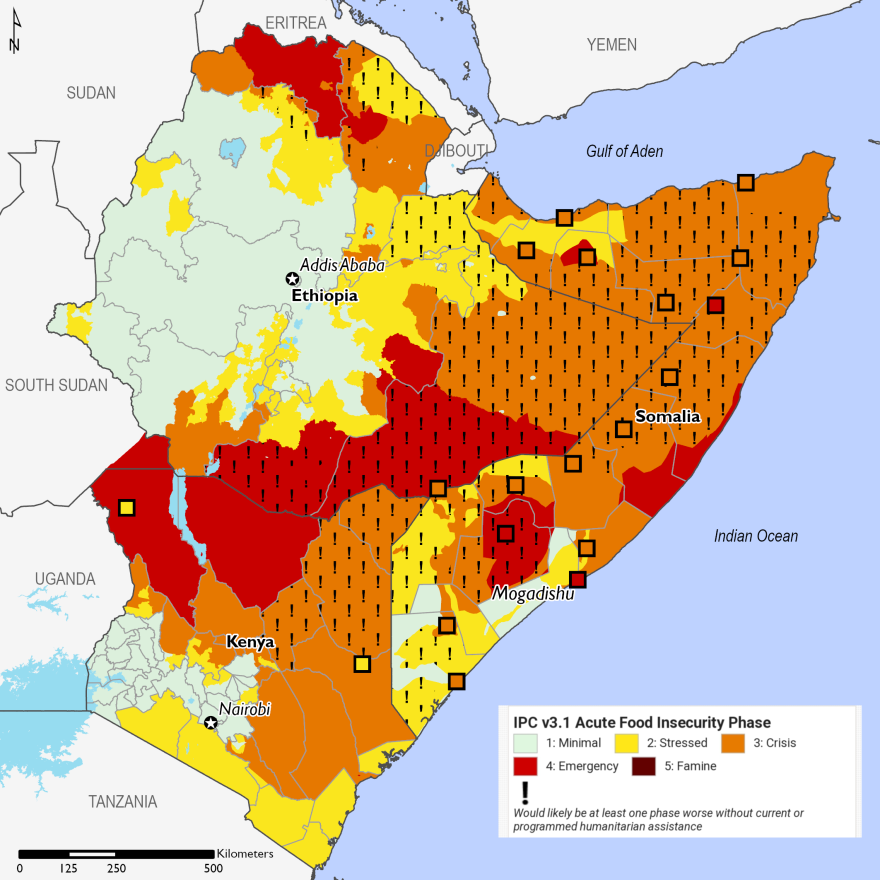
- Country: Somalia, southern and south-eastern Ethiopia, northern and eastern Kenya, Djibouti, Sudan, South Sudan, Uganda
- Location: East Africa
- Period: October 2020 – early 2023
- Refugees: 4.5 million refugees and 13.5 million internally displaced
- Theory: severe drought, irregular rainfall

The 2020–2023 Horn of Africa drought is a drought that hit the countries of Somalia, Ethiopia, and Kenya. The rainy season of 2022 was recorded to be the driest in over 40 years, with an estimated 43,000 in Somalia dying in 2022. The drought ended in early 2023, when Horn of Africa experienced above-average rainfall that led to multiple flooding events.

== Background ==
The drought was preceded by the 2011 East Africa drought and the 2017 Somali drought, and is caused by the El Niño effect. The negative conditions of the Indian Ocean Dipole is also a contributor to the drought.

== Humanitarian situation ==
As of 2023, 46.3 million were affected by the drought and subsequent flooding. This includes 9 million women of reproductive age (15 to 49 years) who face dangers to their health and aggravated risks of gender-based violence due to the drought. 13.5 million have been internally displaced while 4.5 million have become international refugees. With 9.5 million livestock being reported dead, broken down into 4 million in Ethiopia, 2.5 million in Kenya and over 3 million in Somalia, the region has seen monetary losses resulting in $1.5 billion being lost in livestock alone.

== Somalia ==
In Somalia it is estimated that 6.7 million have been severely affected by the drought, with 1.8 million children left malnourished. In Somalia an estimated 51,400 have been internationally displaced while 3.1 million remain displaced internally. The droughts effects are further exacerbated by the Russo-Ukrainian War, as Somalia imported 90% of its wheat from the region, with its own farming capabilities destroyed in the 3 decade long Somali Civil War. According to the World Food Programme, prices of food have also gone up considerably due to issues surrounding the Strait of Hormuz. By 2022 the drought had already claimed the lives of 43,000 people in Somalia half of which under the age of 5. The Baidoa and Burhakaba districts in the Bay region of the country are the most affected and are closest to famine as of now.

=== Response by governments and organisations ===
In Somalia the government has launched the SURP-II (Somalia Urban Resilience and Project Phase II) programme, which would mainly help Garowe, Baidoa, and Mogadishu deal with the drought by providing monetary assistance and health kits towards households, constructing communal latrines and emergency water supplies, and also providing further healthcare via mobile clinics. The World Bank has pledged to give 70 million USD to finance this initiative.

The World Health Organisation has also collaborated with local forces to fight diseases like cholera and measles, which have seen a resurgence in Somalia due to the drought, distributing Vitamin A, offering deworming services, and vaccination campaigns.

== Kenya ==
In Kenya the northernmost regions of the country, the Turkana, Samburu, Marsabit, Isiolo, Mandera, and Garissa counties remain the most affected by the drought, Kenya's Arid and Semi-Arid Lands, or ASAL. The drought has exacerbated conflict in the region, with the nations pastoralists being most affected, with the violence growing to such an issue that Uhuru Kenyatta, the president of Kenya, deemed it a "national emergency". Furthermore, a large amount of school children have had to drop out to support their families due to the situation.

=== Response by governments and organisations ===
The Kenyan government has taken steps to protect pastoralists against the drought, allowing pastoralists to sign up in a $120 million insurance scheme that will help them when drought hits, backed by the World Bank.

== Ethiopia ==
=== Overall ===
On 29 March 2022, the International Federation of Red Cross And Red Crescent Societies (IFCR) reported that 6.8 million Ethiopians were in need of humanitarian assistance. By October the same year, UNICEF reported that around 29.7 million people in Ethiopia were in need of humanitarian assistance.

=== Northern Ethiopia ===
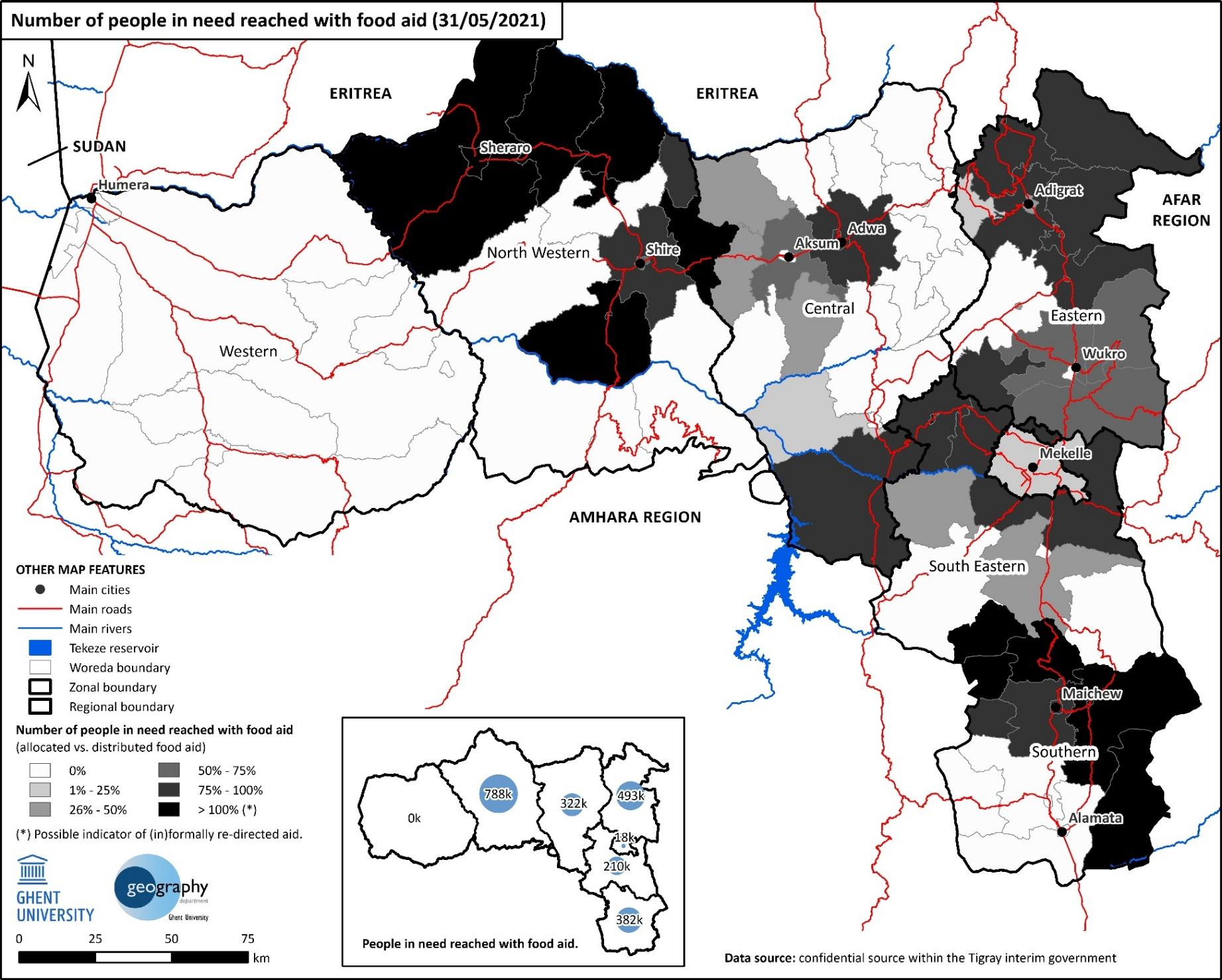
May 2021 map of people in need of humanitarian assistance that received food aid in the Tigray Region.

Beginning with the onset of the Tigray war in November 2020, acute food shortages leading to death and starvation became widespread in northern Ethiopia, and the Tigray, Afar and Amhara Regions in particular. As of August 2022, there are 13 million people facing acute food insecurity, and an estimated 150,000–200,000 had died of starvation by March 2022. In the Tigray Region alone, 89% of people are in need of food aid, with those facing severe hunger reaching up to 47%. In a report published in June 2021, over 350,000 people were already experiencing catastrophic famine conditions (IPC Phase 5). It is the worst famine to happen in East Africa since 2011–2012.

In addition to the Tigray war, which caused mass displacement and loss of harvests, it was exacerbated by then-ongoing drought and locust infestations in the region. Both during and after the war, the famine has been characterized by repeated disruptions to the distribution of humanitarian aid, including through blockades by the Ethiopian federal government, looting by various armed actors, the stymieing of grain shipments caused by the Russian invasion of Ukraine, and the dismantling of USAID by the second Trump administration.

== Livestock and wildlife ==
Pastoralists have reported much of their livestock perishing in the drought. In 2021, half of the livestock of men in the town of Kargi, Kenya were reported to have died, with 2.4 million livestock perishing in the entirety of Kenya.

Furthermore, the deaths of

- 205 elephants
- 512 wildebeests
- 381 common zebras
- 51 buffalos
- 49 Grévy's zebras
- 12 giraffes

were reported between September 2021 to 2022 May by the Kenya Wildlife Service in the Amboseli, Tsavo and Laikipia-Samburu areas.

== See also ==
- 2017 Somali drought
