= 2017 Somali drought =

Natural disaster in Somalia

- Map showing drought severity, food insecurity and internal displacement in Somalia as of May 2017.
- Country: Somalia
- Location: Entire country, particularly Bay, Bakool, Lower Shabelle, Gedo, Sool, Sanaag, Mudug, Nugal, Bari and Galgaduud
- Coordinates: 5.1521°N 46.1996°E
- Period: Late 2016– early 2018
- Total deaths: Unknown
- Refugees: Internally displaced persons (IDPs): Over 1 million (548,000 newly displaced since Nov 2016); Refugees: ~955,000 fled to neighbouring countries
- Causes: Successive failed rainy seasons; Crop failure; Livestock deaths; Conflict; Climate change
- Relief: Humanitarian needs: 6.2 million people; Funds raised for HRP: $1.3 billion (by Sept 2017); CERF allocation: $33 million
- Preceded by: 2011 East Africa drought
- Succeeded by: Horn of Africa drought (2020–2023)

The 2017 Somali drought was a severe drought that affected Somalia between late 2016 and early 2018, following consecutive seasons of low rainfall across the country. The drought brought widespread crop failure, livestock deaths, and displacement, resulting in one of the biggest humanitarian crises in Somalia since the 2011 East African drought. At its peak, it had left more than 6.2 million people, over half the country's population, requiring humanitarian assistance and facing food shortages with several water supplies becoming undrinkable due to the possibility of infection.

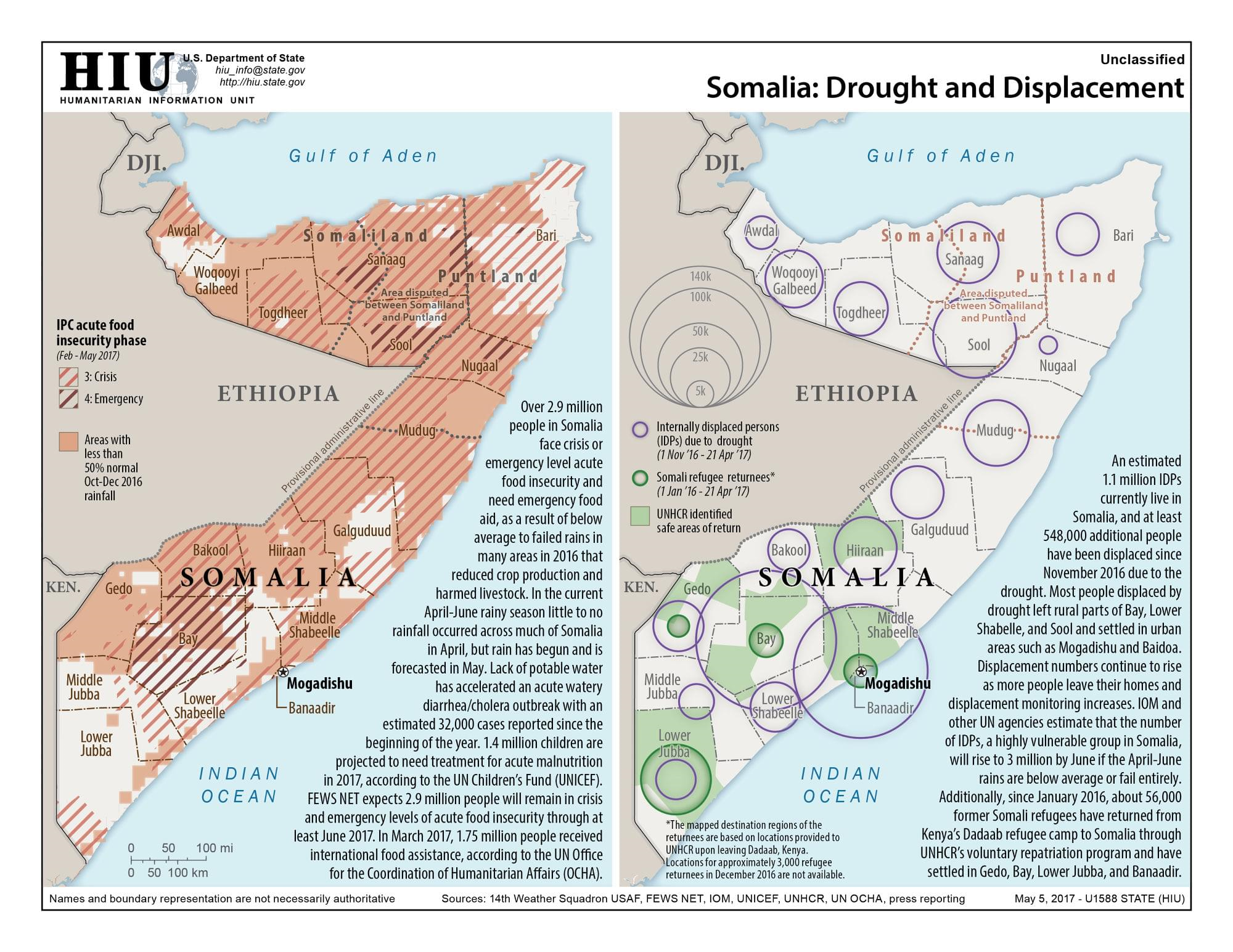
Map of drought and displacement in Somalia, 2017.

According to the Humanitarian Information Unit of the U.S. government, over 2.9 million people in Somalia face crisis or an emergency level acute food insecurity and need emergency food aid as a result of below average to failed rains in many areas in 2016 that reduced crop production and harmed livestock. Somalia was facing its seventh consecutive poor harvest and food stability is a major issue. In the April–June rainy season little to no rainfall occurred across much of Somalia in April, but rain had begun and was forecasted for May. Lack of potable water had accelerated an acute watery diarrhea-cholera outbreak, with an estimated 32,000 cases reported since the beginning of the year. 1.4 million children were projected to need treatment for acute malnutrition in 2017, according to the UN Children's Fund (UNICEF). FEWS NET expects 2.9 million people to remain in crisis and emergency levels of acute food insecurity through to June 2017. In March 2017, 1.75 million people received international food assistance, according to the UN Office for the Coordination of Humanitarian Affairs (OCHA).

From November 2016 to March 2017, over 615,000 people had been displaced due to the drought. Most people displaced by drought left rural parts of Bay, Lower Shabelle, and Sool and settled in urban areas such as Mogadishu and Baidoa. Since January 2016, about 56,000 former Somali refugees had returned from Kenya's Dadaab refugee camp to Somalia through UNHCR's voluntary repatriation program and have settled in Gedo, Bay, Lower Jubba, and Banaadir.

== Background ==
The drought came after a series of poor rainfall seasons across Somalia, leading to crop failures, depleted water points and livestock losses. This affected communities that depended on rain-fed agriculture and pastoralism, reducing food production.

The drought period came while Somalia was still recovering from decades of armed conflict, political instability, and recurring climatic shocks. Millions of people were already in need of humanitarian assistance from the effects of the 2011 East Africa drought and famine, which left a humanitarian crisis in the country.

In late 2016, the United Nations, the FEWS NET and the Food and Agriculture Organization raised an alarm that the lack of rain was threatening food security across Somalia.

== Causes ==
The main cause of the drought was the lack of consecutive rainy seasons in 2016 and early 2017. During the April-June and the October-November rainy seasons, the rainfall recorded was below average, which led to poor pasture conditions, reduced crop production and increased livestock mortality throughout the country. Climate variability associated with the El Niño-Southern Oscillation contributed to the poor rainfall performance and may be the drought's cause.

Rising temperatures from climate change also increased the severity of droughts in the horn of Africa by accelerating soil moisture loss and reducing the reliability of seasonal rainfall. From scientific studies, this climate change had increased the likelihood of prolonged drought conditions across eastern Africa.

== Humanitarian situation ==
This was one of Somalia's most severe humanitarian emergencies since the 2011 famine. By mid-2017, more than 6.2 million people required humanitarian assistance, while approximately 2.9 million people faced crisis or emergency levels of acute food insecurity. On 4 March, Somalia's prime minister Hassan Ali Khaire announced that at least 110 people died due to hunger and diarrhoea in Bay Region alone.

The crisis caused widespread displacements, where hundreds of thousands of people left rural areas in search of food, water and humanitarian aid, particularly moving toward urban centres such as Mogadishu, Baidoa and Kismayo. By the end of 2017, more than 900,000 people had been newly displaced by the drought.

The FAO Representative for Somalia noted that the situation in many rural areas, particularly Bay and Puntland, is starting to look "worryingly like the run-up to famine in 2010-2011". The International Organization for Migration also warned that if "action is not taken immediately, early warning signals point towards a growing humanitarian crisis in Somalia of potentially catastrophic proportions".

Hassan Saadi Noor, Save the Children's Country Director in Somalia stated:

We're on the verge of a catastrophe similar to 2011 – or worse, as conditions now are markedly worse than in the lead-up to that event. A quarter of a million lives were needlessly lost then, and we know that action at this stage can make a difference. The international community must step up to ensure that tragic moment in history isn’t repeated.

In addition to drought and famine, public health deteriorated significantly during the drought. Limited access to safe drinking water and sanitation contributed to large outbreaks of diseases, such as cholera and measles, which were spread. Children were particularly affected, with humanitarian agencies estimating that around 1.4 million children would require treatment for acute malnutrition. In March 2017, more than 8,400 cases of cholera had already been confirmed since January, which claimed 200 lives. On 20 March 2017, at least 26 people died from hunger in the semi-autonomous Jubaland region of southern Somalia, according to the state media. In July 2017, unclean drinking water had caused over 71,000 cases of cholera or severe diarrhoea in 2017, resulting in nearly 1,100 deaths.

== Calls for response ==
=== Immediate response ===
On 2 February 2017, a senior United Nations humanitarian official in Somalia warned of a famine in some of the worst drought-affected areas without a massive and urgent scale-up of humanitarian assistance in the coming weeks. He also stated that the omission of such an immediate response "will cost lives, further destroy livelihoods, and could undermine the pursuit of key state-building and peacebuilding initiatives". On 8 March 2017, United Nations Secretary-General António Guterres urged a massive scale-up in international support to avert a famine.

=== Adequate response ===
While the particular drought can only be dealt with by an immediate response, some suggest foresight and preventive, long-term, more cost-efficient and appropriate measures. Esther Ngumbi, researcher at the Department of Entomology and Plant Pathology at Auburn University in Alabama, suggests that the Horn of Africa's repetitive cycles of drought and hunger crisis should be responded to with "strategic integration and coordination between governments and NGOs" to "help farmers become more resilient to drought and other climate change-related disasters". Furthermore, she states that once this has been achieved, innovative ways to disseminate available information and solutions to farmers would be needed. Mohamed Abdulkadir, field manager of Save the Children, notes that food deliveries destroy local markets. German Federal Minister of Economic Cooperation and Development Gerd Müller suggested a billion-strong crisis fund for the United Nations to allow it to act preventively.

== Response ==
Since the 2011 famine, this has been one of the largest humanitarian responses in Somalia. It involved the Federal Government of Somalia, United Nations agencies, international humanitarian organisations, donor governments and local civil society organisations. Relief efforts focused on preventing famine through emergency food assistance, cash transfers, nutrition programmes, healthcare and water and sanitation interventions.

=== Government response ===
On 28 February 2017, President Mohamed Abdullahi Mohamed declared the drought a national disaster, enabling the government to mobilize domestic resources and appeal for increased international assistance The federal government established emergency coordination mechanisms with federal member states and humanitarian partners to prioritise the most severely affected regions. Emergency relief was coordinated through the Ministry of Humanitarian Affairs and Disaster.

=== United Nations ===
The United Nations coordinated the international humanitarian response through the Office for the Coordination of Humanitarian Affairs (OCHA), working closely with the Federal Government of Somalia and other humanitarian agencies. In February 2017, the UN warned Somalia that they faced a high risk of famine unless humanitarian assistance was expanded. Secretary-General Antonio Guterres visited Somailia in March 2017 and appealed for urgent international support.

The World Food Programme (WFP) expanded food distribution and cash-based assistance to food-insecure households, while the FAO supported farmers and pastoralists through livestock treatment campaigns, veterinary services, agricultural inputs and emergency cash to help preserve livelihoods.

The United Nations Children's Fund (UNICEF) increased treatment for severe acute malnutrition, vaccination campaigns, water supply projects and sanitation programmes. They also supported borehole rehabilitations, water trucking, hygiene campaigns and water treatment to reduce the spread of cholera and acute watery diarrhoea.

The World Health Organization (WHO) strengthened disease surveillance, established cholera treatment centres, supplied emergency medical kits and supported rapid response teams to manage outbreaks of cholera and other communicable diseases. International Organization for Migration (IOM) provided emergency healthcare through mobile medical teams, supported displaced communities with water, sanitation and hygiene services and assisted with population displacement monitoring.

=== International humanitarian organisation ===
The International Committee of the Red Cross (ICRC), working alongside the Somali Red Crescent Society, expanded food assistance, emergency cash programmes, nutrition services, healthcare and water projects throughout southern and central Somalia. In January-April 2017, the organisations assisted 760,000 people, including distributing food to 160,000 people, providing cash assistance to approximately 167,000 people, treating more than 12,000 people and supporting cholera treatment and primary healthcare services.

Other humanitarian organisations, including Save the Children, Médecins Sans Frontières (MSF), CARE International, Islamic Relief, Concern Worldwide, the Norwegian Refugee Council (NRC) and numerous non-governmental organisations, expanded nutrition programmes, healthcare services, education support, protection activities and water and sanitation projects in drought-affected communities.

=== Germany ===
According to reports of 1 May 2017, in a visit to the country, Germany's foreign minister, Sigmar Gabriel pledged to at least doublie the 70 million euros of aid and stated in a press conference with Somali prime minister Hassan Ali Khaire that the "international state community has to do more against the famine catastrophe". Furthermore, he asks the international community to no longer view Somalia as a failed state "but as a state which laboriously struggles to recreate a reliable state structure" enabling it to "guarantee security".

=== European Union ===
At the International Conference on Somalia in London on 11 May 2017, the European Union pledged 200 million euros for state-building and long-term recovery efforts. Mohamed thanked the donors, emphasising in his speech that Somalia wished to stand on its own two feet again, and he called on the participants at the conference to hold his administration accountable if they failed to achieve this.

== Aftermath ==
The drought had lasting humanitarian, economic and social consequences. There was improved rainfall during the April-June 2018 rainy season, which contributed partial recovery in agricultural production and pasture conditions in some regions. With many people having exhausted their assets during the drought, recovery was slow and hard.

Humanitarian assistance continued throughout 2018 as millions of people were still dependent on aids and humanitarian support programmes. IDPs continued to face overcrowding, inadequate shelter and limited access to basic services in displacement settlements, as many were unable to return to their places of origin.

== Timeline ==
Major events during the 2016–2018 Somali drought
Date	Event	Significance
Late 2015 – Early 2016	A strong El Niño event affected weather patterns across the Horn of Africa, followed by weak La Niña conditions.	Contributed to poor seasonal rainfall and set the stage for prolonged drought across Somalia.
April–June 2016	The April-June rainy season recorded below-average rainfall across much of Somalia.	Reduced crop production, degraded pasture and depleted water sources for farming and pastoral communities.
October–December 2016	The October-December rainy season also performed poorly in many parts of the country.	Consecutive failed rainy seasons intensified food insecurity, livestock losses and water shortages.
January 2017	Humanitarian agencies reported rapidly increasing displacement and worsening outbreaks of cholera and acute watery diarrhoea (AWD).	Demonstrated the growing humanitarian impact of the drought and heightened concerns over famine.
2 February 2017	The United Nations warned that Somalia faced a significant risk of famine without an immediate scale-up of humanitarian assistance.	Marked the first major international warning that the crisis could develop into a famine similar to that of 2011.
28 February 2017	President Mohamed Abdullahi Mohamed declared the drought a national disaster.	Enabled greater national coordination and strengthened appeals for international humanitarian assistance.
March 2017	Prime Minister Hassan Ali Khaire reported deaths linked to hunger and disease in Bay Region, while UN Secretary-General António Guterres visited Somalia to advocate for increased international support.	Drew global attention to the severity of the crisis and accelerated humanitarian funding and response efforts.
April–May 2017	Humanitarian agencies significantly expanded food assistance, cash transfers, nutrition programmes, healthcare services, and water and sanitation interventions.	Helped reduce mortality, contain disease outbreaks and prevent famine in the worst-affected areas.
11 May 2017	At the London Conference on Somalia, international donors pledged additional humanitarian and development assistance, including €200 million from the European Union.	Increased funding supported emergency relief operations and longer-term recovery initiatives.
Mid-2017	More than 6.2 million people required humanitarian assistance, around 2.9 million experienced acute food insecurity, and over 900,000 people had been displaced.	Represented the peak of the humanitarian crisis and one of Somalia's largest emergencies since the 2011 famine.
Late 2017	Continued humanitarian assistance, improved coordination and favourable rainfall in some areas reduced the immediate risk of famine.	Somalia avoided a nationwide famine despite the scale of the drought.
2018	Improved April-June rainfall supported partial recovery of crops and pasture, while humanitarian assistance continued for affected communities.	Marked the transition from emergency response to recovery, although millions remained vulnerable due to displacement and livelihood losses.

== See also ==
- 2011 East Africa drought
- 2017 South Sudan famine
- Horn of Africa drought (2020–present)
- Somali drought (2021–present)
- Food security
- Water security
