= Climate change in Somalia =

Climate change in Somalia refers to changes in the climate in Somalia and the subsequent response, adaption and mitigation strategies of the country. Climate models predict that the East Africa region is likely to experience both near-term alterations in climate such as warmer temperatures, changes in the frequency and intensity of extreme events, and decreased precipitation, as well as long-term shifts such as sea level rise.

Somalia is the second most climate-vulnerable country in the world. The country has seen an increase in severe climatic events since 1990, with three major droughts since 2010, recurring flooding and more regular locust swarms that destroy crops. Climate change is expected to put significant strain on already scarce water and agricultural resources within the country, threatening the national security and political stability.

== Impacts of climate change on the natural environment ==
=== Temperature and weather changes ===
Köppen climate classification map for Somalia for 1980–2016

2071–2100 map under the most intense climate change scenario. Mid-range scenarios are currently considered more likely

Somalia is generally hot and dry, with two rainy seasons. Mean temperatures in Somalia are amongst the highest worldwide. Hot conditions prevail throughout the year, in particular in the southwest near the border to Ethiopia, where annual mean temperatures surpass 29 °C. The main rainy season is from April to June, and the second rainy season is from October to December. Annual precipitation in the hot and arid northern area mostly amounts to under 250 mm and decrease to less than 100 mm in the very northeast. The central plateau receives between 200 and 300 mm of precipitation, while it increases toward the South to around 400 to 500 mm of rainfall annually. Southwestern and northwestern regions receive the most precipitation, with an average between 500 and 700 mm.

The climate has changed over the last several decades:

- There has been a gradual, continuous temperature increase of 1 to 1.5°C since 1991,
- Extreme weather impacted the country, with severe drought in 2011 and 2017.
- Extended droughts, flash floods and cyclones, have become more frequent in the past 25 years.

Projections models show that

- Both drought and floods are likely to increase in intensity and frequency.
- While uncertainty exists, models project that monthly rainfall will increase slightly from September to December by between 2040 and 2060.
- The average temperature is expected to increase by between 1-1.75°C by between 2040 and 2060, and projected increases of 3.2 to 4.3°C by 2100.

=== Sea level rise ===
The sea level is projected to rise with high certainty under future emission scenarios. The median climate models project a sea level rise of 12 cm until 2030, 20 cm until 2050 and 36 cm until 2080 under RCP2.6, as compared to the year 2000. Under RCP6.0 (emissions peak around 2080, then decline), the sea level is projected to rise by 11 cm until 2030, 21 cm until 2050 and 42 cm until 2080.

The projected sea level rise threatens the livelihoods of coastal communities, particularly in southern Somalia, including the country's capital Mogadishu, and may cause saline intrusion in coastal waterways and groundwater reservoirs.

=== Water availability ===
Projections of water availability are highly uncertain under emissions scenarios. Without considering population growth, models show a slight increase in line with future precipitation projections. Considering projected population growth, overall per capita water availability can be expected to half by 2080 under both RCP2.6 and RCP6.0 emission scenarios, though uncertainty around current and projected available water volumes is extremely high.

== Impact on people ==
Somalia is estimated very susceptible to the effects of climate change and extreme weather. Its ND Gain index is of 172 in 2020, making it the 2nd most vulnerable country to climate change and other global challenge, and the 120th most ready country to improve resilience.

Climate change impacts in East Africa are anticipated to result in a range of direct and indirect impacts affecting food security due to high temperature stress and changes in the frequency and intensity of droughts.

The gradual, continuous temperature increase of 1 to 1.5°C since 1991, the extended droughts, flash floods and cyclones, have become more frequent in the past 25 years, and the effects of longer-term climatic change – erratic rainfall, disrupted monsoon seasons, strong winds, storms and soil erosion pose a serious threat to 83 per cent of the population very reliant on renewable resources from agriculture, pastoralism, hunting, forestry and fishing.

Rising temperatures and the strong increase in very hot days will very likely result in an increased exposure to heatwaves in Somalia. Heat-related mortality will very likely increase to between 2.7 and 3.3 deaths per 100 000 people/year until 2030, and then drastically increase to between 3.6 and 11.4 deaths per 100 000 people/year until 2080, depending on the emissions scenario.

== Climate change mitigation and adaptation ==
The severe impacts of climate change on the region, made climate change mitigation and adaptation an important issue in it.

=== Policies and legislation ===
Somalia was an early signatory of the Paris Climate Agreement in 2016.

The country formulated its first National Adaptation Programme of Action (NAPA) in 2013. The program developed with the support of the UN Development Programme (UNDP), was Somalia's first step towards a nationwide climate adaptation strategy.

=== Water management mitigation ===
Since the formulation of the first NAPA plan, progress has been made in boosting resilience to prepare for and withstand extreme weather, such as better water management to be able to withstand drought periods.

Ecosystem-based adaptation solutions are being embraced. In one example, under a UNDP-supported water management project, community-led afforestation initiatives are helping combat desertification.

Other alternatives include rewilding of water catchment construction, rehabilitation of water infrastructure, flood defense walls, irrigation canals, mapping water resources and breakage points along rivers, rangeland restoration of soils, mangrove, cactus and tree planting, change in breeding practices etc.

=== Greenhouse gas mitigation ===
- In 2014 Somalia was responsible for 36.46 MtCO2e (metric greenhouse gas (GHG) emissions, or 0.07% of the world total emissions
- Per capita Somalis produced 1.02 tCO2e of GHG emissions. Worldwide is 6.73 tCO2e per capita.
  - Agriculture was the most significant emitting sector, at 56 % of country's total emissions.
  - Land-use change and forestry (LUCF) accounted for 36% of country's total emissions.
  - Land use change and forestry reduce emission by 16% between 1990 and 2014.
  - Somalia's population has grown by 390% between 1960 and 2010, to reach approximately 13.5 million people in 2014.

In 2021, Somalia registered a new NDC plan, which includes an overall goal to reduce greenhouse gas "business-as-usual" emissions by 30 percent by 2030 and adapt to the effects of climate change under the global Paris Agreement.

=== Climate change and adaptations ===
Innovation and technology are critical to dealing with the many facets of the climate crisis, this include climate change adaptation, which seeks to lower the risks posed by the consequences of climate change. Because of changes in extreme weather and sea level rise, due to climate change, the UN has recommended early warning systems as key elements of climate change adaptation and climate risk management. Technological advances have made it possible to trigger an early and rapid response to threats such as locust swarms. Rainy conditions create favorable conditions for locust swarms to breed. Their invasion presents a threat to food security, where a small swarm of 1km2 can in just one day consume crops and vegetation that could feed 35000 people. The FAO delivered desert an early warning system to delay monitor conditions favoring locust invasions to Somalia. The locus surveillance and control system rely on satellite imagery as well as weather and habitat data and can cast alerts up to six weeks in advance of a possible invasion. To make data collection more accessible, a mobile smartphone app. was developed and satellite data communicator modified to enable farmers without connectivity to collect data.

== See also ==
- Water scarcity in Africa
