= 2011 East Africa drought =

Natural disaster

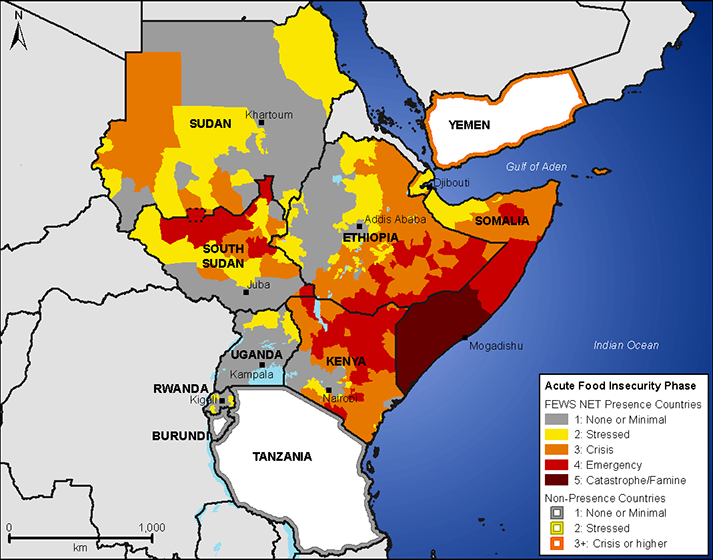
- Famine Early Warning Systems Network (FEWS Net) food security projection for East Africa at the height of the drought (July–Sept 2011).
- Country: Somalia, Djibouti, Ethiopia, Kenya, Uganda and neighboring countries
- Location: East Africa
- Period: July 2011 – August 2012
- Total deaths: 50,000–260,000
- Death rate: 0.6–2.8 per 10,000 per day
- Theory: severe drought, irregular rainfall
- Relief: $1.3 billion
- Effect on demographics: 9.5 million in need of assistance in Somalia, Djibouti, Ethiopia and Kenya

Occurring between July 2011 and mid-2012, a severe drought affected the entire East African region. Said to be "the worst in 60 years", the drought caused a severe food crisis across Somalia, Djibouti, Ethiopia and Kenya that threatened the livelihood of 9.5 million people. Many refugees from southern Somalia fled to neighboring Kenya and Ethiopia, where crowded, unsanitary conditions together with severe malnutrition led to a large number of deaths. Other countries in East Africa, including Sudan, South Sudan and parts of Uganda, were also affected by a food crisis.

According to FAO-Somalia, the food crisis in Somalia primarily affected farmers in the south rather than the northern pastoralists. Human Rights Watch (HRW) consequently noted that most of the displaced persons belonged to the agro-pastoral Rahanweyn clan and the agricultural Bantu ethnic minority group. On 20 July, the United Nations officially declared famine in two regions in the southern part of the country (IPC Phase 5), the first time a famine had been declared in the region by the UN in nearly thirty years. Tens of thousands of people are believed to have died in southern Somalia before famine was declared. This was mainly a result of Western governments preventing aid from reaching affected areas in an attempt to weaken the Al-Shabaab militant group, against whom they were engaged.

Although fighting disrupted aid delivery in some areas, a scaling up of relief operations in mid-November had unexpectedly significantly reduced malnutrition and mortality rates in southern Somalia, prompting the UN to downgrade the humanitarian situation in the Bay, Bakool and Lower Shabele regions from famine to emergency levels. According to the Lutheran World Federation, military activities in the country's southern conflict zones had also by early December 2011 greatly reduced the movement of migrants. By February 2012, several thousand people had also begun returning to their homes and farms. In addition, humanitarian access to rebel-controlled areas had improved and rainfall had surpassed expectations, improving the prospects of a good harvest in early 2012.

By January 2012, the food crisis in southern Somalia was no longer at emergency levels according to the International Committee of the Red Cross (ICRC). The UN indicated in February 2012 that indirect data from health and relief centers pointed to improved general conditions from August 2011. The UN also announced that the famine in southern Somalia was over. However, FEWS NET indicated that Emergency (IPC Phase 4) levels of food insecurity persisted through March in several areas on account of crop flooding and ongoing military operations in these areas, which restricted humanitarian access, trade and movement.

Aid agencies subsequently shifted their emphasis to recovery efforts, including digging irrigation canals and distributing plant seeds. Long-term strategies by national governments in conjunction with development agencies were said to offer the most sustainable results.

== Background ==
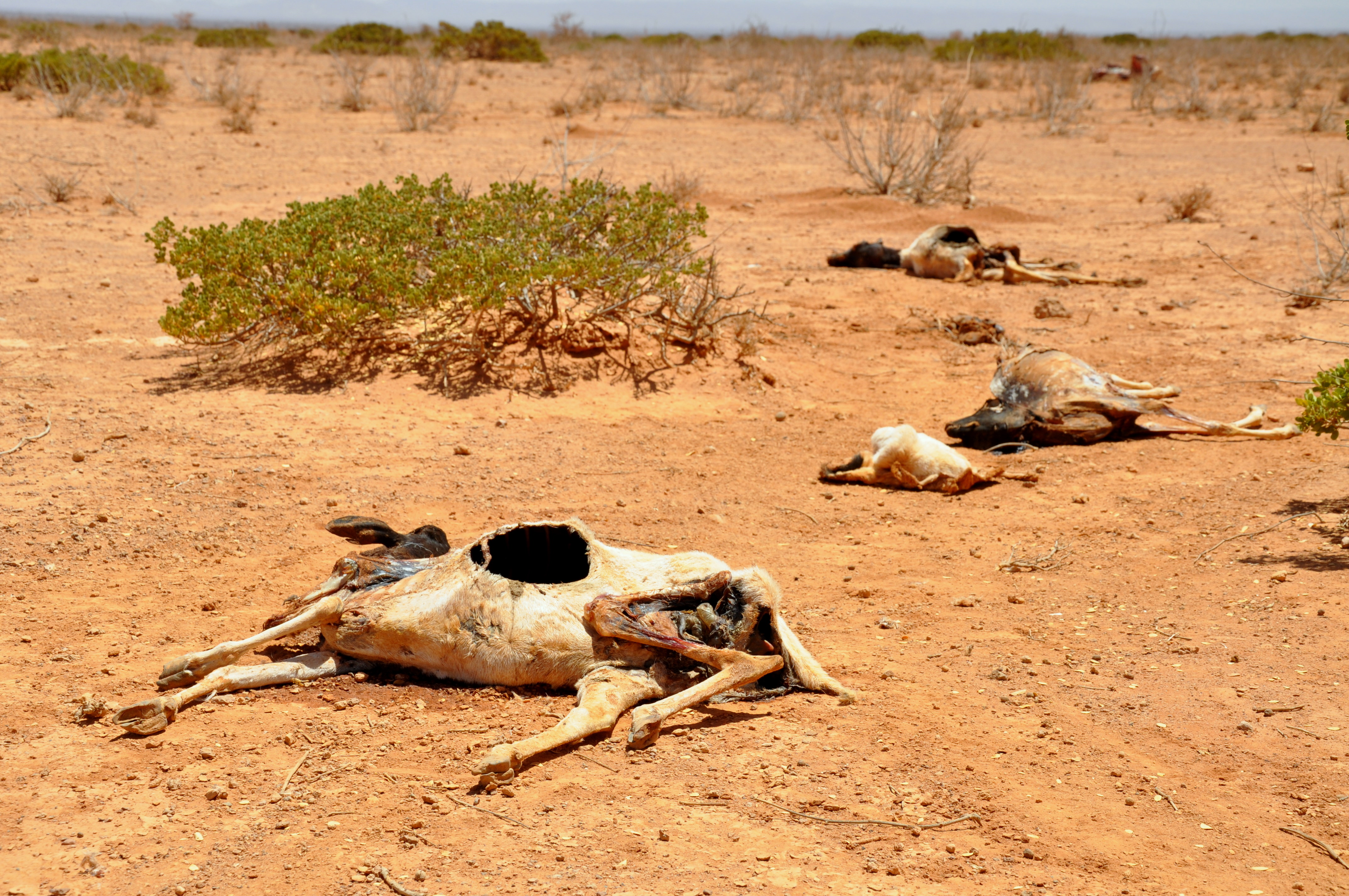
Carcasses of sheep and goats amidst a severe drought in Waridaad in the Somaliland region in 2017

Weather conditions over the Pacific, including an unusually strong La Niña, interrupted seasonal rains for two consecutive seasons. The rains failed in 2011 in Kenya and Ethiopia, and for the previous two years in Somalia. In many areas, the precipitation rate during the main rainy season from April to June, the primary season, was less than 30% of the average of 1995–2010. The lack of rain led to crop failure and widespread loss of livestock, as high as 40–60% in some areas, which decreased milk production as well as exacerbating a poor harvest. As a result, cereal prices rose to record levels while livestock prices and wages fell, reducing purchasing power across the region. Rains were also not expected to return until September of the year. The crisis is compounded by rebel activity around southern Somalia from the Al-Shabaab group.

The head of the United States Agency for International Development, Rajiv Shah, stated that climate change contributed to the severity of the crisis. "There's no question that hotter and drier growing conditions in sub-Saharan Africa have reduced the resiliency of these communities." On the other hand, two experts with the International Livestock Research Institute suggested that it was premature to blame climate change for the drought. Indeed, the majority of climate models had predicted a long-term increase in rain for this area. While there is consensus that a particularly strong La Niña contributed to the intensity of the drought, the relationship between La Niña and climate change is not well-established.

The failure of the international community to heed the early warning system was criticized for leading to a worsening of the crisis. The Famine Early Warning Systems Network, financed by U.S.A.I.D., anticipated the crisis as early as August 2010, and by January 2011, the American ambassador to Kenya declared a disaster and called for urgent assistance. On 7 June 2011, FEWS NET declared that the crisis was "the most severe food security emergency in the world today, and the current humanitarian response is inadequate to prevent further deterioration". The UN later announced on 28 June that 12 million people in the East Africa region were affected by the drought and that some areas were on the brink of famine, with many displaced in search of water and food. Oxfam's humanitarian director Jane Cocking stated that "This is a preventable disaster and solutions are possible". Suzanne Dvorak, the chief executive of Save the Children, wrote that "politicians and policymakers in rich countries are often skeptical about taking preventative action because they think aid agencies are inflating the problem. Developing country governments are embarrassed about being seen as unable to feed their people. [...] these children are wasting away in a disaster that we could—and should—have prevented." Soon after a famine was declared in parts of southern Somalia. Oxfam also charged several European governments of "wilful neglect" over the crisis. It issued a statement saying that "The warning signs have been seen for months, and the world has been slow to act. Much greater long-term investment is needed in food production and basic development to help people cope with poor rains and ensure that this is the last famine in the region."

== Humanitarian situation ==
On 20 July 2011, the UN declared a famine in the Lower Shabelle and Bakool, two regions of southern Somalia. On 3 August, famine was further declared in the Balcad and Cadale districts in Middle Shabelle as well as the IDP settlements in Mogadishu and Afgooye in response to data from the UN's food security and nutrition analysis unit. According to the UN, famine would spread to all eight regions of southern Somalia in four to six weeks due to inadequate humanitarian response caused both by ongoing access restrictions and funding gaps. The Economist also reported that widespread famine would soon occur across the entire Horn of Africa, "a situation...not seen for 25 years".

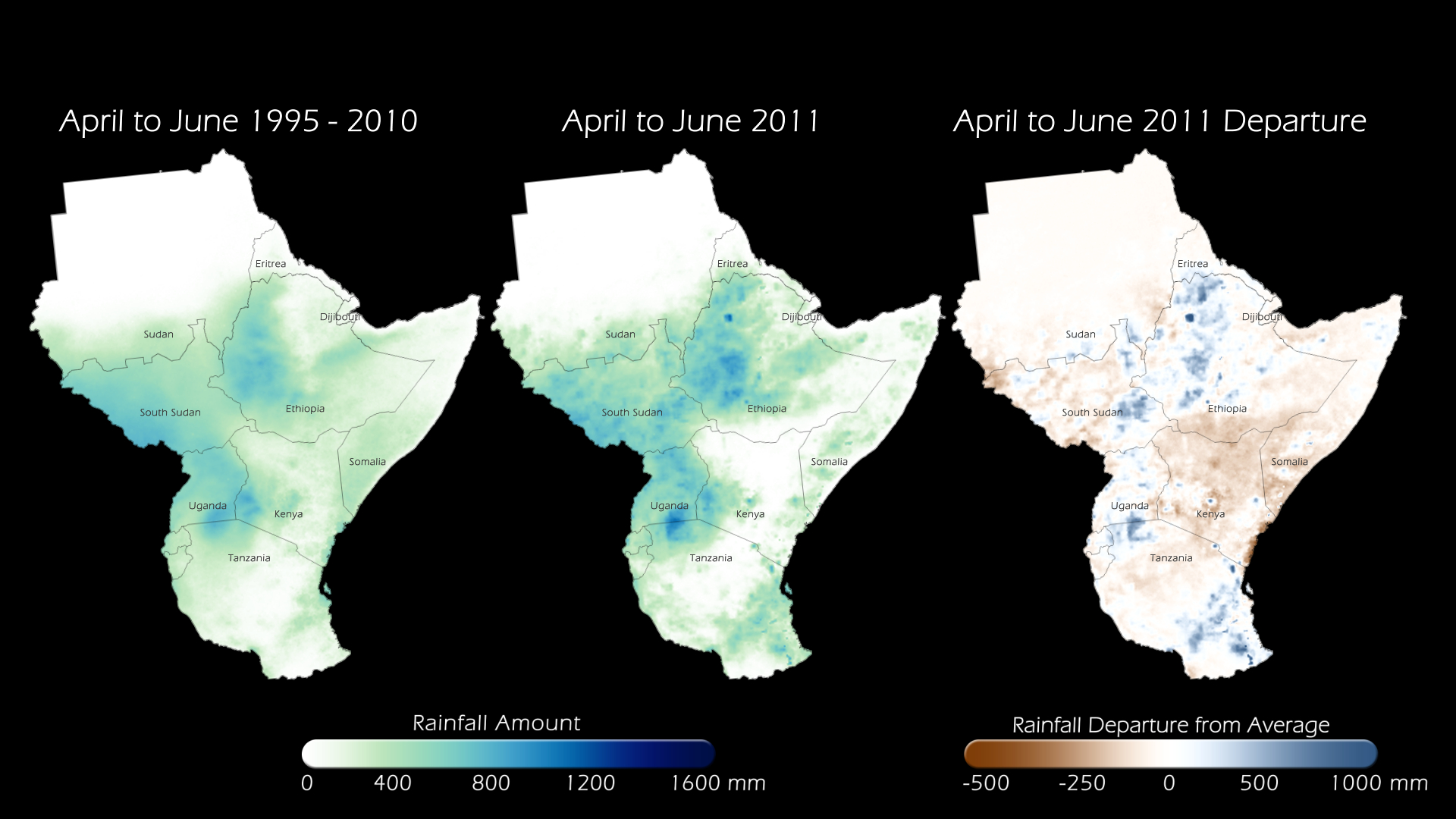
Rainfall levels in the larger East Africa region from 1995 to 2011.

According to Luca Alivoni, the head of FAO-Somalia, the food crisis in Somalia has primarily affected farmers in the south rather than the northern pastoralists since farmers often stay behind on their land plots to "protect their crops", while herders move with their livestock to pastureland.

On 20 July 2011, staple prices were at 68% over the five-year average, including increases of up to 240% in southern Somalia, 117% in south-eastern Ethiopia, and 58% in northern Kenya. In early July, the UN World Food Programme said that it expected 10 million people across the Horn of Africa region to need food aid, revising upward an earlier estimate of 6 million. Later in the month, the UN further updated the figure to 12 million, with 2.8 million in southern Somalia alone, which was the most affected area. On 3 August, the UN declared famine in three other regions of southern Somalia, citing worsening conditions and inadequate humanitarian response. Famine was expected to spread across all regions of the south in the following four to six weeks. On 5 Sep, the UN added the entire Bay region in Somalia to the list of famine-stricken areas. The UN has conducted several airlifts of supplies in addition to on-the-ground assistance, but humanitarian response to the crisis has been hindered by a severe lack of funding for international aid coupled with security issues in the region. As of September 2011, 63 percent of the UN's appeal for $2.5 billion (US) in humanitarian assistance has been financed.

The crisis was expected to worsen in the following months, peaking in August and September, with large-scale assistance needed until at least December 2011. Torrential rains also exacerbated the situation in Mogadishu by destroying makeshift homes. Tens of thousands of southern Somalia's internally displaced people were consequently left out in the cold.

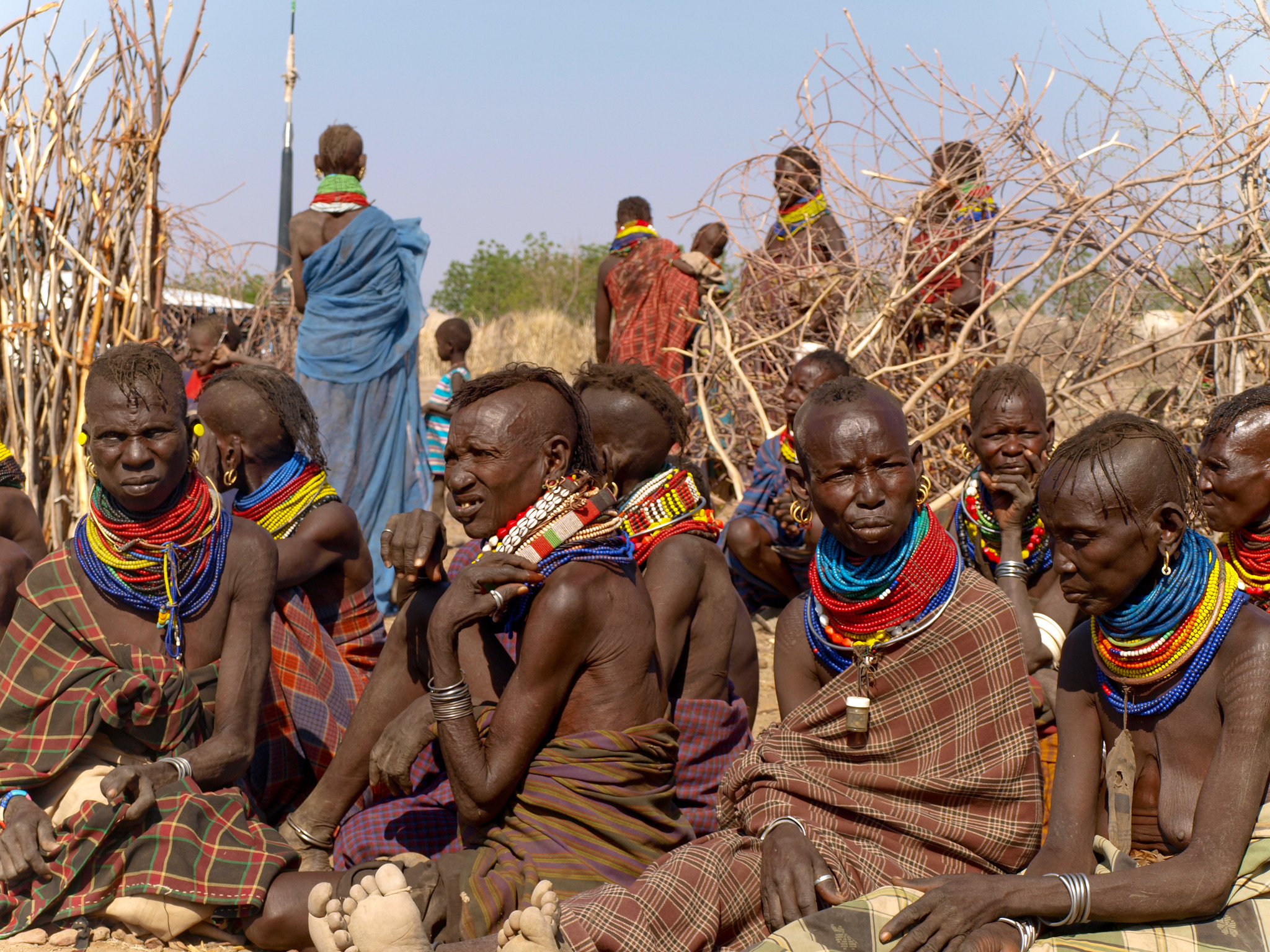
Turkana women in the Turkana District, one of Kenya's most drought-affected regions.

In addition, the Kenyan Red Cross warns of a looming humanitarian crisis in the northwestern Turkana region of Kenya, which borders South Sudan. According to officials with the aid agency, over three-fourths of the area's population is now in dire need of food supplies. Malnutrition levels are also at their highest. As a consequence, schools in the region have shut down "because there is no food for the children". About 385,000 children in these neglected parts of Kenya are already malnourished, along with 90,000 pregnant and breast feeding women. A further 3.5 million people in Kenya are estimated to be at risk of malnutrition.

In August 2012, an estimated 87,000 people in the Taita-Taveta District of Kenya were reportedly affected by famine, a situation attributed to a combination of wildlife invasions and drought. Large herds of elephants and monkeys overran farms in the district's lowland and highland areas, respectively, ruining thousands of acres of crops. Local residents, about 67,000 of whom were receiving food aid, also accused the Kenya Wildlife Service (KWS) of intentionally moving the monkeys to the district. However, this was denied by the KWS.

Food shortages have also been reported in northern and eastern Uganda. The Karamoja region and the Bulambuli district, in particular, are among the worst hit areas, with an estimated 1.2 million Ugandans affected. The Ugandan government has also indicated that as of September 2011, acute deficits in foodstuffs are expected in 35 of the country's districts.

Although fighting disrupted aid delivery in some areas, a scaling up of relief operations in mid-November had unexpectedly significantly reduced malnutrition and mortality rates in southern Somalia, prompting the UN to downgrade the humanitarian situation in the Bay, Bakool and Lower Shabele regions from famine to emergency levels. Humanitarian access to rebel-controlled areas had also improved and rainfall had surpassed expectations, improving the prospects of a good harvest in early 2012. Despite the re-imposition of blocks by the militants on the delivery of relief supplies in some areas under their control, the International Committee of the Red Cross (ICRC) reported in January 2012 that the food crisis in southern Somalia was by then no longer at emergency levels. Although security restrictions precluded the collection of updated information in December/January for a few regions in southern Somalia, the UN indicated in February 2012 that indirect data from health and relief centers pointed to improved general conditions from August 2011. The UN also announced that the famine in southern Somalia was over. However, FEWS NET indicated that Emergency (IPC Phase 4) levels of food insecurity would persist through March in the southern riverine parts of the Juba and Gedo regions, the south-central agropastoral zones of Hiran and Middle Shebele, the southeast pastoral sections of Shebele and Juba, and the north-central Coastal Deeh on account of crop flooding and ongoing military operations in these areas that have restricted humanitarian access, trade and movement.

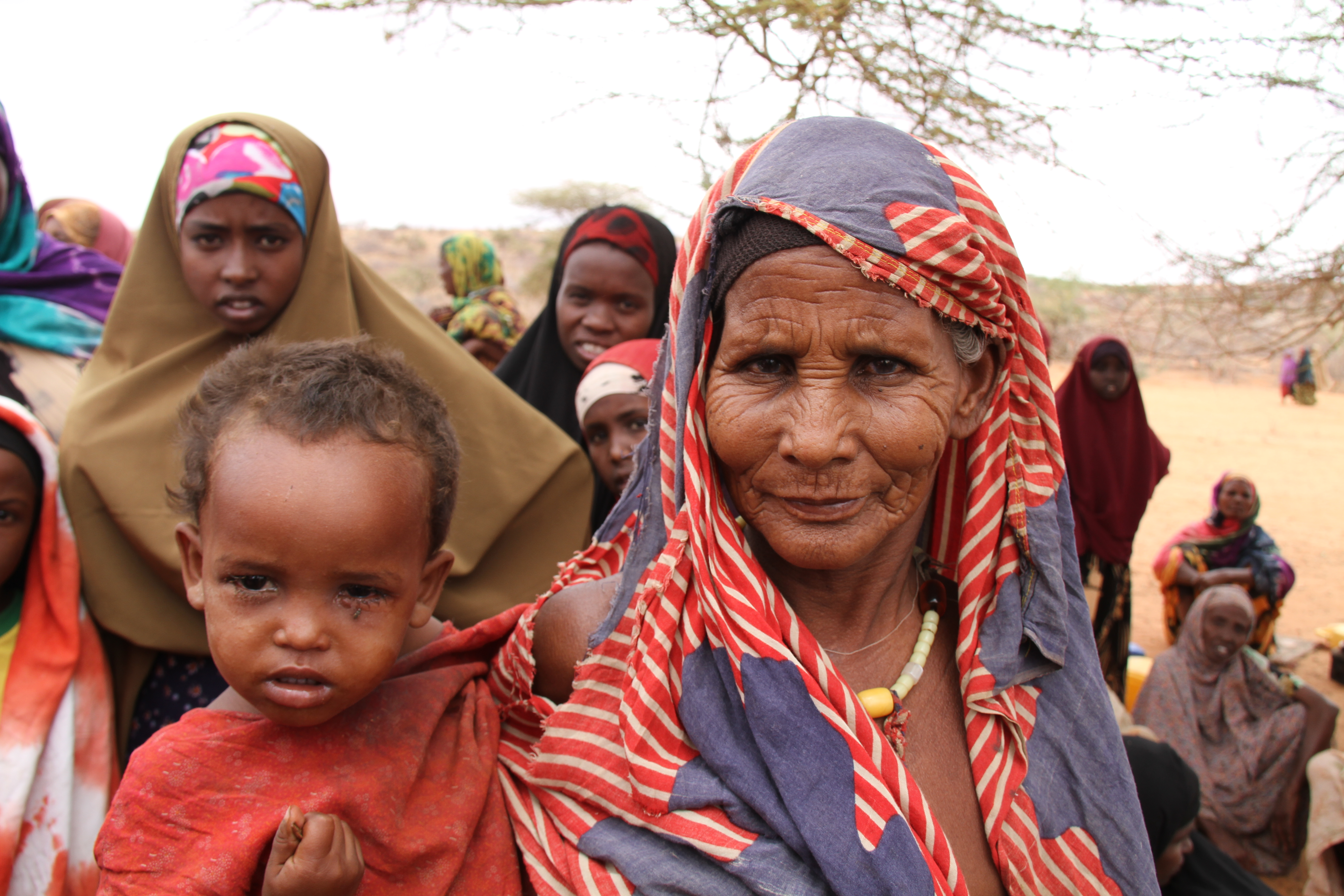
A Somali woman and child at a relief center in Dollow on the Somalia-Ethiopia border.

The UN also warned that, in a worst-case scenario of poor rains and price instability, conditions would remain at crisis level for about 31% of the population in limited-access areas until the August harvest season. In the most-likely scenario, the FSNAU and FEWS NET expect the April–June rains to be average. Ameliorated food security outcomes are also expected on account of the start of the Deyr harvest, which reached 200% of the post-war mean and is predicted to be significantly higher than usual. Except for the Juba region, where damage from flooding and limitations on trade have kept cereal prices high, the above average harvest has led to a substantial drop in overall cereal prices in the south's vulnerable regions. This has resulted in more agricultural wage labour opportunities for underprivileged agropastoral households and increased the purchasing power of pastoralists. With the exception of some coastal areas, where a little under 95,000 pastoralists have yet to recover their herd sizes from the drought and consequently still require emergency livelihood assistance (IPC Phase 4), the abundant rainfall in most parts of central and northern Somalia has replenished pastureland and also further boosted the purchasing power of local herders. With the benefit of the current harvest likely to ebb in May, the UN stressed that continued multi-sectoral response is necessary to secure the recent gains made, and that general humanitarian needs requiring international assistance would persist until at least September 2012.

According to the Sudan Crop and Food Security Assessment Mission (CSFAM) for January 2012, due to subpar cereal production and increased cereal prices caused by intense conflict that has limited trade, humanitarian and population movements, an estimated 4.2 million people in Sudan are predicted to be in the Stressed (IPC Phase 3), Crisis and Emergency levels during the first three or four months of 2012. The number was previously estimated at 3.3 million people in December 2011, and is expected to especially affect the South Kordofan, North Darfur and Blue Nile states. Below average cereal production and a trade blockade imposed by Sudan have also extended food insecurity in South Sudan, with the northern and northeastern sections of the nation expected to be at Stressed and Crisis levels through March.

Aid agencies have now shifted their emphasis to recovery efforts, including digging irrigation canals and distributing plant seeds. Long-term strategies by national governments in conjunction with development agencies are believed to offer the most sustainable results.

=== Refugee crisis ===
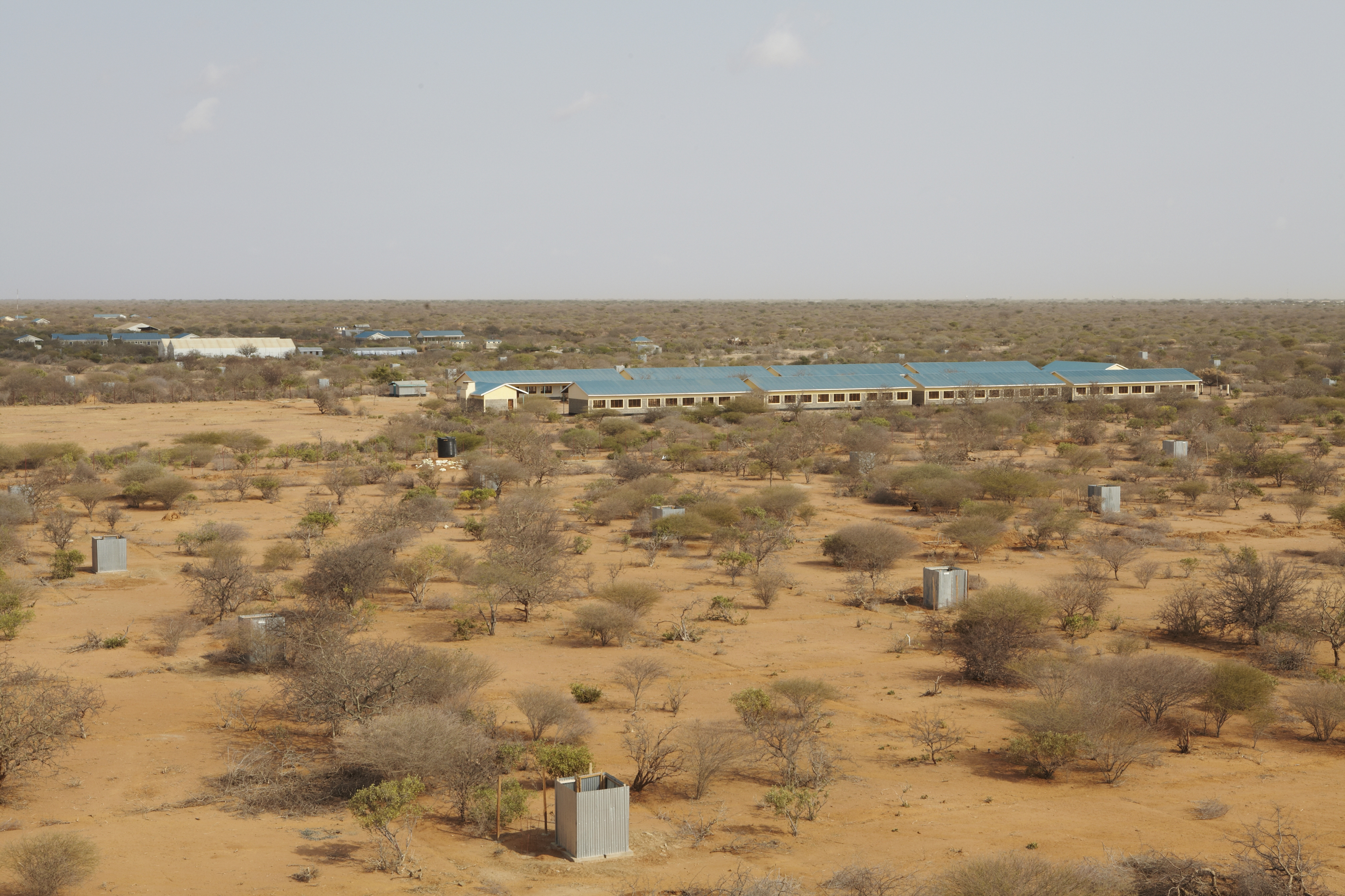
New Ifo II camp in Kenya, built to try and ease overcrowding in the Dadaab complex.

By 15 September, more than 920,000 refugees from Somalia had reportedly fled to neighboring countries, particularly Kenya and Ethiopia. At the height of the crisis in June 2011, the UNHCR base in Dadaab, Kenya hosted at least 440,000 people in three refugee camps, though the maximum capacity was 90,000. More than 1,500 refugees continued to arrive every day from southern Somalia, 80 per cent of whom were women and children. UN High Commissioner for Refugees spokeswoman Melissa Fleming said that many people had died en route. Within the camps, infant mortality had risen threefold in the few months leading up to July 2011. The overall mortality rate was 7.4 out of 10,000 per day, which was more than seven times as high as the "emergency" rate of 1 out of 10,000 per day. There was an upsurge in sexual violence against women and girls, with the number of cases reported increasing by over 4 times. Incidents of sexual violence occurred primarily during travel to the refugee camps, with some cases reported in the camps themselves or as new refugees went in search for firewood. This put them at high risk of acquiring HIV/AIDS. According to UN representative Radhika Coomaraswamy, the food crisis had forced many women to leave their homes in search of assistance, where they were often without the protection of their family and clan.

In July 2011, Dolo Odo, Ethiopia also hosted at least 110,000 refugees from Somalia, most of whom had arrived recently. The three camps at Bokolomanyo, Melkadida, and Kobe all exceeded their maximum capacity; one more camp was reportedly being built while another was planned in the future. Water shortage reportedly affected all the facilities.

According to the Lutheran World Federation, military activities in the conflict zones of southern Somalia and a scaling up of relief operations had by early December 2011 greatly reduced the movement of migrants. By February 2012, several thousand people had also begun returning to their homes and farms.

=== Health and disease ===
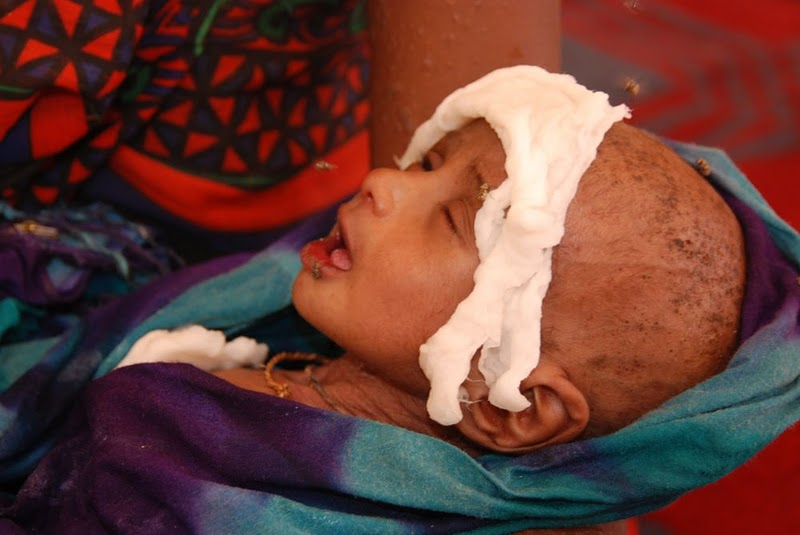
A Somali boy receiving treatment at a health facility in Hilaweyn.

In July 2011, measles cases broke out in the Dadaab camp, with 462 cases confirmed including 11 deaths. Ethiopia and Kenya were also facing a severe measles epidemic, attributed in part to the refugee crisis, with over 17,500 cases reported in the first 6 months. WHO statistics put the number of children that were then most at the risk of measles at 2 million. The epidemic in Ethiopia may have led to an measles outbreak in the United States and other parts of the developed world. The World Health Organization stated that "8.8 million people are at risk of malaria and 5 million of cholera" in Ethiopia, due to crowded, unsanitary conditions. Malnutrition rates among children in July also reached 30 percent in parts of Kenya and Ethiopia and over 50% in southern Somalia, although the latter figure dropped to 36% by mid-September according to the Food Security and Nutrition Analysis Unit. Doctors Without Borders (Médecins Sans Frontières) was also treating more than 10,000 severely malnourished children in its feeding centers and clinics. In July 2011, the UN's food security and nutrition analysis unit announced that the situation in southern Somalia then met all three characteristics of widespread famine: a) more than 30 percent of children were suffering from acute malnutrition; b) more than two adults or four children were dying of hunger each day for every group of 10,000 people; and c) the population had access to less than 2,100 kilocalories of food and four liters of water per day. In August, cholera was suspected in 181 deaths in Mogadishu, along with confirmed reports of several other outbreaks elsewhere in Somalia, thus raising fears of tragedy for a severely weakened population. In mid-November, the office of the U.N. High Commissioner for Refugees (UNHCR) also announced that 60 cholera cases, with 10 lab-confirmed and one fatality, had hit the Dadaab refugee camp in northern Kenya.

By early December 2011, the UN's OCHA bureau announced that a scaling up of relief operations had resulted in an improvement in global and severe acute malnutrition rates as well as a decrease in mortality rates in southern Somalia's conflict zones relative to the start of the drought crisis in July/August. Although acute malnutrition rates remained much higher than median global acute malnutrition (GAM) and severe acute malnutrition (SAM) rates for the October–December season, global acute malnutrition rates had fallen from 30–58 percent to 20–34 percent and severe acute malnutrition rates in turn dropped from 9–29 percent in July to 6–11 percent. The mortality rate likewise declined from 1.1–6.1 per 10,000 people per day in July/August to 0.6–2.8 per 10,000 people per day. Despite some gaps in aid delivery in certain areas due imposed Islamist bans, the Food Security and Nutrition Analysis Unit (FSNAU) also reported that its Nutrition Cluster had by December reached 357,107 of the estimated 450,000 children that had been acutely malnourished at the start of the crisis in July.

=== Security ===
In July 2011, the head of United States Agency for International Development, Rajiv Shah, stated that the drought may worsen the security situation in the region. "This is happening precisely in a part of the world that our Defense Secretary Leon Panetta just said is a critical part of our fight against terrorism and our overall international security. It just underscores the deep link between food security and national security." Armed herders are violently competing for dwindling resources. In Kenya alone more than 100 herders have been killed.

The battle flag of Al-Shabaab, an Islamist group implicated in the crisis

Fears of the Al-Shabaab insurgents, who control most of southern Somalia, continue to hinder humanitarian operations in the region. "We need significantly better access than we have at the moment to address an emergency of this scale." UN agencies are "in a dialogue" with al-Shabaab about securing airstrips in areas under the insurgent group's control to deliver aid. The United Nations World Food Programme is considering a return to southern Somalia, from which it withdrew in 2010 after threats from the rebel group Al-Shabaab. It estimates that there are 1 million people in areas it cannot currently access. In early July 2011, Al-Shabaab announced that it had withdrawn its restrictions on international humanitarian workers, and that all aid organizations will be allowed in.

However, on 22 July, the group stated that the ban on certain organizations remains in place. In a statement, Al-Shabaab's spokesman Sheikh Ali Dhere indicated that his organization had no issue with allowing "Muslims and non-Muslims to help the drought affected people", but that they will "only be permitted to work if they do not have other interests". He stated that banned agencies belong to two categories: some that are acting as spies, while others, including the UN, that have "a political agenda, doing nothing like what they were claiming". He also criticized aid agencies that are providing assistance in neighboring countries, stating that "They are luring needy people with food in order to teach them their Christianity." Hassan Liban, a director of the British charity Islamic Relief which has managed to gain access through negotiations, said that Al-Shabaab were not keen on emergency relief that was not tied to longer-term programmes to help people recover their livelihoods. He stated that "To any organisation that just wants to send food, they say: 'Give us the food and go away'. But if it's sustainable and planned they will allow you to work."

Al-Shabaab members have allegedly intimidated, kidnapped and killed some aid workers, leading to a partial suspension of humanitarian operations in southern Somalia. Ethiopia and the UN also accuse the Eritrean government of backing the insurgents. On 28 July, African Union peacekeepers launched a major offensive against Al-Shabaab militants in northern Mogadishu, Somalia, in an effort to protect famine relief efforts from attacks. Six were killed during the conflict, and key territory was seized from the insurgents. Al-Shabaab has sent 300 reinforcement fighters to Mogadishu in the preceding days, according to Lt. Col. Paddy Ankunda, spokesman for the AU peacekeeping force in Somalia. He stated that "This action will further increase security ... and ensure that aid agencies can continue to operate to get vital supplies to internally displaced." As of 1 August, the beginning of the Ramadan, the African Union offensive in ongoing. However, AU intelligence sources said that the insurgents are planning a counteroffensive during the month of fasting.

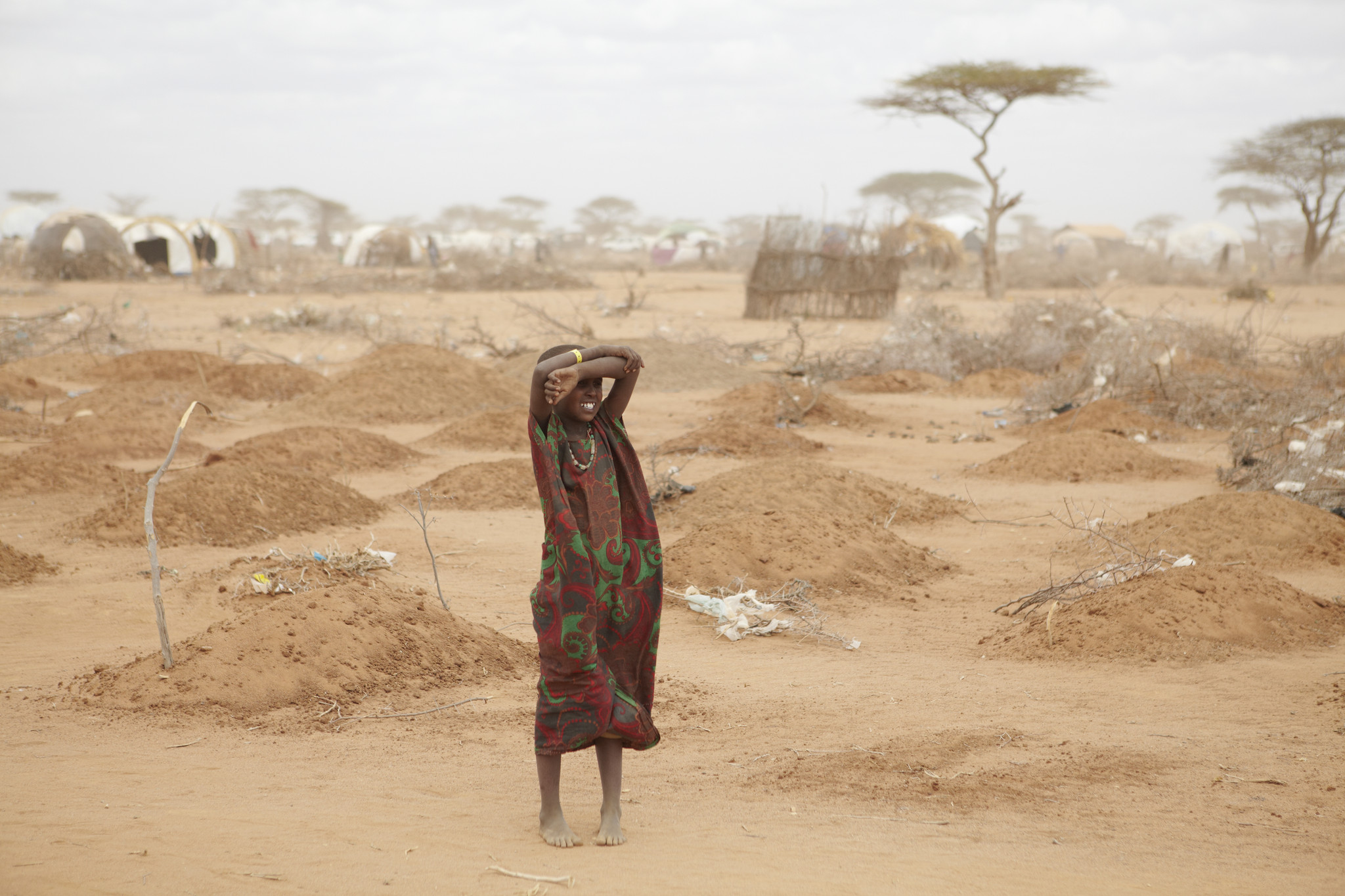
A girl stands amid the graves of 70 children on the outskirts of Dadaab. The long desert journey to the relief camps has claimed many lives.

On 6 August 2011, Reuters reported that the Transitional Federal Government's troops and their AMISOM allies managed to capture all of Mogadishu from the Al-Shabaab militants. Witnesses reported Al-Shabaab vehicles abandoning their bases in the capital for the south-central city of Baidoa. The group's spokesman Sheikh Ali Mohamud Rage described the exodus as a tactical retreat, and vowed to continue the insurgency against the national government. Observers have also suggested that the pullout may at least in part have been caused by internal ideological rifts in the rebel organization.

On 4 July 2011, the Prime Minister of Somalia Abdiweli Mohamed Ali appointed a national committee to tackle the severe drought affecting the southern part of the country. The committee consists of several federal-level members of government, including the Ministers of Defense, Health, Interior, Finance, Public Works, Women's Affairs and Information. It is tasked with assessing and addressing the needs of the drought-impacted segments of the population.

On 13 August, Prime Minister Ali also announced the creation of a new 300-man security force in response to discussions with UN officials about the situation in Mogadishu. The UN stated earlier in the week that aid was only reaching around 20% of the drought-affected peoples, with most of the famine-stricken areas still controlled by Al-Shabaab rebels. Assisted by African peacekeepers, the new military unit will have as its primary goal to protect convoys and food aid, as well as to secure the IDP camps themselves when the relief supplies are being distributed. Besides helping to stabilize the city, the new protection force is also tasked with combating looting and banditry in addition to other vices.

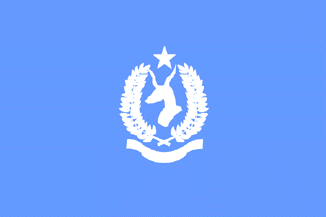
The Somali National Army (SNA) and Somali Police Force (SPF) have ramped up security operations in the wake of the drought.

On 16 August, Neela Ghoshal, an official with Human Rights Watch, told Reuters that her group had received complaints of government soldiers robbing civilians. However, Voice of America reported earlier in the month that, according to witnesses at a camp in Mogadishu, men dressed as government troops began stealing food rations, after which point government soldiers that were guarding the supplies opened fire on the looters. In response to the incident, the Somali government forces Commander General Abdikarim Dhengobadan denied that his men were responsible for the looting. The Information Minister of Somalia Abdirahman Omar Osman and the AMISOM commander Paddy Akunda have also previously accused Al-Shabaab militants of disguising themselves as Somali government soldiers before attacking government and AMISOM positions. Despite this, according to the UN, the security situation in the capital has generally improved since the withdrawal of Al-Shabaab militants, thus facilitating the scaling up of relief efforts in the region.

On 13 October 2011, two women from Spain employed as aid workers with Doctors Without Borders at the Dadaab refugee camp were kidnapped by gunmen. The U.N. temporarily suspended all non-lifesaving aid operations at Dadaab. The Spanish branch of Medecins Sans Frontieres (Doctors Without Borders) announced that all 49 expatriate staff working for the charity would be evacuated to Nairobi, leaving 343 local staff members in Dadaab. Certain activities such as registering new arrivals and journeying outside camp to meet refugees walking the final miles would be suspended. In December 2011, three Somali aid workers were also shot and killed in the central Somali town of Mataban. Two of the workers were UN World Food Programme employees and the third worked for a partner organization. The gunman turned himself in to the local authorities.

In October 2011 a coordinated operation, Operation Linda Nchi, between the Somali military and the Kenyan military, began against the Al-Shabaab militants, who are alleged to have kidnapped several foreign aid workers and tourists inside Kenya. According to the Ethiopian Foreign Minister, the mission represents one of the final stages of the Islamist insurgency.

== International response ==
Funding Status Horn of Africa Crisis (as of 24 September 2011)
	Requirements (million US$)	Committed (million US$)	% met
Kenya	741	480	65%
Djibouti	33	19	56%
Somalia	983	732	74%
Ethiopia (non-refugees)	398	291	73%
Ethiopia (refugees)	246	112	45%
Miscellaneous funding		76
Total	2402	1710	71%
Source: UN Office for the Coordination of Humanitarian Affairs (OCHA)

Humanitarian agencies have requested US$2.48 billion to address the crisis, but as of 1 August have secured less than half that amount. The European Union announced it would provide €5.67 million to help millions of people in the Horn of Africa affected by the drought. On 16 July, the UK government pledged £52.25 million, on top of £38 million pledged earlier that month and more than £13 million raised by the Disasters Emergency Committee. As of 25 August, the amount raised by the Disasters Emergency Committee had increased to £57 million. Australia announced at the end of July that it would supply an additional $20 million, thereby increasing the total aid volume to $80 million. As of 5 October, the Canadian government and people also contributed about $142 million CAD to the relief efforts in Eastern Africa, with the Canadian authorities pledging an additional $70 million CAD in matching funds. Much of the fundraising done from Canadians was contributed to the Humanitarian Coalition who distributed to its 5 partners. Over C$14 Million dollars was raised by the Coalition.

In late August 2011, Saudi Arabia announced that it would donate $60 million in aid to the drought-impacted peoples in Somalia and urged the Al-Shabaab militants to cease their hostilities so as to facilitate the delivery of relief materials. Iran dispatched multiple convoys of humanitarian supplies and $25 million to the famine-stricken parts of the country, with Lebanon sending its first consignment to Mogadishu over the same period. Despite experiencing financial difficulties, Palestinians in the Gaza Strip also assisted in the relief efforts. Imams in mosques raised awareness about the drought crisis and its parallels with the Palestinian situation, and urged Palestinians to contribute; the Arab Doctors Union Gaza branch also launched a fund-raising initiative, with most donations coming from affluent entrepreneurs and local NGOs. Additionally, Bahrain donated $3 million to the campaign, with Algeria, Egypt, Jordan, Kuwait, Qatar, Sudan, and the United Arab Emirates also sending supplies.

Elsewhere, Turkey dispatched multiple aid convoys to Somalia, working closely with the Somali Red Crescent Society to deliver the materials to the drought-stricken parts of the country. China also donated $16 million to the relief efforts, with Venezuela sending $5 million, Russia contributing $3 million, and Kazakhstan adding $500,000. In addition, Azerbaijan and Indonesia have assisted in the humanitarian campaign, with Malaysia dispatching aid workers on site.

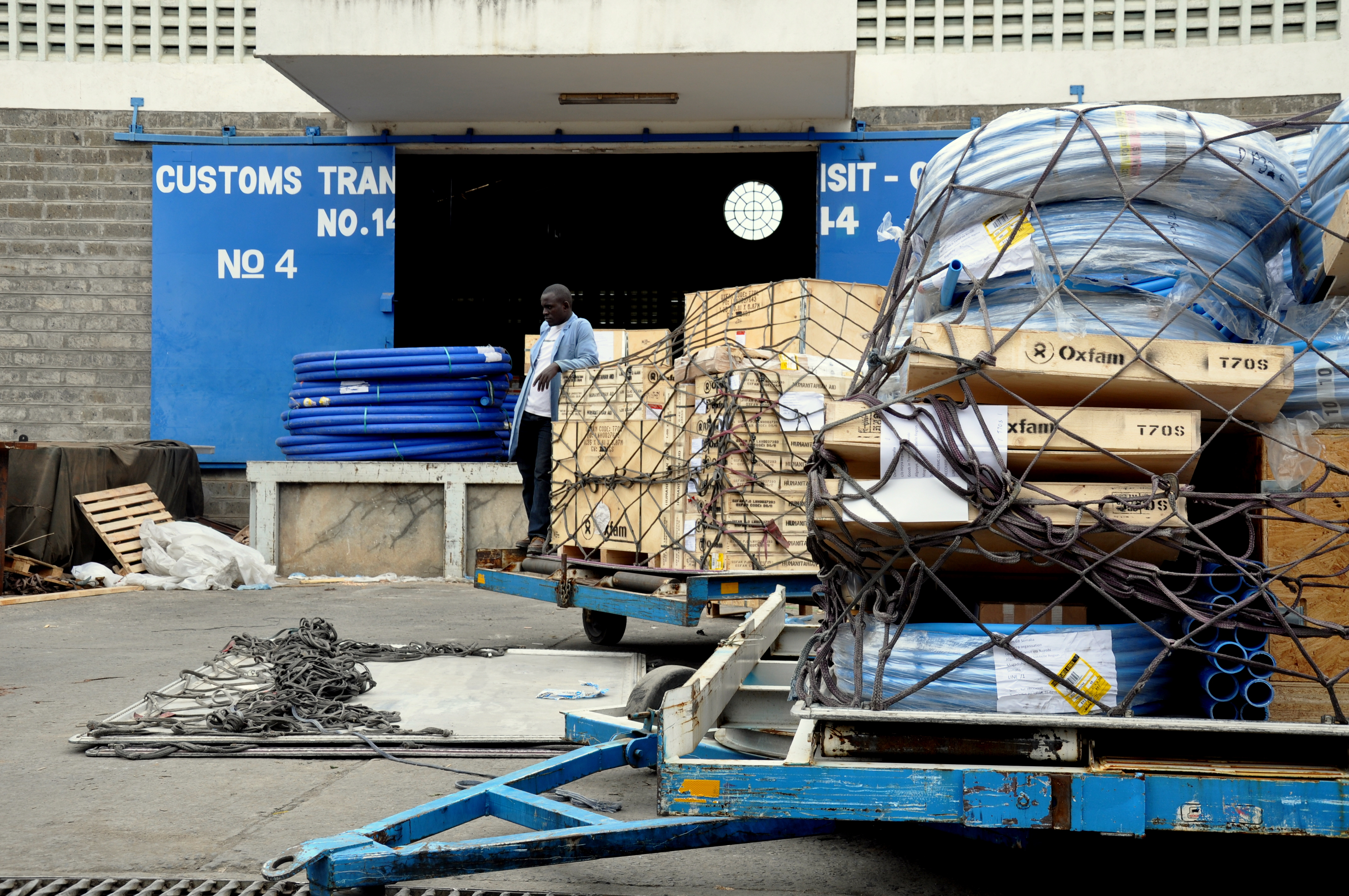
Relief supplies at an Oxfam warehouse in Kenya

The U.S. has pledged an additional $5 million to help refugees from Somalia on top of a previously budgeted $63 million for general support in the larger East Africa region. However, the U.S. has withheld aid from the Somalia region, due to recent regulations which prevent the sending of food aid that risks "materially benefiting" designated terrorists, in this case the rebel group Al-Shabaab. The regulations came into force after reports that Al-Shabaab was "taxing food convoys", and as a result U.S. aid spending in Somalia has dropped from $150 million to $13 million this year. Mercy Corps has stated that "The aid effort will remain totally inadequate if legal restrictions force the US to remain on the sidelines". In addition, under U.S. regulations, international organizations may face prosecution under US law if their humanitarian aid materially benefits Al-Shabaab. However, on 2 August, the United States announced that it would no longer prosecute humanitarian organizations who attempt to enter rebel-controlled territory.

On 12 July, United Nations Secretary-General Ban Ki-moon called an urgent emergency meeting with the heads of UN agencies. He stated after the meeting that immediate action must be taken to prevent the crisis from deepening. According to Ban, "The human cost of this crisis is catastrophic. We cannot afford to wait." On 13 July, the United Nations High Commissioner for Refugees began a "massive" airlift of aid supplies to the Dadaab region in Kenya, including 100 tonnes of tents to help relieve the congestion at the overcrowded Dadaab camps. The United Nations carried out its first airlift of emergency supplies in two years to southern Somalia on Wednesday, 13 July. Health kits are also being sent through land routes. Among other measures being taken by aid agencies are the distribution of cash vouchers to residents, and discussions with traders to freeze rapidly increasing food prices.

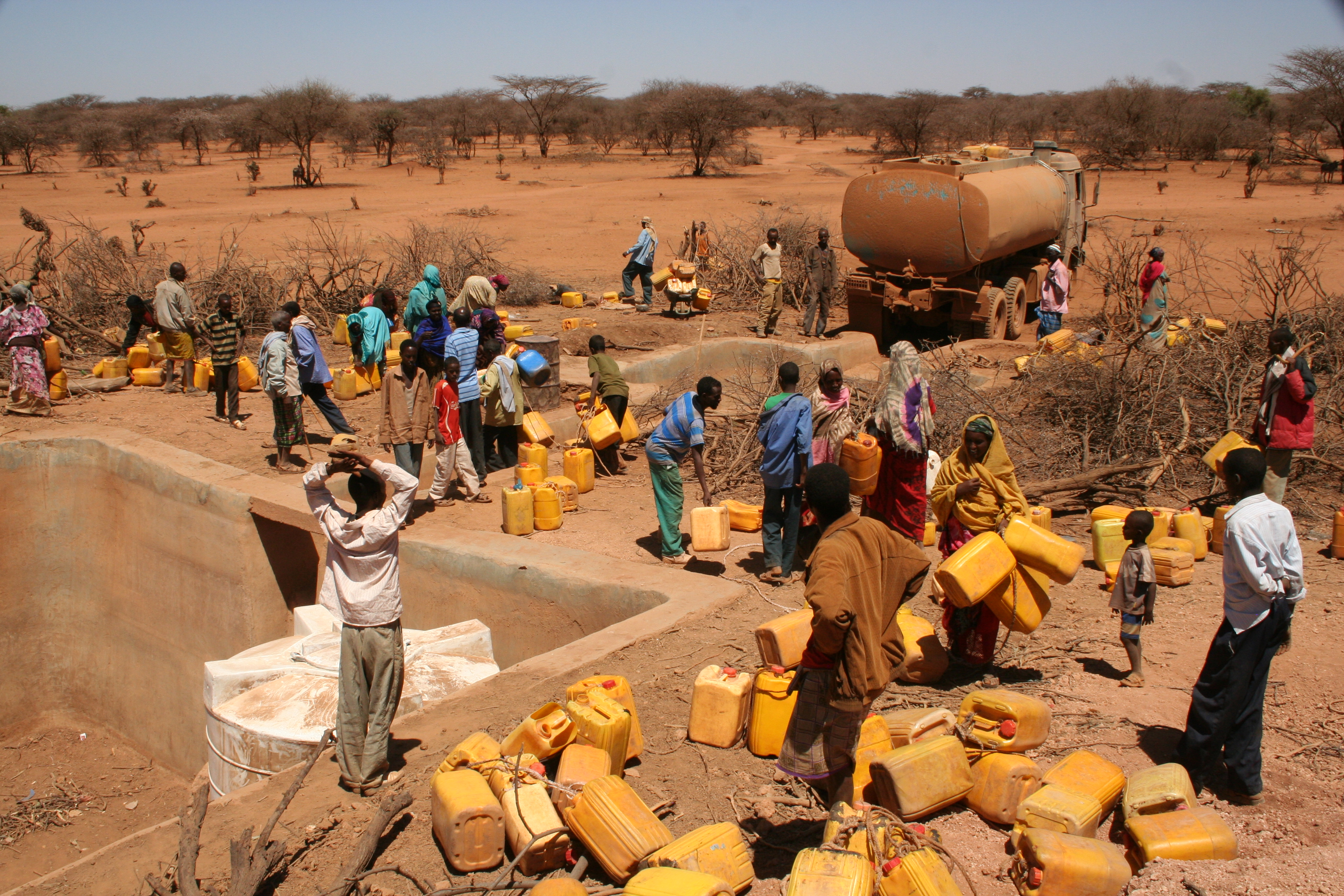
Oxfam distributing clean water to a drought-stricken area in southern Ethiopia

The UN's declaration of famine has been its first since the 1984–1985 famine in Ethiopia, when over a million people died. Under international law, there is no mandated response which must follow from an official declaration of famine. However, it is hoped that the use of the term will serve as a "wake-up call" to the rest of the world, who have so far failed to respond. The UN humanitarian coordinator for Somalia, Mark Bowden, stated that UN agencies lack the necessary capacity to save the lives of hundreds of thousands of drought-affected people from Somalia, and that nearly $300 million in relief supplies are required over the next two months.

On 27 July, the UN World Food Programme announced that it had begun an airlift of food to Somalia. Ten tonnes of food were delivered to Mogadishu, with plans to expand delivery to southern Somalia where millions remain inaccessible, and may be too weak to cross the border into neighbouring Kenya. Delivery of food to the region remained complicated by the refusal of al-Shabaab militants to allow certain foreign aid agencies to work in the country.

On 25 Aug, a much delayed African Union summit raised $51 million of direct aid, some of which were perhaps announced before, along with an additional $300 million from the African Development Bank to be spent over a four-year period. The African Union is, however, a young organization with little humanitarian experience.

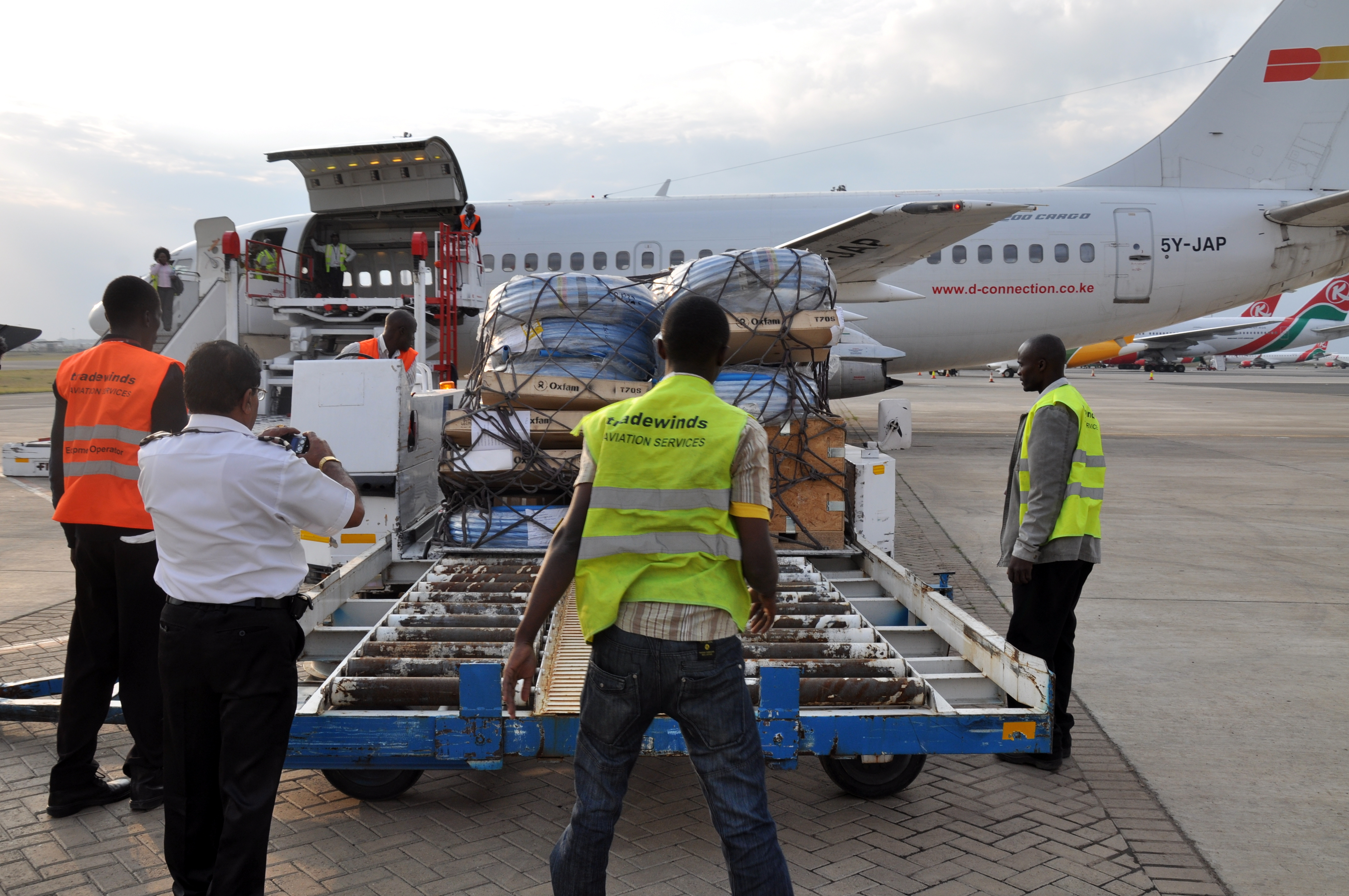
Oxfam staff preparing to fly in relief supplies

On 30 Aug, the UN refugee agency announced that the furniture corporation IKEA would be making a $62 million donation (42.8 million euros) over three years to expand the overcrowded Dadaab refugee complex in Kenya. The company CEO was quoted as saying that this donation will "immediately make a difference" in thousands of lives. In September 2011, during the UN General Assembly in NYC, USAID and the Ad Council launched the agency's first ever Public Service Awareness Campaign called FWD, an acronym for Famine, War and Drought. The Campaign encourages the public to "Forward the Facts" about the campaign to help raise awareness. In early Oct. 2011, the ONE Campaign unveiled a public service message in which celebrities appear to be cursing and then the message says that famine is the real obscenity.

Fifty-six African artists and celebrities, including Nameless, Angélique Kidjo, 2face Idibia, Hugh Masekela, Freshlyground and K'naan, as well as international campaigners, sent a letter to a special UN session on the horn of Africa crisis scheduled for Saturday 8 Oct.

In Sept. 2011, Rajiv Shah, head of U.S. Agency for International Development (USAID), stated "We're trying cash distributions through the hawala system and through mobile phones and then concomitantly flooding border markets with food so that traders can then make the connections." Somalis in the diaspora have likewise routinely sent money to drought-affected relatives at home through the informal money transfer system. Part of this funding stream experienced a potential setback in December 2011, when Sunrise Community Banks, a U.S. financial institution that wires the transfers for many of the hawalas, announced that it might discontinue the service on 30 December due to overly strict government security regulations. Somali and American federal officials as well as representatives of the transfer companies have worked together closely to resolve the issue, with the CEO of the Sunrise Community Banks indicating that "from a risk perspective, we are making progress, and I am optimistic that we are on the right path to get to a solution". Kenyan expatriates have similarly availed themselves of mobile phone services to send funds to their own drought-impacted family members in Kenya.

In early 2012, the Turkish government ramped up its existing humanitarian and developmental efforts in southern Somalia. In coordination with the Somali authorities, it mobilized Turkish governmental organizations and NGOs to build new hospitals, a new relief center, and a tent city for remaining IDPs, which was scheduled to be converted into apartment flats. These and other proactive efforts have reportedly helped set in motion a rapid local recovery.

== United States Sanctions ==
Under the US Patriot Act it is illegal for American organizations to provide aid to "anyone associated with a terrorist group". The Federal Agency responsible for enforcement of these sanctions is Office of Foreign Assets Control (OFAC). In February 2008, Al-Shabab had been added to the U.S. government's list of terrorist organizations. All deliveries of U.S. Food Aid were suspended in 2009 "because of concerns over OFAC rules" due to the possibility that some of the food aid could benefit al-Shabab.

Despite the approaching famine, no food aid was prepared for Somalia in fall 2011. Scholars have written:

Aid organizations faced strict regulations of food distribution by donors in an effort to deprive Al-Shabab of food for its own forces"...OFAC imposed sanctions in Somalia to ensure that no material support, including food aid, would go to Al-Shabab in support of its rebel activities. Accountability requirements for food were so stringent that record keeping was not possible outside of the capital, Mogadishu.

OFAC's rules were eventually relaxed, but the delay cost lives.

== See also ==
- 1983–1985 famine in Ethiopia
- 2017 Somali drought
- ActionAid
- Desertification
- Environmental issues in Africa
- La Niña
- Horn of Africa drought (2020–present)
